= List of Gibraltar international footballers =

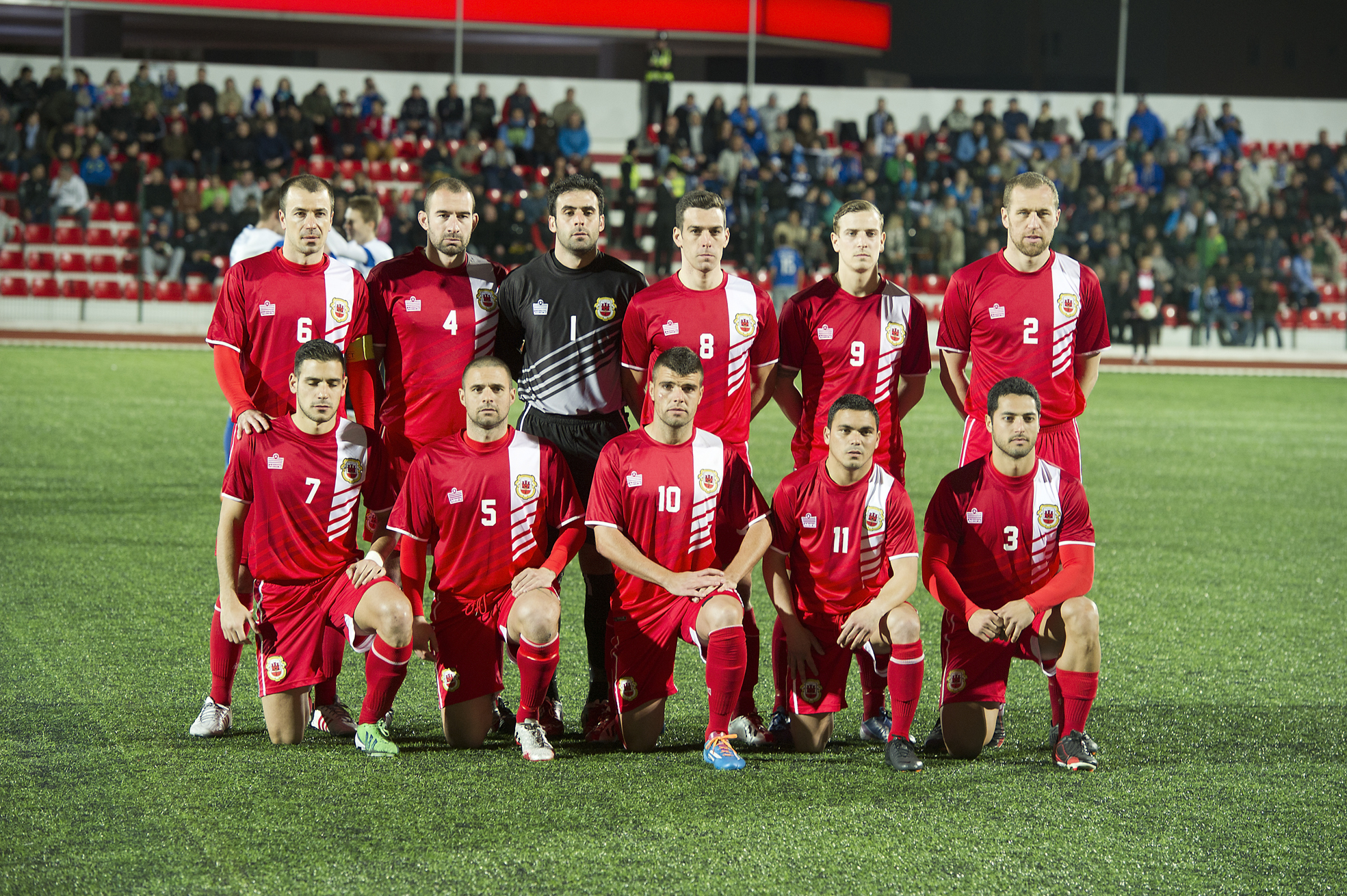
The Gibraltar national football team at the Victoria Stadium before a match against Estonia.

The Gibraltar national football team is the representative association football team of Gibraltar, a British Overseas Territory located at the southern tip of the Iberian Peninsula. It is controlled by the Gibraltar Football Association (GFA), the governing body of the sport there. It competes as a member of the Union of European Football Associations (UEFA) and the International Federation of Association Football (FIFA). They first applied for UEFA membership in 1997 which was rejected, as UEFA would only allow membership for applicants recognised as sovereign states by the United Nations. In October 2012, Gibraltar reapplied for membership and it was granted in March 2013. Gibraltar played their first official international fixture on 13 November 2013, a 0–0 draw with Slovakia in the Estádio Algarve, Portugal.

As of the match played on 9 June 2025, Gibraltar have competed in 98 matches, winning 10, drawing 14 and losing 74. They have played more matches against Liechtenstein more than any other international side, with eight meetings between them. In global and continental competitions, the team has competed in qualification groups for both the FIFA World Cup since 2018, and the UEFA European Championship since 2016; but have failed to qualify for any tournament finals. They have competed in the UEFA Nations League since the inaugural season in 2018–19.

Midfielder Liam Walker is the nation's most capped player, accumulating 88 appearances since his international debut in November 2013 against Slovakia. Walker is also the nation's leading goalscorer of all time with eight goals. Dayle Coleing is the most capped goalkeeper in Gibraltar's history having appeared 32 times for the national side. Forward Tjay De Barr has received the most yellow cards (cautions), with thirteen. Defender Jayce Olivero has received the most red cards (dismissals), with two sending offs. Since their official debut in 2013, 82 players have made at least one international appearance for Gibraltar.

== Players ==
Appearances and goals are composed of UEFA Nations League, UEFA European Championship qualification, FIFA World Cup qualification, and international friendly matches. Players are listed by number of caps. If number of caps are equal, the players are then listed alphabetically. Statistics correct as of match played on the 9 June 2025.

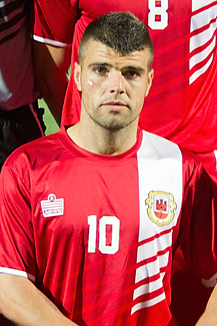
Liam Walker, current captain, is the most capped player for Gibraltar with 88 appearances, and top scorer with eight goals.

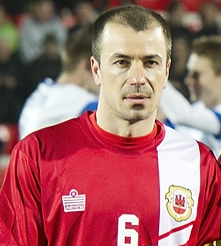
Roy Chipolina scored Gibraltar's first goal as members of UEFA in a friendly against the Faroe Islands on 1 March 2014.

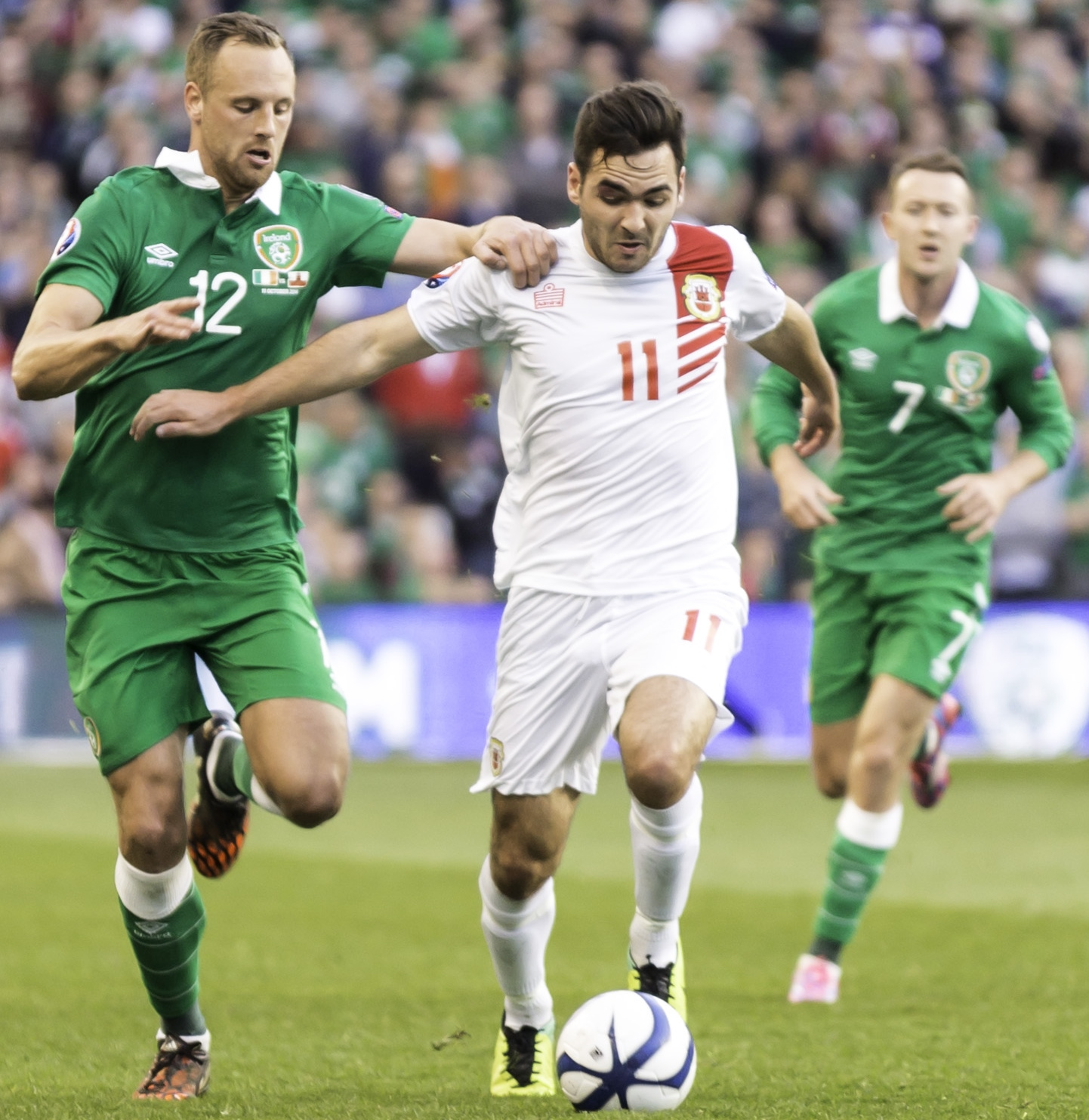
Jake Gosling was the first player to score more than one goal for the national team.

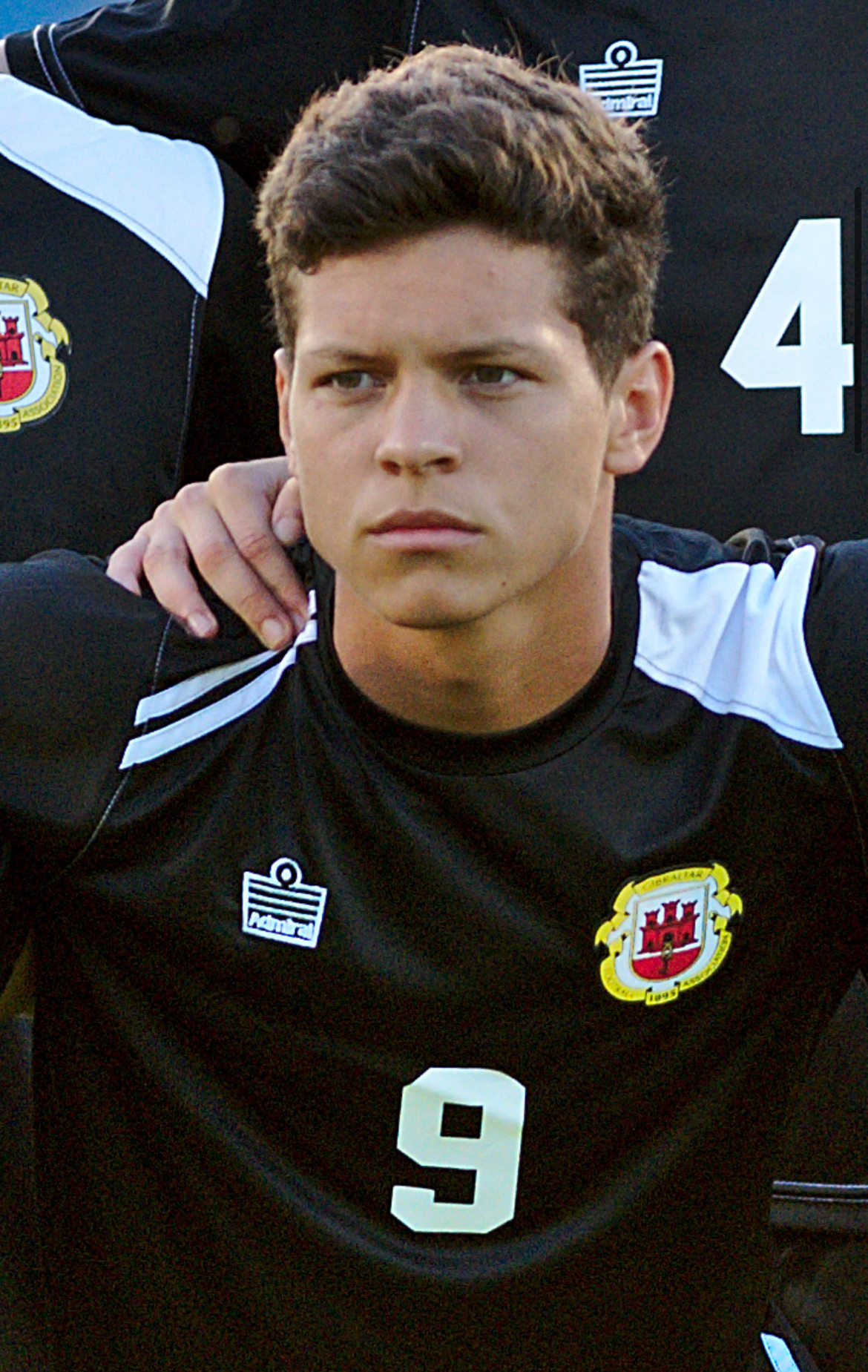
Tjay De Barr has received the most yellow cards (cautions) for Gibraltar with 13.

Gibraltar national team football players
#	Name	Position	Caps	Goals	Discipline		First match	Last match
#	Name	Position	Caps	Goals	Booked	Sent off	First match	Last match
1	Liam Walker	Midfielder	88	8	8	1	19 November 2013	9 June 2025
2	Roy Chipolina	Defender	75	5	4	0	19 November 2013	21 March 2024
3	Lee Casciaro	Forward	66	3	11	0	7 September 2014	13 October 2024
4	Jayce Olivero	Defender	63	0	9	2	23 March 2016	15 November 2024
5	Joseph Chipolina	Defender	61	2	11	1	19 November 2013	4 September 2024
5	Jack Sergeant	Defender	61	0	10	0	19 November 2013	3 June 2024
7	Louie Annesley	Defender	52	1	12	0	25 March 2018	9 June 2025
7	Tjay De Barr	Forward	52	3	13	0	25 March 2018	9 June 2025
9	Ethan Britto	Defender	46	1	7	0	13 October 2018	9 June 2025
10	Kian Ronan	Midfielder	41	0	3	0	5 September 2020	9 June 2025
11	Scott Wiseman	Defender	38	0	1	0	19 November 2013	19 June 2023
12	Aymen Mouelhi	Defender	37	0	4	0	16 November 2018	15 November 2024
13	Ethan Jolley	Defender	35	0	3	0	26 March 2019	15 November 2024
14	Graeme Torrilla	Midfielder	33	1	10	0	5 September 2020	9 June 2025
15	Dayle Coleing	Goalkeeper	32	0	1	1	5 September 2019	21 March 2024
15	Jamie Coombes	Forward	32	0	0	0	7 June 2015	21 November 2023
17	Reece Styche	Forward	31	3	4	0	1 March 2014	27 March 2023
18	Anthony Bardon	Midfielder	29	0	2	0	26 May 2014	10 June 2019
18	Bernardo Lopes	Defender	29	0	1	0	23 March 2022	9 June 2025
20	Anthony Hernandez	Midfielder	28	1	1	0	1 March 2014	2 June 2022
21	Julian Valarino	Midfielder	27	0	1	0	24 March 2021	9 June 2025
22	Erin Barnett	Defender	26	0	4	1	4 September 2015	13 November 2021
22	Kyle Casciaro	Forward	26	1	4	0	19 November 2013	14 November 2020
22	Jean-Carlos Garcia	Defender	26	0	1	0	26 May 2014	6 September 2018
22	Alain Pons	Midfielder	26	0	0	0	31 August 2017	7 September 2021
26	Ryan Casciaro	Defender	24	0	2	0	19 November 2013	25 March 2018
27	Kyle Goldwin	Goalkeeper	21	0	4	0	25 March 2018	8 October 2021
28	Adam Priestley	Forward	18	1	1	0	19 November 2013	14 November 2020
29	Bradley Banda	Goalkeeper	17	0	0	0	11 October 2021	9 June 2025
29	Jordan Perez	Goalkeeper	17	0	0	0	19 November 2013	7 October 2016
29	Nicholas Pozo	Midfielder	17	0	2	0	5 June 2022	25 March 2025
32	Mohamed Badr Hassan	Midfielder	16	0	2	0	10 October 2019	21 November 2023
33	James Scanlon	Midfielder	14	2	0	0	21 March 2024	9 June 2025
34	Robert Guiling	Midfielder	13	0	1	0	19 November 2013	10 October 2017
35	Jamie Bosio	Defender	12	0	2	0	7 June 2015	25 March 2018
35	Ayoub El Hmidi	Midfielder	12	0	0	0	16 June 2023	9 June 2025
35	Jake Gosling	Midfielder	12	2	1	0	26 May 2014	25 March 2018
35	Aaron Payas	Midfielder	12	0	0	0	1 March 2014	25 March 2017
39	Jaiden Bartolo	Forward	11	0	1	0	26 March 2024	9 June 2025
39	John-Paul Duarte	Forward	11	0	0	0	1 March 2014	3 September 2017
39	Andrew Hernandez	Midfielder	11	0	1	0	13 October 2018	27 March 2021
42	Evan De Haro	Midfielder	10	0	2	0	11 October 2023	19 November 2024
43	Dan Bent	Forward	9	2	4	1	4 September 2024	9 June 2025
43	Ethan Santos	Defender	9	0	0	1	27 March 2021	19 November 2024
43	Michael Yome	Forward	9	0	0	0	4 September 2015	10 October 2017
46	Jay Bosio	Defender	8	0	3	0	24 March 2021	11 October 2021
46	George Cabrera	Forward	8	1	1	0	26 May 2014	16 October 2018
46	Deren Ibrahim	Goalkeeper	8	0	0	0	10 October 2016	10 October 2017
46	Jeremy Lopez	Midfielder	8	0	0	0	19 November 2013	10 October 2017
46	Jamie Robba	Goalkeeper	8	0	0	0	4 June 2014	1 September 2016
51	David Artell	Defender	7	0	1	0	1 March 2014	29 March 2015
51	Niels Hartman	Defender	7	0	1	0	27 March 2023	26 March 2024
53	Brian Perez	Midfielder	6	0	0	0	7 September 2014	11 October 2015
54	Daniel Duarte	Midfielder	5	0	0	0	19 November 2013	11 October 2015
54	Yogan Santos	Defender	5	0	0	0	1 March 2014	14 November 2014
56	Liam Jessop	Forward	4	0	0	0	22 March 2025	9 June 2025
56	Jason Pusey	Defender	4	0	0	0	25 March 2017	7 October 2017
56	Carlos Richards	Midfielder	4	0	0	0	22 March 2025	9 June 2025
59	Kenneth Chipolina	Defender	3	0	0	0	25 March 2017	7 June 2021
59	Sykes Garro	Forward	3	0	0	0	13 November 2016	9 September 2018
59	Danny Higginbotham	Defender	3	0	0	0	19 November 2013	5 March 2014
59	Kai Mauro	Defender	3	0	0	0	25 March 2025	9 June 2025
59	Kelvin Morgan	Forward	3	0	1	0	4 June 2021	19 November 2022
64	Rafael Bado	Midfielder	2	0	0	0	7 September 2014	11 October 2014
64	Matt Cafer	Goalkeeper	2	0	0	0	19 November 2018	10 October 2019
64	Jaylan Hankins	Goalkeeper	2	0	1	0	3 June 2024	6 June 2024
64	Paddy McClafferty	Defender	2	0	0	0	22 March 2025	25 March 2025
64	Robert Montovio	Forward	2	0	0	0	23 March 2016	29 March 2016
64	Antony Moulds	Defender	2	0	0	0	27 March 2021	30 March 2021
70	Julio Bado	Midfielder	1	0	0	0	19 November 2013	19 November 2013
70	Scott Ballantine	Midfielder	1	0	0	0	19 June 2023	19 June 2023
70	Dylan Borge	Forward	1	0	0	0	27 March 2021	27 March 2021
70	Tayler Carrington	Defender	1	0	0	0	6 June 2025	6 June 2025
70	Mitchell Gibson	Midfielder	1	0	0	0	6 June 2025	6 June 2025
70	Evan Green	Forward	1	0	0	0	3 September 2017	3 September 2017
70	Al Greene	Forward	1	0	0	0	19 November 2013	19 November 2013
70	Kye Livingstone	Midfielder	1	0	0	0	25 March 2025	25 March 2025
70	Dylan Peacock	Midfielder	1	0	0	0	21 November 2023	21 November 2023
70	Matt Reoch	Forward	1	0	0	0	5 March 2014	5 March 2014
70	Justin Rovegno	Defender	1	0	0	0	7 June 2015	7 June 2015
70	Michael Ruiz	Forward	1	0	1	0	21 March 2024	21 March 2024
70	Tyson Ruiz	Midfielder	1	0	0	0	10 October 2017	10 October 2017

== See also ==
- Gibraltar national football team records and statistics
