= Jeremy Perera =

Gibraltarian footballer

Personal information
- Full name: Jeremy Christopher Perera
- Date of birth: 14 January 2006 (age 20)
- Place of birth: Gibraltar
- Position: Defensive midfielder

Team information
- Current team: Silsden

Youth career
- –2018: Atlético Zabal
- 2018–2023: San Roque

Senior career*
Years	Team	Apps	(Gls)
2023–2025	Mons Calpe	21	(1)
2024–2025	→ Whitley Bay (loan)	0	(0)
2025	Heaton Stannington	1	(0)
2025	→ Seaham Red Star (dual-reg)	0	(0)
2025	FC Magpies	2	(0)
2025–2026	Blyth Spartans	5	(1)
2026	Ashington	8	(0)
2026–	Silsden	5	(0)

International career^{‡}
2022	Gibraltar U16	2	(1)
2022	Gibraltar U17	4	(0)
2023	Gibraltar U19	2	(0)
2024–	Gibraltar U21	5	(0)
2025–	Gibraltar	5	(0)
- * Club domestic league appearances and goals as of 21 November 2026 ‡ National team caps and goals as of 26 March 2026

Jeremy Christopher Perera (born 14 January 2006) is a Gibraltarian footballer who plays as a defensive midfielder for Silsden and the Gibraltar national football team.

== Club career ==
After spending his youth in Spain primarily with San Roque, Perera returned to Gibraltar in 2023 to join Mons Calpe. He spent 2 years with the Calpeans before moving to England to study, including a stint with Heaton Stannington, with whom he played once. In summer 2025 he joined FC Magpies, making his debut in the UEFA Conference League on 10 July 2025.

On 16 October 2025, it was announced that Perera had signed for Northern Premier League Division One side Blyth Spartans, joining up with compatriots Paddy McClafferty and Jesse Gomez. After falling out of favour with new manager Marc Nash, Perera left the Spartans in January 2026 and joined league rivals Ashington on 30 January 2026.

== International career ==
Perera made his senior international debut on 4 September 2025, in a friendly against Albania.
