= Jesse Gomez =

Gibraltarian footballer

Personal information
- Full name: Jesse Christopher Gómez
- Date of birth: 11 October 2005 (age 21)
- Place of birth: Gibraltar
- Position: Midfielder

Team information
- Current team: Consett

Youth career
- –2024: Algeciras

Senior career*
Years	Team	Apps	(Gls)
2023–2024	Algeciras B	2	(0)
2024–2025	Whitley Bay	0	(0)
2025–2026	Blyth Spartans	17	(1)
2026–	Consett	14	(2)

International career^{‡}
2021	Gibraltar U17	4	(0)
2022–2023	Gibraltar U19	3	(0)
2025–	Gibraltar U21	8	(0)
2025–	Gibraltar	7	(0)
- * Club domestic league appearances and goals as of 7 November 2026 ‡ National team caps and goals as of 18 November 2026

Jesse Christopher Gomez (born 11 October 2005) is a Gibraltarian footballer who currently plays as a midfielder for Consett and the Gibraltar national football team.

== Club career ==
After coming through the youth ranks at Algeciras, Gomez moved to the UK in 2024 to study. In March 2025 he joined Blyth Spartans, appearing on the bench for the first time against Warrington Rylands. He made his debut on 19 August 2025 in a win against Newton Aycliffe, replacing international teammate Paddy McClafferty. He scored his first goal on 30 August against Garforth Town. After leaving Blyth in May 2026, he joined league rivals Consett on 17 July. He scored his first goal for the club in an FA Cup match against North Shields on 12 August.

== International career ==
Gomez was called up to the Gibraltar national football team for the first time by Scott Wiseman in September 2025. He made his senior international debut on 4 September 2025, in a friendly against Albania.

== Career statistics ==
=== International ===
As of 16 November 2026

Gibraltar
Year	Apps	Goals
2025	1	0
2026	6	0
Total	7	0
