= Kai Mauro =

Gibraltarian footballer

Personal information
- Full name: Kai Julián Mauro
- Date of birth: 30 May 2007 (age 19)
- Place of birth: Gibraltar
- Height: 1.77 m (5 ft 10 in)
- Position: Left-back

Team information
- Current team: Boston United
- Number: 27

Youth career
- 2018–2020: Lincoln Red Imps
- 2020–2022: Atlético Zabal
- 2022–2023: Algeciras
- 2023–2024: Atlético Zabal
- 2024–2025: Cádiz

Senior career*
Years	Team	Apps	(Gls)
2025–2026	Cádiz C	30	(0)
2026–	Boston United	6	(0)

International career^{‡}
2021	Gibraltar U15		
2022–2023	Gibraltar U16	5	(0)
2022–2023	Gibraltar U17	5	(0)
2024	Gibraltar U19	3	(0)
2024–	Gibraltar U21	8	(0)
2025–	Gibraltar	10	(0)
- * Club domestic league appearances and goals as of 5 September 2026 ‡ National team caps and goals as of 6 October 2026

Kai Julián Mauro (born 30 May 2007) is a Gibraltarian footballer who currently plays as a defender for National League side Boston United and the Gibraltar national football team.

== Club career ==
After starting his career in Gibraltar with Lincoln Red Imps, Mauro moved across the border in 2020 to join Atlético Zabal, part of the youth system at Real Balompédica Linense. After short spells at Algeciras and back at Atlético Zabal, Mauro joined the academy of Cádiz in June 2024. His performances led to him being promoted to the senior C team, also known as Balón de Cádiz, midway through the season, making his debut in the División de Honor Andaluza on 26 January 2025 against Castilleja, replacing compatriot Joachim Ostheider.

After breaking into the Balón de Cádiz side and making 23 appearances in the 2025–26 season, Mauro moved to England and joined Boston United on 25 June 2026.

== International career ==
Eligible for Gibraltar and Spain, Mauro has played for Gibraltar at all age groups from under-15 to under-21 level. He received his first senior callup in March 2024 against Lithuania, but did not play. He made his debut on 25 March 2025 against Czechia.

== Career statistics ==
As of match played 13 October 2026

Appearances and goals by club, season and competition
Club	Season	League			National Cup		League Cup		Continental		Other		Total	
Club	Season	Division	Apps	Goals	Apps	Goals	Apps	Goals	Apps	Goals	Apps	Goals	Apps	Goals
Cádiz C	2024–25	División de Honor	7	0	—		—		—		—		7	0
Cádiz C	2025–26	División de Honor	23	0	—		—		—		—		23	0
Cádiz C	Total		30	0	—		—		—		—		30	0
Boston United	2026–27	National League	6	0	0	0	3	0	—		0	0	9	0
Career total			36	0	0	0	3	0	0	0	0	0	39	0

=== International ===
As of 3 June 2026

Gibraltar
Year	Apps	Goals
2025	7	0
2026	3	0
Total	10	0
