= Jaylan Hankins =

Gibraltarian footballer

Personal information
- Full name: Jaylan Ernest Hankins
- Date of birth: 17 November 2000 (age 26)
- Place of birth: Gibraltar
- Height: 1.86 m (6 ft 1 in)
- Position: Goalkeeper

Team information
- Current team: Lincoln Red Imps
- Number: 13

Youth career
- Lincoln Red Imps

Senior career*
| Years | Team | Apps | (Gls) |
| 2015–2016 | Red Imps | 13 | (0) |
| 2016–2019 | Lincoln Red Imps | 9 | (0) |
| 2017 | → Europa Point (loan) | 12 | (0) |
| 2019–2020 | Las Palmas C | 4 | (0) |
| 2019–2020 | Las Palmas Atlético | 0 | (0) |
| 2020–2022 | Córdoba | 0 | (0) |
| 2020–2021 | → Extremadura (loan) | 0 | (0) |
| 2021–2022 | Córdoba B | 8 | (0) |
| 2022– | Lincoln Red Imps | 15 | (0) |
| 2022–2024 | → FCB Magpies (loan) | 18 | (0) |
| 2025 | → Europa (loan) | 6 | (0) |

International career^{‡}
- Gibraltar U16
| 2015–2016 | Gibraltar U17 | 5 | (0) |
| 2017 | Gibraltar U19 | 3 | (0) |
| 2019–2022 | Gibraltar U21 | 13 | (0) |
| 2024– | Gibraltar | 13 | (0) |
- * Club domestic league appearances and goals as of 10 October 2026 ‡ National team caps and goals as of 18 November 2026

Jaylan Ernest Hankins (born 17 November 2000) is a Gibraltarian footballer who plays as a goalkeeper for Lincoln Red Imps and the Gibraltar national team.

== Club career ==
Hankins came through the youth ranks of Lincoln Red Imps and made his senior breakthrough for their Gibraltar Second Division farm team Red Imps in 2015. In January 2017 he was one of a number of young prospects that joined Gibraltar Premier Division strugglers Europa Point on loan for the remainder of the season, playing 12 times for them but was unable to prevent relegation. However, his performances impressed his parent club, and he began to make infrequent appearances for Lincoln over the next two seasons before moving to the Canary Islands to play for UD Las Palmas. Despite only playing 4 games for their C team, he became a regular on the bench for their B team, albeit not making an appearance. Despite renewing his contract in April 2020, he attracted the attention of Córdoba who signed him that summer, subsequently loaning him to financially troubled Extremadura for the 2020–21 season. However, he did not play for the club and returned to Córdoba at the end of the season to play for their B team.

Despite agreeing a new contract in June 2022, he returned to Gibraltar later that summer and re-joined Lincoln Red Imps, who subsequently loaned him out to FCB Magpies. There, he won his first piece of silverware against his parent side as Magpies secured the 2022–23 Rock Cup. His loan was extended for a further season and he featured in Magpies' maiden Europa Conference League campaign against Dundalk, notably keeping a clean sheet in the first leg. However, a serious injury would rule him out of the majority of the season, only returning to action on 12 April 2024 in a 2–2 draw with Europa Point. After struggling to break into the first team upon his return to Lincoln, he joined Europa on loan in January 2025.

== International career ==
After playing through every international age group, Hankins made his debut for Gibraltar on 3 June 2024 in a friendly against Scotland. He kept his first clean sheet for them in the following match when they drew 0–0 with Wales on 6 June 2024.
