= 2027 UEFA European Under-21 Championship qualification Group B =

Football tournament qualification stage

Group B of the 2027 UEFA European Under-21 Championship qualifying competition consists of six teams: Portugal, Czech Republic, Bulgaria, Scotland, Azerbaijan, and Gibraltar. The composition of the nine groups in the qualifying group stage was decided by the draw held on 6 February 2025 at the UEFA headquarters in Nyon, Switzerland, with the teams seeded according to their coefficient ranking.

== Standings ==
| Pos | Team | Pld | W | D | L | GF | GA | GD | Pts | Qualification | Portugal | Czech Republic | Scotland | Bulgaria | Azerbaijan | Gibraltar |
|---|---|---|---|---|---|---|---|---|---|---|---|---|---|---|---|---|
| 1 | Portugal | 10 | 8 | 1 | 1 | 35 | 2 | +33 | 25 | Final tournament | — | 2–0 | 3–0 | 3–0 | 5–0 | 4–0 |
| 2 | Czech Republic | 10 | 5 | 3 | 2 | 17 | 6 | +11 | 18 | Play-offs | 0–0 | — | 2–0 | 1–0 | 5–0 | 5–0 |
| 3 | Scotland | 10 | 5 | 2 | 3 | 25 | 12 | +13 | 17 | | 0–2 | 0–0 | — | 1–0 | 5–2 | 12–0 |
| 4 | Bulgaria | 10 | 4 | 2 | 4 | 9 | 10 | −1 | 14 | | 2–1 | 2–1 | 0–2 | — | 0–0 | 3–0 |
| 5 | Azerbaijan | 10 | 2 | 4 | 4 | 11 | 24 | −13 | 10 | | 0–4 | 1–1 | 3–3 | 1–1 | — | 3–0 |
| 6 | Gibraltar | 10 | 0 | 0 | 10 | 1 | 44 | −43 | 0 | | 0–11 | 1–2 | 0–2 | 0–1 | 0–1 | — |

Source: UEFA
Rules for classification: Tiebreakers

== Matches ==
Times are CET/CEST, (Note: CEST (UTC+2) for matches until 26 October 2025 and from 29 March 2026 (matchday 1–3 and 7–10), and CET (UTC+1) for matches from 26 October 2025 to 29 March 2026 (matchday 4–6).) as listed by UEFA (local times, if different, are in parentheses).

5 September 2025
18:00

| Czech Republic | 2–0 | Scotland |
|---|---|---|
| Kričfaluši 22'; Eduardo 71' (pen.) | Report |

Městský fotbalový stadion Miroslava Valenty, Uherské Hradiště
Attendance: 5,819
Referee: Florian Badstübner (Germany)
5 September 2025
18:30 (19:30 UTC+3)

| Bulgaria | 3–0 | Gibraltar |
|---|---|---|
| Lazarov 17', 26'; Iliev 42' (pen.) | Report |

Stadion Georgi Benkovski, Pazardzhik
Attendance: 297
Referee: Artem Gasparyan (Armenia)
5 September 2025
20:30 (19:30 UTC+1)

| Portugal | 5–0 | Azerbaijan |
|---|---|---|
| Mora 48'; Quenda 52'; Barroso 56'; Forbs 73'; Semedo 90+3' | Report |

Estádio Cidade de Barcelos, Barcelos
Attendance: 7,377
Referee: Konstantinos Fellas (Cyprus)

9 September 2025
13:00

| Gibraltar | 1–2 | Czech Republic |
|---|---|---|
| Clinton 19' (pen.) | Report | Vojta 25'; Mašek 73' |

Europa Sports Park, Gibraltar
Attendance: 204
Referee: Michele Beltrano (San Marino)
9 September 2025
16:00 (18:00 UTC+4)

| Azerbaijan | 1–1 | Bulgaria |
|---|---|---|
| Rüstamov 41' | Report | Iliev 44' |

Dalga Arena, Baku
Attendance: 100
Referee: Florjan Lata (Albania)
9 September 2025
20:00 (19:00 UTC+1)

| Scotland | 0–2 | Portugal |
|---|---|---|
| | Report | Mora 20'; Fernandes 55' |

Fir Park, Motherwell
Attendance: 1,357
Referee: Michal Ocenas (Slovakia)

9 October 2025
18:30 (17:30 UTC+1)

| Scotland | 12–0 | Gibraltar |
|---|---|---|
| Lawrence 3', 27', 57', 60'; Mebude 22'; Gonzalez 29' (o.g.); Wilson 30', 32', 48'; Ure 33'; Thomson 75'; Mullen 83' | Report |

Dens Park, Dundee
Attendance: 594
Referee: Jóhan Hendrik Ellefsen (Faroe Islands)
10 October 2025
20:30 (19:30 UTC+1)

| Portugal | 3–0 | Bulgaria |
|---|---|---|
| Mora 58'; Parente 66'; Varela 79' | Report |

Estádio Municipal de Portimão, Portimão
Attendance: 3,327
Referee: Philip Farrugia (Malta)
10 October 2025
18:00

| Czech Republic | 5–0 | Azerbaijan |
|---|---|---|
| Mašek 40', 59', 75'; Ambros 55'; Planka 84' | Report |

Městský stadion, Karviná
Attendance: 2,812
Referee: Jovan Kachevski (North Macedonia)

14 October 2025
17:00 (19:00 UTC+4)

| Azerbaijan | 3–3 | Scotland |
|---|---|---|
| Aliyev 7', 47' (pen.); Ibrahimov 79' | Report | Watson 33'; Graham 44'; Cleall-Harding 90+1' |

Dalga Arena, Baku
Attendance: 150
Referee: Sayat Karabayev (Kazakhstan)
14 October 2025
18:00 (19:00 UTC+3)

| Bulgaria | 2–1 | Czech Republic |
|---|---|---|
| Iliev 34'; Panayotov 85' | Report | Šín 30' |

Stadion Georgi Benkovski, Pazardzhik
Attendance: 401
Referee: Ion Orlic (Moldova)
14 October 2025
19:00

| Gibraltar | 0–11 | Portugal |
|---|---|---|
| | Report | Travassos 8', 83'; Varela 11', 67'; Mora 28'; Baldé 51'; Carrington 56' (o.g.); Brás 57'; Chermiti 70'; Sá 90'; Quenda 90+2' |

Europa Sports Park, Gibraltar
Attendance: 533
Referee: Miloš Gigovic (Bosnia and Herzegovina)

15 November 2025
19:00

| Gibraltar | 0–2 | Scotland |
|---|---|---|
| | Report | Wilson 19'; Steven 82' |

Europa Sports Park, Gibraltar
Attendance: 189
Referee: Michele Beltrano (San Marino)

18 November 2025
18:00

| Czech Republic | 0–0 | Portugal |
|---|---|---|
| | Report |

Malšovická aréna, Hradec Králové
Attendance: 7,618
Referee: Jérémie Pignard (France)
18 November 2025
18:30 (17:30 UTC+0)

| Scotland | 1–0 | Bulgaria |
|---|---|---|
| Mebude 37' (pen.) | Report |

Fir Park, Motherwell
Attendance: 457
Referee: Wojciech Myć (Poland)
18 November 2025
19:00

| Gibraltar | 0–1 | Azerbaijan |
|---|---|---|
| | Report | M. Mammadov 54' |

Europa Sports Park, Gibraltar
Attendance: 129
Referee: Andrei Chivulete (Romania)

27 March 2026
12:00 (15:00 UTC+4)

| Azerbaijan | 0–4 | Portugal |
|---|---|---|
| | Report | G. Moreira 51'; Parente 54'; Chermiti 66'; Simões 75' |

Neftçi Arena, Baku
Attendance: 120
Referee: Christos Vergetis (Greece)
27 March 2026
19:00

| Gibraltar | 0–1 | Bulgaria |
|---|---|---|
| | Report | Lazarov 26' |

Europa Sports Park, Gibraltar
Attendance: 223
Referee: Mihály Káprály (Ukraine)
27 March 2026
20:00 (19:00 UTC+0)

| Scotland | 0–0 | Czech Republic |
|---|---|---|
| | Report |

Dens Park, Dundee
Attendance: 1,268
Referee: Alejandro Muñiz Ruiz (Spain)

31 March 2026
17:00

| Czech Republic | 5–0 | Gibraltar |
|---|---|---|
| Šiler 14'; Kričfaluši 45+3' (pen.); Mikulenka 47', 86', 89' | Report |

Letní stadion, Chomutov
Attendance: 2,021
Referee: Peiman Simani (Finland)
31 March 2026
18:00 (19:00 UTC+3)

| Bulgaria | 0–0 | Azerbaijan |
|---|---|---|
| | Report |

Hristo Botev Stadium, Plovdiv
Attendance: 1,869
Referee: Denys Shurman (Ukraine)
31 March 2026
20:30 (19:30 UTC+1)

| Portugal | 3–0 | Scotland |
|---|---|---|
| Fernandes 29'; Banjaqui 44'; G. Moreira 54' | Report |

Estádio António Coimbra da Mota, Estoril
Attendance: 3,973
Referee: Igor Stojchevski (Macedonia)

25 September 2026
15:45 (17:45 UTC+4)

| Azerbaijan | 1–1 | Czech Republic |
|---|---|---|
| Ahmadov 45' | Report | Lissah 38' |

Dalga Arena, Baku
Attendance: 100
Referee: Aaron O'Dowd (Republic of Ireland)
25 September 2026
17:30 (18:30 UTC+3)

| Bulgaria | 2–1 | Portugal |
|---|---|---|
| Pavlov 87'; Marinov 90+1' | Report | Varela 51' |

Stadion Georgi Benkovski, Pazardzhik
Attendance: 1,129
Referee: Igor Shumilov (Belarus)

30 September 2026
18:00

| Czech Republic | 1–0 | Bulgaria |
|---|---|---|
| Mašek 55' | Report |

Malšovická aréna, Hradec Králové
Attendance: 7,030
Referee: Damian Kos (Poland)
30 September 2026
20:30 (19:30 UTC+1)

| Scotland | 5–2 | Azerbaijan |
|---|---|---|
| Stewart 24', 26'; Wilson 29'; T. Fletcher 60'; Wales 81' | Report | Akhundzade 21'; R. Mammadov 70' |

Rugby Park, Kilmarnock
Attendance: 1,280
Referee: Mathias Støfringshaug (Norway)
30 September 2026
21:00 (19:00 UTC+0)

| Portugal | 4–0 | Gibraltar |
|---|---|---|
| Mora 21'; Rêgo 45'; Oliveira 89'; Peacock 90+1' (o.g.) | Report |

Estádio de São Miguel, Ponta Delgada
Attendance: 8,943
Referee: Andreu Simarro (Andorra)

6 October 2026
15:45 (17:45 UTC+4)

| Azerbaijan | 3–0 | Gibraltar |
|---|---|---|
| Ahmadzada 8'; Salyanskiy 43', 51' | Report |

Bank Respublika Arena, Masazir
Attendance: 300
Referee: Jasmin Sabotic (Luxembourg)
6 October 2026
18:30 (17:30 UTC+1)

| Portugal | 2–0 | Czech Republic |
|---|---|---|
| Banjaqui 28'; A. Moreira 55' | Report |

Estádio Dr. Magalhães Pessoa, Leiria
Attendance: 4,021
Referee: Adam Ladebäck (Sweden)
6 October 2026
18:30 (19:30 UTC+3)

| Bulgaria | 0–2 | Scotland |
|---|---|---|
| | Report | Stewart 32'; Wales 90+2' |

Stadion Georgi Benkovski, Pazardzhik
Attendance: 662
Referee: Granit Maqedonci (Sweden)

== Goalscorers ==
There were 98 goals scored in 30 matches, for an average of 3.27 goals per match.

5 goals

- (Czech Republic national under-21 football team) Lukáš Mašek
- (Portugal national under-21 football team) Rodrigo Mora
- (Scotland national under-21 football team) James Wilson

4 goals

- (Portugal national under-21 football team) Gustavo Varela
- (Scotland national under-21 football team) Emilio Lawrence

3 goals

- (Bulgaria national under-21 football team) Nikola Iliev
- (Bulgaria national under-21 football team) Georgi Lazarov
- (Czech Republic national under-21 football team) Matěj Mikulenka
- (Scotland national under-21 football team) Barney Stewart

2 goals

- (Azerbaijan national under-21 football team) Khayal Aliyev
- (Azerbaijan national under-21 football team) Ağadadaş Salyanski
- (Czech Republic national under-21 football team) Ondřej Kričfaluši
- (Portugal national under-21 football team) Daniel Banjaqui
- (Portugal national under-21 football team) Youssef Chermiti
- (Portugal national under-21 football team) Mateus Fernandes
- (Portugal national under-21 football team) Roger Fernandes
- (Portugal national under-21 football team) Gonçalo Moreira
- (Portugal national under-21 football team) Tiago Parente
- (Portugal national under-21 football team) Geovany Quenda
- (Portugal national under-21 football team) Diogo Travassos
- (Scotland national under-21 football team) Adedire Mebude
- (Scotland national under-21 football team) Bobby Wales

1 goal

- (Azerbaijan national under-21 football team) Eshqin Ahmadov
- (Azerbaijan national under-21 football team) Nihad Ahmadzadeh
- (Azerbaijan national under-21 football team) Nariman Akhundzade
- (Azerbaijan national under-21 football team) Shahin Ibrahimov
- (Azerbaijan national under-21 football team) Murad Mammadov
- (Azerbaijan national under-21 football team) Raul Mammadov
- (Azerbaijan national under-21 football team) Emin Rüstamov
- (Bulgaria national under-21 football team) Aleksandar Marinov
- (Bulgaria national under-21 football team) Petko Panayotov
- (Bulgaria national under-21 football team) Todor Pavlov
- (Czech Republic national under-21 football team) Lukáš Ambros
- (Czech Republic national under-21 football team) Yannick Eduardo
- (Czech Republic national under-21 football team) Filip Lissah
- (Czech Republic national under-21 football team) David Planka
- (Czech Republic national under-21 football team) Radek Šiler
- (Czech Republic national under-21 football team) Matěj Šín
- (Czech Republic national under-21 football team) Matyáš Vojta
- (Gibraltar national under-21 football team) Kyle Clinton
- (Portugal national under-21 football team) Leonardo Barroso
- (Portugal national under-21 football team) Gabriel Brás
- (Portugal national under-21 football team) Carlos Forbs
- (Portugal national under-21 football team) Afonso Moreira
- (Portugal national under-21 football team) Gonçalo Oliveira
- (Portugal national under-21 football team) Rodrigo Rêgo
- (Portugal national under-21 football team) Gustavo Sá
- (Portugal national under-21 football team) Vivaldo Semedo
- (Portugal national under-21 football team) João Simões
- (Scotland national under-21 football team) Samuel Cleall-Harding
- (Scotland national under-21 football team) Tyler Fletcher
- (Scotland national under-21 football team) Luke Graham
- (Scotland national under-21 football team) Jeremiah Mullen
- (Scotland national under-21 football team) Taylor Steven
- (Scotland national under-21 football team) Miller Thomson
- (Scotland national under-21 football team) Kyle Ure
- (Scotland national under-21 football team) David Watson

1 own goal

- (Gibraltar national under-21 football team) Kevan Gonzalez (against Scotland)
- (Gibraltar national under-21 football team) Javan Peacock (against Portugal)
