= Evan De Haro =

Gibraltarian footballer

Personal information
- Full name: Evan Francis de Haro
- Date of birth: 28 September 2002 (age 24)
- Place of birth: Gibraltar
- Height: 1.77 m (5 ft 10 in)
- Position: Midfielder

Team information
- Current team: St Joseph's
- Number: 6

Youth career
- –2019: Lincoln Red Imps
- 2019–2020: Algeciras

College career
Years	Team	Apps	(Gls)
2021–2025	UCLan Men's FC		

Senior career*
Years	Team	Apps	(Gls)
2018–2019	Lincoln Red Imps	1	(0)
2020–2021	Europa	1	(0)
2021	→ Bruno's Magpies (loan)	8	(1)
2021–2026	FC Magpies	36	(1)
2021–2023	→ Lancaster City (loan)	0	(0)
2023–2024	→ Winstanley Warriors (loan)	0	(0)
2026	→ Lions Gibraltar (loan)	9	(0)
2026–	St Joseph's	7	(1)

International career^{‡}
- Gibraltar U16
2017–2018	Gibraltar U17	7	(0)
2019	Gibraltar U19	5	(0)
2019–2024	Gibraltar U21	19	(0)
2023–	Gibraltar	13	(0)
- * Club domestic league appearances and goals as of 21 November 2026 ‡ National team caps and goals as of 23 September 2026

Evan Francis de Haro (born 28 September 2002) is a Gibraltarian association footballer who currently plays as a midfielder for St Joseph's. He has represented Gibraltar from U16 to senior level, and currently represents the Gibraltar national football team.

== Career ==
Evan De Haro started his career at Lincoln Red Imps and made his senior debut on 19 May 2019, playing 90 minutes in a 2–0 defeat to Mons Calpe. That summer, he moved to Spain to play for Algeciras, spending one season with their Juvenil team before returning to the Rock in 2020 to sign with Europa. Finishing the 2020–21 season on loan with Bruno's Magpies, he joined them permanently in the summer before moving to the UK to study at the University of Central Lancashire, during which time he played with Lancaster City U23. In summer 2022 he briefly returned from his loan to play in Magpies' maiden UEFA Europa Conference League campaign. While at UCLan, he played for their football team in the BUCS Football League and served as captain. He also spent time at Cheshire Football League side Winstanley Warriors to train, although did not play.

During the 2023–24 season, De Haro made his long-awaited league debut for Magpies as a permanent player, coming on as a half-time substitute in a 7–2 win over College 1975 on 17 February 2024. He joined St Joseph's on 22 June 2026.

== International career ==
De Haro has played for Gibraltar at every youth level from under-16 to under-21 level, captaining the under-21s during the 2025 UEFA European Under-21 Championship qualification campaign. After earning his first senior call-up in March 2022, De Haro made his senior international debut on 11 October 2023 in a friendly against Wales, coming on in the second half for Ethan Jolley in a 4–0 defeat.

He notably played 3 games in 3 countries across 3 days in October 2023 - first, appearing as an 83rd minute substitute for Gibraltar against the Republic of Ireland on 16 October 2023 in Faro, Portugal, then captaining the under-21s against the Netherlands on 17 October in Gibraltar before coming off the bench for UCLan against UCFB Etihad in Preston, Lancashire on 18 October 2023.

== Basketball ==
De Haro played for the Gibraltar men's national under-16 basketball team at the 2018 FIBA U16 European Championship Division C held in San Marino, averaging three points, 7.2 rebounds, and 1.2 assists per game.

== Personal life ==
In an interview with BBC Radio Lancashire in December 2023, De Haro outlined his aspiration to become a firefighter.

== Honours ==
With FCB Magpies

- GFA Challenge Trophy: 2020–21
