= Kyle Clinton =

Gibraltarian footballer

Personal information
- Date of birth: 18 March 2004 (age 22)
- Place of birth: Gibraltar
- Position: Midfielder

Team information
- Current team: FC Magpies
- Number: 19

Youth career
- –2020: Lincoln Red Imps

Senior career*
Years	Team	Apps	(Gls)
2020–2026	Lincoln Red Imps	35	(2)
2024–2025	→ College 1975 (loan)	13	(2)
2026–	FC Magpies	6	(2)

International career^{‡}
2019	Gibraltar U16	1	(0)
2019	Gibraltar U17	2	(0)
2022–	Gibraltar U21	23	(1)
2025–	Gibraltar	2	(0)
- * Club domestic league appearances and goals as of 22 November 2026 ‡ National team caps and goals as of 6 October 2026

Kyle Clinton (born 18 March 2004) is a Gibraltarian footballer who currently plays as a midfielder for FC Magpies and the Gibraltar national football team.

== Club career ==
Clinton came through the ranks at Lincoln Red Imps, making his debut at the age of 16 on 2 December 2020 against Europa Point. In the 2024–25 season, he spent time on loan at College 1975, making his debut on 20 September 2024 against Glacis United.

Following his release from Lincoln Red Imps, he joined FC Magpies on 1 June 2026.

== International career ==
Clinton made his senior international debut for Gibraltar on 8 October 2025, against New Caledonia.

== Career statistics ==
=== International ===
As of 12 October 2025

Gibraltar
Year	Apps	Goals
2025	2	0
Total	2	0
