= Jayvan Garro =

Gibraltarian footballer

Personal information
- Date of birth: 1 June 2008 (age 18)
- Place of birth: Gibraltar
- Positions: Centre-back; defensive midfielder

Team information
- Current team: Mons Calpe
- Number: 5

Youth career
- 2019–2020: Europa
- 2020–2022: Taraguilla
- 2022–2024: Atlético Zabal
- 2024–2026: Lincoln Red Imps

Senior career*
Years	Team	Apps	(Gls)
2026–	Mons Calpe	5	(0)

International career^{‡}
2022	Gibraltar U15	3	(0)
2023–2024	Gibraltar U16	5	(0)
2023–2026	Gibraltar U17	6	(0)
2024–	Gibraltar U19	4	(0)
2026–	Gibraltar	3	(0)
- * Club domestic league appearances and goals as of 20 November 2026 ‡ National team caps and goals as of 23 September 2026

Jayvan Orlando Garro (born 1 June 2008) is a Gibraltarian association footballer who plays as a defender for Mons Calpe and the Gibraltar national football team.

== Club career ==
After several years playing youth football in Spain, Garro joined Lincoln Red Imps in January 2024, during which time he played in the UEFA Youth League. In summer 2026, he joined Mons Calpe.

== International career ==
Garro made his senior debut for Gibraltar on 3 June 2026, in a 4–0 win over British Virgin Islands in a friendly.

== Career statistics ==
As of match played 20 November 2026

Appearances and goals by club, season and competition
Club	Season	League			National Cup		League Cup		Continental		Other		Total	
Club	Season	Division	Apps	Goals	Apps	Goals	Apps	Goals	Apps	Goals	Apps	Goals	Apps	Goals
Mons Calpe	2026–27	Gibraltar Football League	5	0	0	0	—		—		—		5	0
Career total			5	0	0	0	0	0	0	0	0	0	5	0

=== International ===
As of match played 23 September 2026

Gibraltar
Year	Apps	Goals
2026	3	0
Total	3	0
