= Han Stevens =

Gibraltarian footballer

Personal information
- Full name: Han Stevens
- Date of birth: 16 April 2005 (age 21)
- Place of birth: Gibraltar
- Height: 1.84 m (6 ft 0 in)
- Position: Midfielder

Team information
- Current team: FC Magpies
- Number: 8

Youth career
- 2013–2015: Roda JC Kerkrade
- 2015–2020: Leicester City
- 2020–2023: Boston United

Senior career*
Years	Team	Apps	(Gls)
2021–2023	Boston United	1	(0)
2021–2022	→ Bourne Town (loan)	16	(0)
2022	→ West Bridgford (loan)	5	(3)
2022–2023	→ Sleaford Town (loan)	3	(0)
2023	→ Pinchbeck United (loan)	9	(0)
2023–	FC Magpies	60	(4)

International career^{‡}
2022–2023	Gibraltar U19	8	(0)
2023–	Gibraltar U21	18	(0)
2026–	Gibraltar	7	(0)
- * Club domestic league appearances and goals as of 22 November 2026 ‡ National team caps and goals as of 18 November 2026

Han Stevens (born 16 April 2005) is a Gibraltarian association footballer who plays as a midfielder for FC Magpies and the Gibraltar national football team.

== Club career ==
After coming through the youth systems of Leicester City, Roda JC and Boston United, Stevens first experienced senior football on loan with Bourne Town before further loan spells at West Bridgford, Sleaford Town and Pinchbeck United. Following his departure from the Pilgrims in 2023, he moved to Gibraltar to join FC Magpies.

== International career ==
Stevens is eligible for England through his father, the Netherlands through his mother, and Gibraltar by birth. He was first called up by Gibraltar for their under-19 team for a training camp in May 2022. He made his senior debut for Gibraltar on 3 June 2026, in a 4–0 win over British Virgin Islands in a friendly.

== Career statistics ==
=== International ===
As of 16 November 2026

Gibraltar
Year	Apps	Goals
2026	7	0
Total	7	0
