= Gibraltar national under-21 football team =

Gibraltar Under-21
- Association: Gibraltar Football Association
- Confederation: UEFA (Europe)
- Head coach: David Ochello
- Captain: Kyle Clinton
- Most caps: Dylan Borge (25)
- Top scorer: Dylan Borge (2)
- Home stadium: Victoria Stadium
- FIFA code: GIB
First colours	Second colours

First international
- Austria 3–0 Gibraltar (Ritzing, Austria; 8 June 2017)

Biggest win
- Gibraltar 1–0 Macedonia (Faro/Loulé, Portugal; 10 October 2017); Moldova 1–2 Gibraltar (Chișinău, Moldova; 21 November 2023)

Biggest defeat
- Scotland 12–0 Gibraltar (Dundee, Scotland; 9 October 2025)

UEFA U-21 Championship
- Appearances: 0 (first in 0)
- Best result: Never Qualified

The Gibraltar national under-21 football team represents Gibraltar in football competitions at under-21 level and is controlled by the Gibraltar Football Association. It is a full member of FIFA and is therefore eligible to enter any FIFA-sanctioned tournaments. Gibraltar applied for full UEFA membership and was accepted by the UEFA Congress in May 2013 and can therefore compete in the UEFA European Under-21 Championship beginning with the 2015 edition of the tournament, although they did not participate until 2017, in qualification for the 2019 UEFA European Under-21 Championship.

== UEFA Acceptance ==
Since being accepted into UEFA in May 2013, they have not formed under-21 team, until announcement in December 2016. The Gibraltar Football Association announced that Gibraltar will be participating in the UEFA European Under-21 Championship for the first time as from 2017 with qualifying games for the 2019 UEFA European Under-21 Championship, that will take place in Italy. The draw for the qualifiers was in Switzerland on 26 January 2017 and Gibraltar will play in Group 7.

They played their first ever international on 8 June 2017, against Austria, losing 3–0. After losing their next 4 games without scoring, the Gibraltar U21 team secured a historic 1–0 win over Macedonia on 10 October 2017, with a goal from captain Graeme Torrilla meaning that Gibraltar earned their first competitive win at any level since joining UEFA.

== Competition history ==
=== UEFA European Under-21 Football Championship ===
UEFA Euro U-21 Record								Qualification record					
Year	Round	Pld	W	D	L	GF	GA	Pld	W	D	L	GF	GA
1978 to 2013	Not a UEFA member							Not a UEFA member					
(Czech Republic); 2015	Did not enter							Did not enter					
(Poland); 2017	Did not enter							Did not enter					
(Italy) (San Marino); 2019	Did not qualify							10	1	0	9	2	36
(Hungary) (Slovenia); 2021	Did not qualify							8	0	0	8	0	37
(Romania) (Georgia (country)); 2023	Did not qualify							10	0	1	9	1	41
(Slovakia); 2025	Did not qualify							10	1	0	9	3	31
(Albania) (Serbia); 2027	Did not qualify							8	0	0	8	1	37
Total	0/25	0	0	0	0	0	0	38	2	1	35	6	145

=== Record of matches ===
The following table shows Gibraltar under-21s all-time international record, correct as of 6 October 2026. Only official matches are included.

Opponents	P	W	D	L	GF	GA	GD	Win %	First	Last
Armenia	2	0	0	2	0	4	−4	0.00	2017	2017
Austria	2	0	0	2	0	8	−8	0.00	2017	2018
Azerbaijan	2	0	0	2	0	4	−4	0.00	2025	2026
Belarus	2	0	0	2	0	12	−12	0.00	2019	2019
Bulgaria	4	0	1	3	1	10	−9	0.00	2021	2026
Cyprus	1	0	0	1	0	1	−1	0.00	2019	2019
Czech Republic	2	0	0	2	1	7	−6	0.00	2025	2026
Georgia	2	0	0	2	0	4	−4	0.00	2023	2024
Iraq	1	0	0	1	0	2	−2	0.00	2023	2023
Liechtenstein	1	0	0	1	1	3	−2	0.00	2025	2025
Moldova	4	1	0	3	3	9	−6	25.00	2021	2023
Netherlands	6	0	0	6	0	30	−30	0.00	2019	2023
North Macedonia	4	1	0	3	2	9	−7	25.00	2017	2024
Norway	1	0	0	1	0	6	−6	0.00	2020	2020
Portugal	4	0	0	4	0	22	−22	0.00	2019	2026
Russia	2	0	0	2	0	8	−8	0.00	2017	2018
San Marino	2	0	1	1	0	3	−3	0.00	2024	2024
Scotland	2	0	0	2	0	14	−14	0.00	2025	2025
Serbia	2	0	0	2	0	10	−10	0.00	2017	2018
Sweden	2	0	0	2	0	14	−14	0.00	2023	2024
Switzerland	2	0	0	2	0	8	−8	0.00	2021	2021
Uzbekistan	1	0	0	1	0	4	−4	0.00	2023	2023
Wales	2	0	0	2	0	9	−9	0.00	2021	2022
Total	53	2	2	49	8	200	−192	3.77	2017	2026

=== 2027 UEFA European Under-21 Football Championship qualification ===
Pos	Team	Pld	W	D	L	GF	GA	GD	Pts	Qualification	Portugal	Czech Republic	Scotland	Bulgaria	Azerbaijan	Gibraltar
1	Portugal	10	8	1	1	35	2	+33	25	Final tournament	—	2–0	3–0	3–0	5–0	4–0
2	Czech Republic	10	5	3	2	17	6	+11	18	Play-offs	0–0	—	2–0	1–0	5–0	5–0
3	Scotland	10	5	2	3	25	12	+13	17		0–2	0–0	—	1–0	5–2	12–0
4	Bulgaria	10	4	2	4	9	10	−1	14		2–1	2–1	0–2	—	0–0	3–0
5	Azerbaijan	10	2	4	4	11	24	−13	10		0–4	1–1	3–3	1–1	—	3–0
6	Gibraltar	10	0	0	10	1	44	−43	0		0–11	1–2	0–2	0–1	0–1	—

Source: UEFA

== Matches ==
=== 2025 ===
15 November 2025 2027 UEFA U-21 Qualification	Gibraltar	0–2	Scotland	Europa Point, Gibraltar
19:00		Report	Wilson 19'; Steven 82'	Stadium: Europa Point Stadium; Referee: Michele Beltrano (San Marino)

18 November 2025 2027 UEFA U-21 Qualification	Gibraltar	0–1	Azerbaijan	Europa Point, Gibraltar
19:00		Report	Mammadov 54'	Stadium: Europa Point Stadium; Referee: Andrei Chivulete (Romania)

=== 2026 ===
27 March 2026 2027 UEFA U-21 Qualification	Gibraltar	0–1	Bulgaria	Europa Point, Gibraltar
19:00		Report	Lazarov 26'	Stadium: Europa Point Stadium; Attendance: 223; Referee: Mihály Káprály (Hungary)

31 March 2026 2027 UEFA U-21 Qualification	Czech Republic	5–0	Gibraltar	Chomutov, Czech Republic
17:00	Šiler 14'; Kričfaluši 45+3' (pen.); Mikulenka 47', 86', 89'	Report		Stadium: Letní stadion Attendance: 2,021; Referee: Peiman Simani (Finland)

30 September 2026 2027 UEFA U-21 Qualification	Portugal	4–0	Gibraltar	Ponta Delgada, Portugal
21:00 (19:00 UTC+0)	Mora 21'; Rêgo 45'; Oliveira 89'; Peacock 90+1' (o.g.)	Report		Stadium: Estádio de São Miguel; Attendance: 8,943; Referee: Andreu Simarro (Andorra)

6 October 2026 2027 UEFA U-21 Qualification	Azerbaijan	3–0	Gibraltar	Masazir, Azerbaijan
15:45 (17:45 UTC+4)	Ahmadzada 8'; Salyanskiy 43', 51'	Report		Stadium: Bank Respublika Arena; Referee: Jasmin Sabotic (Luxembourg)

== Players ==
=== Current squad ===
For the 2027 UEFA European Under-21 Championship qualification and finals, players born on or after 1 January 2004 are eligible.

The following players were called up for the following 2027 UEFA European Under-21 Championship qualification games:

- Match date: 30 September and 6 October 2026
- Opposition: Portugal and Azerbaijan
- Caps and goals correct as of: 6 October 2026, after the match against Azerbaijan.

Names in bold denote players who have been capped for the senior team.

No.	Pos.	Player	Date of birth (age)	Caps	Goals	Club
1	GK	Harry Victor	29 January 2004 (age 22)	14	0	(Gibraltar Football Association) Glacis United
13	GK	Ryan Smith	21 April 2007 (age 19)	0	0	(Football Association of Wales) Rhydymwyn
23	GK	Ethan Bonfante	12 August 2009 (age 17)	0	0	(Gibraltar Football Association) Europa
	GK	Mikey Charvetto	26 September 2007 (age 19)	0	0	(Gibraltar Football Association) Europa Point
4	DF	Julian Britto	28 June 2004 (age 22)	24	0	(Gibraltar Football Association) FC Magpies
5	DF	**Tayler Carrington**	28 May 2006 (age 20)	18	1	(Royal Spanish Football Federation) Calamocha
12	DF	Jay Coombes	9 March 2007 (age 19)	8	0	(Gibraltar Football Association) Lincoln Red Imps
17	DF	**Kai Mauro**	30 May 2007 (age 19)	8	0	(The Football Association) Boston United
14	DF	Evan Busto	9 June 2005 (age 21)	7	0	(Gibraltar Football Association) Lions Gibraltar
3	DF	Angelo Parody	23 June 2007 (age 19)	6	0	(Gibraltar Football Association) Mons Calpe
	DF	Kaleem Smith	15 January 2006 (age 20)	6	0	(Gibraltar Football Association) College 1975
2	DF	Joachim Ostheider	10 April 2007 (age 19)	4	0	(Royal Spanish Football Federation) Estepona B
10	MF	**Kyle Clinton** (captain)	18 March 2004 (age 22)	23	1	(Gibraltar Football Association) FC Magpies
7	MF	Javan Peacock	31 July 2006 (age 20)	12	0	(Gibraltar Football Association) FC Magpies
6	MF	Amos Federico	23 April 2007 (age 19)	9	0	(The Football Association) Loughborough Students
8	MF	**Rafi Emrani**	27 March 2005 (age 21)	8	0	(Gibraltar Football Association) Lynx
18	MF	Carl De Torres	26 February 2005 (age 21)	7	0	(Gibraltar Football Association) FC Magpies
	MF	Karim Bousselham	7 October 2007 (age 19)	7	0	(Gibraltar Football Association) Mons Calpe
11	MF	Matthew Plumb	25 October 2004 (age 22)	5	0	(Gibraltar Football Association) Lions Gibraltar
19	MF	Owen McMahon	25 June 2008 (age 18)	2	0	(Gibraltar Football Association) Lincoln Red Imps
	MF	Omar Errouas	14 February 2006 (age 20)	0	0	(Gibraltar Football Association) Lions Gibraltar
	MF	Tristam Moya	22 December 2007 (age 18)	0	0	(Gibraltar Football Association) College 1975
9	FW	James Caetano	27 September 2004 (age 22)	22	1	(Gibraltar Football Association) College 1975
	FW	Lee Chipolina	27 February 2006 (age 20)	6	0	(Gibraltar Football Association) FC Magpies
15	FW	Finlay Cawthorn	15 March 2004 (age 22)	2	0	(Gibraltar Football Association) College 1975
	FW	Aiden Mansfield	3 June 2006 (age 20)	1	0	(Gibraltar Football Association) Hound Dogs
	FW	Leon Ramirez	23 April 2007 (age 19)	0	0	(Gibraltar Football Association) Europa

=== Recent call-ups ===
The following players have been called up within the past twelve months of the last match, or withdrew from the current squad due to injury or suspension, and remain eligible.

Pos.	Player	Date of birth (age)	Caps	Goals	Club	Latest call-up
GK	Julian Guillem	29 November 2010 (age 15)	0	0	(Gibraltar) St Joseph's	v. Czech Republic, 31 March 2026
GK	Victor Huart	5 September 2008 (age 18)	1	0	(England) Chesterfield	v. Azerbaijan, 18 November 2025
GK	Thomas Recagno	11 September 2007 (age 19)	2	0	(Gibraltar) FC Magpies	v. Czech Republic, 9 September 2025
DF	**Jayvan Garro**	1 June 2008 (age 18)	0	0	(Gibraltar) Mons Calpe	v. Portugal, 30 September 2026^{SEN}
DF	Kevan Gonzalez	19 October 2005 (age 21)	8	0	(Gibraltar) Glacis United	v. Czech Republic, 31 March 2026
DF	Owen Fortunato	27 October 2008 (age 18)	3	0	(England) Chesterfield	v. Czech Republic, 31 March 2026
DF	Adam Achhoud	3 September 2006 (age 20)	1	0	(Gibraltar) Europa Point	v. Czech Republic, 31 March 2026
DF	Shane Borda	7 May 2005 (age 21)	0	0	(Gibraltar) Hound Dogs	v. Czech Republic, 31 March 2026
DF	Jayron Negron	25 September 2005 (age 21)	2	0	(Gibraltar) Glacis United	v. Scotland, 15 November 2025
DF	**Paddy McClafferty**	19 September 2004 (age 22)	8	0	(Gibraltar) St Joseph's	v. Portugal, 14 October 2025
DF	Jayden Villa	12 May 2005 (age 21)	3	0	(Gibraltar) Lynx	v. Sweden, 6 September 2024^{PRE}
DF	Leon Avellano	25 April 2004 (age 22)	1	0	(Gibraltar) Lynx Futsal	v. San Marino, 8 June 2024
DF	Johnny Rush	4 July 2006 (age 20)	6	0	(United States) UAB Blazers	v. Georgia, 26 March 2024
MF	**Han Stevens**	16 April 2005 (age 21)	18	0	(Gibraltar) FC Magpies	v. Czech Republic, 31 March 2026
MF	**Jesse Gomez**	11 October 2005 (age 21)	8	0	(England) Consett	v. Czech Republic, 31 March 2026
MF	Tristan Holden	1 April 2007 (age 19)	2	0	(England) Faversham Strike Force	v. Czech Republic, 31 March 2026
MF	Stefan Desoiza	15 November 2007 (age 18)	0	0	(Gibraltar) Lincoln Red Imps	v. Czech Republic, 31 March 2026
MF	Max Bautista	7 May 2008 (age 18)	3	0	(Gibraltar) Europa Point	v. Azerbaijan, 18 November 2025
MF	**Liam Jessop**	13 August 2005 (age 21)	9	0	(Northern Ireland) Portadown	v. Portugal, 14 October 2025
MF	**Jeremy Perera**	14 January 2006 (age 20)	5	0	(England) Silsden	v. Czech Republic, 9 September 2025
MF	**Nicholas Pozo**	19 January 2005 (age 21)	4	0	(England) Boston United	v. North Macedonia, 9 September 2024
MF	Giovanni Soleci	2 February 2007 (age 19)	1	0	(Gibraltar) Europa	v. San Marino, 8 June 2024
MF	**James Scanlon**	28 September 2006 (age 20)	4	0	(England) Arsenal	v. Moldova, 21 November 2023
FW	**Leon Mason**	16 May 2007 (age 19)	11	0	(Gibraltar) Lincoln Red Imps	v. Czech Republic, 31 March 2026
FW	Javier Martinez	13 September 2006 (age 20)	0	0	Free Agent	v. Czech Republic, 31 March 2026
FW	**Carlos Richards**	22 June 2005 (age 21)	10	0	(England) Three Bridges	v. Azerbaijan, 18 November 2025
FW	**Luca Scanlon**	13 July 2009 (age 17)	4	0	(England) Burnley	v. Azerbaijan, 18 November 2025
FW	**Jaiden Bartolo**	10 February 2006 (age 20)	5	0	(England) Salisbury	v. Scotland, 15 November 2025^{SEN}
FW	Jonathan Sciortino	29 December 2005 (age 20)	0	0	(Gibraltar) Lynx	v. Sweden, 6 September 2024^{PRE}
FW	Ashton Hancock	5 October 2006 (age 20)	2	0	(Gibraltar) Lincoln Red Imps	v. San Marino, 8 June 2024
FW	Ángel González	19 September 2005 (age 21)	1	0	(England) Shortwood United	v. Georgia, 26 March 2024
^{INJ} Withdrew from the squad due to an injury^{PRE} Preliminary squad^{WD} Withdrew for other reasons

== Gibraltar under-21 managers ==
Up to date as of 6 October 2026

Manager	Nation	Gibraltar u-21 career	Played	Won	Drawn	Lost	GF	GA	Win %
Aaron Asquez	(Gibraltar)	2017–2019	10	1	0	9	2	36	10.00
David Ochello	(Gibraltar)	2019–present	39	1	2	36	5	146	2.56
Michael Felice (caretaker)	(Gibraltar)	2020, 2023	4	0	0	4	1	19	0.00

Note: Michael Felice served as caretaker manager in late 2020 while David Ochello was on personal leave, and again in June 2023.

== Personnel ==
=== Current technical staff ===
As of 20 March 2019

Position	Name
Head coach	(Gibraltar) David Ochello
Assistant coach	(Gibraltar) Michael Felice
Goalkeeping coach	(Gibraltar) Jordan Perez
Physio	(Gibraltar) Chris Shaw
Data Analyst	(Gibraltar) Matthew Langtry

== Player records ==
As of 6 October 2026

=== Most capped ===
#	Name	Career	Caps	Goals
1	Dylan Borge	2019–2024	25	2
2	**Julian Britto**	2021–	24	0
3	**Kyle Clinton**	2022–	23	1
4	**James Caetano**	2021–	22	1
5	Evan De Haro	2019–2024	19	0
6	**Tayler Carrington**	2023–	18	1
6	Ayoub El Hmidi	2019–2022	18	0
6	**Han Stevens**	2023–	18	0
6	Bilal Douah	2021–2024	18	0
10	Dylan Peacock	2019–2022	15	1
10	Ethal Llambias	2019–2022	15	0
10	James Parkinson	2019–2022	15	0
10	Shay Jones	2021–2024	15	0

=== Most goals ===
Players with an equal number of goals are ranked in order of average.

#	Name	Career	Caps	Goals	Average
1	Dylan Borge	2019–2024	25	2	0.08
2	Leon Clinton	2017–2020	10	1	0.1
2	Graeme Torrilla	2017–2018	10	1	0.1
2	**Tayler Carrington**	2023–	18	1	0.056
2	Dylan Peacock	2019–2022	15	1	0.067
2	**James Caetano**	2021–	22	1	0.045
2	**Kyle Clinton**	2022–	23	1	0.043

=== Captains ===
#	Player	Career	Captain Caps	Total Caps
1	Graeme Torrilla	2017–2018	10	10
2	Jaylan Hankins	2019–2022	9	13
2	**Kyle Clinton**	2022–	9	23
4	Dylan Borge	2019–2024	7	25
5	Evan De Haro	2019–2024	4	19
6	Andrew Hernandez	2017–2020	3	12
7	Kevagn Ronco	2017–2020	2	5
8	**Julian Britto**	2021–	1	24
8	**Han Stevens**	2023–	1	18
8	**James Caetano**	2021–	1	22
8	Dylan Peacock	2019–2022	1	15
8	Jamie Serra	2017–2020	1	12
8	Michael Negrette	2017–2020	1	8
8	Jayce Olivero	2017–2020	1	4

=== Goalkeepers ===
#	Player	Career	Games	Wins	GA	GAA
1	Bradley Banda	2017–2020	13	1	50	3.846
2	Jaylan Hankins	2019–2022	13	0	51	3.923
3	**Harry Victor**	2023–	14	0	60	4.286
4	Bradley Avellano	2023–2024	10	0	24	2.4
5	Christian Lopez	2021–2022	2	0	8	4
5	**Thomas Recagno**	2025–	2	0	3	1.5
7	**Victor Huart**	2025–	1	0	1	1
7	Dayle Coleing	2018	1	0	5	5

- **^1** Players in **bold** are still actively competing and are available for selection

== See also ==
- Football in Gibraltar
- Gibraltar Football Association
