= Liam Jessop =

Gibraltarian footballer (born 2005)

Personal information
- Full name: Liam Joseph Jessop
- Date of birth: 13 August 2005 (age 21)
- Place of birth: Gibraltar
- Height: 1.76 m (5 ft 9 in)
- Positions: Forward; winger; right-back

Team information
- Current team: Portadown
- Number: 11

Youth career
- 2011–2012: Glacis United
- 2012–2014: College Europa
- 2014–2019: Atlético Zabal
- 2019–2021: San Roque
- 2021–2023: Fleetwood Town IFA
- 2023–2024: Chesterfield

Senior career*
Years	Team	Apps	(Gls)
2022–2023	FY Academy	13	(12)
2022–2023	→ Anchorsholme (loan)	11	(5)
2023	FCB Magpies	0	(0)
2023–2024	Chesterfield Youth	11	(3)
2023–2026	Chesterfield	2	(0)
2025	→ Worksop Town (loan)	10	(1)
2025–2026	→ Lincoln Red Imps (loan)	8	(1)
2026–	Portadown	3	(0)

International career^{‡}
2019	Gibraltar U15	3	(0)
2021	Gibraltar U17	5	(1)
2022–2023	Gibraltar U19	8	(1)
2021–	Gibraltar U21	9	(0)
2025–	Gibraltar	11	(1)
- * Club domestic league appearances and goals as of 19 September 2026 ‡ National team caps and goals as of 18 November 2026

Liam Joseph Jessop (born 13 August 2005) is a Gibraltarian footballer who plays for NIFL Premiership club Portadown, and the Gibraltar national football team at international level. Initially a winger or forward, Jessop converted to a right-back during his time at Chesterfield.

== Club career ==
Jessop began playing youth football with Glacis United, later moving across the border from Gibraltar to play for Linense's youth team Atlético Zabal before moving to San Roque. In April 2021 it was announced that he would move to England for the first time to join the Fleetwood Town International Football Academy at the end of the year. His performances there led to a loan to Kendal Town being announced, but registration issues caused the move to collapse. He instead joined Anchorsholme on loan in October 2022. Whilst at Fleetwood Town International Football Academy, he also played for FY Academy during the 22/23 season. He would go on to score 12 goals, helping the team win the league.

=== Chesterfield ===
After Anchorsholme folded at the end of the season, Jessop returned to Gibraltar to join FCB Magpies. However, after impressing for Gibraltar U19 in a pre-season friendly against the Chesterfield academy, the Spireites signed him that same summer. He spent his first season playing for their academy side and their youth team in the eleventh tier Central Midlands Alliance, but made his first team debut on 9 December 2023, scoring twice in a 6–1 win over Southport in the FA Trophy. He made his first start a month later in the next round of the competition, as the Spireites fell to a 2–0 defeat to Welling United. He made his league debut on 17 August 2024, in the EFL League Two win against Crewe Alexandra.

==== Loans ====
On 31 January 2025, Jessop joined Northern Premier League Premier Division side Worksop Town on loan for the remainder of the season. He scored once in 10 league games as the Tigers finished 2nd in the league, ultimately securing promotion via the play-offs.

On 3 September 2025, it was announced that Jessop had returned to Gibraltar on a season-long loan at Lincoln Red Imps, where he would play in their UEFA Conference League campaign.

On 22 May 2026, Chesterfield announced the player was being released.

=== Portadown ===
After leaving Chesterfield, Jessop moved to Northern Ireland to sign for Portadown.

== International career ==
Jessop first represented Gibraltar at under-15 level, captaining the side in a 2019 UEFA Development Tournament. In 2021 he stepped up to under-17 level, scoring on his debut in a 2–1 win over the Faroe Islands on 10 September. He made his under-21 debut just 2 months later, making a 3-minute cameo on 12 November 2021 in a 7–0 defeat to Wales. He would become a regular fixture in the team 2 years later during the 2025 UEFA European Under-21 Championship qualification campaign, notably registering assists for Dylan Borge in the 3–1 defeat to Moldova on 15 June 2023 and for Tayler Carrington in the 2–1 victory against the same opponents on 21 November 2023. He made his senior international debut in a 3–1 defeat to Montenegro on 22 March 2025, starting the game and playing 65 minutes.

== Career statistics ==
=== Club ===
As of match played on 19 September 2026

Club statistics
Club	Season	League			National cup		League cup		Continental		Other		Total	
Club	Season	Division	Apps	Goals	Apps	Goals	Apps	Goals	Apps	Goals	Apps	Goals	Apps	Goals
FY Academy	2022–23	Lancashire Sunday Football League	13	12	—		—		—		—		13	12
Anchorsholme (loan)	2022–23	Mid-Lancashire Football League	11	5	—		—		—		2 (Note: Includes Guildhall Cup.)	1	13	6
FCB Magpies	2023–24	Gibraltar Football League	0	0	0	0	—		0	0	0	0	0	0
Chesterfield Youth	2023–24	Central Midlands Alliance	11	3	0	0	2	1	—		4 (Note: Includes Floodlit Cup.)	1	17	5
Chesterfield	2023–24	National League	0	0	0	0	—		—		2 (Note: Includes FA Trophy.)	2	2	2
Chesterfield	2024–25	EFL League Two	2	0	1	0	0	0	—		1 (Note: Includes EFL Trophy.)	0	4	0
Chesterfield	2025–26	EFL League Two	0	0	0	0	0	0	—		0	0	0	0
Chesterfield	Total		2	0	1	0	0	0	—		3	2	6	2
Worksop Town (loan)	2024–25	NPL Premier Division	10	1	0	0	—		—		1 (Note: Includes Sheffield & Hallamshire Senior Cup.)	0	11	1
Lincoln Red Imps (loan)	2025–26	Gibraltar Football League	8	1	1	0	—		0	0	0	0	9	1
Portadown	2026–27	NIFL Premiership	3	0	0	0	0	0	—		1 (Note: Includes Mid-Ulster Cup.)	0	4	0
Career total			58	22	2	0	2	1	0	0	11	4	73	27

=== International ===
As of 16 November 2026

Gibraltar
Year	Apps	Goals
2025	7	1
2026	4	0
Total	11	1

No.	Date	Venue	Opponent	Score	Result	Competition
1	14 November 2025	Europa Sports Park, Gibraltar	Montenegro	1–0	1–2	2026 FIFA World Cup qualification

== Honours ==
Chesterfield Youth

- Abacus Lighting Floodlit Cup: 2023–24

Worksop Town

- Northern Premier League Premier Division Play-Off Winner: 2024–25

Lincoln Red Imps

- Gibraltar Football League: 2025–26
- Rock Cup: 2025–26
