= Tayler Carrington =

Gibraltarian footballer

Personal information
- Full name: Tayler Carrington Barden
- Date of birth: 28 May 2006 (age 20)
- Place of birth: Gibraltar
- Position: Centre-back

Team information
- Current team: Calamocha
- Number: 6

Youth career
- 2014–2017: Unión Manilva
- 2017–2023: Estepona
- 2023–2024: Algeciras
- 2024: Estepona
- 2024–2025: Vázquez Cultural

Senior career*
Years	Team	Apps	(Gls)
2024	Estepona B	1	(0)
2025–2026	Lincoln Red Imps	1	(0)
2026	Mons Calpe	6	(0)
2026–	Calamocha	1	(0)

International career^{‡}
2022	Gibraltar U16	3	(0)
2021–2022	Gibraltar U17	5	(0)
2023–	Gibraltar U21	18	(1)
2025–	Gibraltar	1	(0)
- * Club domestic league appearances and goals as of 13 September 2026 ‡ National team caps and goals as of 6 October 2026

Tayler Carrington Barden (born 28 May 2006) is a Gibraltarian footballer who plays as a defender for Segunda Federación – Group 5 side Calamocha and the Gibraltar national team.

== Club career ==
Initially playing football for local Spanish side Unión Manilva, Carrington spent the majority of his youth career at CD Estepona. In October 2022 he was named in a senior team for the first time, as an unused substitute for Estepona B against Costa Unida. After a brief stint with the Juvenil side of Algeciras in the 2023–24 season, he returned again to Estepona in March 2024 and made is B team debut on 24 April, against CDF Banús. He joined academy side Vázquez Cultural in July 2024 División de Honor, the top division of youth football in Spain. The nex summer, he joined Gibraltar Football League champions Lincoln Red Imps, but after struggling for game time, he moved to Mons Calpe in January 2026. In July 2026, he moved again to Spanish side CF Calamocha.

== International career ==
Carrington made his first international appearance for Gibraltar in 2021, for the Gibraltar national under-17 football team against Switzerland. After first playing for them in an unofficial friendly against Iraq under-20s, he made his under-21 debut on 15 June 2023 against Moldova, forming a defensive partnership with Paddy McClafferty that proved difficult to break down throughout the campaign. He scored his first international goal against the same opposition on 21 November with what proved to be the winner in a famous 2–1 victory in Chișinău. He received his first senior call-up in March 2024 for the 2022–23 UEFA Nations League play-out against Lithuania, but did not play. He made his senior debut on 6 June 2025, coming on as a substitute against Croatia.

== Career statistics ==
As of match played 13 September 2026

Appearances and goals by club, season and competition
Club	Season	League			National Cup		League Cup		Continental		Other		Total	
Club	Season	Division	Apps	Goals	Apps	Goals	Apps	Goals	Apps	Goals	Apps	Goals	Apps	Goals
Estepona B	2023–24	Tercera Andaluza	1	0	—		—		—		—		1	0
Lincoln Red Imps	2025–26	Gibraltar Football League	1	0	0	0	—		0	0	1	0	2	0
Mons Calpe	2025–26	Gibraltar Football League	6	0	1	0	—		—		0	0	7	0
Calamocha	2026–27	Segunda Federación	1	0	0	0	—		—		0	0	1	0
Career total			9	0	1	0	0	0	0	0	1	0	11	0

=== International ===
As of match played 5 October 2026.

Appearances and goals by national team and year
National team	Year	Apps	Goals
Gibraltar U16
Gibraltar U16	2022	3	0
Total		3	0
Gibraltar U17
Gibraltar U17	2021	2	0
Gibraltar U17	2022	3	0
Total		5	0
Gibraltar U21
Gibraltar U21	2023	8	1
Gibraltar U21	2025	6	0
Gibraltar U21	2026	4	0
Total		18	1
Gibraltar
Gibraltar	2025	1	0
total		1	0
