= CF Calamocha =

Association football club in Spain

Calamocha
- Full name: Club de Fútbol Calamocha
- Nicknames: Calamochinos, Jamoneros
- Founded: 1940
- Ground: Polideportivo Jumaya, Calamocha; Aragon, Spain
- Coordinates: 40.916864°N 1.293712°W
- President: (Spain) Mariano Sánchez
- Head coach: (Spain) Sergio Lagunas
- League: Segunda Federación – Group 5
- 2025–26: Tercera Federación – Group 17, 1st of 18 (champions)
Home colours	Away colours

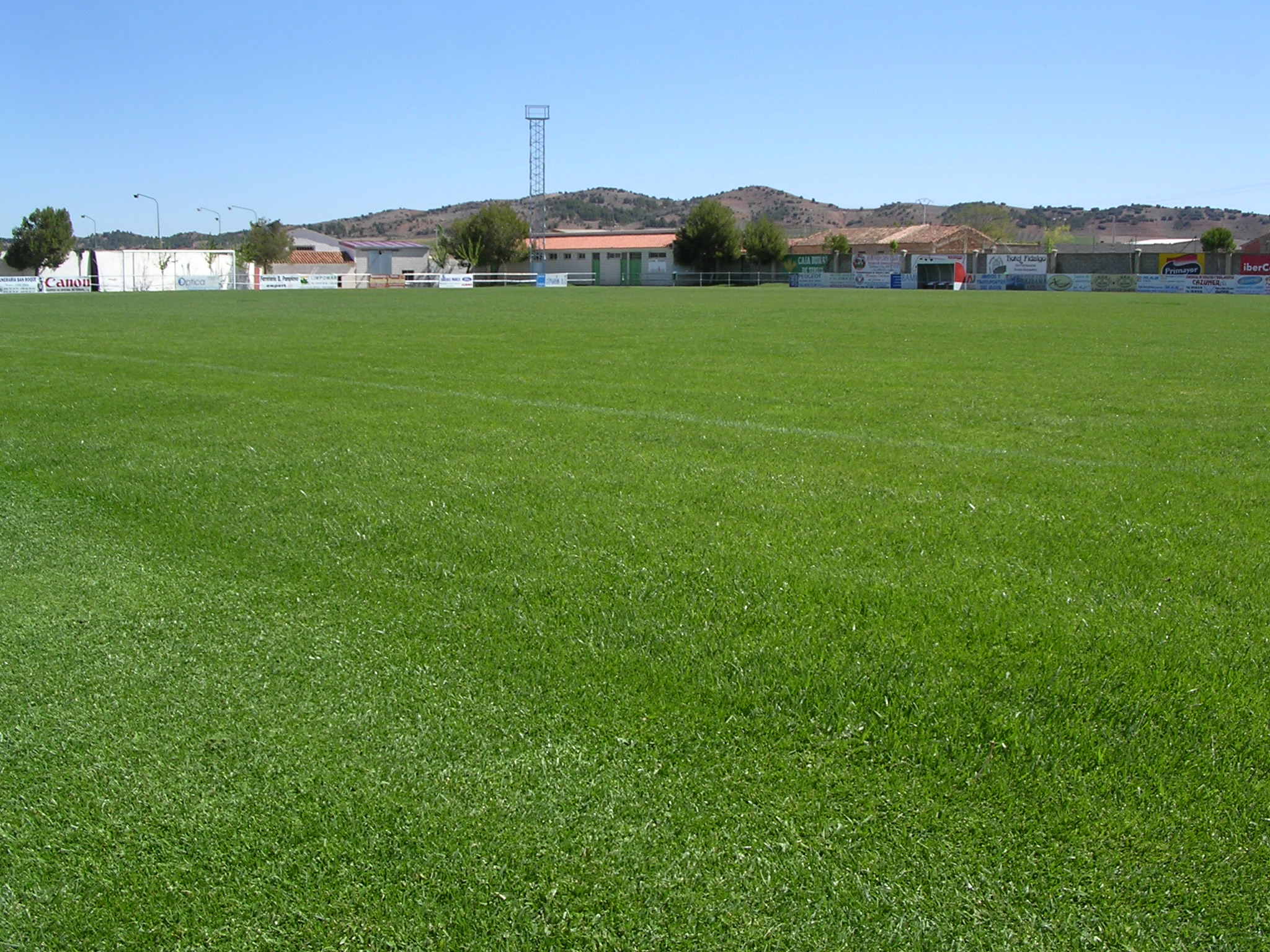
Jumaya stadium

Club de Fútbol Calamocha is a Spanish football team based in Calamocha, in the autonomous community of Aragon. Founded in 1940, it plays in Segunda Federación – Group 5, holding home games at Jumaya.

== History ==
The club was founded in 1940, and has mostly played in the regional categories of Aragon, prominently in the Primera Regional and in recent times the Regional Preferente.

In the 2017–18 season, for the first time in CF Calamocha's history, the club won promotion to the Tercera División of Spanish football after finishing second in the Regional Preferente and competed in the Tercera División, Group 17.

== Season to season ==
Season	Tier	Division	Place	Copa del Rey
1971–72	6	2ª Reg.	2nd	
1972–73	6	2ª Reg. P.	5th	
1973–74	6	2ª Reg. P.	9th	
1974–75	6	2ª Reg. P.	9th	
1975–76	6	2ª Reg. P.	4th	
1976–77	5	1ª Reg.	6th	
1977–78	5	Reg. Pref.	21st	
1978–79	6	1ª Reg.	16th	
1979–80	6	1ª Reg.	11th	
1980–81	6	1ª Reg.	3rd	
1981–82	6	1ª Reg.	10th	
1982–83	6	1ª Reg.	5th	
1983–84	6	1ª Reg.	5th	
1984–85	6	1ª Reg.	2nd	
1985–86	6	1ª Reg.	2nd	
1986–87	6	1ª Reg.	1st	
1987–88	5	Reg. Pref.	5th	
1988–89	5	Reg. Pref.	7th	
1989–90	5	Reg. Pref.	11th	
1990–91	5	Reg. Pref.	10th	

Season	Tier	Division	Place	Copa del Rey
1991–92	5	Reg. Pref.	4th	
1992–93	DNP			
1993–94	DNP			
1994–95	7	2ª Reg.	4th	
1995–96	7	2ª Reg.	1st	
1996–97	6	1ª Reg.	8th	
1997–98	6	1ª Reg.	7th	
1998–99	6	1ª Reg.	8th	
1999–2000	6	1ª Reg.	6th	
2000–01	6	1ª Reg.	13th	
2001–02	6	1ª Reg.	14th	
2002–03	6	1ª Reg.	4th	
2003–04	6	1ª Reg.	4th	
2004–05	6	1ª Reg.	2nd	
2005–06	5	Reg. Pref.	17th	
2006–07	6	1ª Reg.	7th	
2007–08	6	1ª Reg.	8th	
2008–09	6	1ª Reg.	1st	
2009–10	5	Reg. Pref.	6th	
2010–11	5	Reg. Pref.	13th	

Season	Tier	Division	Place	Copa del Rey
2011–12	5	Reg. Pref.	9th	
2012–13	5	Reg. Pref.	11th	
2013–14	5	Reg. Pref.	6th	
2014–15	5	Reg. Pref.	9th	
2015–16	5	Reg. Pref.	9th	
2016–17	5	Reg. Pref.	6th	
2017–18	5	Reg. Pref.	2nd	
2018–19	4	3ª	12th	
2019–20	4	3ª	17th	
2020–21	4	3ª	6th / 6th	
2021–22	5	3ª RFEF	12th	
2022–23	5	3ª Fed.	10th	
2023–24	5	3ª Fed.	8th	
2024–25	5	3ª Fed.	7th	
2025–26	5	3ª Fed.	1st	
2026–27	4	2ª Fed.		TBD

- 1 season in Segunda Federación
- 3 seasons in Tercera División
- 5 seasons in Tercera Federación/Tercera División RFEF

== Current squad ==
As of 6 May 2021

Note: Flags indicate national team as defined under FIFA eligibility rules; some limited exceptions apply. Players may hold more than one non-FIFA nationality.

No.	Pos.	Nation	Player
1	GK	ESP	Unai Calavia
2	DF	ESP	Ramón Ascensio
3	DF	ESP	Álex Escuín
4	DF	ESP	Daniel Solbes
5	MF	ESP	Jorge López
6	DF	GIB	Tayler Carrington
7	FW	ESP	Jorge Álvarez
8	FW	CPV	Nilton Gomes
9	FW	ESP	Fran Rotellar
10	FW	ESP	Iñigo Cortés
11	DF	ESP	Edson Delgado
12	DF	ESP	Carlos Ferruz
13	GK	ESP	Rubén Cebollada

No.	Pos.	Nation	Player
14	DF	ESP	Mario Chorén
15	DF	ESP	Antonio Ginovés
16	MF	ESP	Fernando Casero
17	DF	ESP	Joel Andrés
18	FW	UKR	Oleksandr Ilchenko
19	FW	ESP	Dani Torcal
20	DF	ESP	Roberto Pérez
21	FW	SEN	Oumar Sene
22	MF	ESP	Mario Sorbe
23	MF	ESP	Enrique Navarro
24	FW	EQG	Celesdonio Abeso
25	GK	ESP	Iñaki Serrano
26	FW	ESP	Javi Bellmunt

=== Current staff ===
Position	Staff
Manager	(Spain) Sergio Lagunas
Assistant manager	(Spain) Alonso Dominguez
Delegate	(Spain) Sergio Gimenez
Delegate	(Spain) José María Rovira

Last updated: 5 May 2021

=== Reserve team ===
In 2017 the CF Calamocha B was founded, which play their matches in the Segunda Regional of Aragón.

== Stadium ==
CF Calamocha plays its matches in Jumaya, with natural grass.

== Honours ==
- Categorías Regionales (2): 1986–87, 2008–09
  - Runners-Up (4): 1984–85, 1985–86, 2004–05, 2017–18

== Sources ==
- Carbonell Escriche, José (2021). El Club de Fútbol Calamocha. Historia de una pasión (in Spanish). Sistemas de Impresión y Diseño, Calamocha. DL TE-7-2021.
