= Justin Rovegno =

Gibraltarian footballer (born 1989)

Personal information
- Date of birth: 17 July 1989 (age 37)
- Place of birth: Gibraltar
- Height: 1.83 m (6 ft 0 in)
- Position: Left-back

Senior career*
Years	Team	Apps	(Gls)
20??–2011	Gibraltar United		
2011–2013	Manchester United (Gibraltar) (Note: Pre-UEFA. Gibraltar football stats before 2013 are unknown)		
2013–2014	Manchester 62	5	(0)
2014	St Joseph's	2	(0)
2014–2016	Manchester 62	32	(1)
2016–2017	Lions Gibraltar	6	(0)
2017–2018	Glacis United	0	(0)
2018	Boca Gibraltar	1	(0)

International career
2015	Gibraltar	1	(0)
- * Club domestic league appearances and goals

Justin Rovegno (born 17 July 1989) is a Gibraltarian former footballer who last played as a left-back. He made one appearance for the Gibraltar national team.

== International career ==
Rovegno was first called up to the Gibraltar senior team in May 2015 for matches against Croatia and Germany. He made his international début with Gibraltar on 7 June 2015 in a 4–0 loss against Croatia.

== Career statistics ==
National team	Season	Apps	Goals
Gibraltar	2015	1	0
Total		1	0
