= Paddy McClafferty =

Gibraltarian footballer

Personal information
- Full name: Patrick John McClafferty
- Date of birth: 19 September 2004 (age 22)
- Place of birth: Letterkenny, Ireland
- Height: 5 ft 2 in (1.57 m)
- Positions: Central defender; midfielder

Team information
- Current team: St Joseph's
- Number: 25

Youth career
- –2013: Taraguilla
- 2014–2015: Naranjitos 82
- 2016–2021: San Roque
- 2019: → St Catherine's (loan)
- 2021–2022: Cádiz
- 2022–2023: Algeciras

College career
Years	Team	Apps	(Gls)
2023–2026	Northumbria University		

Senior career*
Years	Team	Apps	(Gls)
2019–2021	San Roque	5	(0)
2023–2024	Newcastle Benfield	5	(0)
2025–2026	Blyth Spartans	26	(2)
2026–	St Joseph's	2	(0)

International career^{‡}
2019	Gibraltar U16	1	(0)
2023–	Gibraltar U21	8	(0)
2025–	Gibraltar	8	(0)
- * Club domestic league appearances and goals as of 7 November 2026 ‡ National team caps and goals as of 18 November 2026

Patrick John "Paddy" McClafferty (born 19 September 2004) is an association footballer who played most recently for Blyth Spartans as a defender. Born in Ireland, he represents the Gibraltar at international level.

== Club career ==
McClafferty primarily spent his youth career playing for numerous youth teams across the border in Spain, notably at CD San Roque where he made his senior debut at 15 years old. In 2019, he spent a short period of time with hometown side St Catherine's while staying with family in Killybegs, playing in the Foyle Cup. Upon moving to the UK to study at Northumbria University, he joined Northern League Division One side Newcastle Benfield, although his spell was cut short by injury. In March 2025, having spent the majority of the season with his university side in the BUCS Football League, he joined Blyth Spartans in the Northern Premier League, making his debut on 8 March against Workington.

In August 2026, he returned to the Iberian coast, joining St Joseph's.

== International career ==
Born in the Irish town of Letterkenny, McClafferty was initially raised in nearby Largy, near Killybegs, before moving to Estepona with his family as a child, then to Gibraltar with his mother at the age of 11 when his parents separated. Subsequently, he was eligible to represent the Republic of Ireland and Gibraltar at international level. Having previously represented Gibraltar at under-16 level, he made his debut for the under-21s on 6 September 2023 against Georgia. However, his campaign was cut short by injury while at Newcastle Benfield. He earned his first senior call-up in March 2025, appearing in Scott Wiseman's initial 31 man squad for their opening 2026 FIFA World Cup qualification matches. He made his debut as an 82nd-minute substitute in a 3–1 defeat to Montenegro on 22 March 2025.
