= Tyson Ruiz =

Gibraltarian footballer (born 1988)

Personal information
- Full name: Tyson Paul Ruiz
- Date of birth: 10 March 1988 (age 38)
- Place of birth: Gibraltar
- Height: 1.70 m (5 ft 7 in)
- Position: Midfielder

Team information
- Current team: Bruno's Magpies
- Number: 88

Senior career*
Years	Team	Apps	(Gls)
20??–2013	St Joseph's		
2013–2015	Lynx	14	(4)
2015–2016	Manchester 62	10	(0)
2016–2017	Mons Calpe	20	(0)
2017–2019	Glacis United	27	(0)
2019	Gibraltar Phoenix	9	(1)
2019–2020	Mons Calpe	7	(0)
2020–	Bruno's Magpies	9	(0)

International career^{‡}
2017–	Gibraltar	1	(0)
- * Club domestic league appearances and goals as of 21:54 23 February 2021 (UTC+1) ‡ National team caps and goals as of 10 October 2017 (UTC+1)

Tyson Paul Ruiz (born 10 March 1988) is a Gibraltarian semi-professional footballer who plays for Bruno's Magpies in the Gibraltar National League as a midfielder.

== Club career ==
After leaving Lynx, Ruiz spent a season at Manchester 62. In a disappointing season for the club, Ruiz played a central role in midfield and was spotted by ambitious newly promoted side Mons Calpe in 2016. However, despite making 20 appearances in the league, he left the club as the MCSC ownership opted to overhaul their squad, joining Glacis United on 18 August 2017. He moved to Gibraltar Phoenix in January 2019, making his debut in a 2–0 defeat to former club Mons Calpe on 7 January 2019. However, in August 2019 he returned to the Calpeans.

== International career ==
On 10 October 2017, he made his debut for the Gibraltar national team.

== Futsal career ==
Ruiz is also an active footballer in Gibraltar's futsal league, playing as a forward for Lynx futsal in their UEFA Futsal League campaigns.
