= Scott Wiseman =

Gibraltarian footballer (born 1985)

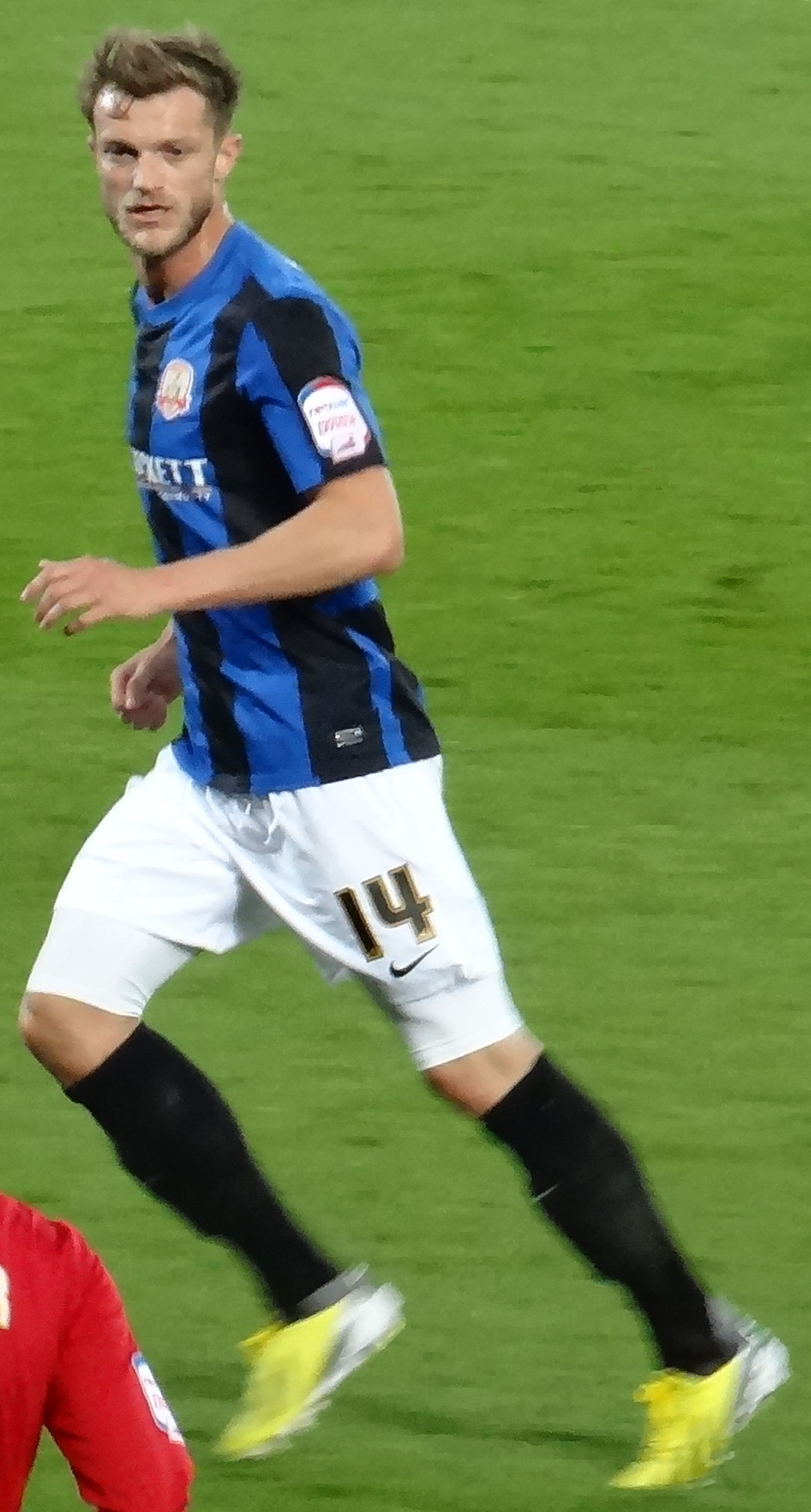
- Wiseman playing for Barnsley in 2013

Personal information
- Full name: Scott Nigel Kenneth Wiseman
- Date of birth: 9 October 1985 (age 41)
- Place of birth: Hull, England
- Height: 6 ft 0 in (1.83 m)
- Position: Defender

Team information
- Current team: Gibraltar (manager)

Youth career
- –2003: Hull City

Senior career*
Years	Team	Apps	(Gls)
2003–2007	Hull City	16	(0)
2005	→ Boston United (loan)	2	(0)
2006–2007	→ Rotherham United (loan)	18	(1)
2007	→ Darlington (loan)	10	(0)
2007–2008	Darlington	9	(0)
2008–2011	Rochdale	105	(1)
2011–2014	Barnsley	102	(1)
2014–2015	Preston North End	37	(2)
2015–2017	Scunthorpe United	48	(2)
2017–2018	Chesterfield	24	(0)
2018	→ Rochdale (loan)	13	(0)
2018–2020	Salford City	71	(4)
2020–2023	Lincoln Red Imps	54	(3)
Total		509	(14)

International career
2005	England U20	3	(0)
2013–2023	Gibraltar	38	(0)

Managerial career
- 2023: Gibraltar U16
- 2023–2025: Gibraltar Women
- 2023–2024: Gibraltar U19 Women
- 2023–2024: Gibraltar U19
- 2024: Gibraltar U17
- 2025–: Gibraltar
- * Club domestic league appearances and goals

Scott Nigel Kenneth Wiseman (born 9 October 1985) is a current football manager and former professional footballer, who played as a defender, usually being deployed as a right-back.

Born in England, Wiseman represented the country at youth level before declaring for the Gibraltar national team, for whom he made 38 appearances over a ten-year period.

Upon his retirement as a player in May 2023, he was appointed Women's Football Development manager for the Gibraltar Football Association. He also currently serves as head coach for both the senior and under-19 women's national teams. In March 2025, he was appointed as head coach of the men's national team, initially as interim coach.

== Club career ==
=== Hull City ===
Born in Hull, Humberside, Wiseman had been involved with his hometown club, Hull City, since the age of six and progressed through the youth teams under Billy Russell. Wiseman made his senior debut for the Tigers in a 1–1 draw against Kidderminster Harriers in the 2003–04 season. Wiseman also made another appearance in the 2003–04 season, in a 3–2 loss against Northampton Town on 10 April 2004.

Wiseman made only four appearances for Hull City in the 2004–05 season and saw him being loaned out to Boston United on 18 February 2005. Wiseman made his Boston United debut the next day, where he made his first start, in a 1–1 draw against Bristol Rovers. He also made another appearance for the club against Northampton Town on 26 February 2005 before returning to his parent club.

He made an increased number of appearances for Hull City in 2005–06, but then spent the first half of the 2006–07 season on loan to Rotherham United. Wiseman made his Rotherham United debut, in the opening game of the season, coming on as a substitute in the second half, in a 1–0 loss against Brighton & Hove Albion. Wiseman scored his first senior goal, in a match against Leyton Orient on 23 September 2006. After making eighteen appearances for the club, where Wiseman was featured in the first team regularly, his loan spell at Rotherham United came to an end in February 2007.

=== Darlington ===
On 9 March 2007, Wiseman joined Darlington on loan until the end of the season. Wiseman made his Darlington debut the next day, making his first start and played 90 minutes, in a 0–0 draw against Rochdale. While on loan at Darlington, Wiseman made ten appearances for them before returning to his parent club, with Manager Dave Penney's chance of keeping him is unlikely.

He joined Darlington permanently on 24 May 2007. However, Wiseman suffered a setback when he suffered an achilles injury that kept him out for the start of the season. After appearing two times as an unused substitute on 2 October 2007 and 6 October 2007, Wiseman, once again, suffered an injury that kept him throughout 2007. After making his return, Wiseman made his Rochdale debut, coming on as a substitute in the second half, on 1 January 2008, in a 1–1 draw against Rochdale. Wiseman appeared both play-off semi-final legs against Rochdale, winning the first game and losing the second a week later. The tie went to penalties which Darlington lost 5–4, where he played the whole leg in both games. After the game, Wiseman was among six players to be released by the club.

=== Rochdale ===
Wiseman signed for Rochdale on a free following his release from Darlington in the summer of 2008, signing a six-month deal.

Wiseman made his Rochdale debut, where he made his first start and played for 75 minutes, in a 0–0 draw against Grimsby Town in the opening game of the season. In a match against Luton Town on 22 November 2008, he set up a goal for Lee Thorpe to score the opener, in a 2–0 win. With seventeen appearances made so far, Wiseman was rewarded with a contract extension, keeping until the end of the season. After missing a game, due to an injury, Wiseman made his return, only to be sent-off, just 31 minutes to the game, in a 4–1 loss against Exeter City on 20 December 2008. Despite suffering an injury as the season came to an end, he finished his first season at the club, making thirty-four appearances in all competition. At the end of the 2008–09 season, Wiseman was released by the club.

However, in the unexpected turn of an event, Wiseman re-joined the club on 9 June 2009 after Simon Ramsden left Rochdale for Bradford City. Following his return, Wiseman continued to established himself in the first team despite suffering injuries. Wiseman scored his first goal for Rochdale on 5 December 2009 against Macclesfield Town, which saw them win 3-0 and for his performance, Wiseman was named Team of the Week, alongside Jason Taylor. As the 2009–10 season progressed, Wiseman made thirty-six appearances and scoring once for the club and helping the club reach promotion to League One next season. For his performance, Wiseman signed a two-year contract with the club.

In the 2010–11 season, Wiseman started the season well, where he helped the club made a good start with eight points and his performance were among singled out by Manager Keith Hill. After a month out, due to a stomach muscle problem, he made his return to the first team on 16 October 2010, in a 2–1 loss against Bristol Rovers. Wiseman then provided an assist and helped the club end their seven games without a win, in a 3–2 win over Tranmere Rovers on 1 January 2011. However, in the next game against Oldham Athletic on 3 January 2011, he received a straight red card, in a 2–1 win. As the 2010–11 season progressed towards the end of the season, Wiseman went on to make forty appearances in all competition.

=== Barnsley ===
On 21 June 2011, Wiseman left Rochdale to join Barnsley for an undisclosed fee, joining alongside his teammate Matt Done and Manager Hill. Upon joining the club, newly Manager Steve Eyre stated he allowed the pair to leave, refusing to intervene into staying at Rochdale.

Wiseman made his Barnsley debut, in the opening game of the season, making his first start as a right-back and played the whole minutes, in a 0–0 draw against Nottingham Forest. Wiseman then scored his first goal for Barnsley, in a 3–2 win against Derby County on 31 January 2012. As the 2011–12 season progressed, Wiseman played out in different position, mostly in the full-back. Wiseman went on to finish his first season at the club, making forty-five appearances and scoring once.

The 2012–13 season saw Wiseman captained his first match following the absence of Jimmy McNulty and played the whole game as captain, as they lost 5–1 against Brighton & Hove Albion on 25 August 2012. Following this, Wiseman captained for most of Barnsley matches for almost throughout 2012 and played a centre-back until he was dropped to the substitute for the match against Burnley on 27 November 2012. Wiseman returned to the squad as captain after spending two weeks as an unused substitute, in a 2–2 draw against Leicester City on 8 December 2012. In the January transfer window, Barnsley accepted a bid from Blackpool for Wiseman. However, the deal fell through. Though he rejected the move, Wiseman has increasingly become very unpopular among Barnsley supporters over his performance. Despite this, Wiseman continued to retain their place following newly appointed manager David Flitcroft used Wiseman as a right wing back due to the £3 million sale of youngster John Stones to Everton. In comparison to his somewhat average performances as a centre half under the Hill regime, Wiseman made the right wing back position his own and became an integral part of the 2013 Reds side that narrowly avoided relegation to League One. At the end of the 2012–13 season, Wiseman finished the season, making forty-one appearances in all competition.

In the 2013–14 season, Wiseman continued to be in a first team regular at the club, mostly in the right-back position. In a 2–1 loss against Leicester City on 28 September 2013, Wiseman had his wrongly goal disallowed following an offside blunder. Wiseman was a fault when he scored an own goal, in a 1–0 loss against Millwall on 25 November 2013. Following the match, Manager Flitcroft was quick to defend Wiseman for his performance against Millwall. Despite being a first team regular at Barnsley in the first half of the season, Wiseman was released by the club.

=== Preston North End ===
Shortly after leaving Barnsley, Wiseman signed for League One side Preston North End, signing an 18-month deal. even though he had offers to stay in The Championship.

The next day, Wiseman made his Preston North End debut, coming on as a substitute in the second half, in a 2–0 loss against Wolverhampton Wanderers. In a match against Tranmere Rovers on 8 February 2014, Wiseman set up one of the Joe Garner's goals, in a 2–1 win. Despite suffering from an injury, Wiseman made fifteen in the second half of the season.

In the 2014–15 season, Wiseman found himself competing with a right-back role with Calum Woods, which resulted him on the substitute in number of matches. Wiseman scored his first goal of the season, in a 4–2 win over Colchester United on 4 October 2014. Wiseman then scored his second goal of the season, in a 1–1 draw against MK Dons on 13 December 2014. Despite suffering from injuries and international commitment, Wiseman helped the club gain promotion to the Championship and scored two times in thirty appearances in all competition. At the end of the 2014–15 season, Wiseman was released by the club following his expiry of his contract.

=== Scunthorpe United ===
After being released by Preston North End, Wiseman joined Scunthorpe United on 28 May 2015 on a two-year deal. Upon joining the club, Wiseman stated joining Scunthorpe United was the one team he would sign for when they were interested in signing him. Additionally, he was given number two shirt to a new season.

Wiseman made his Scunthorpe United debut, in the opening game of the season, in a 2–1 loss against Burton Albion. Wiseman continued to remain in the first team despite being dropped to the substitute in handful of matches, as he competed with a right-back position with Jordan Clarke. Around the same time he's competing for the right-back role, Wiseman played out in different position on two occasions. Wiseman then provided two assists in two league matches against Gillingham and Barnsley between 20 October 2015 and 31 October 2015. However, as the 2015–16 season, Wiseman suffered two injuries before one of them saw him out for the remainder of the season. Wiseman went on to finish the 2015–16 season, making twenty-nine appearances in all competition.

In the 2016–17 season, Wiseman continued to compete with Clark over a right-back position in the first team and made his return to training in the pre-season. Wiseman made his first appearance since returning from injury, coming on as a late substitute, in a 3–1 win against Bristol Rovers in the opening game of the season. Wiseman then provided an assist for Josh Morris, who scored a hat-trick, in a 4–1 win over Walsall on 27 September 2016, followed up by scoring his first goal for the club in the next game and set up a winning goal for Morris, in a 2–1 win over Bury. On 11 May 2017, Wiseman was released by the club.

=== Chesterfield ===
On 19 May 2017, Wiseman joined League Two club Chesterfield on a two-year contract.

=== Salford City ===
Following the end of his contract with Chesterfield, in June 2018 he signed for Salford City on a one-year contract. He made his debut in the opening match of the 2018–19 season on 4 August as Salford drew 1–1 at home to Leyton Orient. At the end of the 2018–19 season he signed a new one-year contract. Wiseman was released from the club on 17 May 2020.

=== Lincoln Red Imps ===
In June 2020, following his release from Salford City, Wiseman moved to Gibraltar to sign for Lincoln Red Imps.

After 3 years at the club, Wiseman announced his retirement from playing on 18 May 2023. The next day, he was appointed Women's Football Development Manager at the GFA, where he had previously served as a Youth Development Officer during his playing career.

== International career ==
=== England national youth teams ===
Wiseman represented England at Under-20 level in the 2005 Toulon Tournament, a competition which saw then Hull City and England Under-21s manager Peter Taylor take charge of the England side.

=== Gibraltar ===
Wiseman was called up by Gibraltar for the first time on 19 November 2013 after it was revealed that he was eligible to play for the team through his mother. Wiseman made his debut for Gibraltar in their first UEFA match on 19 November 2013, a 0–0 draw against Slovakia. This was Gibraltar's first game since being admitted to UEFA.

Wiseman started in Gibraltar's World Cup qualifying match against Greece on the 6 September 2016. He assisted Liam Walker to score Gibraltar's first ever goal in a World Cup Qualifier in the 26th minute and equalize 1–1. However, in the 44th minute Wiseman unfortunately scored an own goal to give Greece the lead back. Greece then followed up with two quickfire goals before halftime and won the match 4–1.

== Coaching career ==
In March 2023 Wiseman put his international playing career on hold to take charge of the Gibraltar national under-16 football team in their upcoming UEFA Development Tournament in Bulgaria. He subsequently became head coach of the women's national team in 2023, as well as the U19 women's team. In 2024 he coached the men's U17 and U19 teams.

In March 2025, he was appointed interim coach of the men's national team after the departure of Julio César Ribas, while remaining in charge of the women's team. He was subsequently kept on as head coach on a deal until March 2026. and left his role as women's team coach in June 2025 at the conclusion of their inaugural UEFA Women's Nations League campaign.

== Personal life ==
While growing up in Hull, East Riding of Yorkshire, Wiseman grew supporting Hull City and was a pupil at Malet Lambert School. Wiseman is married and had a Twitter account before he closed it following abuse from Barnsley supporters he received in January 2013.

== Career statistics ==
=== Club ===
As of match played 19 May 2023

Club	Season	League			National Cup		League Cup		Other		Total	
Club	Season	Division	Apps	Goals	Apps	Goals	Apps	Goals	Apps	Goals	Apps	Goals
Hull City	2003–04	Third Division	2	0	0	0	0	0	0	0	2	0
Hull City	2004–05	League One	3	0	1	0	0	0	1 (Note: Appearances in the Football League Trophy)	0	5	0
Hull City	2005–06	Championship	11	0	0	0	1	0	—		12	0
Hull City	Hull City total		16	0	1	0	1	0	1	0	19	0
Boston United (loan)	2004–05	League Two	2	0	0	0	0	0	0	0	2	0
Rotherham United (loan)	2006–07	League One	18	1	0	0	2	0	1	0	21	1
Darlington (loan)	2006–07	League Two	10	0	0	0	0	0	0	0	10	0
Darlington	2007–08	League Two	9	0	1	0	0	0	0	0	10	0
Rochdale	2008–09	League Two	32	0	2	0	0	0	2	0	36	0
Rochdale	2009–10	League Two	36	1	0	0	0	0	1	0	37	1
Rochdale	2010–11	League One	37	0	1	0	2	0	1	0	41	0
Rochdale	Rochdale total		105	1	3	0	2	0	4	0	114	1
Barnsley	2011–12	Championship	43	1	1	0	1	0	—		45	1
Barnsley	2012–13	Championship	36	0	3	0	2	0	—		41	0
Barnsley	2013–14	Championship	23	0	0	0	2	0	—		25	0
Barnsley	Barnsley total		102	1	4	0	5	0	—		111	1
Preston North End	2013–14	League One	15	0	2	0	0	0	1 (Note: Appearance in the League One play-offs)	0	18	0
Preston North End	2014–15	League One	22	2	4	0	1	0	3	0	30	2
Preston North End	Preston North End total		37	2	6	0	1	0	4	0	48	2
Scunthorpe United	2015–16	League One	24	0	3	0	1	0	1	0	29	0
Scunthorpe United	2016–17	League One	24	2	1	0	0	0	1	0	26	2
Scunthorpe United	Scunthorpe United total		48	2	4	0	1	0	2	0	55	2
Chesterfield	2017–18	League Two	24	0	1	0	1	0	3	0	29	0
Rochdale (loan)	2017–18	League One	13	0	0	0	0	0	0	0	13	0
Salford City	2018–19	National League	46	1	3	0	0	0	2 (Note: Appearances in the National League playoffs)	0	51	1
Salford City	2019–20	League Two	25	3	0	1	0	0	5	0	31	3
Salford City	Salford City total		71	4	3	1	0	0	7	0	82	4
Lincoln Red Imps	2020–21	National League	20	1	4	0	—		3 (Note: Appearances in the Europa League playoffs)	0	27	1
Lincoln Red Imps	2021–22	National League	20	1	5	0	—		12	0	37	1
Lincoln Red Imps	2022-23	National League	14	1	5	0	-		4	1	23	2
Lincoln Red Imps	Lincoln Red Imps Total		54	3	14	0	—		19	1	87	4
Career total			509	14	37	0	13	0	41	1	600	15

== Managerial statistics ==
As of match played 16 November 2026

Includes accredited UEFA fixture(s) only:

Team	From	To	Record						
Team	From	To	G	W	D	L	GF	GA	Win %
Gibraltar U16	March 2023	March 2023	3	1	1	1	2	2	33.33
Gibraltar Women	June 2023	June 2025	11	0	1	10	6	49	0.00
Gibraltar U19 Women	October 2023	April 2024	5	0	0	5	0	48	0.00
Gibraltar U19	December 2023	October 2024	3	0	0	3	1	13	0.00
Gibraltar U17	September 2024	October 2024	3	0	0	3	0	18	0.00
Gibraltar	March 2025	Present	20	3	4	13	15	38	15.00
Total			45	4	6	35	24	169	8.89

== Honours ==
Salford City

- National League play-offs: 2019

Lincoln Red Imps

- Gibraltar Football League: 2020–21, 2021–22, 2022–23
- Rock Cup: 2021, 2021–22
