= CD San Roque =

Spanish football team

- Full name: Club Deportivo San Roque
- Founded: 1966
- Ground: Manolo Mesa, San Roque, Spain
- Capacity: 500
- President: Abel García Núñez
- Head coach: Mariano Marcos García
- League: Segunda Andaluza Cádiz
- 2024–25: Segunda Andaluza Cádiz, 9th of 16
Home colours	Away colours

Club Deportivo San Roque is a Spanish football team based in San Roque, Cádiz, in the autonomous community of Andalusia. Founded in 1966, it plays in Segunda Andaluza Cádiz, holding home matches at Estadio Manolo Mesa, with a 500-seat capacity.

== Season to season ==
Season	Tier	Division	Place	Copa del Rey
1966–67	5	2ª Reg.		
1967–68	5	2ª Reg.		
1968–69	4	1ª Reg.	16th	
1969–70	5	2ª Reg.	9th	
1970–71	5	2ª Reg.	10th	
1971–72	5	2ª Reg.	11th	
1972–73	5	2ª Reg.	10th	
1973–74	5	2ª Reg.	5th	
1974–75	5	2ª Reg.	3rd	
1975–76	6	2ª Reg.	8th	
1976–77	6	2ª Reg.		
1977–78	7	2ª Reg.	3rd	
1978–79	7	2ª Reg.	9th	
1979–80	6	1ª Reg.	15th	
1980–81	6	1ª Reg.	20th	
1981–82	7	2ª Reg.	8th	
1982–83	7	2ª Reg.	2nd	
1983–84	7	2ª Reg.	2nd	
1984–85	6	1ª Reg.	12th	
1985–86	6	1ª Reg.	14th	

Season	Tier	Division	Place	Copa del Rey
1986–87	6	1ª Reg.		
1987–88	6	1ª Reg.	15th	
1988–89	6	1ª Reg.	14th	
1989–90	6	1ª Reg.	3rd	
1990–91	6	1ª Reg.	6th	
1991–92	6	1ª Reg.	3rd	
1992–93	6	1ª Reg.	4th	
1993–94	6	1ª Reg.	5th	
1994–95	6	1ª Reg.	1st	
1995–96	5	Reg. Pref.	12th	
1996–97	5	Reg. Pref.	3rd	
1997–98	5	Reg. Pref.	13th	
1998–99	5	Reg. Pref.	14th	
1999–2000	5	Reg. Pref.	14th	
2000–01	5	Reg. Pref.	13th	
2001–02	5	Reg. Pref.	6th	
2002–03	5	Reg. Pref.	12th	
2003–04	5	Reg. Pref.	11th	
2004–05	6	Reg. Pref.	13th	
2005–06	7	1ª Reg.	8th	

Season	Tier	Division	Place	Copa del Rey
2006–07	7	1ª Reg.	3rd	
2007–08	6	Reg. Pref.	8th	
2008–09	6	Reg. Pref.	3rd	
2009–10	5	1ª And.	13th	
2010–11	5	1ª And.	1st	
2011–12	4	3ª	14th	
2012–13	4	3ª	8th	
2013–14	4	3ª	14th	
2014–15	4	3ª	12th	
2015–16	4	3ª	14th	
2016–17	4	3ª	20th	
2017–18	5	Div. Hon.	8th	
2018–19	5	Div. Hon.	13th	
2019–20	5	Div. Hon.	8th	
2020–21	5	Div. Hon.	10th	
2021–22	7	1ª And.	7th	
2022–23	8	2ª And.	5th	
2023–24	7	1ª And.	16th	
2024–25	8	2ª And.	9th	
2025–26	8	2ª And.		

- 6 seasons in Tercera División
