= Gibraltar national under-19 football team =

National association football team

Gibraltar Under 19
- Association: Gibraltar Football Association
- Confederation: UEFA (Europe)
- Head coach: Ishmael Kofi Antwi
- Captain: Theo Montovio
- Most caps: Rafi Emrani (12)
- Top scorer: Julian Del Rio (4)
- FIFA code: GIB
First colours	Second colours

First international
- Croatia 7–0 Gibraltar (Ostrava, Czech Republic; 17 October 2013)

Biggest win
- Gibraltar 3–1 San Marino (Gibraltar; 28 August 2022)

Biggest defeat
- Gibraltar 1–16 Switzerland (Straßwalchen, Austria; 19 November 2019)

The Gibraltar national under-19 football team represents Gibraltar in football competitions at under-19 level and is controlled by the Gibraltar Football Association. It is a full member of FIFA and is therefore eligible to enter any FIFA-sanctioned tournaments. Gibraltar applied for full UEFA membership and was accepted by the UEFA Congress in May 2013 and can therefore compete in the UEFA European Under-19 Championship beginning with the 2014 edition of the tournament.

== UEFA Acceptance ==
Since being accepted into UEFA in May 2013, they have played three competitive matches for the qualifying round of the 2014 UEFA European Under-19 Championship. They were drawn into Group 1 with Czech Republic, Cyprus and Croatia. Czech Republic were the hosts of the group and all three games were played in the Městský stadion in Ostrava.

They played their first competitive match on 17 October 2013 against Croatia which ended in a thumping 7-0 victory for the Croats. Two days later they played the Czech Republic which resulted in a 3-0 defeat for the Gibraltarians before being thumped 7-0 yet again although this time by Cyprus. The team went 3 years without scoring a goal from 2016, until 2019 when they played in an under-19 tournament hosted by Chinese Taipei. In the first game on 28 September 2019, a Julian Del Rio hat-trick saw Gibraltar under-19s achieve their first ever victory, against Hong Kong.

== Recent results and fixtures ==
=== 2025 ===
12 November 2025 2026 UEFA U-19 Qualification	Serbia	4–0	Gibraltar	Lučko, Croatia
13:45	Borovina 9', 38'; Djorđević I 29'; Damjanović 74'	Report		Stadium: Stadion Lučko; Attendance: 50; Referee: Jacob Karlsen (Denmark)

15 November 2025 2026 UEFA U-19 Qualification	Croatia	8–0	Gibraltar	Karlovac, Croatia
11:30	Vrzić 14', 77', 87'; Chelfi 25', 80'; Durdov 35'; Šimić 45+4'; Aščić 88'	Report		Stadium: Stadion Branko Čavlović-Čavlek; Referee: Florian Badstübner (Germany)

18 November 2025 2026 UEFA U-19 Qualification	Gibraltar	0–1	Georgia	Lučko, Croatia
11:30		Report	Doltmourziev 53'	Stadium: Stadion Lučko; Referee: Jacob Karlsen (Denmark)

=== 2026 ===
24 March 2026 2027 UEFA U-19 Qualification Round 1	Turkey	7–0	Gibraltar	Manavgat, Turkey
14:00	Karadeniz 33', 40'; Karademir 53'; Akdoğan 55' (pen.), 80'; Demir 77'; Eligüzel 88'	Report		Stadium: Arslan Zeki Demirci Sports Complex; Referee: Matteo Marchetti (Italy)

27 March 2026 2027 UEFA U-19 Qualification Round 1	Kosovo	7–0	Gibraltar	Manavgat, Turkey
11:00	R. Ahmeti 20'; D. Ahmeti 19'; Mehmeti 28', 44'; Gashi 63'; Uka 79'	Report		Stadium: Arslan Zeki Demirci Sports Complex; Referee: Szabolcs Kovacs (Romania)

30 March 2026 2027 UEFA U-19 Qualification Round 1	Gibraltar	0–9	Armenia	Manavgat, Turkey
15:00		Report	Davtyan 4'; Asiryan 12'; Batoian 23'; Ambartsumov 34'; Ashikian 45+2', 61'; Hohvannisyan 79'; Gareginyan 83' (pen.); Movsisyan 90'	Stadium: Arslan Zeki Demirci Sports Complex; Referee: Matthew MacDermid (Scotland)

11 November 2026 2027 UEFA U-19 Qualification Round 2	Bulgaria	6–0	Gibraltar	Stara Zagora, Bulgaria
15:00	Gogev 10', 18', 36'; Tunchev 25'; Manolev 63'; Goryanov 79'	Report		Stadium: Stadion Beroe; Referee: Ryan Lee (Scotland)

14 November 2026 2027 UEFA U-19 Qualification Round 2	Moldova	5–0	Gibraltar	Sliven, Bulgaria
13:30	Gusan 3', 19'; Montovio 42' (o.g.); Jeju 59'; Josan 81'	Report		Stadium: Stadion Hadzhi Dimitar; Referee: Antoine Chiaramonti (Andorra)

17 November 2026 2027 UEFA U-19 Qualification Round 2	Gibraltar	1–12	Latvia	Sliven, Bulgaria
13:30	Murien 48'	Report	Doroņins 13', 27', 50', 78'; Ščerbinskis 25', 88'; Šmaukstelis 40'; Lākutis 45'; Bombāns 53', 55'; Rekmanis 70'; Dzenītis 89'	Stadium: Stadion Hadzhi Dimitar; Referee: Ryan Lee (Scotland)

== Players ==
=== Current squad ===
For the 2027 UEFA European Under-19 Championship cycle, players born on or after 1 January 2008 are eligible. Players in bold have caps for the under-21 side or higher.

The following players were called up for the following qualification matches:

- Match date: 11, 14 and 17 November 2026
- Opposition: Bulgaria, Moldova and Latvia
- Caps and goals correct as of: 17 November 2026, after the game against Latvia.

No.	Pos.	Player	Date of birth (age)	Caps	Goals	Club
1	GK	**Victor Huart**	5 September 2008 (age 18)	6	0	(The Football Association) Chesterfield
13	GK	Marco Ribeiro Lane	30 July 2011 (age 15)	0	0	(Gibraltar Football Association) Mons Calpe
4	DF	Daniel Martinez	3 January 2009 (age 17)	6	0	(Gibraltar Football Association) Lincoln Red Imps
5	DF	Niall Garratt	14 January 2009 (age 17)	6	0	(Gibraltar Football Association) Europa
2	DF	Gianni Peliza	23 April 2008 (age 18)	5	0	(Gibraltar Football Association) Mons Calpe
18	DF	Stefan Soleci	29 July 2009 (age 17)	5	0	(Gibraltar Football Association) Europa
3	DF	Julian Pecino	23 January 2009 (age 17)	4	0	(Gibraltar Football Association) Europa
16	DF	Archie Schofield	4 May 2010 (age 16)	2	0	(The Football Association) Club Doncaster
14	DF	Christian Perera Vinent	17 February 2009 (age 17)	1	0	(Gibraltar Football Association) Europa
7	MF	Shaun Murien	9 September 2008 (age 18)	8	1	(Gibraltar Football Association) Lincoln Red Imps
6	MF	**Max Bautista**	7 May 2008 (age 18)	5	0	(Gibraltar Football Association) Europa Point
12	MF	Max Purdy	6 December 2008 (age 17)	4	0	(Gibraltar Football Association) Europa
11	MF	**Owen McMahon**	25 June 2008 (age 18)	3	0	(Gibraltar Football Association) Lincoln Red Imps
20	MF	Thomas Phillips	15 April 2009 (age 17)	3	0	(The Football Association) Bradfield College
19	MF	Aaron Sanchez Soiza	22 January 2009 (age 17)	2	0	(Gibraltar Football Association) Europa
9	FW	Jonathan Rowbottom	1 February 2009 (age 17)	9	0	(Gibraltar Football Association) Lincoln Red Imps
10	FW	Theo Montovio (captain)	29 June 2008 (age 18)	7	0	(Gibraltar Football Association) Lincoln Red Imps
8	FW	James Pincho Ríos	1 January 2011 (age 15)	3	0	(Royal Spanish Football Federation) Algeciras
15	FW	Jaxsen Ramirez Alman	3 January 2010 (age 16)	2	0	(Gibraltar Football Association) Europa
17	FW	Adam Aboudi Achbay	1 November 2008 (age 18)	2	0	(Gibraltar Football Association) Europa

=== Recent call-ups ===
The following players have been called up within the past twelve months or withdrew from the current squad due to injury or suspension, and remain eligible.

Pos.	Player	Date of birth (age)	Caps	Goals	Club	Latest call-up
GK	Ethan Bonfante	12 August 2009 (age 17)	0	0	(Gibraltar) Europa	v. Armenia, 30 March 2026
DF	Nooran Tizniti	25 October 2008 (age 18)	1	0	Free Agent	v. Armenia, 30 March 2026
DF	**Owen Fortunato**	27 October 2008 (age 18)	2	0	(England) Chesterfield	v. Turkey, 24 March 2026^{U21}
DF	**Jayvan Garro**	1 June 2008 (age 18)	4	0	(Gibraltar) Mons Calpe	v. Georgia, 18 November 2025
DF	Kevan Buckley	7 April 2008 (age 18)	3	0	(Gibraltar) Lincoln Red Imps	v. Georgia, 18 November 2025
MF	Luke Schofield	24 July 2008 (age 18)	5	0	(England) Huddersfield Town	v. Armenia, 30 March 2026
MF	Kacey Myers	18 June 2009 (age 17)	3	0	(England) Derby County	v. Armenia, 30 March 2026
MF	Craig Smith	4 January 2009 (age 17)	3	0	(Gibraltar) Europa	v. Armenia, 30 March 2026
MF	Matthew Asquez	8 February 2008 (age 18)	2	0	(Gibraltar) St Joseph's	v. Armenia, 30 March 2026
MF	Lyndon Turrell	13 October 2009 (age 17)	3	0	(England) Leicester City	v. Georgia, 18 November 2025
FW	Tyrese Eyoh	22 August 2009 (age 17)	3	0	Free Agent	v. Armenia, 30 March 2026
FW	Anthony Avellano	4 April 2008 (age 18)	2	0	Free Agent	v. Serbia, 12 November 2025^{INJ}
^{INJ} Withdrew from the squad due to an injury^{PRE} Preliminary squad^{WD} Withdrew for other reasons

== Managerial history ==
- (Gibraltar) Terrence Jolley (2013–2016)
- (Gibraltar) Jansen Moreno (2016–2017)
- (Gibraltar) Stephen Head (2017–2018)
- (Gibraltar) Steve Cummings (2018–2020)
- (Gibraltar) Malcolm Martin (2020–2023)
- (Gibraltar) Scott Wiseman (2023–2024)
- (Wales) Ash Taylor (2025–2026)
- (Ghana) Ishmael Kofi Antwi (2026–)

== Top goalscorers ==
As of 17 November 2026

Players with an equal number of goals are ranked in order of average.

#	Name	Career	Goals	Caps	Average
1	Julian Del Rio	2019	4	6	0.667
2	Rafi Emrani	2021–2023	3	12	0.3
3	Craig Galliano	2019	1	3	0.333
3	Anthony Hernandez	2013	1	4	0.25
3	Kian Ronan	2017–2019	1	5	0.2
3	Leon Clinton	2015–2016	1	6	0.167
3	Jayce Consigliero	2014–2015	1	6	0.167
3	Jamie Coombes	2013–2014	1	6	0.167
3	Lee Chipolina	2023–2024	1	7	0.143
3	Francis Huart	2021–2022	1	7	0.143
3	Scott Ballantine	2013–2014	1	7	0.143
3	Shaun Murien	2025–2026	1	8	0.125
3	Liam Jessop	2022–2023	1	8	0.125
3	Kevan Gonzalez	2022–2023	1	9	0.111

== See also ==
- Football in Gibraltar
- Gibraltar Football Association
