= Gibraltar national under-17 football team =

National youth association football team

Gibraltar Under-17
- Association: Gibraltar Football Association
- Confederation: UEFA (Europe)
- Head coach: Ryan Casciaro
- Captain: Niall Garratt
- Most caps: Andrew Hernandez, Jaiden Bartolo (9)
- Top scorer: Jaiden Bartolo (6)
- Home stadium: Victoria Stadium
- FIFA code: GIB
First colours	Second colours

First international
- Republic of Ireland 4–1 Gibraltar (Yerevan, Armenia; 24 October 2013)

Biggest win
- Gibraltar 8–2 Liechtenstein (Gibraltar; 25 August 2022)

Biggest defeat
- Czech Republic 13–0 Gibraltar (Strumica, North Macedonia; 8 October 2025)

European Championship
- Appearances: None

FIFA U-17 World Cup
- Appearances: None

The Gibraltar national under-17 football team is the youth football team of Gibraltar, run by the Gibraltar Football Association. The team is based mostly on the young players from the region's domestic leagues, the Gibraltar Premier Division and Gibraltar Second Division, and competes every year to qualify for the European Under-17 Football Championship.

== History ==
The team played its first match on 24 October 2013 against the Republic of Ireland national under-17 football team, the year when Gibraltar became a member of UEFA. George Wink, then of the Juvenil team of the Spanish club Club Atlético Zabal, scored the first goal, in the history of the national under-17 team on October 28, 2013 against the Armenia national under-17 football team.

The side would finish bottom of the group on every campaign since, scoring only 5 goals in response, with George Wink becoming the record goalscorer at any level of football in Gibraltar until Jake Gosling and Lee Casciaro equalled the record for the seniors in 2015. In May 2017, a re-organization of management throughout the Gibraltar Football Association saw coach Stephen Head step up to manage the U19 team, with David Ochello appointed as his replacement. The following campaign saw Gibraltar suffer a record 10-0 defeat to Norway on the 4th anniversary of their debut in the competition.

8 years after their first matches as UEFA members, Gibraltar finally secured their first win at under-17 level with a 2-1 friendly win over Faroe Islands on 10 September 2021. In October 2023, Gibraltar initially withdrew from qualification for the 2024 UEFA European Under-17 Championship, citing safety concerns as a result of the Gaza war. The whole group, set to be hosted in Israel, was postponed by UEFA later that day. New dates were later announced for November 2023 with Wales hosting instead.

== Match record ==
=== FIFA World Cup ===
FIFA World Cup record										Qualification record					
Era	Year	Round	Pos	Pld	W	D	L	GF	GA	Pld	W	D	L	GF	GA
Under-16	1985 to 1989	Not a FIFA member								Not a FIFA member					
Under-17	1991 to 2015	Not a FIFA member								Not a FIFA member					
Under-17	(India) 2017	Ineligible								—					
Under-17	(Brazil) 2019	Did Not Qualify								3	0	0	3	0	27
Under-17	(Peru) 2021	Cancelled								—					
Under-17	(Indonesia) 2023	Did Not Qualify								2	0	0	2	0	14
Under-17	(Qatar) 2025	Did Not Qualify								3	0	0	3	0	19
Under-17	(Qatar) 2026	Did Not Qualify								3	0	0	3	0	30
Under-17	(Qatar) 2027	Future Event								Future Event					
Under-17	(Qatar) 2028	Future Event								Future Event					
Under-17	(Qatar) 2029	Future Event								Future Event					
Total		—	0/24	0	0	0	0	0	0	11	0	0	11	0	90

=== UEFA European Championship ===
UEFA European Championship record										Qualification record					
Era	Year	Round	Pos	Pld	W	D	L	GF	GA	Pld	W	D	L	GF	GA
Under-16	1982 to 2001	Not a UEFA member								Not a UEFA member					
Under-17	2002 to 2013	Not a UEFA member								Not a UEFA member					
Under-17	(Malta) 2014	did not qualify								3	0	0	3	2	14
Under-17	(Bulgaria) 2015	did not qualify								3	0	1	2	0	9
Under-17	(Azerbaijan) 2016	did not qualify								3	0	0	3	2	16
Under-17	(Croatia) 2017	did not qualify								3	0	0	3	1	7
Under-17	(England) 2018	did not qualify								3	0	0	3	0	23
Under-17	(Republic of Ireland) 2019	did not qualify								3	0	0	3	0	27
Under-17	(Estonia) 2020	Cancelled								3	0	0	3	1	20
Under-17	(Cyprus) 2021	Cancelled								—					
Under-17	(Israel) 2022	did not qualify								3	0	0	3	1	17
Under-17	(Hungary) 2023	did not qualify								2	0	0	2	0	14
Under-17	(Cyprus) 2024	did not qualify								2	0	0	2	0	8
Under-17	(Albania) 2025	did not qualify								3	0	0	3	0	19
Under-17	(Estonia) 2026	did not qualify								3	0	0	3	0	30
Under-17	(Latvia) 2027	Future event								0	0	0	0	0	0
Total		—	0/41	0	0	0	0	0	0	34	0	1	33	7	204

== Recent results and fixtures ==
=== 2026 ===
23 April 2026 2026 UEFA U-17 Qualification Round 2	Finland	3–0	Gibraltar	Vadul lui Vodă, Moldova
10:00	Meltoranta 74'; Barret 85'; Mäkeläinen 90+1'	Report		Stadium: Stadionul CPSM; Referee: Robin Hensgens (The Netherlands)

26 April 2026 2026 UEFA U-17 Qualification Round 2	Bosnia and Herzegovina	4–0	Gibraltar	Vadul lui Vodă, Moldova
10:00	Milijević 20'; Perera Vinent 24' (o.g.); Korora 31'; Đerić 39'	Report		Stadium: Stadionul CPSM; Referee: Andreu Simarro (Andorra)

29 April 2026 2026 UEFA U-17 Qualification Round 2	Gibraltar	0–7	Moldova	Chișinău, Moldova
12:00		Report	Ciuchin 14'; Ceaciru 16', 37', 48', 90+7'; Rosioru 41'; Turetchi 68'	Stadium: Zimbru Stadium; Referee: Andreu Simarro (Andorra)

23 September 2026 2027 UEFA U-17 Qualification Round 1	Iceland	4–0	Gibraltar	Zenica, Bosnia-Herzegovina
14:00	Þorfinnsson 25'; Brynjarsson 32'; Ottesen 38'; Cordon 90' (o.g.)	Report		Stadium: FF BH Football Training Centre; Referee: Gal Levi (Israel)

26 September 2026 2027 UEFA U-17 Qualification Round 1	Greece	4–2	Gibraltar	Kakanj, Bosnia-Herzegovina
14:00	Veridiano 21'; Tentolouris 24'; Hinz 50' (pen.); Kakalis 78'	Report	Hill De Oliveira 38'; Payas 56'	Stadium: Mladost Stadium; Referee: Dalibor Černý (Czech Republic)

29 September 2026 2027 UEFA U-17 Qualification Round 1	Gibraltar	1–9	Bosnia and Herzegovina	Zenica, Bosnia-Herzegovina
14:00	Sanchez 62'	Report	Milijević 16'; Mušanović 26', 56'; Trivunović 34'; Leto 58'; Bujak 65'; Huremović 75'; Bajić 79', 86'	Stadium: FF BH Football Training Centre; Referee: Gal Levi (Israel)

== Squad ==
=== Current squad ===
For the 2027 UEFA European Under-17 Championship qualification and finals, players born on or after 1 January 2010 are eligible. Players in bold have been capped at a higher age group.

The following players were called up for the following 2026 UEFA European Under-17 Championship qualification matches:

- Match date: 23, 26 and 29 September 2026
- Opposition: Iceland, Greece and Bosnia
- Caps and goals correct as of: 29 September 2026, after the match against Bosnia.

No.	Pos.	Player	Date of birth (age)	Caps	Goals	Club
1	GK	Matthew Avellano	11 August 2010 (age 16)	2	0	(Gibraltar Football Association) FC Magpies
13	GK	Lucas Becerra Lopez	12 December 2010 (age 15)	3	0	(Gibraltar Football Association) Lincoln Red Imps
3	DF	Leon Martinez	23 February 2010 (age 16)	6	0	(Gibraltar Football Association) Lincoln Red Imps
8	DF	Kaion Drakes	24 May 2010 (age 16)	3	0	(Gibraltar Football Association) Lincoln Red Imps
12	DF	Filipe Hill de Oliveira	19 February 2010 (age 16)	4	0	(Gibraltar Football Association) Lincoln Red Imps
2	DF	Matthew Sanchez	2 February 2010 (age 16)	3	1	(Gibraltar Football Association) Lincoln Red Imps
4	DF	Julian Lima	7 February 2010 (age 16)	3	0	(Gibraltar Football Association) Lincoln Red Imps
6	DF	Aaron Cordon	2 May 2011 (age 15)	3	0	(Gibraltar Football Association) Lincoln Red Imps
18	DF	Jayron Birkett Hernandez	20 October 2010 (age 16)	3	0	(Gibraltar Football Association) St Joseph's
14	DF	Aiden Desoiza Attard	13 December 2010 (age 15)	2	0	(Gibraltar Football Association) Lincoln Red Imps
20	DF	Edward Purdy	7 April 2011 (age 15)	2	0	(Gibraltar Football Association) FC Magpies
10	MF	Liam Payas	17 June 2010 (age 16)	3	1	(Gibraltar Football Association) Lincoln Red Imps
5	MF	Ryan Casciaro, Jr (captain)	4 May 2010 (age 16)	3	0	(Gibraltar Football Association) Lincoln Red Imps
11	MF	Robert Guiling, Jr	1 March 2010 (age 16)	3	0	(Gibraltar Football Association) Lincoln Red Imps
15	MF	Imran El Hana	21 August 2010 (age 16)	3	0	(Royal Spanish Football Federation) Recreativo
7	MF	Josua Villa Lopes	17 April 2010 (age 16)	1	0	(Royal Spanish Football Federation) Los Cortijillos
19	FW	Jaxsen Ramirez Alman	3 January 2010 (age 16)	8	0	(Gibraltar Football Association) Europa
16	FW	Evan Garro	13 December 2010 (age 15)	4	0	(Gibraltar Football Association) Lincoln Red Imps
17	FW	Lucas Hill de Oliveira	19 February 2010 (age 16)	3	1	(Gibraltar Football Association) Lincoln Red Imps
9	FW	Ilies Achhoud	11 February 2010 (age 16)	2	0	(Gibraltar Football Association) Lincoln Red Imps

=== Recent call-ups ===
The following players have been called up within the past twelve months or withdrew from the current squad due to injury or suspension, and remain eligible.

Pos.	Player	Date of birth (age)	Caps	Goals	Club	Latest call-up
GK	Marco Ribero Lane	30 July 2011 (age 15)	2	0	(Gibraltar) Mons Calpe	v. Moldova, 29 April 2026
DF	Sacha Fortunato	20 July 2010 (age 16)	2	0	(Gibraltar) Europa	v. Moldova, 29 April 2026
FW	James Pincho Ríos	1 January 2011 (age 15)	3	0	(Spain) Algeciras	v. Moldova, 29 April 2026
FW	Jace Ramirez	23 May 2010 (age 16)	1	0	(Gibraltar) Europa	v. North Macedonia, 15 October 2025
^{INJ} Withdrew from the squad due to an injury^{PRE} Preliminary squad^{WD} Withdrew for other reasons

== Managerial history ==
- (Gibraltar) Stephen Head (2013–2014, 2016–2017)
- (Gibraltar) David Ochello (2014–2016, 2017–2018)
- (England) Jeff Wood (2018)
- (England) Steven Cummings (2018–2019)
- (Gibraltar) Jonathan Sodi (2019–2020)
- (Gibraltar) Jansen Moreno (2021–2024)
- (Gibraltar) Scott Wiseman (2024)
- (Spain) Victor Manuel Gonzalez (2025)
- (England) George Forrest (2026)
- (Gibraltar) Ryan Casciaro (2026–)

== Top Goalscorers ==
As of 4 November 2022

Players with an equal number of goals are ranked in order of average.

#	Name	Career	Goals	Caps	Average
1	Jaiden Bartolo	2021–2022	6	9	0.667
2	James Scanlon	2022	3	4	0.75
3	Sebastian Diaz	2022	2	3	0.667
3	Angel Gonzalez	2021	2	3	0.667
3	George Wink	2013	2	3	0.667
6	Ashton Hancock	2022	1	1	1
6	Javier Martínez	2022	1	1	1
6	Christian Zammitt-Agius	2019	1	1	1
6	Johnny Rush	2022	1	3	0.333
6	Liam Jessop	2021	1	5	0.2
6	Julian Valarino	2015–2016	1	5	0.2
6	Ethan Britto	2014–2016	1	7	0.143
6	Byron Espinosa	2013–2015	1	7	0.143
