= Gibraltar national under-16 football team =

Youth football team

Gibraltar Under-16
- Association: Gibraltar Football Association
- Confederation: UEFA (Europe)
- Head coach: Ryan Casciaro
- Captain: Ryan Casciaro Jr
- Home stadium: Victoria Stadium
- FIFA code: GIB
First colours	Second colours

First international
- Gibraltar 2–0 Malta (Gibraltar; 29 March 2015)

Biggest win
- San Marino 0–3 Gibraltar (Gibraltar; 30 March 2015)

Biggest defeat
- Northern Ireland 8–0 Gibraltar (Ruthin, Wales; 26 August 2025)

The Gibraltar national under-16 football team is the second-youngest active youth football team of Gibraltar, run by the Gibraltar Football Association. Prior to their accession to UEFA, an under-15 team participated in the Rock Cup, but this was scrapped in 2013. The team primarily participates in annual UEFA Development Tournaments, notably scoring a goal through Andrew Hernandez against Macedonia in 2015.

== Recent results and fixtures ==
4 March 2026 2026 UEFA Development Tournament	Malta	7–0	Gibraltar	Ta' Qali, Malta
13:30	Wright 5', 78'; Roe 22', 39'; Vella 28'; Higgans 71'; Zefara 89'			Stadium: Centenary Stadium

6 March 2026 2026 UEFA Development Tournament	Gibraltar	0–4	Andorra	Ta' Qali, Malta
				Stadium: Centenary Stadium

9 March 2026 2026 UEFA Development Tournament	Gibraltar	v	San Marino	Ta' Qali, Malta
				Stadium: Centenary Stadium

== Squad ==
=== Current squad ===
The following players were called up for 2026 UEFA Development Tournament in Malta:

- Match date: 4–9 March 2026
- Opposition: Malta, Andorra and San Marino
- Caps and goals correct as of: 4 March, after the match against Malta.

No.	Pos.	Player	Date of birth (age)	Caps	Goals	Club
13	GK	Lucas Becerra-Lopez	12 December 2010 (age 15)	6	0	(Gibraltar Football Association) Lincoln Red Imps
1	GK	Julian Guillem		3	0	(Gibraltar Football Association) St Joseph's
4	DF	Julian Lima		7	0	(Royal Spanish Football Federation) Atlético Zabal
5	DF	Ryan Casciaro (captain)	4 May 2010 (age 16)	4	0	(Gibraltar Football Association) Lincoln Red Imps
2	DF	Filipe Hill de Oliveira	19 February 2010 (age 16)	4	0	(Gibraltar Football Association) Lincoln Red Imps
3	DF	Leon Martinez	23 February 2010 (age 16)	4	0	(Gibraltar Football Association) Lincoln Red Imps
8	DF	Aaron Cordon		4	0	(Gibraltar Football Association) Lincoln Red Imps
6	DF	Kaion Drakes	24 May 2010 (age 16)	4	0	(Gibraltar Football Association) Lincoln Red Imps
10	MF	Liam Payas	17 June 2010 (age 16)	7	0	(Gibraltar Football Association) Lincoln Red Imps
14	MF	James Pincho Ríos		4	0	(Royal Spanish Football Federation) Algeciras
11	MF	Robert Guiling		4	0	(Royal Spanish Football Federation) RB Linense
12	MF	Matthew Sanchez		1	0	(Gibraltar Football Association) Lincoln Red Imps
15	MF	Imran El Hana		1	0	(Royal Spanish Football Federation) Recreativo
20	MF	Jayron Hernandez		1	0	(Gibraltar Football Association) St Joseph's
7	FW	Ilies Achhoud		7	1	(Royal Spanish Football Federation) Atlético Zabal
17	FW	Joshua Villa Lopes		4	0	(Royal Spanish Football Federation) Atlético Zabal
19	FW	Jaxsen Ramirez Alman	3 January 2010 (age 16)	4	0	(Gibraltar Football Association) Lincoln Red Imps
9	FW	Lucas Hill de Oliveira	19 February 2010 (age 16)	1	0	(Gibraltar Football Association) Lincoln Red Imps
16	FW	Callum Gomez		1	0	(Gibraltar Football Association) St Joseph's
