= Gibraltar national football team results =

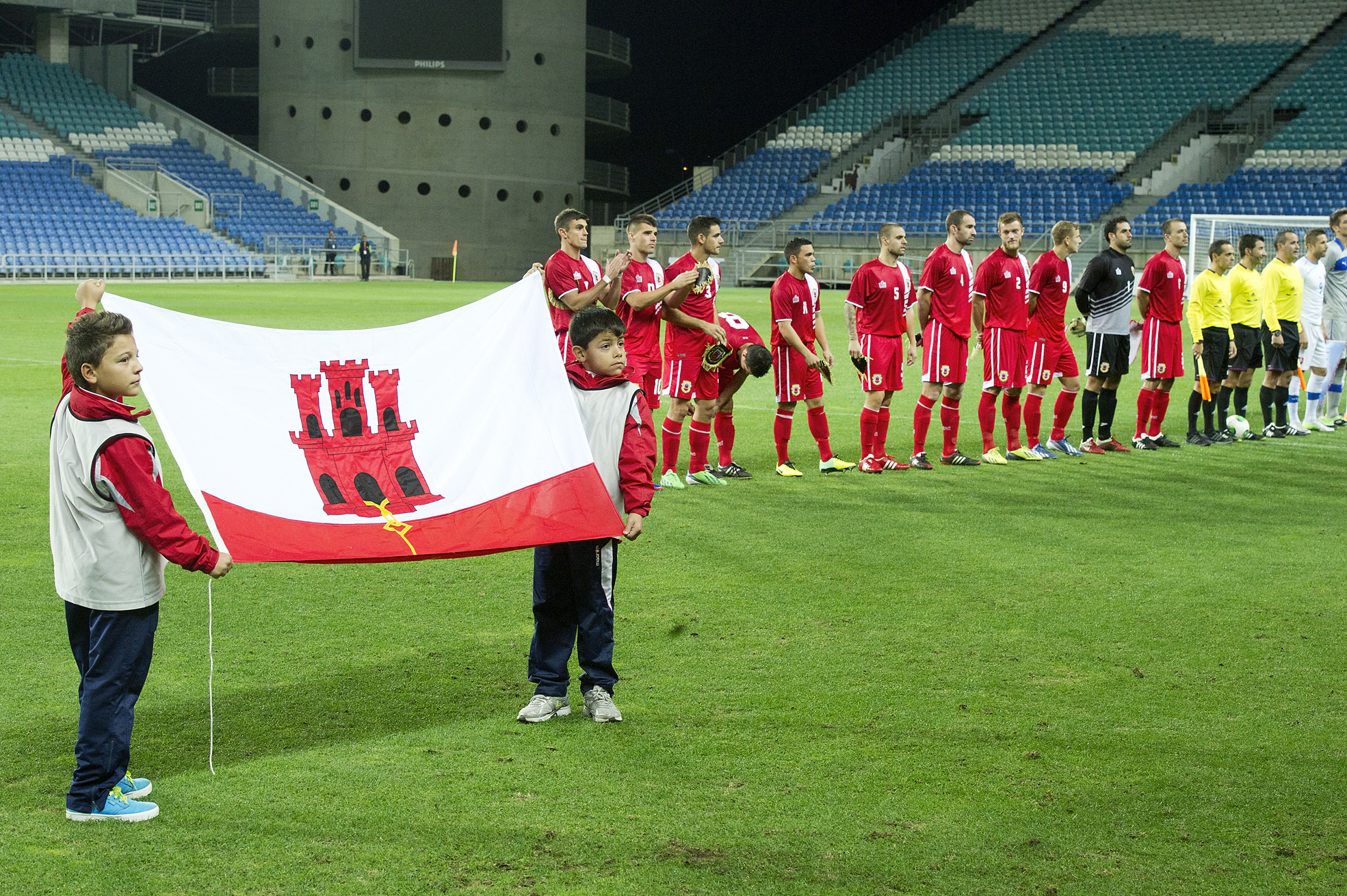
The Gibraltar team lining up before the 2013 match against Slovakia, their first official match as a UEFA member.

The Gibraltar national football team is the representative association football team of Gibraltar, a British Overseas Territory located at the southern tip of the Iberian Peninsula. Its governing body is the Gibraltar Football Association (GFA) and it competes as a member of the Union of European Football Associations (UEFA). Organised football has been played in Gibraltar since the 19th century. The GFA first applied for UEFA membership in 1997 which was rejected, as UEFA would only allow membership for applicants recognised as sovereign states by the United Nations. They were unsuccessful in their second application in 2007 when only three of UEFA's 52 associations voted in their favour. In October 2012, they reapplied for membership which was granted in March 2013. Before 2018 the team's home ground, Victoria Stadium, did not meet UEFA's standards for competitive internationals, although it could be used for international friendlies. Gibraltar's first full international was played at the Estádio Algarve, located between Faro and Loulé, Portugal, which Gibraltar used as their home stadium for competitive matches between 2014 and 2018, and again from 2023 to 2024. In May 2024 UEFA granted permission for Gibraltar to use the Europa Point Stadium for international matches.

Gibraltar's first announced matches were two friendlies scheduled for 5 March and 26 May 2014 as a home-and-away series against Estonia. They subsequently scheduled a match against Slovakia for 19 November 2013 which became Gibraltar's official debut, the match ended 0–0. In 2014 Gibraltar entered its first major international competition: the qualifying rounds for UEFA Euro 2016, they lost all ten matches, scoring 2 goals and conceding 56, therefore failing to qualify for the main tournament. On 13 May 2016, Gibraltar was accepted as a member of the International Federation of Association Football (FIFA) after its original application in 2014 was denied; as a result Gibraltar was allowed to participate in the qualification process for the 2018 FIFA World Cup.

The team recorded its first victory in June 2014, 1–0 against Malta in a friendly match. Their largest victory came in another friendly match in June 2026, 4–0 against the British Virgin Islands. Their worst loss is 14–0 against France in a UEFA European Championship qualifier on 18 November 2023. As of the match played on 16 November 2026, Gibraltar's overall record is 114 fixtures played, winning 13, drawing 18 and losing the remaining 83.

== International matches ==
These are the official results of the Gibraltar national football team since being accepted into UEFA in 2013. Matches played before obtaining UEFA membership are unofficial matches and are not included. Gibraltar's score is shown first in each case. The colours listed below are also used to signify results combined with the scoreline.

Key
Colour	Meaning
	Defeat
	Draw
	Win

Gibraltar national football team results (Note: Table information sourced from the references listed in the statistics section below.)
No.	Date	Venue	H/A	Opponent	Score	Competition	Gibraltar scorer(s) and time of goal(s)	Att.	Ref.
1	19 November 2013	Estádio Algarve, Faro/Loulé	H	Slovakia	0–0	Friendly		350	
2	1 March 2014	Victoria Stadium, Gibraltar	H	Faroe Islands	1–4	Friendly	Roy Chipolina 21'	500	
3	5 March 2014	Victoria Stadium, Gibraltar	H	Estonia	0–2	Friendly		1,906	
4	26 May 2014	A. Le Coq Arena, Tallinn	A	Estonia	1–1	Friendly	Jake Gosling 71'	4,805	
5	4 June 2014	Estádio Algarve, Faro/Loulé	H	Malta	1–0	Friendly	Kyle Casciaro 64'	500	
6	7 September 2014	Estádio Algarve, Faro/Loulé	H	Poland	0–7	UEFA Euro 2016 qualifying		1,620	
7	11 October 2014	Aviva Stadium, Dublin	A	Republic of Ireland	0–7	UEFA Euro 2016 qualifying		35,123	
8	14 October 2014	Estádio Algarve, Faro/Loulé	H	Georgia	0–3	UEFA Euro 2016 qualifying		281	
9	14 November 2014	Grundig-Stadion, Nuremberg	A	Germany	0–4	UEFA Euro 2016 qualifying		44,380	
10	29 March 2015	Hampden Park, Glasgow	A	Scotland	1–6	UEFA Euro 2016 qualifying	Lee Casciaro 19'	34,255	
11	7 June 2015	Stadion Varteks, Varaždin	A	Croatia	0–4	Friendly		7,737	
12	13 June 2015	Estádio Algarve, Faro/Loulé	H	Germany	0–7	UEFA Euro 2016 qualifying		7,467	
13	4 September 2015	Estádio Algarve, Faro/Loulé	H	Republic of Ireland	0–4	UEFA Euro 2016 qualifying		5,393	
14	7 September 2015	National Stadium, Warsaw	A	Poland	1–8	UEFA Euro 2016 qualifying	Jake Gosling 87'	27,763	
15	8 October 2015	Boris Paichadze Dinamo Arena, Tbilisi	A	Georgia	0–4	UEFA Euro 2016 qualifying		11,330	
16	11 October 2015	Estádio Algarve, Faro/Loulé	H	Scotland	0–6	UEFA Euro 2016 qualifying		12,401	
17	23 March 2016	Victoria Stadium, Gibraltar	H	Liechtenstein	0–0	Friendly		800	
18	29 March 2016	Victoria Stadium, Gibraltar	H	Latvia	0–5	Friendly		1,000	
19	1 September 2016	Estádio do Bessa, Porto	A	Portugal	0–5	Friendly		22,000	
20	6 September 2016	Estádio Algarve, Faro/Loulé	H	Greece	1–4	2018 FIFA World Cup qualification	Liam Walker 26'	460	
21	7 October 2016	A. Le Coq Arena, Tallinn	A	Estonia	0–4	2018 FIFA World Cup qualification		4,678	
22	10 October 2016	Estádio Algarve, Faro/Loulé	H	Belgium	0–6	2018 FIFA World Cup qualification		1,959	
23	13 November 2016	GSP Stadium, Nicosia	A	Cyprus	1–3	2018 FIFA World Cup qualification	Lee Casciaro 51'	3,151	
24	25 March 2017	Bilino Polje Stadium, Zenica	A	Bosnia and Herzegovina	0–5	2018 FIFA World Cup qualification		8,285	
25	9 June 2017	Estádio Algarve, Faro/Loulé	H	Cyprus	1–2	2018 FIFA World Cup qualification	Anthony Hernandez 30'	488	
26	31 August 2017	Stade Maurice Dufrasne, Liège	A	Belgium	0–9	2018 FIFA World Cup qualification		27,000	
27	3 September 2017	Estádio Algarve, Faro/Loulé	H	Bosnia and Herzegovina	0–4	2018 FIFA World Cup qualification		805	
28	7 October 2017	Estádio Algarve, Faro/Loulé	H	Estonia	0–6	2018 FIFA World Cup qualification		712	
29	10 October 2017	Karaiskakis Stadium, Piraeus	A	Greece	0–4	2018 FIFA World Cup qualification		12,739	
30	25 March 2018	Victoria Stadium, Gibraltar	H	Latvia	1–0	Friendly	Liam Walker 88'	1,306	
31	6 September 2018	Victoria Stadium, Gibraltar	H	Macedonia	0–2	2018–19 UEFA Nations League D		1,500	
32	9 September 2018	Rheinpark Stadion, Vaduz	A	Liechtenstein	0–2	2018–19 UEFA Nations League D		1,500	
33	13 October 2018	Republican Stadium, Yerevan	A	Armenia	1–0	2018–19 UEFA Nations League D	Joseph Chipolina 50' (p)	11,000	
34	16 October 2018	Victoria Stadium, Gibraltar	H	Liechtenstein	2–1	2018–19 UEFA Nations League D	George Cabrera 61', Joseph Chipolina 66'	2,000	
35	16 November 2018	Victoria Stadium, Gibraltar	H	Armenia	2–6	2018–19 UEFA Nations League D	Tjay De Barr 10', Adam Priestley 78'	1,955	
36	19 November 2018	Philip II Arena, Skopje	A	Macedonia	0–4	2018–19 UEFA Nations League D		2,152	
37	23 March 2019	Victoria Stadium, Gibraltar	H	Republic of Ireland	0–1	UEFA Euro 2020 qualifying		2,000	
38	26 March 2019	Victoria Stadium, Gibraltar	H	Estonia	0–1	Friendly		1,900	
39	7 June 2019	Boris Paichadze Dinamo Arena, Tbilisi	A	Georgia	0–3	UEFA Euro 2020 qualifying		18,631	
40	10 June 2019	Aviva Stadium, Dublin	A	Republic of Ireland	0–2	UEFA Euro 2020 qualifying		36,281	
41	5 September 2019	Victoria Stadium, Gibraltar	H	Denmark	0–6	UEFA Euro 2020 qualifying		2,076	
42	8 September 2019	Stade Tourbillon, Sion	A	Switzerland	0–4	UEFA Euro 2020 qualifying		8,318	
43	10 October 2019	Fadil Vokrri Stadium, Pristina	A	Kosovo	0–1	Friendly		12,000	
44	15 October 2019	Victoria Stadium, Gibraltar	H	Georgia	2–3	UEFA Euro 2020 qualifying	Lee Casciaro 66', Roy Chipolina 74'	1,455	
45	15 November 2019	Parken Stadium, Copenhagen	A	Denmark	0–6	UEFA Euro 2020 qualifying		24,033	
46	18 November 2019	Victoria Stadium, Gibraltar	H	Switzerland	1–6	UEFA Euro 2020 qualifying	Reece Styche 74'	2,000	
47	5 September 2020	Victoria Stadium, Gibraltar	H	San Marino	1–0	2020–21 UEFA Nations League D	Graeme Torrilla 42'	0 (Note: This match was played behind closed doors due to the coronavirus pandemic.)	
48	7 October 2020	National Stadium, Ta' Qali	A	Malta	0–2	Friendly		0	
49	10 October 2020	Rheinpark Stadion, Vaduz	A	Liechtenstein	1–0	2020–21 UEFA Nations League D	Tjay De Barr 10'	178	
50	11 November 2020	Vasil Levski National Stadium, Sofia	A	Bulgaria	0–3	Friendly		0	
51	14 November 2020	San Marino Stadium, Serravalle	A	San Marino	0–0	2020–21 UEFA Nations League D		0	
52	17 November 2020	Victoria Stadium, Gibraltar	H	Liechtenstein	1–1	2020–21 UEFA Nations League D	Noah Frommelt 17' (o.g.)	0	
53	24 March 2021	Victoria Stadium, Gibraltar	H	Norway	0–3	2022 FIFA World Cup qualification		0	
54	27 March 2021	Podgorica City Stadium, Podgorica	A	Montenegro	1–4	2022 FIFA World Cup qualification	Reece Styche 30' (p)	0	
55	30 March 2021	Victoria Stadium, Gibraltar	H	Netherlands	0–7	2022 FIFA World Cup qualification		335	
56	4 June 2021	Bonifika Stadium, Koper	A	Slovenia	0–6	Friendly		500	
57	7 June 2021	Estadi Nacional, Andorra la Vella	A	Andorra	0–0	Friendly		0	
58	1 September 2021	Daugava Stadium, Riga	A	Latvia	1–3	2022 FIFA World Cup qualification	Tjay De Barr 71' (p)	1,466	
59	4 September 2021	Victoria Stadium, Gibraltar	H	Turkey	0–3	2022 FIFA World Cup qualification		702	
60	7 September 2021	Ullevaal Stadion, Oslo	A	Norway	1–5	2022 FIFA World Cup qualification	Reece Styche 43'	9,442	
61	8 October 2021	Victoria Stadium, Gibraltar	H	Montenegro	0–3	2022 FIFA World Cup qualification		1,351	
62	11 October 2021	De Kuip, Rotterdam	A	Netherlands	0–6	2022 FIFA World Cup qualification		31,583	
63	13 November 2021	Başakşehir Fatih Terim Stadium, Istanbul	A	Turkey	0–6	2022 FIFA World Cup qualification		8,895	
64	16 November 2021	Victoria Stadium, Gibraltar	H	Latvia	1–3	2022 FIFA World Cup qualification	Liam Walker 7'	1,130	
65	23 March 2022	Victoria Stadium, Gibraltar	H	Grenada	0–0	Friendly		410	
66	26 March 2022	Victoria Stadium, Gibraltar	H	Faroe Islands	0–0	Friendly		727	
67	2 June 2022	Boris Paichadze Dinamo Arena, Tbilisi	A	Georgia	0–4	2022–23 UEFA Nations League C		43,412	
68	5 June 2022	Victoria Stadium, Gibraltar	H	North Macedonia	0–2	2022–23 UEFA Nations League C		703	
69	9 June 2022	Victoria Stadium, Gibraltar	H	Bulgaria	1–1	2022–23 UEFA Nations League C	Liam Walker 61' (p)	1,427	
70	12 June 2022	Toše Proeski Arena, Skopje	A	North Macedonia	0–4	2022–23 UEFA Nations League C		4,750	
71	23 September 2022	Huvepharma Arena, Razgrad	A	Bulgaria	1–5	2022–23 UEFA Nations League C	Roy Chipolina 26'	1,540	
72	26 September 2022	Victoria Stadium, Gibraltar	H	Georgia	1–2	2022–23 UEFA Nations League C	Louie Annesley 75'	1,199	
73	16 November 2022	Victoria Stadium, Gibraltar	H	Liechtenstein	2–0	Friendly	Roy Chipolina 14', Liam Walker 21' (p)	558	
74	19 November 2022	Victoria Stadium, Gibraltar	H	Andorra	1–0	Friendly	Roy Chipolina 34'	2,006	
75	24 March 2023	Estádio Algarve, Faro/Loulé	H	Greece	0–3	UEFA Euro 2024 qualifying		390	
76	27 March 2023	De Kuip, Rotterdam	A	Netherlands	0–3	UEFA Euro 2024 qualifying		36,327	
77	16 June 2023	Estádio Algarve, Faro/Loulé	H	France	0–3	UEFA Euro 2024 qualifying		4,065	
78	19 June 2023	Aviva Stadium, Dublin	A	Republic of Ireland	0–3	UEFA Euro 2024 qualifying		42,156	
79	6 September 2023	National Stadium, Ta' Qali	A	Malta	0–1	Friendly		821	
80	10 September 2023	Agia Sophia Stadium, Athens	A	Greece	0–5	UEFA Euro 2024 qualifying		9,774	
81	11 October 2023	Racecourse Ground, Wrexham	A	Wales	0–4	Friendly		10,008	
82	16 October 2023	Estádio Algarve, Faro/Loulé	H	Republic of Ireland	0–4	UEFA Euro 2024 qualifying		4,000	
83	18 November 2023	Allianz Riviera, Nice	A	France	0–14	UEFA Euro 2024 qualifying		32,758	
84	21 November 2023	Estádio Algarve, Faro/Loulé	H	Netherlands	0–6	UEFA Euro 2024 qualifying		2,280	
85	21 March 2024	Estádio Algarve, Faro/Loulé	H	Lithuania	0–1	2022–23 UEFA Nations League C relegation play-out		207	
86	26 March 2024	Darius and Girėnas Stadium, Kaunas	A	Lithuania	0–1	2022–23 UEFA Nations League C relegation play-out		6,102	
87	3 June 2024	Estádio Algarve, Faro/Loulé	H	Scotland	0–2	Friendly		15,552	
88	6 June 2024	Estádio Algarve, Faro/Loulé	H	Wales	0–0	Friendly		5,004	
89	4 September 2024	Europa Point Stadium, Gibraltar	H	Andorra	1–0	Friendly	Dan Bent 18'		
90	8 September 2024	Europa Point Stadium, Gibraltar	H	Liechtenstein	2–2	2024–25 UEFA Nations League D	Liam Walker 8', James Scanlon 90+7'	681	
91	10 October 2024	Europa Point Stadium, Gibraltar	H	San Marino	1–0	2024–25 UEFA Nations League D	Ethan Britto 62'	677	
92	13 October 2024	Rheinpark Stadion, Vaduz	A	Liechtenstein	0–0	2024–25 UEFA Nations League D		1,510	
93	15 November 2024	San Marino Stadium, Serravalle	A	San Marino	1–1	2024–25 UEFA Nations League D	Liam Walker 11' (p)	1,324	
94	19 November 2024	Europa Point Stadium, Gibraltar	H	Moldova	1–1	Friendly	Liam Walker 68' (p)	580	
95	22 March 2025	Gradski stadion, Nikšić	A	Montenegro	1–3	2026 FIFA World Cup qualification	Dan Bent 13'	3,021	
96	25 March 2025	Estádio Algarve, Faro/Loulé	H	Czech Republic	0–4	2026 FIFA World Cup qualification		583	
97	6 June 2025	Estádio Algarve, Faro/Loulé	H	Croatia	0–7	2026 FIFA World Cup qualification		1,516	
98	9 June 2025	Tórsvøllur, Tórshavn	A	Faroe Islands	1–2	2026 FIFA World Cup qualification	James Scanlon 23'	2,632	
99	4 September 2025	Europa Point Stadium, Gibraltar	H	Albania	0–1	Friendly		2,000	
100	8 September 2025	Europa Point Stadium, Gibraltar	H	Faroe Islands	0–1	2026 FIFA World Cup qualification		1,603	
101	8 October 2025	Europa Point Stadium, Gibraltar	H	New Caledonia	0–2	Friendly		602	
102	12 October 2025	Stadion Varteks, Varaždin	A	Croatia	0–3	2026 FIFA World Cup qualification		7,579	
103	14 November 2025	Europa Point Stadium, Gibraltar	H	Montenegro	1–2	2026 FIFA World Cup qualification	Liam Jessop 30'	668	
104	17 November 2025	Andrův stadion, Olomouc	A	Czech Republic	0–6	2026 FIFA World Cup qualification		6,587	
105	26 March 2026	Europa Point Stadium, Gibraltar	H	Latvia	0–1	2024–25 UEFA Nations League C v D play-off		1,442	
106	31 March 2026	Skonto Stadium, Riga	A	Latvia	0–1	2024–25 UEFA Nations League C v D play-off		5,120	
107	3 June 2026	Europa Point Stadium, Gibraltar	H	British Virgin Islands	4–0	Friendly	Johari Lacey 10' (o.g.), James Scanlon (2) 32', 64', Leon Mason 42'	992	
108	6 June 2026	Europa Point Stadium, Gibraltar	H	Cayman Islands	4–1	Friendly	James Scanlon 12', Dylan Borge 49', Julian Valarino 57', Tjay De Barr 59'	779	
109	23 September 2026	Europa Point Stadium, Gibraltar	H	São Tomé and Príncipe	0–0	Friendly		587	
110	27 September 2026	Europa Point Stadium, Gibraltar	H	Andorra	0–0	2026–27 UEFA Nations League D		1,382	
111	1 October 2026	National Stadium, Ta' Qali	A	Malta	1–1	2026–27 UEFA Nations League D	James Scanlon 61'	4,090	
112	5 October 2026	Rheinpark Stadion, Vaduz	A	Liechtenstein	2–0	Friendly	Bernardo Lopes 20', Dylan Borge 57'	972	
113	13 November 2026	Estadi de la FAF, Encamp	A	Andorra	0–2	2026–27 UEFA Nations League D		710	
114	16 November 2026	Europa Point Stadium, Gibraltar	H	Malta	1–1	2026–27 UEFA Nations League D	Carlos Richards 81'		

== Head to head records ==
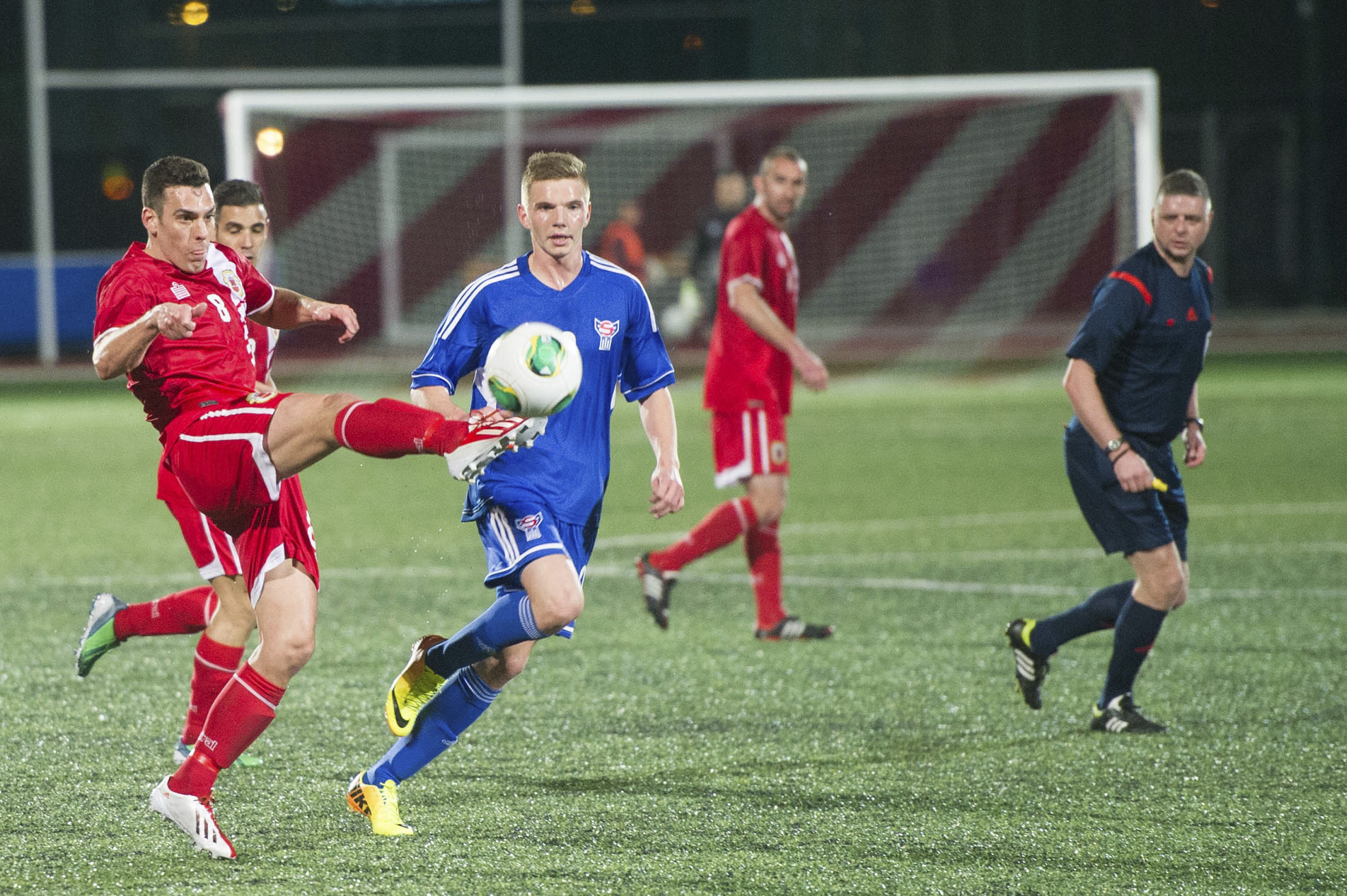
Gibraltar playing against the Faroe Islands at the Victoria Stadium in 2014.

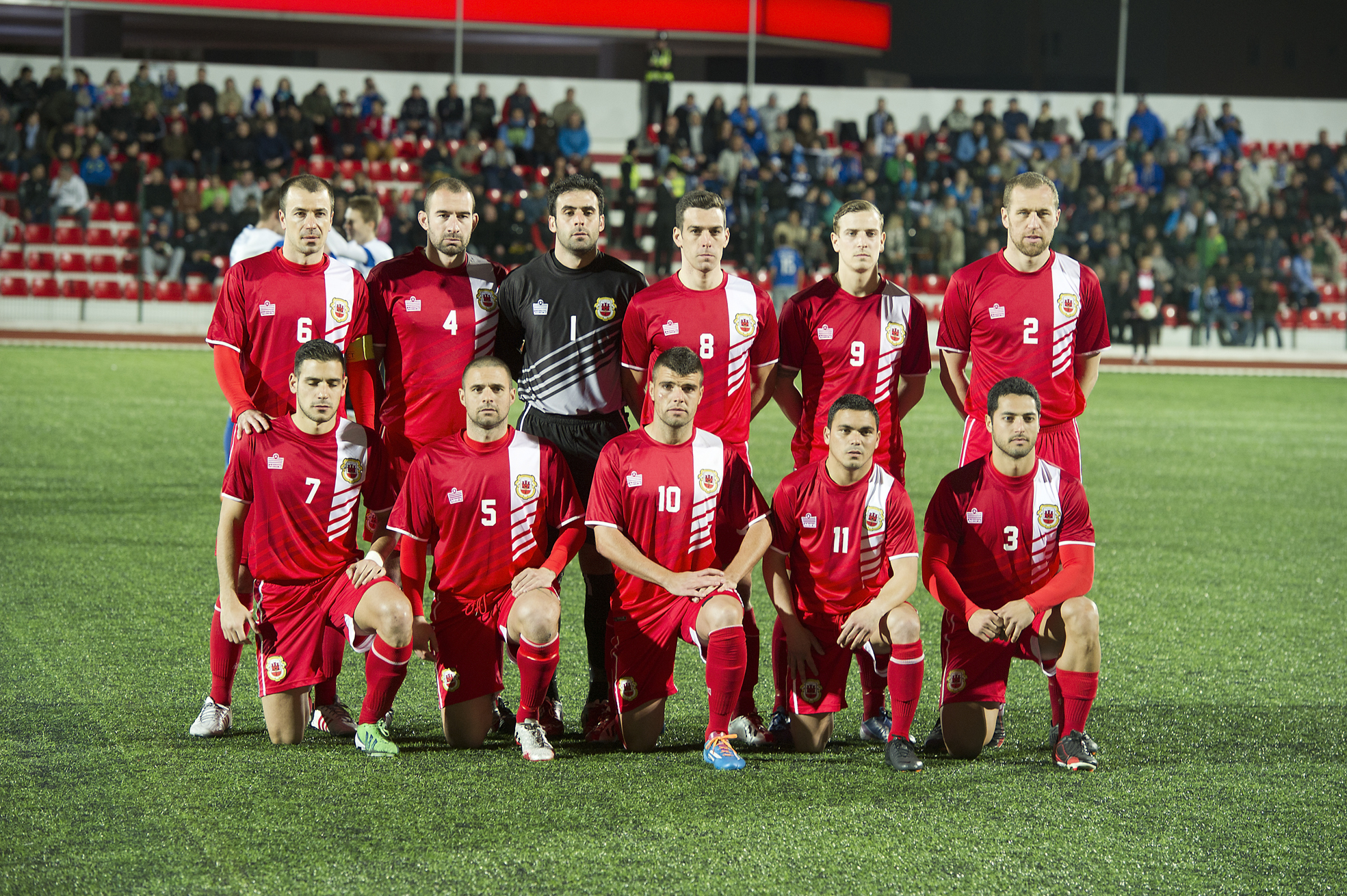
Gibraltar players line-up before their match against Estonia in 2014.

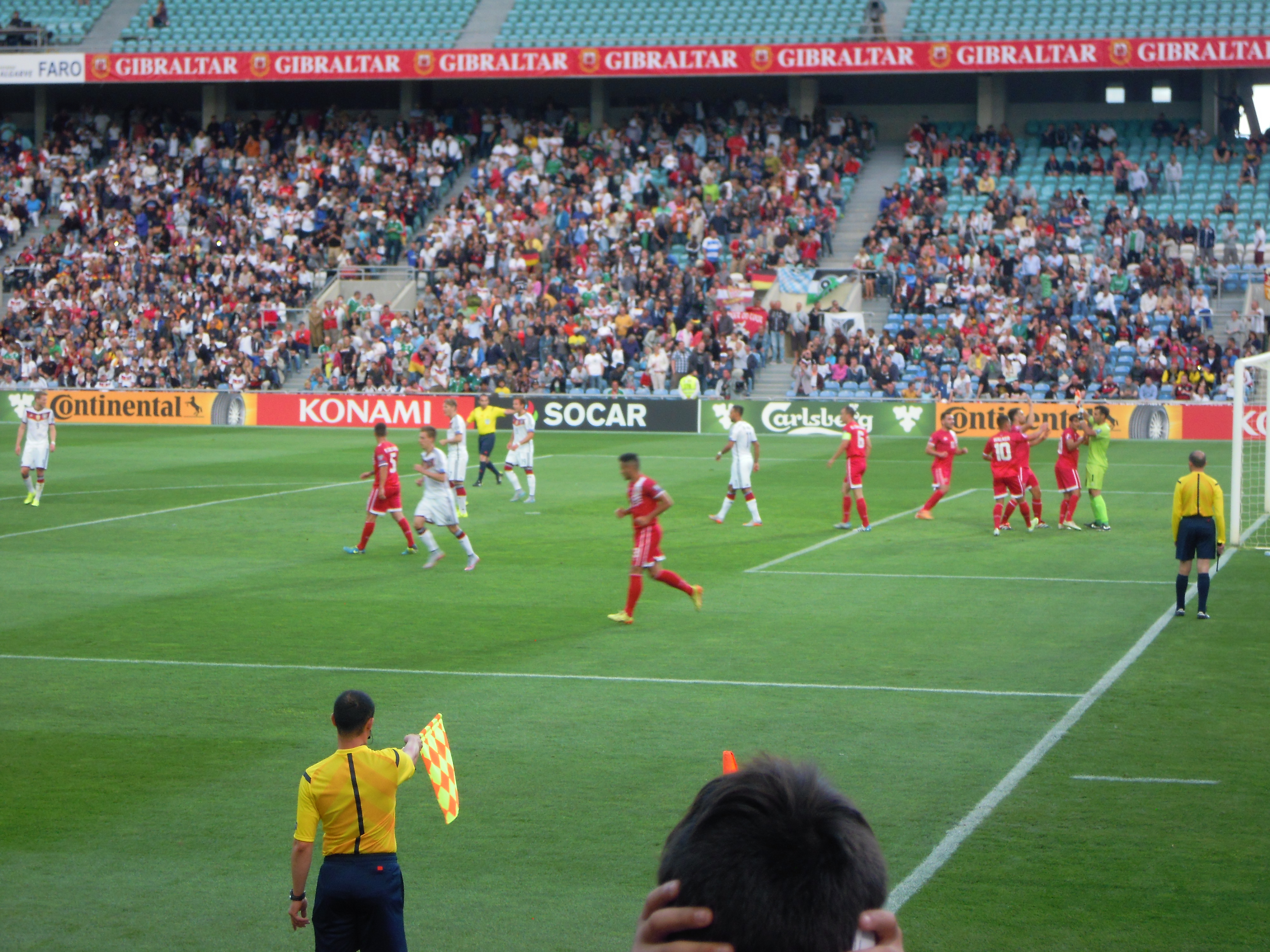
Goalkeeper Jordan Pérez is congratulated by his teammates after saving a penalty against Germany.

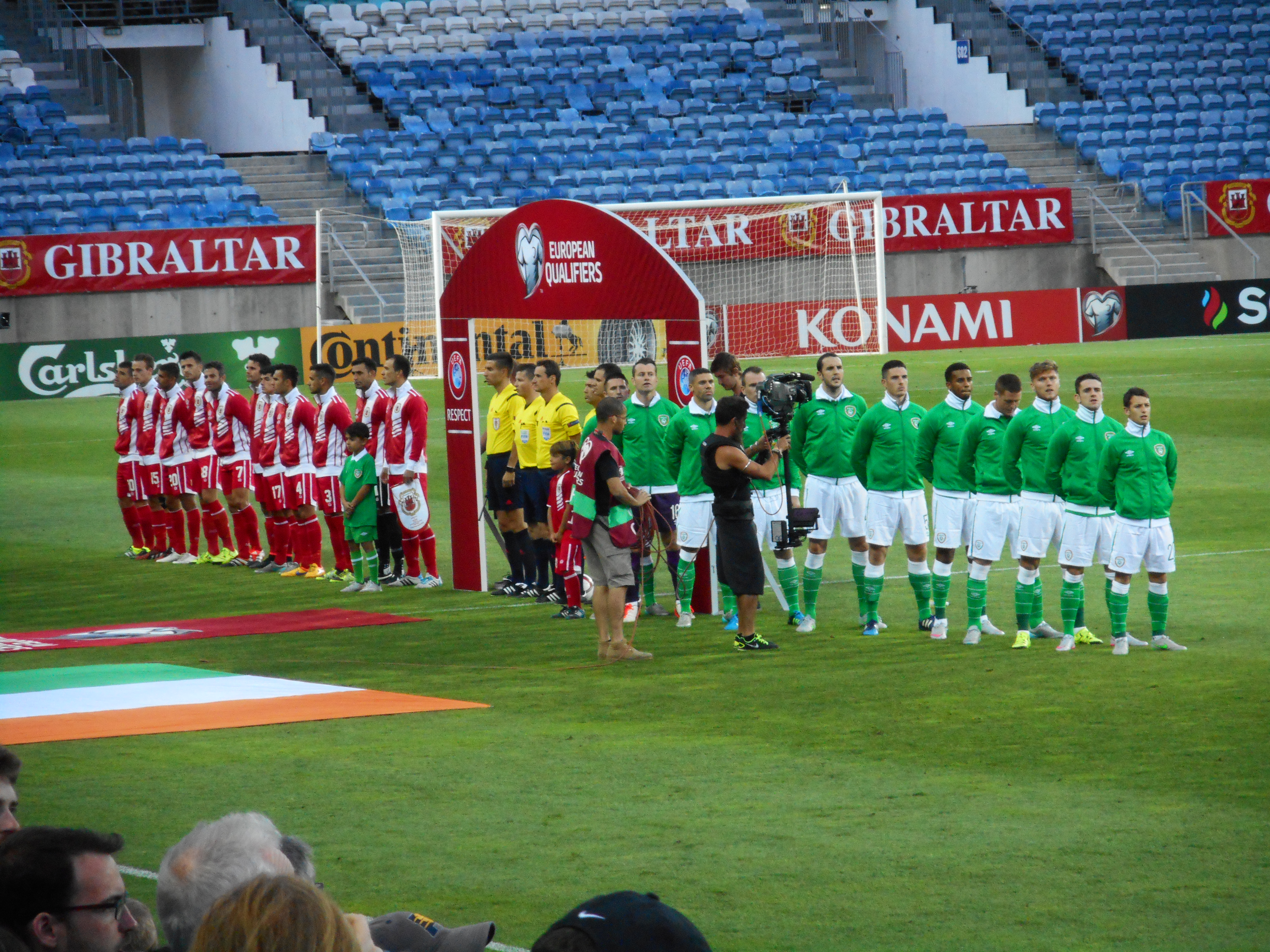
Gibraltar and Republic of Ireland lining up before their match in 2015.

Opponents	Pld	W	D	L	GF	GA	GD	W%	First	Last
Albania	1	0	0	1	0	1	−1	0.00	2025	2025
Andorra	4	2	2	0	2	0	+2	50.00	2021	2026
Armenia	2	1	0	1	3	6	−3	50.00	2018	2018
Belgium	2	0	0	2	0	15	−15	0.00	2016	2017
Bosnia and Herzegovina	2	0	0	2	0	9	−9	0.00	2017	2017
British Virgin Islands	1	1	0	0	4	0	+4	100.00	2026	2026
Bulgaria	3	0	1	2	2	9	−7	0.00	2020	2022
Cayman Islands	1	1	0	0	4	1	+3	100.00	2026	2026
Croatia	3	0	0	3	0	14	−14	0.00	2015	2025
Cyprus	2	0	0	2	2	5	−3	0.00	2016	2017
Czech Republic	2	0	0	2	0	10	−10	0.00	2025	2025
Denmark	2	0	0	2	0	12	−12	0.00	2019	2019
Estonia	5	0	1	4	1	14	−13	0.00	2014	2019
Faroe Islands	4	0	1	3	2	7	−5	0.00	2014	2025
France	2	0	0	2	0	17	−17	0.00	2023	2023
Georgia	6	0	0	6	3	19	−16	0.00	2014	2022
Germany	2	0	0	2	0	11	−11	0.00	2014	2015
Greece	4	0	0	4	1	16	−15	0.00	2016	2023
Grenada	1	0	1	0	0	0	+0	0.00	2022	2022
Kosovo	1	0	0	1	0	1	−1	0.00	2019	2019
Latvia	6	1	0	5	3	13	−10	16.67	2016	2026
Liechtenstein	9	4	4	1	10	6	+4	44.44	2016	2026
Lithuania	2	0	0	2	0	2	−2	0.00	2024	2024
Malta	4	1	1	2	2	4	−2	25.00	2014	2026
Moldova	1	0	1	0	1	1	+0	0.00	2024	2024
Montenegro	4	0	0	4	3	12	−9	0.00	2021	2025
Netherlands	4	0	0	4	0	22	−22	0.00	2021	2023
New Caledonia	1	0	0	1	0	2	−2	0.00	2025	2025
North Macedonia	4	0	0	4	0	12	−12	0.00	2018	2022
Norway	2	0	0	2	1	8	−7	0.00	2021	2021
Poland	2	0	0	2	1	15	−14	0.00	2014	2015
Portugal	1	0	0	1	0	5	−5	0.00	2016	2016
Republic of Ireland	6	0	0	6	0	21	−21	0.00	2014	2023
San Marino	4	2	2	0	3	1	+2	50.00	2020	2024
São Tomé and Príncipe	1	0	1	0	0	0	+0	0.00	2026	2026
Scotland	3	0	0	3	1	14	−13	0.00	2015	2024
Slovakia	1	0	1	0	0	0	+0	0.00	2013	2013
Slovenia	1	0	0	1	0	6	−6	0.00	2021	2021
Switzerland	2	0	0	2	1	10	−9	0.00	2019	2019
Turkey	2	0	0	2	0	9	−9	0.00	2021	2021
Wales	2	0	1	1	0	4	−4	0.00	2023	2024
Total	112	13	17	82	50	334	−284	11.61	2013	2026

== See also ==
- Gibraltar national football team results (unofficial matches)
- Gibraltar national football team records and statistics
