= Gibraltar national football team records and statistics =

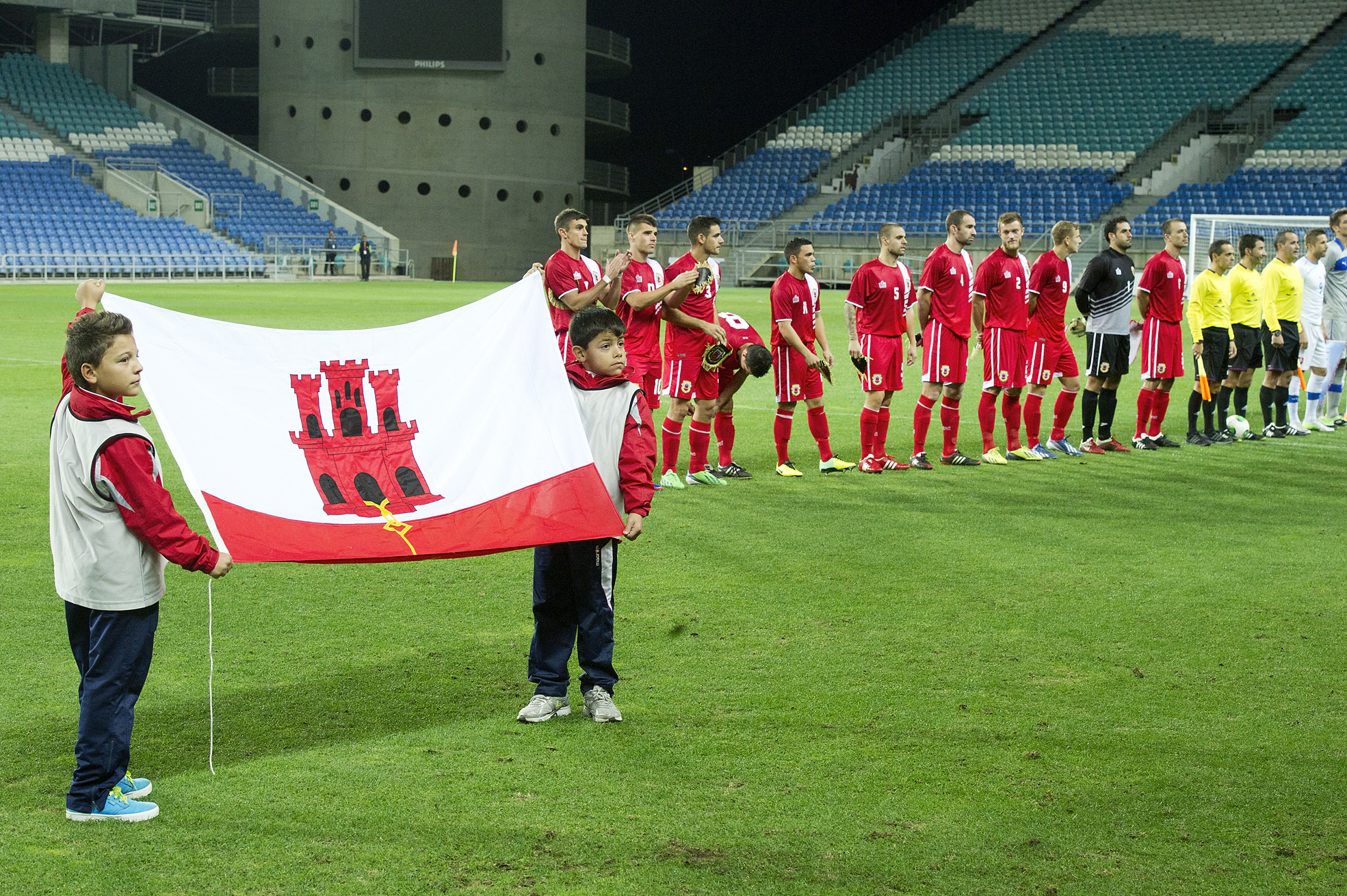
The Gibraltar team lining up before their 2013 match against Slovakia; the team's first official match as a UEFA member.

The Gibraltar national football team represents Gibraltar in football and is controlled by the Gibraltar Football Association (GFA), the local governing body of that sport. It competes as a member of the Union of European Football Associations (UEFA), which encompasses the countries of Europe. Organised football has been played in the country since the 19th century. Gibraltar first applied for UEFA membership in 1997 which was rejected, as UEFA would only allow membership for applicants recognised as sovereign states by the United Nations. In October 2012, Gibraltar reapplied for membership and it was granted in March 2013.

The list encompasses the records set by the team, their managers and their players since joining UEFA in 2013. The player records section itemises the team's leading goalscorers and those who have made most appearances in first-team competitions. Gibraltar's record appearance maker is Liam Walker, who has made 88 appearances since 2013. Walker is also the record goalscorer, scoring eight goals in total. All figures are correct as of the match played on 21 August 2026.

== Player records ==
=== Appearances ===
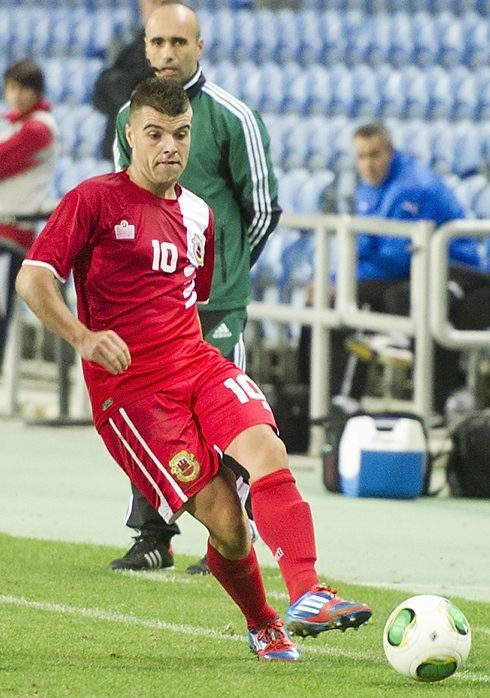
Liam Walker holds the appearances record for Gibraltar with 88 caps, and is the top goalscorer with 8 goals.

- Most appearances: Liam Walker, 88 (from 19 November 2013 to 9 June 2025)
- Most consecutive appearances: Liam Walker, 40 (from 5 March 2014 to 8 September 2019)
- Youngest appearances: Luca Scanlon, 16 years and 57 days, 8 September 2025 v Faroe Islands
- Oldest appearances: Lee Casciaro, 44 years and 247 days, 3 June 2026 v British Virgin Islands

==== List of ten most capped players ====
Rank	Player	Caps	Goals	Career
1	Liam Walker	88	8	2013–present
2	Roy Chipolina	75	5	2013–2024
3	Lee Casciaro	66	3	2014–present
4	Jayce Olivero	63	0	2016–present
5	Joseph Chipolina	61	2	2013–present
5	Jack Sergeant	61	0	2013–present
7	Louie Annesley	52	1	2018–present
7	Tjay De Barr	52	3	2018–present
9	Ethan Britto	46	1	2018–present
10	Kian Ronan	41	0	2020–present

=== Goalscorers ===
- Top goalscorer: Liam Walker, 8 (from 19 November 2013 to 9 June 2025)

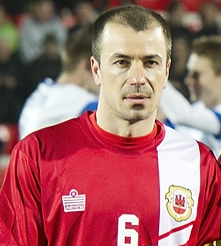
Roy Chipolina scored Gibraltar's first goal as members of UEFA.

- First goal scored: Roy Chipolina, 1 March 2014, 1–4 v Faroe Islands
- First goal conceded: Jóan Símun Edmundsson, 1 March 2014, 1–4 v Faroe Islands
- Fastest goal scored: 6 minutes and 29 seconds by Liam Walker, 16 November 2021 v Latvia
- Latest goal scored: 97th minute by James Scanlon, 8 September 2024 v Liechtenstein
- Fastest goal conceded: 1st minutes (2 times)
  - 8.1 seconds by Christian Benteke, 10 October 2016 v Belgium (4th fastest international soccer goal)
  - 37 seconds by Christopher Reeves, 6 June 2026 v Cayman Islands
- Latest goal conceded: 104th minute by Nicolas Hasler, 8 September 2024 v Liechtenstein
- Most goals in a match: 2 by James Scanlon, 3 June 2026 v British Virgin Islands
- Most goals by a opponent in a match: 4 (2 times)
  - by Robert Lewandowski, 7 September 2014 v Poland
  - by Yura Movsisyan, 16 November 2018 v Armenia
- Oldest player to score: Roy Chipolina (39 years, 303 days)
- Youngest player to score: James Scanlon (17 years, 346 days)

==== List of goalscorers ====
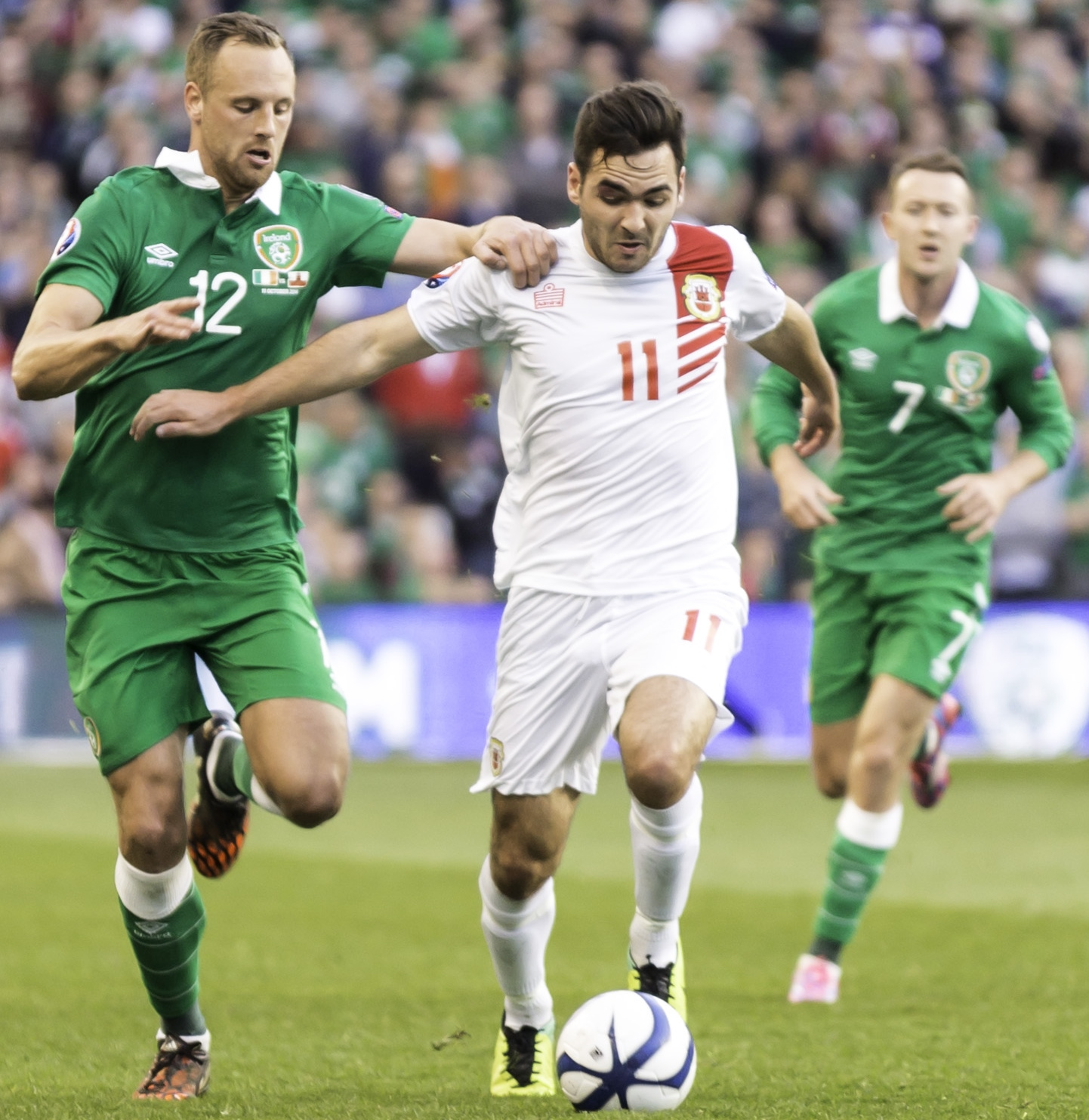
Jake Gosling was the first player to score more than one goal for the national team.

Rank	Player	Goals	Caps	Ratio	Career
1	Liam Walker	8	88	0.091	2013–present
2	Roy Chipolina	5	75	0.067	2013–2024
3	Lee Casciaro	3	66	0.045	2014–present
3	Tjay De Barr	3	52	0.058	2018–present
3	Reece Styche	3	31	0.097	2014–present
6	Dan Bent	2	9	0.222	2024–present
6	Joseph Chipolina	2	61	0.033	2013–present
6	Jake Gosling	2	12	0.167	2014–2018
6	James Scanlon	2	14	0.143	2024–present
10	Louie Annesley	1	52	0.019	2018–present
10	George Cabrera	1	8	0.125	2014–2018
10	Kyle Casciaro	1	26	0.038	2013–2020
10	Anthony Hernandez	1	28	0.036	2014–present
10	Adam Priestley	1	18	0.056	2013–present
10	Graeme Torrilla	1	33	0.03	2020–present

==== Progression of goalscoring record ====
Goals	Player	Date	Opponent	Score	Notes
1	Roy Chipolina	1 March 2014	Faroe Islands	1–4	(Note: Roy Chipolina, Jake Gosling, Kyle Casciaro and Lee Casciaro jointly held the record with one goal.)
1	Jake Gosling	26 May 2014	Estonia	1–1	(Note: Roy Chipolina, Jake Gosling, Kyle Casciaro and Lee Casciaro jointly held the record with one goal.)
1	Kyle Casciaro	4 June 2014	Malta	1–0	(Note: Roy Chipolina, Jake Gosling, Kyle Casciaro and Lee Casciaro jointly held the record with one goal.)
1	Lee Casciaro	29 March 2015	Scotland	1–6	(Note: Roy Chipolina, Jake Gosling, Kyle Casciaro and Lee Casciaro jointly held the record with one goal.)
2	Jake Gosling	7 September 2015	Poland	1–8	(Note: Jake Gosling, Lee Casciaro, Liam Walker and Joseph Chipolina jointly held the record with two goals.)
2	Lee Casciaro	13 November 2016	Cyprus	1–3	(Note: Jake Gosling, Lee Casciaro, Liam Walker and Joseph Chipolina jointly held the record with two goals.)
2	Liam Walker	25 March 2018	Latvia	1–0	(Note: Jake Gosling, Lee Casciaro, Liam Walker and Joseph Chipolina jointly held the record with two goals.)
2	Joseph Chipolina	16 October 2018	Liechtenstein	2–1	(Note: Jake Gosling, Lee Casciaro, Liam Walker and Joseph Chipolina jointly held the record with two goals.)
3	Lee Casciaro	15 October 2019	Georgia	2–3	(Note: Lee Casciaro, Tjay De Barr, Reece Styche and Liam Walker jointly held the record with three goals.)
3	Tjay De Barr	1 September 2021	Latvia	1–3	(Note: Lee Casciaro, Tjay De Barr, Reece Styche and Liam Walker jointly held the record with three goals.)
3	Reece Styche	7 September 2021	Norway	1–5	(Note: Lee Casciaro, Tjay De Barr, Reece Styche and Liam Walker jointly held the record with three goals.)
3	Liam Walker	16 November 2021	Latvia	1–3	(Note: Lee Casciaro, Tjay De Barr, Reece Styche and Liam Walker jointly held the record with three goals.)
4	Liam Walker	9 June 2022	Bulgaria	1–1	(Note: Liam Walker and Roy Chipolina jointly held the record with four goals.)
4	Roy Chipolina	16 November 2022	Liechtenstein	2–0	(Note: Liam Walker and Roy Chipolina jointly held the record with four goals.)
5	Liam Walker	16 November 2022	Liechtenstein	2–0	(Note: Liam Walker and Roy Chipolina jointly hold the record with five goals.)
5	Roy Chipolina	19 November 2022	Andorra	1–0	(Note: Liam Walker and Roy Chipolina jointly hold the record with five goals.)
6	Liam Walker	8 September 2024	Liechtenstein	2–2	
7	Liam Walker	15 November 2024	San Marino	1–1	
8	Liam Walker	19 November 2024	Moldova	1–1	

=== Goalkeepers ===
Rank	Player	Games	Wins	GA	GAA	Career
1	Dayle Coleing	32	3	101	3.156	2019–present
2	Kyle Goldwin	21	4	50	2.381	2018–2021
3	Bradley Banda	17	2	33	1.941	2021–present
4	Jordan Perez	17	1	52	3.059	2013–2016
5	Jamie Robba	8	1	25	3.125	2014–2016
6	Deren Ibrahim	8	0	39	4.875	2016–2017
7	Jaylan Hankins	2	0	2	1	2024–present
8	Matt Cafer	2	0	4	2	2018–2019

=== Disciplinary ===
- Most yellow card: 13, Tjay De Barr, (from 25 March 2018 to 9 June 2025
- Gibraltar player sent off: (8 times)
  - by Jayce Olivero 13 November 2016 v Cyprus (80th minute)
  - by Erin Barnett 31 August 2017 v Belgium (40th minute)
  - by Jayce Olivero 13 November 2021 v Turkey (22nd minute)
  - by Liam Walker 27 March 2023 v Netherlands (51st minute)
  - by Ethan Santos 18 November 2023 v France, (18th minute), UEFA Euro 2024 qualifying, France v Gibraltar football match (UEFA Euro 2024 qualifying)
  - by Dayle Coleing 21 March 2024 v Lithuania (26th minute)
  - by Dan Bent 13 October 2024 v Liechtenstein (93rd minute)
  - by Julian Valarino 8 October 2025 v New Caledonia (92nd minute)
- Longest streak without red cards: 36, from 3 September 2017 to 11 October 2021
- Opponent player sent off: (5 times)
  - by Axel Witsel 31 August 2017 v Belgium (40th minute)
  - by Davide Simoncini 14 November 2020 v San Marino (50th minute)
  - by Andreas Malin 16 November 2022 v Liechtenstein (20th minute)
  - by Edvinas Gertmonas 21 March 2024 v Lithuania (71st minute)
  - by Daniel Danu 19 November 2024 v Moldova (91st minute)
- Longest streak without red cards by a opponent: 25, from 19 November 2013 to 9 June 2017

== Managerial records ==
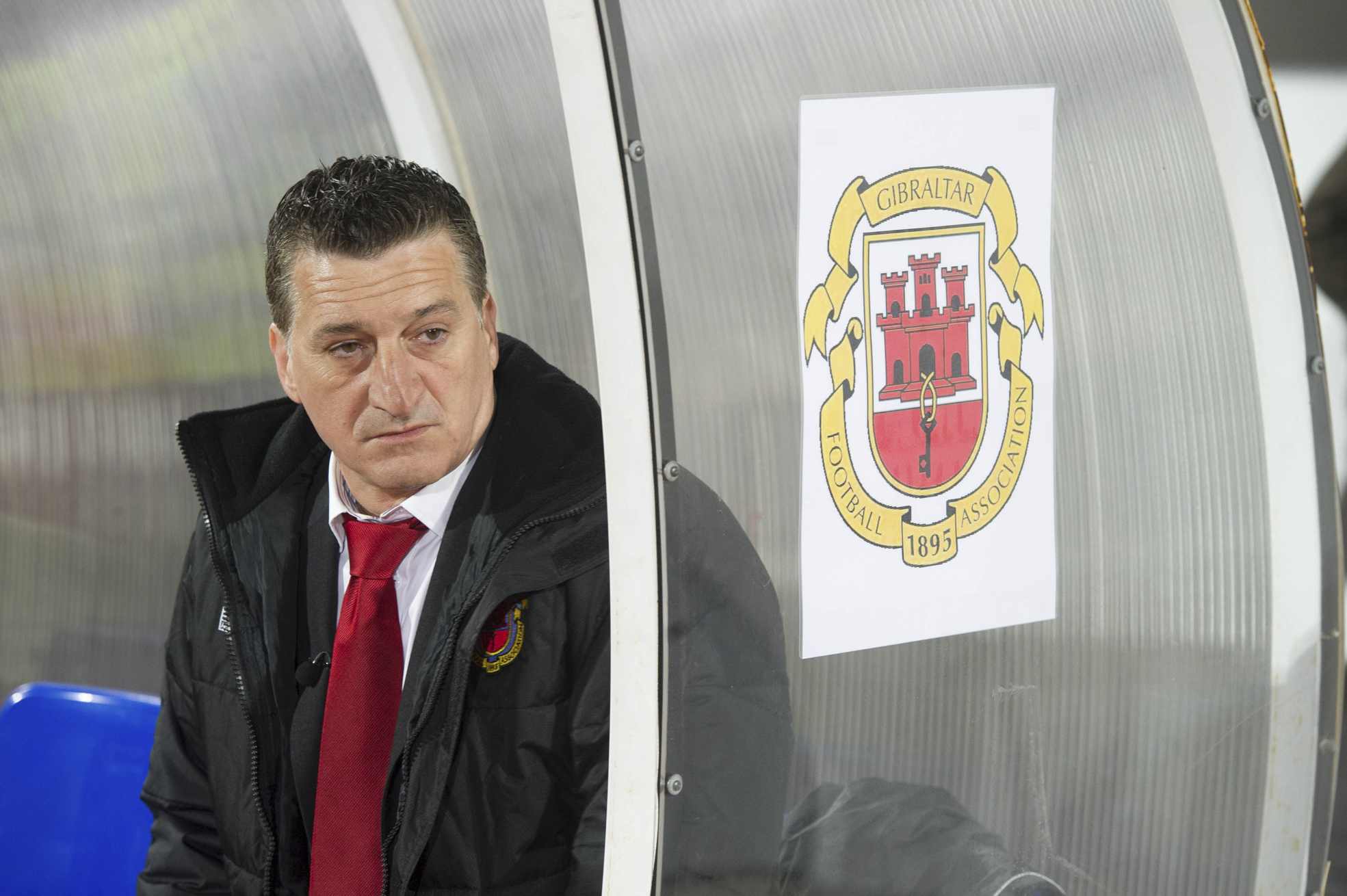
Allen Bula was the head coach of Gibraltar when they joined UEFA; becoming their first official manager.

- First full-time manager: Allen Bula managed Gibraltar from 2010 (before Gibraltar became members of UEFA) to 2014
- Longest-serving manager: Julio César Ribas – 6 years, 242 days (29 June 2018 to 26 February 2025)
- Shortest tenure as manager: David Wilson – 5 months (March to July 2015)
- Highest win percentage: Desi Curry, 100%
- Lowest win percentage: Dave Wilson, Scott Wiseman and Jeff Wood, 0.00%

== Team records ==
=== Matches ===
==== Firsts ====
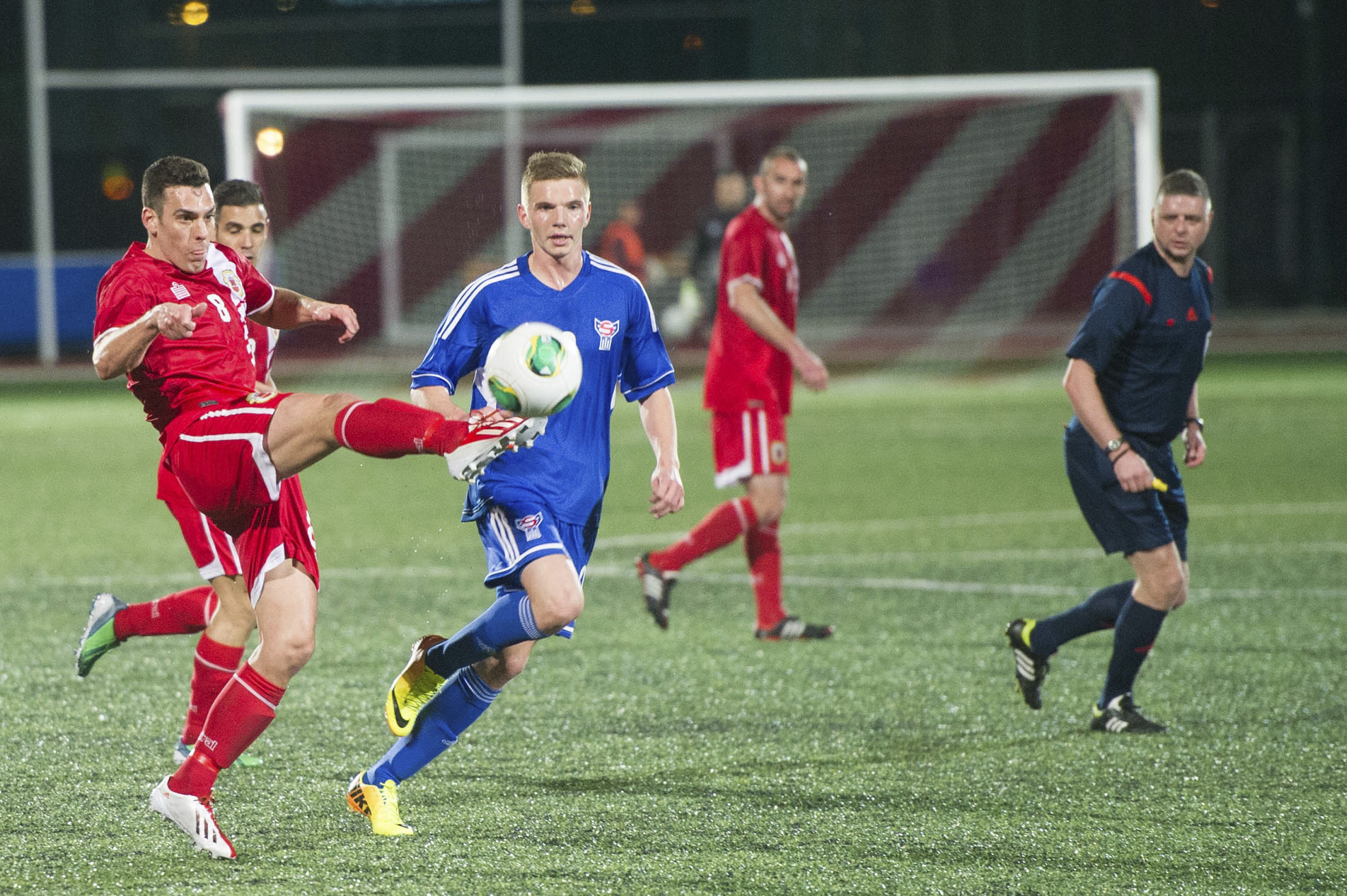
Gibraltar (in red) playing against the Faroe Islands in 2014, their first official match at the Victoria Stadium; during this match Gibraltar scored and conceded their first goals of international football.

- First match (at Estádio Algarve): 0–0 v Slovakia, Friendly, 19 November 2013
- First match at Victoria Stadium: 1–4 v Faroe Islands, Friendly, 1 March 2014
- First match at Europa Point Stadium: 1–0 v Andorra, Friendly, 4 September 2024
- First UEFA European Championship qualifying match: 0–7 v Poland, 7 September 2014
- First FIFA World Cup qualification match: 1–4 v Greece, 6 September 2016
- First UEFA Nations League match: 0–2 v Macedonia, 6 September 2018

==== Record results ====
- Biggest win: 4–0 v British Virgin Islands, Friendly, 3 June 2026
- Biggest defeat: 0–14 v France, UEFA Euro 2024 qualifying, 18 November 2023

=== Record consecutive results ===
- Record consecutive wins:
  - 2, from 13 October 2018 to 16 October 2018
  - 2, from 16 November 2022 to 19 November 2022
  - 2, from 3 June 2026 to 6 June 2026
- Record consecutive defeats: 13, from 24 March 2023 to 2 June 2024
- Record consecutive draws: 3, from 13 October to 19 November 2024
- Record consecutive matches without a defeat: 7, from 6 June 2024 to 19 November 2024
- Record consecutive matches without a win: 24, from 7 September 2014 to 10 October 2017
- Longest goalless streak: 1,332 minutes, from 19 November 2022 to 4 September 2024
- Most consecutive minutes without conceding a goal: 269 minutes, from 10 October 2024 to 15 November 2024
- Longest goalless streak by both teams: 205 minutes, from 16 November 2021 to 2 June 2022
- Longest streak without draw: 33, from 29 March 2016 to 11 November 2020
- Longest streak without goalless draw: 33, from 29 March 2016 to 11 November 2020
- Longest losing streak at FIFA World Cup qualifying: 28, from 6 September 2016 to present
- Longest losing streak at UEFA European Championship qualifying: 26, from 7 September 2014 to present
- Longest losing streak at major qualifying tournament: 54, from 7 September 2014 to present

=== Goals ===
- Most goals scored in a match: 4 - (2 times)
  - 3 June 2026 v British Virgin Islands
  - 6 June 2026 v Cayman Islands
  - 2 goals - (5 times)
  - 16 October 2018 v Liechtenstein, 2018–19 UEFA Nations League D
  - 16 November 2018 v Armenia, 2018–19 UEFA Nations League D
  - 15 October 2019 v Georgia, UEFA Euro 2020 qualifying
  - 16 November 2022 v Liechtenstein, Friendly
  - 8 September 2024 v Liechtenstein, 2024–25 UEFA Nations League D
- Most goals scored in first half: 3: 3 June 2026 v British Virgin Islands
- Most goals scored in second half: 3: 6 June 2026 v Cayman Islands
- Most goals scored by a different player in a match: 3, 6 June 2026 v Cayman Islands
- Most goals conceded in a match: 14, 18 November 2023 v France, UEFA Euro 2024 qualifying
- Most goals conceded in first half: 7, 18 November 2023 v France, UEFA Euro 2024 qualifying, France v Gibraltar football match (UEFA Euro 2024 qualifying)
- Most goals conceded in second half: 7, 18 November 2023 v France, UEFA Euro 2024 qualifying, France v Gibraltar football match (UEFA Euro 2024 qualifying)
- Most goals scored by a different opponent player in a match: 10, 18 November 2023 v France, UEFA Euro 2024 qualifying, France v Gibraltar football match (UEFA Euro 2024 qualifying)
- Most goals scored by both teams in a match: 14, 18 November 2023 v France, UEFA Euro 2024 qualifying
- Fewest goals scored by both teams in a match: 0 - (8 times)
  - 19 November 2013 v Slovakia (Gibraltar first match played)
  - 23 March 2016 v Liechtenstein
  - 14 November 2020 v San Marino
  - 7 June 2021 v Andorra
  - 23 March 2022 v Grenada
  - 26 March 2022 v Faroe Islands
  - 6 June 2024 v Wales
  - 13 October 2024 v Liechtenstein
- Most goals scored in a qualifying tournament: 4 in 10 matches, 2022 FIFA World Cup qualification
- Fewest goals scored in a qualifying tournament: 0 in 8 matches, UEFA Euro 2024 qualifying
- Most goals conceded in a qualifying tournament: 56 in 10 matches, UEFA Euro 2016 qualifying
- Fewest goals conceded in a qualifying tournament: 31 in 8 matches, UEFA Euro 2020 qualifying
- Most goals scored in the UEFA Nations League: 5 in 6 matches, 2018–19 League D
- Fewest goals scored the UEFA Nations League:
  - 3 in 4 matches, 2020–21 League D
  - 3 in 6 matches, 2022–23 League C
- Most goals conceded in the UEFA Nations League: 18 in 6 matches, 2022–23 League C (not including the relegation play-outs)
- Fewest goals conceded in the UEFA Nations League: 1 in 4 matches, 2020–21 League D

=== Points ===
- Most points in a qualifying tournament:
  - 0 in 10 matches, UEFA European Championship qualifying, 2016
  - 0 in 10 matches, FIFA World Cup qualification, 2018
  - 0 in 8 matches, UEFA European Championship qualifying, 2020
  - 0 in 10 matches, FIFA World Cup qualification, 2022
  - 0 in 8 matches, UEFA European Championship qualifying, 2024
- Fewest points in a qualifying tournament:
  - 0 in 10 matches, UEFA European Championship qualifying, 2016
  - 0 in 10 matches, FIFA World Cup qualification, 2018
  - 0 in 8 matches, UEFA European Championship qualifying, 2020
  - 0 in 10 matches, FIFA World Cup qualification, 2022
  - 0 in 8 matches, UEFA European Championship qualifying, 2024
- Most points in the UEFA Nations League: 8 in 3 matches, 2020–21 League D
- Fewest points in the UEFA Nations League: 1 in 6 matches, 2022–23 League C

=== Other records ===
- Fastest 2 goals to start the match: 21st minutes, 16 November 2022 v Liechtenstein
- Fastest 2 goals conceded to start the match: 4th minutes, 18 November 2023 v France, UEFA Euro 2024 qualifying, France v Gibraltar football match (UEFA Euro 2024 qualifying)

== Statistics ==
=== By opponent ===
Opponents	Pld	W	D	L	GF	GA	GD	W%	First	Last
Albania	1	0	0	1	0	1	−1	0.00	2025	2025
Andorra	4	2	2	0	2	0	+2	50.00	2021	2026
Armenia	2	1	0	1	3	6	−3	50.00	2018	2018
Belgium	2	0	0	2	0	15	−15	0.00	2016	2017
Bosnia and Herzegovina	2	0	0	2	0	9	−9	0.00	2017	2017
British Virgin Islands	1	1	0	0	4	0	+4	100.00	2026	2026
Bulgaria	3	0	1	2	2	9	−7	0.00	2020	2022
Cayman Islands	1	1	0	0	4	1	+3	100.00	2026	2026
Croatia	3	0	0	3	0	14	−14	0.00	2015	2025
Cyprus	2	0	0	2	2	5	−3	0.00	2016	2017
Czech Republic	2	0	0	2	0	10	−10	0.00	2025	2025
Denmark	2	0	0	2	0	12	−12	0.00	2019	2019
Estonia	5	0	1	4	1	14	−13	0.00	2014	2019
Faroe Islands	4	0	1	3	2	7	−5	0.00	2014	2025
France	2	0	0	2	0	17	−17	0.00	2023	2023
Georgia	6	0	0	6	3	19	−16	0.00	2014	2022
Germany	2	0	0	2	0	11	−11	0.00	2014	2015
Greece	4	0	0	4	1	16	−15	0.00	2016	2023
Grenada	1	0	1	0	0	0	+0	0.00	2022	2022
Kosovo	1	0	0	1	0	1	−1	0.00	2019	2019
Latvia	6	1	0	5	3	13	−10	16.67	2016	2026
Liechtenstein	9	4	4	1	10	6	+4	44.44	2016	2026
Lithuania	2	0	0	2	0	2	−2	0.00	2024	2024
Malta	4	1	1	2	2	4	−2	25.00	2014	2026
Moldova	1	0	1	0	1	1	+0	0.00	2024	2024
Montenegro	4	0	0	4	3	12	−9	0.00	2021	2025
Netherlands	4	0	0	4	0	22	−22	0.00	2021	2023
New Caledonia	1	0	0	1	0	2	−2	0.00	2025	2025
North Macedonia	4	0	0	4	0	12	−12	0.00	2018	2022
Norway	2	0	0	2	1	8	−7	0.00	2021	2021
Poland	2	0	0	2	1	15	−14	0.00	2014	2015
Portugal	1	0	0	1	0	5	−5	0.00	2016	2016
Republic of Ireland	6	0	0	6	0	21	−21	0.00	2014	2023
San Marino	4	2	2	0	3	1	+2	50.00	2020	2024
São Tomé and Príncipe	1	0	1	0	0	0	+0	0.00	2026	2026
Scotland	3	0	0	3	1	14	−13	0.00	2015	2024
Slovakia	1	0	1	0	0	0	+0	0.00	2013	2013
Slovenia	1	0	0	1	0	6	−6	0.00	2021	2021
Switzerland	2	0	0	2	1	10	−9	0.00	2019	2019
Turkey	2	0	0	2	0	9	−9	0.00	2021	2021
Wales	2	0	1	1	0	4	−4	0.00	2023	2024
Total	112	13	17	82	50	334	−284	11.61	2013	2026

=== By competition ===
Competition	Pld	W	D	L	GF	GA	GD	W%	First	Last
FIFA World Cup qualification	28	0	0	28	10	118	−108	0.00	2016	2025
Friendly	31	7	9	15	15	45	−30	22.58	2013	2026
UEFA Euro qualifying	26	0	0	26	5	128	−123	0.00	2014	2023
UEFA Nations League	27	5	9	13	16	42	−26	18.52	2018	2026
Total	112	12	18	82	46	333	−287	10.71	2013	2026

=== By home stadium ===
Competition	Pld	W	D	L	GF	GA	GD	W%	First	Last
Estádio Algarve	21	1	2	18	3	79	−76	4.76	2013	2025
Europa Point Stadium	11	3	3	5	10	10	+0	27.27	2024	2026
Victoria Stadium	27	5	5	17	17	62	−45	18.52	2014	2022
Total	59	9	10	40	30	151	−121	15.25	2013	2026
