= 2013 Gibraltar v Slovakia football match =

Gibraltar v Slovakia (2013)
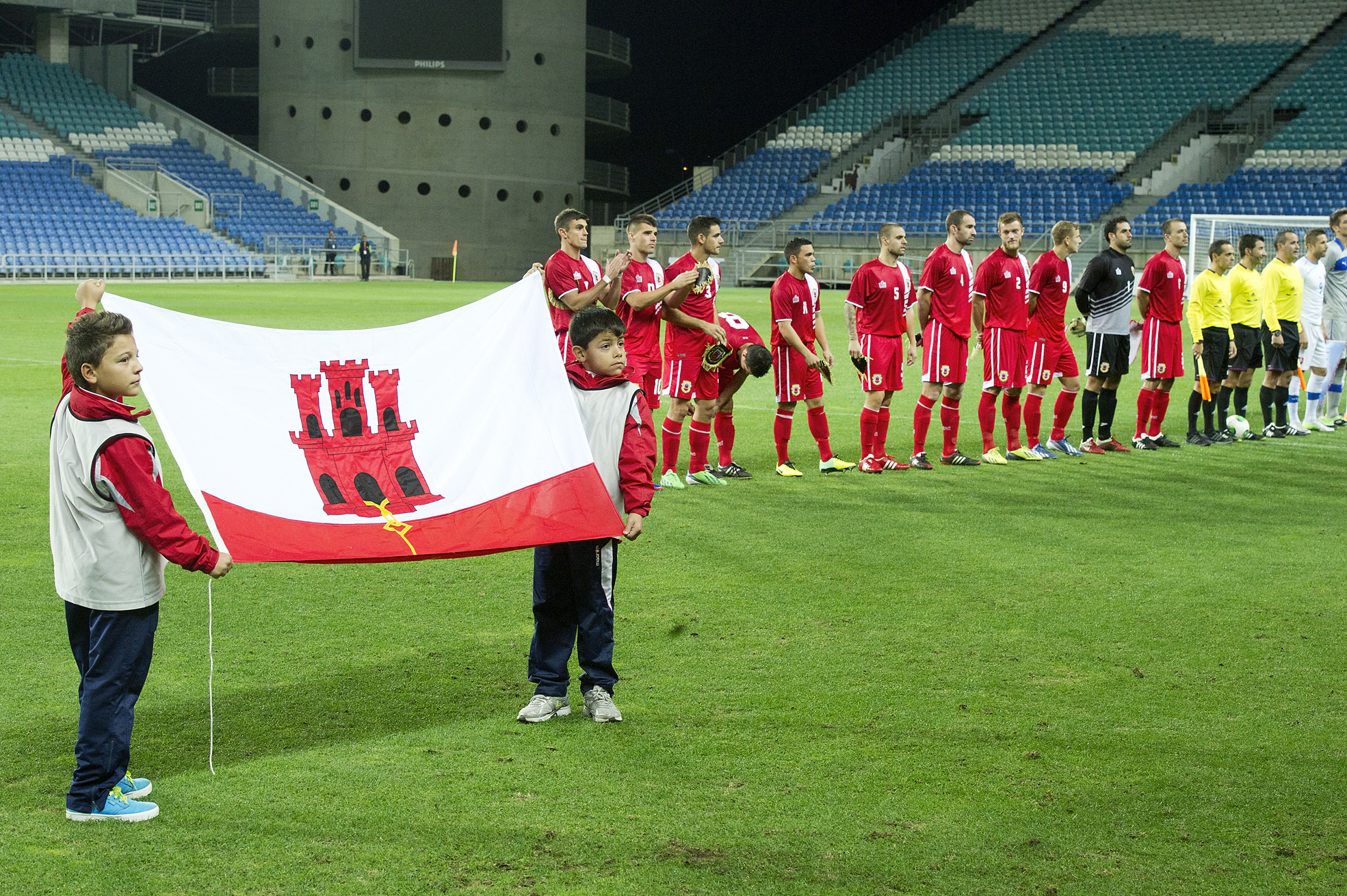
- The teams lining up before the match.
- Event: International friendly
Gibraltar	Slovakia
(Gibraltar)	(Slovakia)
0	0
- Date: 19 November 2013
- Venue: Estádio Algarve, Faro/Loulé
- Man of the Match: Danny Higginbotham
- Referee: Hugo Miguel (Portugal)
- Attendance: 350

The international friendly between the Gibraltar and Slovakia national football teams on 19 November 2013 was the first official match played by Gibraltar after joining the Union of European Football Associations (UEFA). It took place at the Estádio Algarve in Faro/Loulé, Portugal with 350 fans in attendance. The Gibraltar Football Association chose to play at the Estádio Algarve as this would be the stadium the team would use for competitive matches as their only venue the Victoria Stadium was not eligible to. The game ended in a 0–0 draw which was seen as an upset with Slovakia being heavy favourites to defeat UEFA's newest members. Gibraltar defender Danny Higginbotham received the man of the match award.

== Background ==
Gibraltar first applied for UEFA membership in 1997 but was rejected because of intense opposition from Spain due to the disputed status of Gibraltar and that the territory's acceptance would inspire separatist Basque and Catalan national football teams to apply for membership as well. They reapplied unsuccessfully in 2007, with only three member nations supporting their bid after Spain threatened to withdraw Spanish teams from all UEFA competitions. They tried again in October 2012 and were granted full membership in March 2013. The team's first announced match was against Estonia in Tallinn on 5 March 2014, but in October 2013 Slovakia, who had been UEFA members since 1993, were named as Gibraltar's first opponents.

Slovakia began 2013 with a narrow 2–1 away defeat to Belgium. This was followed by two consecutive home draws, 1–1 in a 2014 FIFA World Cup qualification match against Lithuania and 0–0 in a friendly against Sweden. On 7 June 2013 they faced Liechtenstein away in a World Cup qualifier, Martin Büchel gave the host a surprise lead but Ján Ďurica equalised 60 minutes later for Slovakia, despite the late goal the match was considered an upset, co-coaches Stanislav Griga and Michal Hipp were sacked after the match as they had failed to win their last six matches. The Slovak Football Association appointed former Slovakia midfielder Ján Kozák as the new head coach of the national team in July 2013. Kozák's first match was a friendly away to Romania which ended in a 1–1 draw. After Kozák's appointment Slovakia had four remaining World Cup qualifiers: a win, a draw and two losses saw Slovakia finish UEFA Group G in third place and failed to qualify for the 2014 FIFA World Cup. The final match before facing Gibraltar was a friendly against Poland away in Wrocław, first half goals from Juraj Kucka and Róbert Mak gave Slovakia a 2–0 win.

The Victoria Stadium was the only football stadium in Gibraltar at the time but it did not meet UEFA's standards for competitive internationals, so it was agreed they would use the Estádio Algarve in Faro/Loulé, Portugal for competitive matches until Gibraltar had an eligible stadium of their own. Even though the Victoria Stadium is eligible for friendly matches the Gibraltar Football Association decided to play the match against Slovakia at the Estádio Algarve to give them a chance to test the stadium for its future use.

== Match details ==
19 November 2013
18:30 UTC

Gibraltar	0–0	Slovakia
	Report

Estádio Algarve, Faro/Loulé
Attendance: 350
Referee: Hugo Miguel (Portugal)

Gibraltar	Slovakia

GK	1	Jordan Perez
DF	2	Scott Wiseman
DF	3	Joseph Chipolina
DF	4	Danny Higginbotham
DF	5	Ryan Casciaro
DF	6	Roy Chipolina (c)
MF	7	Jeremy Lopez	(substituted off) 46'
MF	8	Daniel Duarte	(substituted off) 56'
MF	10	Liam Walker
MF	11	Robert Guilling	(substituted off) 66'
FW	9	Adam Priestley	(substituted off) 66'
Substitutions:
DF	15	Jack Sergeant	(substituted on) 66'
MF	12	Kyle Casciaro	(substituted on) 56'
MF	16	Julian Bado	(substituted on) 46'
FW	18	Al Greene	(substituted on) 66'
Manager:
Allen Bula

GK	1	Tomáš Košický
DF	2	Lukáš Štetina
DF	16	Kornel Saláta
DF	3	Pavol Farkaš
DF	21	Martin Juhar
MF	9	Stanislav Šesták (c)
MF	22	Viktor Pečovský
MF	8	Karim Guédé
MF	18	Erik Jendrišek	(substituted off) 66'
FW	11	Jakub Sylvestr	(substituted off) 85'
FW	10	David Depetris	(substituted off) 66'
Substitutions:
DF	5	Branislav Niňaj	(substituted on) 85'
MF	7	František Kubík	(substituted on) 66'
FW	15	Adam Zreľák	(substituted on) 66'
Manager:
Ján Kozák

== Post-match ==
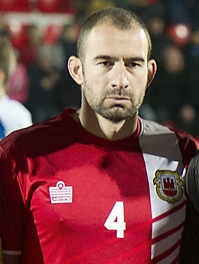
Danny Higginbotham received the man of the match award for his role in the Gibraltar defence.

As Slovakia were heavy favourites for a comfortable win over Gibraltar the draw resulted in opposite feelings for both managers: Gibraltar's Allen Bula said the result was "a dream come true" while Slovakia's Ján Kozák described the result as "a huge disappointment" for him. Defender Danny Higginbotham, who qualifies for Gibraltar via his grandmother, was the recipient of the man of the match award and declared the result as "one of the best" in his career.

The match was the last in 2013 for both teams; Gibraltar's next match was a friendly against the Faroe Islands at the Victoria Stadium in March 2014, the first official match played in Gibraltar since their acceptance into UEFA. They took the lead with a goal from captain Roy Chipolina before going on to lose 4–1. At the time, the result was the largest away win for the Faroes and it was also their joint largest win overall, equalling their 3–0 win over San Marino in 1995. Slovakia's next match was also a friendly, but they were away to Israel; goals from Martin Jakubko, Ján Ďurica and Róbert Mak ensured a 3–1 win for Slovakia.

In 2014 Gibraltar gained their second draw and first win, 1–1 against Estonia and 1–0 against Malta — they lost the other six matches. That same year they took part in their first major international competition entering the qualifying rounds for UEFA Euro 2016. Slovakia would go through 2014 winning eight of the nine fixtures they played, losing the other 0–1 to Russia; they began their sixth qualifying campaign for the UEFA European Championship the same year. Slovakia were able to qualify for the main tournament as runners-up of Group C while Gibraltar finished bottom of Group D without a point and failed to qualify.

== See also ==
- List of first association football internationals per country: 1962–present
- Gibraltar national football team results
- Slovakia national football team results
