= Casciaro =

Casciaro is a surname. Notable people with the surname include:

- Giuseppe Casciaro (1861–1941), Italian painter
- Kyle Casciaro (born 1987), Gibraltarian footballer
- Lee Casciaro (born 1981), Gibraltarian footballer
- Ryan Casciaro (born 1984), Gibraltarian footballer
