= Adam Priestley =

Gibraltarian footballer (born 1990)

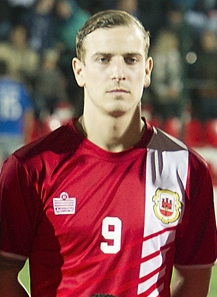
- Priestley lining up for Gibraltar in 2014

Personal information
- Full name: Adam James Priestley
- Date of birth: 14 August 1990 (age 36)
- Place of birth: Gibraltar
- Position: Forward

Youth career
- –1998: Leeds United
- 2003–2006: York City
- 2006–2010: Sherburn White Rose

Senior career*
Years	Team	Apps	(Gls)
2010–2012	Garforth Town	77	(26)
2012–2013	Farsley	39	(21)
2013	Guiseley	8	(0)
2013–2015	Farsley	56	(22)
2015	Shaw Lane	25	(11)
2016–2017	Alfreton Town	20	(1)
2017	→ Frickley Athletic (loan)	5	(2)
2017	Farsley Celtic	20	(4)
2017–2018	Ossett Albion	23	(15)
2018–2019	Ossett United	37	(12)
2019	Garforth Town	9	(3)
2019–2022	Yorkshire Amateur	64	(18)
2022–2023	Pontefract Collieries	42	(21)
2023–2024	Albion Sports	6	(1)
2024	Ossett United	15	(6)
2024–2025	Knaresborough Town	32	(17)

International career^{‡}
2013–2020	Gibraltar	18	(1)
- * Club domestic league appearances and goals as of 18:56, 15 March 2025 (UTC) ‡ National team caps and goals as of 21:57, 14 November 2020 (UTC)

Adam James Priestley (born 14 August 1990) is a Gibraltarian retired former footballer who last played for English club Knaresborough Town of the Northern Counties East League Premier Division, and represented the Gibraltar national team as a forward. After beginning his career in the academies of league clubs Leeds United and York City, Priestley has spent his entire senior career in the semi-professional lower divisions of the English football league system. Qualifying to represent Gibraltar internationally by being born there while his father served in the Royal Air Force, Priestley debuted for the overseas territory in its premier UEFA match in November 2013. He has since gone on to represent Gibraltar in friendlies and UEFA Euro 2016 qualifying.

== Club career ==
=== Youth and amateur ===
Priestley began his career in the academy of Leeds United at age 8 but was released when he admittedly, "[...]wasn't good enough to reach the required standard they were looking for." At age 13, Priestley played in the academy of York City but was told that he was no better or worse than anyone already on the squad and that he would be released. Priestley then joined amateur side Sherburn White Rose FC where he played between 2006 and 2010. For the 2008–09 season, Priestley scored 16 goals (13 league, three cup) in 33 matches (28 league, five cup) as the club finished sixth in the league. The next season, 2009–10, Priestley scored 31 goals (22 league, nine cup) in 31 appearances (25 league, six cup) for Sherburn as the club finished second in the league, only behind Bardsley. With Sherburn, Priestley advanced to the final of the 2010 West Yorkshire League Cup against Beeston St Anthony's after Priestley netted a brace in extra time in a 4–1 victory over Pool in the semi-final. Sherburn went on to win the cup with a 1–0 victory on 6 May 2010 with Priestley starting the match.

=== Garforth Town ===
From 2010 to 2012, Priestley played for Garforth Town, scoring 23 goals (14 league, nine cup) in 54 matches (44 league, 10 cup) for the 2010–11 season and 19 goals (12 league, seven cup) in 43 matches (33 league, 10 cup) for the 2011–12 season. Following a successful first year with Garforth which included an opening seven goals in three matches, including four in a President's Cup tie at Sheffield, it was announced on 8 June 2011 that Priestley had signed a new contract with the club. His 19 and 23-goal seasons made him Garforth's top scorer in back-to-back seasons, despite being placed on the long-term injury list in 2012 because of a knee injury suffered on artificial turf. During the 2011–12 season, Garforth finished in the play-offs which was also Garforth's highest ever finish. In Garforth's last match of the season, Priestley scored the game-winning goal of a 2–1 victory over Skelmersdale United which secured the team's place in the play-offs. Garforth eventually lost to Curzon Ashton which ultimately ended the team's chances of promotion. In total, Priestley made 97 appearances and scored 42 goals for the club, possibly putting him inside the club's top-ten all-time scorers. Priestley's time with Garforth has been called one of the club's greatest eras. In August 2014, Priestley was invited to a legends game involving some of Garforth's most successful former players as part of the club's 50th anniversary celebrations.

=== Farsley ===
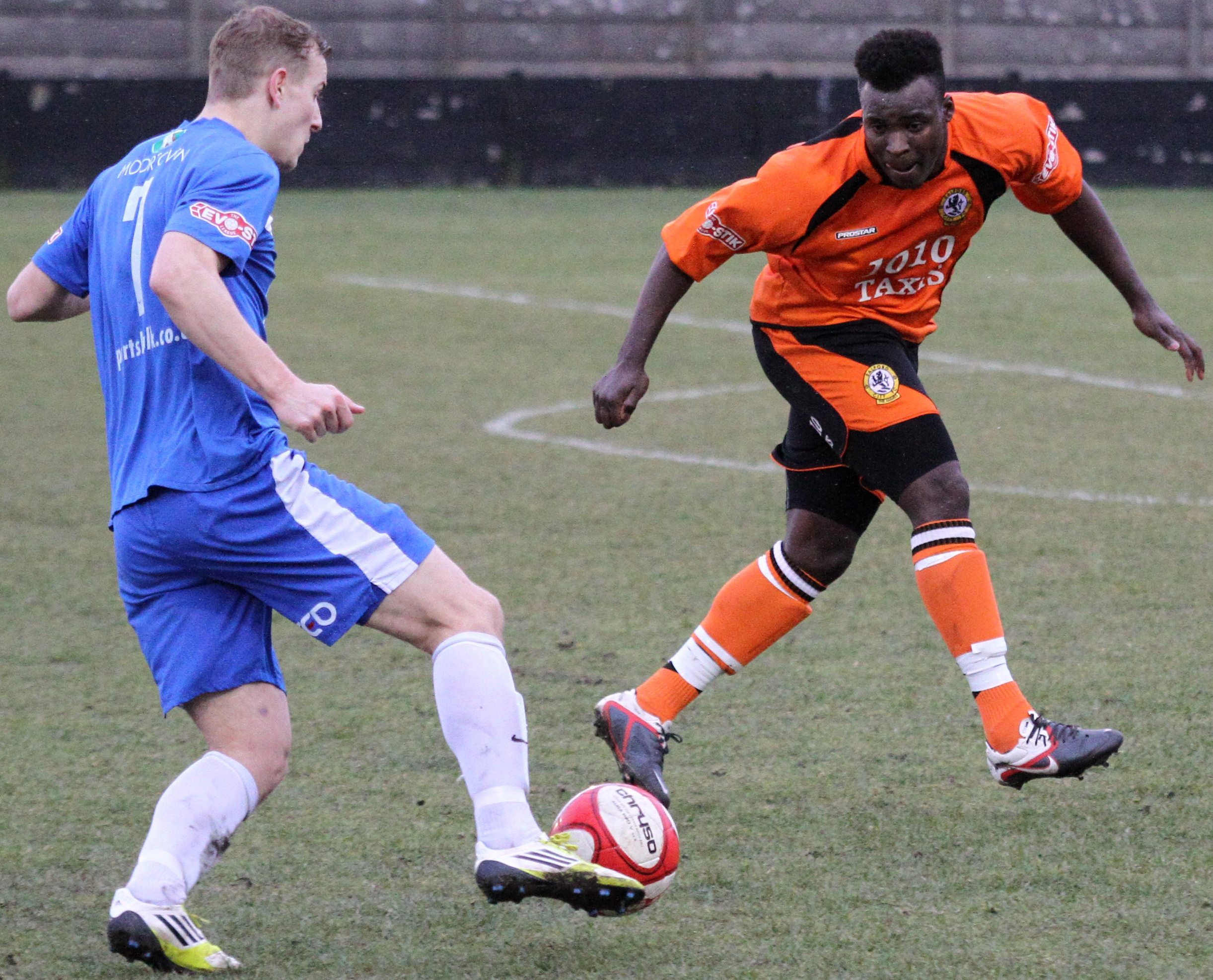
Priestley (left) playing for Farsley in 2013

After the 2011–12 season, Priestley signed for Farsley as part of a player exodus caused by a poor financial situation at Garforth. On 18 August 2012, Priestley scored in his competitive debut for Farsley, an eventual 1–1 league draw with Lancaster City. In total, during his first season with Farsley, Priestley scored 27 goals, including 21 league goals in 39 league matches, and attracted interest from clubs higher up the league system including FC Halifax Town and Hyde. In February 2013, Priestley was offered a much more lucrative contract by Worksop Town of the Northern Premier League Premier Division higher up in the National League System. After the player rejected the initial offer, Worksop countered with another offer which was also rejected in favor of staying at Farsley for the remainder of the season. His 27-goal tally was enough to earn him the Players' Player of the Year and Manager's Player of the Year awards as well as being the team's top goal scorer.

=== Guiseley ===
On 1 August 2013, it was announced that Priestley signed for Guiseley of Conference North higher up in the league system ahead of the 2013–14 season. When manager Steve Kittrick left Guiseley after a poor start to the season, Priestley fell out of favor with new boss Mark Bower which in part prompted the player to leave the club. After making only eight appearances for the club and not scoring a goal, he left Guiseley and returned to Farsley in October 2013. Although he did not score a league goal for Guiseley, he did score for the club in a pre-season friendly against Brighouse Town F.C. in July 2013, one of four friendlies in which Priestley appeared for the club.

=== Return to Farsley ===
On 8 October 2013, Priestley resumed his scoring for Farsley by scoring in his second appearance back with the club against Goole. After finishing the season with 13 goals in 32 appearances, including 9 goals in 26 league appearances, Priestley finished the 2013–14 season by coming in third place in the Supporter's Player of the Year vote.

On 21 June 2014, it was announced that Priestley had signed a new contract and would return to Farsley for the 2014–15 season. In Farsley's first preseason match of the 2014–15 season, Priestley assisted on the game-winning goal of a 1–0 victory over Barnoldswick Town. In Farsley's next preseason match, Priestley scored a first-half brace in an eventual 4–0 victory over Glasshoughton Welfare. In the first match of the regular season, Farsley were defeated 3–0 by Lancaster City with Priestley coming on as a 53rd-minute substitute. Although his addition was noted as strengthening the attack and prompted several scoring chances, he was unable to add to Farsley's tally. Three days later, Priestley scored his first goal of the season, the game winner in a 2–1 victory over Ossett Town with only minutes remaining. Earlier in the match Priestley earned the penalty kick which was converted by Aaron Hardy for Farsley's first goal after Priestley was taken down in the box by the Ossett Town goalkeeper. To begin Farsley's 2014–15 FA Cup qualifying campaign, Priestley scored his club's fourth goal in a 4–1 victory over Athersley Recreation on 30 August 2014 after coming on as a 76th-minute substitute for Marcus Edwards. The victory propelled Farsley to their first FA Cup first qualifying round appearance in two years. Additionally, Priestley's goal came off his last touch before leaving to join the Gibraltar national team in Portugal for a Euro qualifying match against Poland. In Priestley's first two matches back with Farsley following Gibraltar's Euro qualifying match against Germany in November 2014, Priestley scored four goals in league two matches, including his first hat trick of the season on 22 November against Burscough. In January 2015 Priestley was once again offered a move away from Farsley by an unnamed club but rejected the offer stating, "At this time I don't want to be playing anywhere else. I've had a good run in the team and the management have been supportive throughout. Hopefully I can repay everyone with continuing to score the goals to get Farsley where they want to be." Priestley ended the 2014–2015 season with 14 goals in 33 league appearances and 7 goals in 10 cup matches. Farsley went on to lose 2–3 on penalties to Warrington Town in the Doodson Sport Cup final. Priestley came on as a 65th-minute substitute in the match and netted his penalty kick to make it 2–2. During the yearly awards presentation, Priestley came in third place in the Supporters Club Player of the Year voting.

=== Shaw Lane ===
On 19 May 2015, Priestley announced that he was leaving Farsley. The following day, he signed a contract with Shaw Lane Aquaforce of the Northern Premier League Division One South, despite interest from other clubs. Farsley management later admitted that Shaw Lane offered Priestley terms that the team simply could not match. About leaving Farsley, in an interview with Gibraltar media, Priestley stated, "It was a tough decision to leave Farsley as I love the club and have had 3 great years there but I felt the time was right to move on and find a new challenge." On joining Shaw Lane, he stated, "It's a new club and it is an up-and-coming team with high ambitions. They have enjoyed successive promotions so I think that tells you what they want to achieve. We are looking to push towards the playoff places if not the league next season. We're a new team in a new league, but as I said, the ambitions are high and that's our aim." Priestley played his first match for his new club on 17 July 2015 in a friendly against Penistone Church. In the match, Priestley scored his first two goals for the club as Shaw Lane earned the 4–1 victory. In Shaw Lane's next preseason friendly, Priestley scored on his home debut against reigning FA Trophy holders North Ferriby United as the team drew 1–1 in the club's first-ever home friendly. On 15 August 2015, Priestley made his league debut for the club in its opening match of the season, scoring the second goal of a 2–1 victory over Tividale after coming in as a second-half substitute. Priestley finished his first season with the club with 11 league goals as Shaw Lane finished second in the division and were defeated 1–3 in the playoff final against Coalville Town FC, denying the club its fifth-straight promotion. Following the season, Aquaforce was forced to change its name because of league sponsorship regulations with the club announcing that it was adopting the name Barnsley Town FC from the 2016 season forward. However, other issues arose such as name-change deadlines and legal disputes with Barnsley F.C. which left the club's new identity still in question.

=== Alfreton Town ===
After just one season at Shaw Lane, it was announced on 5 August 2016 that Priestley had signed for Alfreton Town of the National League North. He had previously been training with and playing for the club throughout the summer, including in a pre-season match against League Two side Mansfield Town in which he scored his side's only goal of the 1–1 draw. He also appeared for the club in a pre-season 3–3 draw with Nottingham Forest. Only a day after his signing was announced, Priestley was not part of Alferton Town's roster for the opening league match of the season, a 3–4 defeat to Stockport County. After not appearing on Alfreton's matchday roster for the first four games of the season because of an ankle injury, Priestley made his debut on 20 August 2016 as a 90th-minute substitute in a 3–5 defeat to AFC Fylde. He scored his first league goal for the club on 24 September 2016 in an eventual 3–3 draw with Kidderminster Harriers. On 15 November 2016 Priestley scored against Newport County of League Two in the first round of the 2016–17 FA Cup. Priestley's goal forced the match into extra time but Alfreton Town ultimately lost after conceding three goals in the extra period.

==== Frickley Athletic F.C. ====
On 17 February 2017 it was announced that Priestley joined Frickley Athletic F.C. on an initial 1-month loan. Frickley signed the player despite stiff competition for the player from other clubs. He made his debut for the club on 18 February a day after the loan was announced in a league match against Rushall Olympic FC. Priestley scored the only goal of the match on his debut to give Frickley the 1–0 victory. On 17 March 2017 it was announced, that the loan deal would be extended until the middle of April. However, Alferton announced on 13 April 2017, that they had early recalled him.

=== Return to Farsley ===
In June 2017 it was announced that Priestley had signed for Farsley Celtic F.C. for the 2017/18 Northern Premier League Premier Division season. It would be his third spell with the club.

=== Ossett and Garforth ===
However, on 9 December it was announced that he had left Farsley to join Ossett Albion. He then moved to Ossett's new team, Ossett United, in the summer of 2018. However, after one season in which he scored 12 goals in 37 games, helping Ossett to the playoffs, he left the club to rejoin Garforth Town on 22 June 2019. However, he left the club on 19 October.

== International career ==
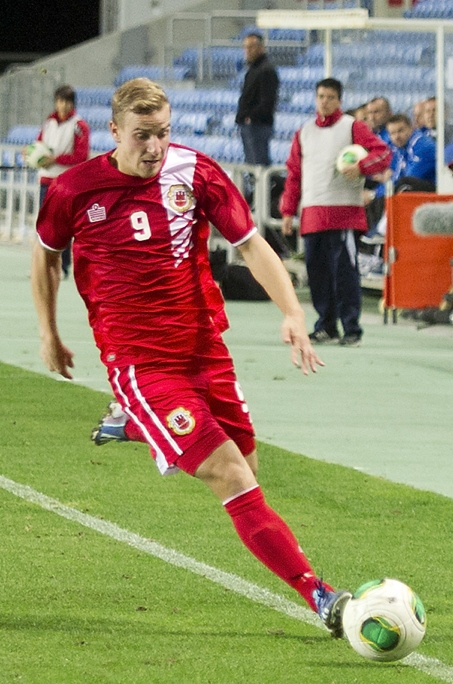
Priestley playing for Gibraltar in 2013

Priestley qualifies to represent Gibraltar having been born there while his father, Adrian, was serving in the Royal Air Force. Priestley moved back to England at the age of one or two. Although he was aware of his link to Gibraltar, Priestley stated that international football never crossed his mind because Gibraltar had not previously been a member of UEFA. Priestley made his debut for Gibraltar in a friendly on 3 July 2013 against Scottish Premiership club Hibernian after he was contacted to train with the national squad by head coach Allen Bula before Gibraltar became UEFA members. Priestley later revealed that a sports blogger from Gibraltar tweeted him after he discovered that Priestley was born in Gibraltar and gave him the contact information for someone at the Gibraltar Football Association. After Gibraltar was accepted as a full UEFA member on 24 May 2013, Priestley was one of the first eligible players to agree to represent Gibraltar following a search by the Gibraltar Football Association as they began preparations for UEFA Euro 2016 qualifying, along with former Premier League and Manchester United defender Danny Higginbotham and Bromley's Anthony Bardon.

After Gibraltar was accepted as a member of UEFA, Priestley was one of only three foreign-based players selected as part of the 23-man squad for Gibraltar's official debut against Slovakia on 19 November 2013. Priestley made his international debut in the match, a start in the eventual 0–0 draw. Priestley created the best offensive chance for Gibraltar in the match, making a surging run down the flank and sending in a cross only to have the ball deflected into the hands of Slovakia goalkeeper Tomas Kosicky in the 10th minute.

Priestley was then called up for Gibraltar's next two friendlies against the Faroe Islands and Estonia on 1 March 2014 and 5 March 2014, respectively. Against the Faroe Islands, Priestley came off the bench as a second-half substitute as head coach Allen Bula gave new striker Reece Styche an opportunity to start. The addition of Priestley at the half was noted for strengthening the Gibraltar attack, despite not changing the scoreline in the 1–4 defeat. For the match against Estonia, Bula once again chose Priestley as his starting forward.

In May 2014, Priestley was once again named to the Gibraltar squad for matches against Estonia and Malta in preparation for UEFA Euro 2016 qualifying. In the match against Estonia, Priestley started the match and played the first 45 minutes of what was Gibraltar's first-ever away fixture as a member of UEFA before being substituted for John-Paul Duarte in the second half. Against Malta, Gibraltar earned their first UEFA victory with the 1–0 result. In the match, Priestley came on as a second-half substitute.

When Gibraltar's 21-man roster for its first UEFA Euro 2016 qualifying match against Poland on 7 September 2014 was officially released on 11 August 2014, Priestley was one of five strikers named to the squad. Priestley made his competitive debut for Gibraltar in the match against Poland, coming on as a 62nd-minute substitute for Kyle Casciaro in the 0–7 defeat. Priestley was then called up for Gibraltar's next two qualifiers against Georgia and Ireland. As of June 2015, Priestley has been called up for all six qualification matches and made appearances in five of them. He was left on the bench for only Gibraltar's match against the Republic of Ireland on 11 October 2014

When Jeff Woods took over as manager of Gibraltar, he did not include Priestley in Gibraltar's squad for qualifiers against the Republic of Ireland and Poland in September 2015. Wood cited a lack of fitness caused by his club only training twice per week as reason for the omission, but stated Priestley would be in contention when the next squad was chosen. Gibraltar sports columnists described the player as the squad's, "main casualty."

Priestley was not part of the national team again until he was recalled for Gibraltar's 2018 FIFA World Cup qualification matches again Estonia and Belgium in October 2016. Priestley made his World Cup qualification debut in the first match against Estonia on 7 October 2016, starting the match before being substituted for Jamie Coombes in the second half of the eventual 0–4 defeat. His participation in the Gibraltar national team ultimately earned his old club, then-eighth tier Farsley Celtic, €25,283 (£21,531) in UEFA compensation, more than many Football League clubs were granted.

=== International goals ===
Scores and results list Gibraltar's goal tally first.

No	Date	Venue	Opponent	Score	Result	Competition
1	16 November 2018	Victoria Stadium, Gibraltar	Armenia	2–5	2–6	2018–19 UEFA Nations League D
Last updated 16 November 2018

=== International career statistics ===
As of match played 14 November 2020.

Gibraltar national team
Year	Apps	Goals
2013	1	0
2014	7	0
2015	3	0
2016	2	0
2017	0	0
2018	2	1
2019	2	0
2020	1	0
Total	18	1

== Personal life ==
Adam Priestley attended Selby College and Leeds Metropolitan University where he earned a BSc (Hons) in Sports Performance in 2010. Priestley has been employed as a teacher at the Ruth Gorse Academy in Leeds.
