= George Cabrera =

Gibraltarian footballer

Personal information
- Full name: George Cabrera
- Date of birth: 14 December 1988 (age 37)
- Place of birth: Gibraltar
- Height: 1.70 m (5 ft 7 in)
- Position: Forward

Team information
- Current team: College 1975
- Number: 20

Youth career
- Atlético Zabal

Senior career*
Years	Team	Apps	(Gls)
2007–2008	Atlético Sanluqueño	0	(0)
2008–2012	Algeciras	106	(30)
2012–2013	Lincoln Red Imps (Note: Pre-UEFA. Lincoln stats before 2013 are unknown)	–	(–)
2013–2021	Lincoln Red Imps	87	(63)
2021–2022	Bruno's Magpies	3	(1)
2022–2023	Lynx	7	(1)
2023	Mons Calpe	4	(1)
2024–	College 1975	3	(0)

International career^{‡}
2014–2018	Gibraltar	8	(1)
- * Club domestic league appearances and goals as of 24 February 2024 ‡ National team caps and goals as of 16 October 2018

George Cabrera (born 14 December 1988) is a Gibraltarian footballer who plays for Gibraltar Football League side College 1975 and the Gibraltar national team, where he plays as a striker.

== International career ==
Cabrera was first called up to the Gibraltar senior team in February 2014 for friendlies against Faroe Islands and Estonia on 1 and 5 March 2014. He made his international début with Gibraltar on 26 May 2014 in a 1–1 home draw against Estonia, when he substituted Kyle Casciaro in the 83rd minute. His second appearance came in a 1–0 home victory over Malta on 4 June 2014.

On 16 October 2018, Cabrera scored the equaliser as Gibraltar came from behind to beat Liechtenstein 2–1. This was his first goal for his country.

=== International goals ===
Scores and results list Gibraltar's goal tally first.

#	Date	Venue	Opponent	Score	Result	Competition
1	16 October 2018	Victoria Stadium, Gibraltar	Liechtenstein	1–1	2–1	2018–19 UEFA Nations League D

== Personal life ==
On Christmas Day 2023, he had been accused of sending messages described as "menacing" to one victim over a space of 1.5 hours. Some of these messages were read out to court ("Open or I break", "It's gonna be bad", "You want trouble" & "I'm killing that guy"). He pleaded guilty to the charge. He also previously stood trial for similar offences in 2023, in which he was found not guilty by a jury.

When he was initially charged, the court heard that he had engaged in controlling and coercive behaviour to the complainant several months before the incident took place in February 2024, in which he was said to have attacked the woman and prevented her from leaving a house

On the morning of 13 January 2025, he was issued Not Guilty verdicts for the charges by the Puisne Judge Liam Yeats, after the Crown told the court it hadn't offered any evidence regarding the player.

The judge said that the given time Cabrera served on remand, he would no longer issue any further penalty for the abusive messages, giving out the quote "You're free to go".
