= Reece Styche =

Gibraltar international footballer

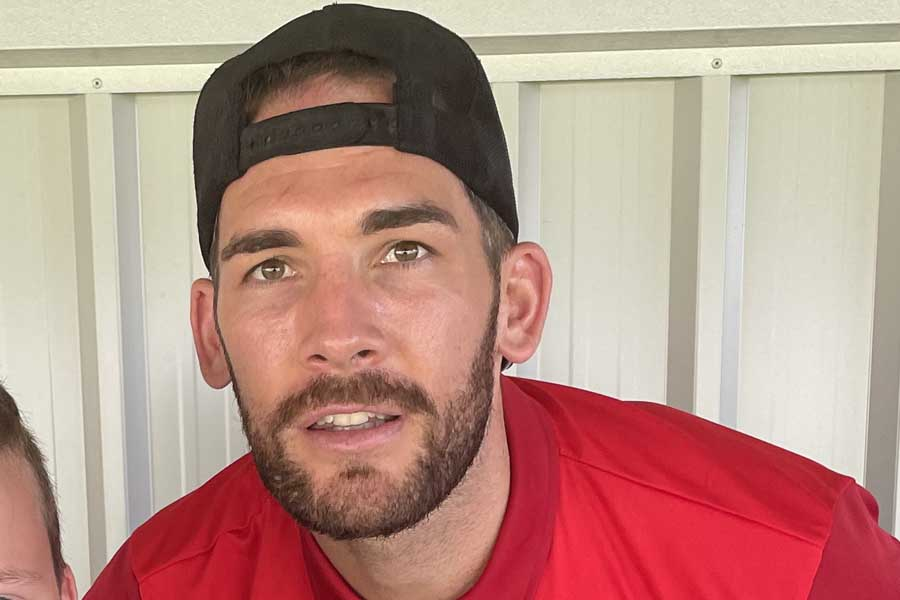
- Styche in 2022

Personal information
- Full name: Reece Styche
- Date of birth: 3 May 1989 (age 37)
- Place of birth: Sutton Coldfield, England
- Height: 6 ft 1 in (1.85 m)
- Position: Forward

Team information
- Current team: Banbury United

Senior career*
| Years | Team | Apps | (Gls) |
| 2006–2008 | Hednesford Town | 7 | (2) |
| 2008 | → Bromsgrove Rovers (loan) | 3 | (1) |
| 2008–2009 | Grantham Town | 6 | (2) |
| 2009 | Coalville Town | 12 | (1) |
| 2009 | Shepshed Dynamo | 7 | (1) |
| 2009–2010 | Chasetown | 13 | (10) |
| 2010–2014 | Forest Green Rovers | 107 | (35) |
| 2014 | → Wycombe Wanderers (loan) | 14 | (0) |
| 2014–2016 | Kidderminster Harriers | 36 | (6) |
| 2014 | → Tamworth (loan) | 5 | (2) |
| 2015 | → Tamworth (loan) | 15 | (4) |
| 2015–2016 | → Macclesfield Town (loan) | 3 | (0) |
| 2016 | Macclesfield Town | 12 | (4) |
| 2016–2017 | Gateshead | 17 | (2) |
| 2016–2017 | → Nuneaton Town (loan) | 5 | (1) |
| 2017 | Tamworth | 27 | (13) |
| 2017–2018 | Darlington | 31 | (16) |
| 2018–2019 | Alfreton Town | 22 | (11) |
| 2019–2020 | Hereford | 22 | (3) |
| 2020 | Bromsgrove Sporting | 1 | (0) |
| 2020–2021 | Buxton | 7 | (1) |
| 2021 | Hednesford Town | 6 | (1) |
| 2021–2023 | Stourbridge | 53 | (19) |
| 2023 | Matlock Town | 11 | (3) |
| 2023–2024 | AFC Telford United | 27 | (8) |
| 2024 | Stratford Town | 6 | (1) |
| 2024–2025 | AFC Telford United | 18 | (2) |
| 2025 | Bromsgrove Sporting | 11 | (1) |
| 2025– | Banbury United | 11 | (6) |

International career
| 2011 | England C | 1 | (0) |
| 2014–2023 | Gibraltar | 31 | (3) |
- * Club domestic league appearances and goals as of 16:48, 21 October 2025 (UTC)

Reece Styche (born 3 May 1989) is a professional footballer who plays as a forward for Southern Premier Central side Banbury United. Known as a physical attacker, he is also known as "Brutus" by fans in Gibraltar after the nickname was given to him by head coach Julio Cesar Ribas.

== Club career ==
=== Early career ===
Born in Sutton Coldfield, West Midlands, Styche came through the youth system at Hednesford Town and made his debut for the club on 28 April 2007, coming off the bench and scoring twice in a 3–2 away win over Kendal Town. A number of injury problems hampered his progress and he spent a month on loan at Bromsgrove Rovers in September 2008. He made four substitute appearances, three in the Southern League Midland Division and one in the Birmingham Senior Cup, and scored once, against AFC Sudbury.

After two substitute appearances for Hednesford, he joined Grantham Town permanently after a short trial period. Four months later he left Grantham and joined Coalville Town in February 2009. He ended the 2008–09 season with Coalville but then signed for Shepshed Dynamo.

In October 2009, he joined Northern Premier League Division One South club Chasetown. He scored on his debut after just three minutes of an FA Trophy victory over Lincoln United. His goalscoring success with the Scholars saw him find the back of the net 13 times in 15 appearances – 10 from 13 league matches – and would earn him a move away from the club as a result.

=== Forest Green Rovers ===
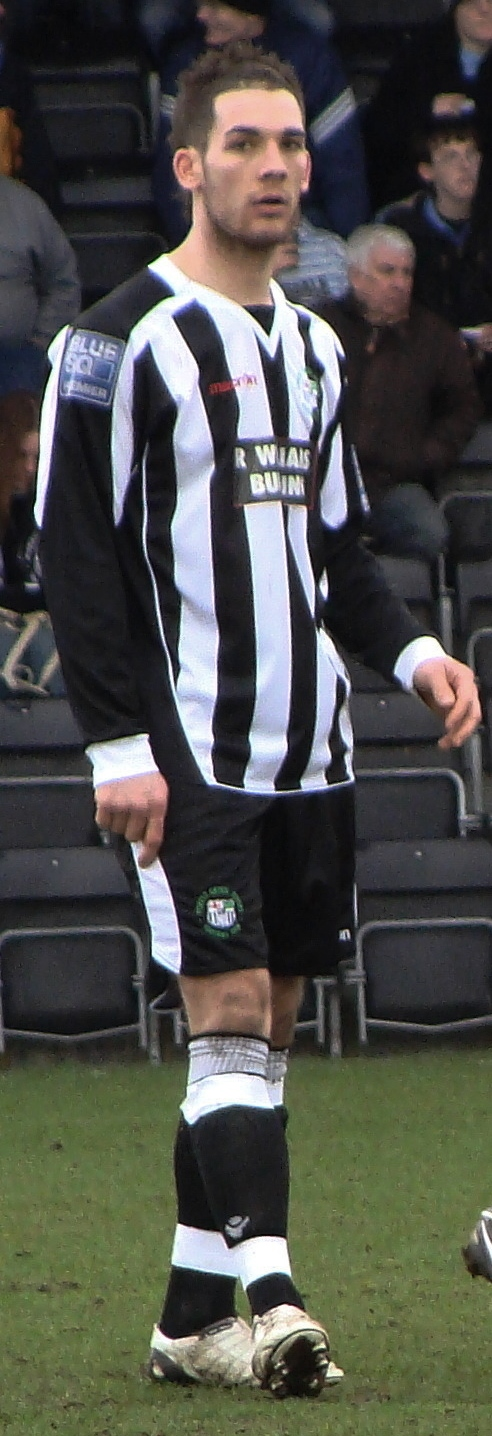
Styche playing for Forest Green Rovers in 2011

On 25 January 2010, Styche joined Conference Premier club Forest Green Rovers. He made his debut the next day, scoring twice in a 3–2 away win over Hayes & Yeading United after coming on as a substitute for Craig Rocastle. In May 2010, he agreed a new contract to stay with the club for the 2010–11 season. He ended the 2010–11 campaign as the club's top goal scorer with 16 goals. His fine goalscoring form earned him a call-up to the England C squad for the final of the International Challenge Trophy against the Portugal under-23 team. He appeared as a substitute in the final at Sixfields Stadium but couldn't prevent England C from suffering a 1–0 defeat.

In August 2011, he was the subject of a bid from league rivals Luton Town which was rejected by Forest Green, and he signed a new three-year contract with the club. In October 2011, having scored six times in nine appearances, he suffered a knee injury which was expected to rule him out for much of the season. He returned to first-team action towards the end of the campaign, and began the 2012–13 season with a first goal against AFC Telford United, albeit awarded as an own goal, followed by a last-minute penalty at Gateshead which secured a 1–1 draw.

In February 2013, he suffered a ruptured anterior cruciate ligament which required surgery. He returned from injury in October, and scored his first goal of the 2013–14 season in a 6–2 away win over Hyde on 18 January 2014.

=== Wycombe Wanderers (loan) ===
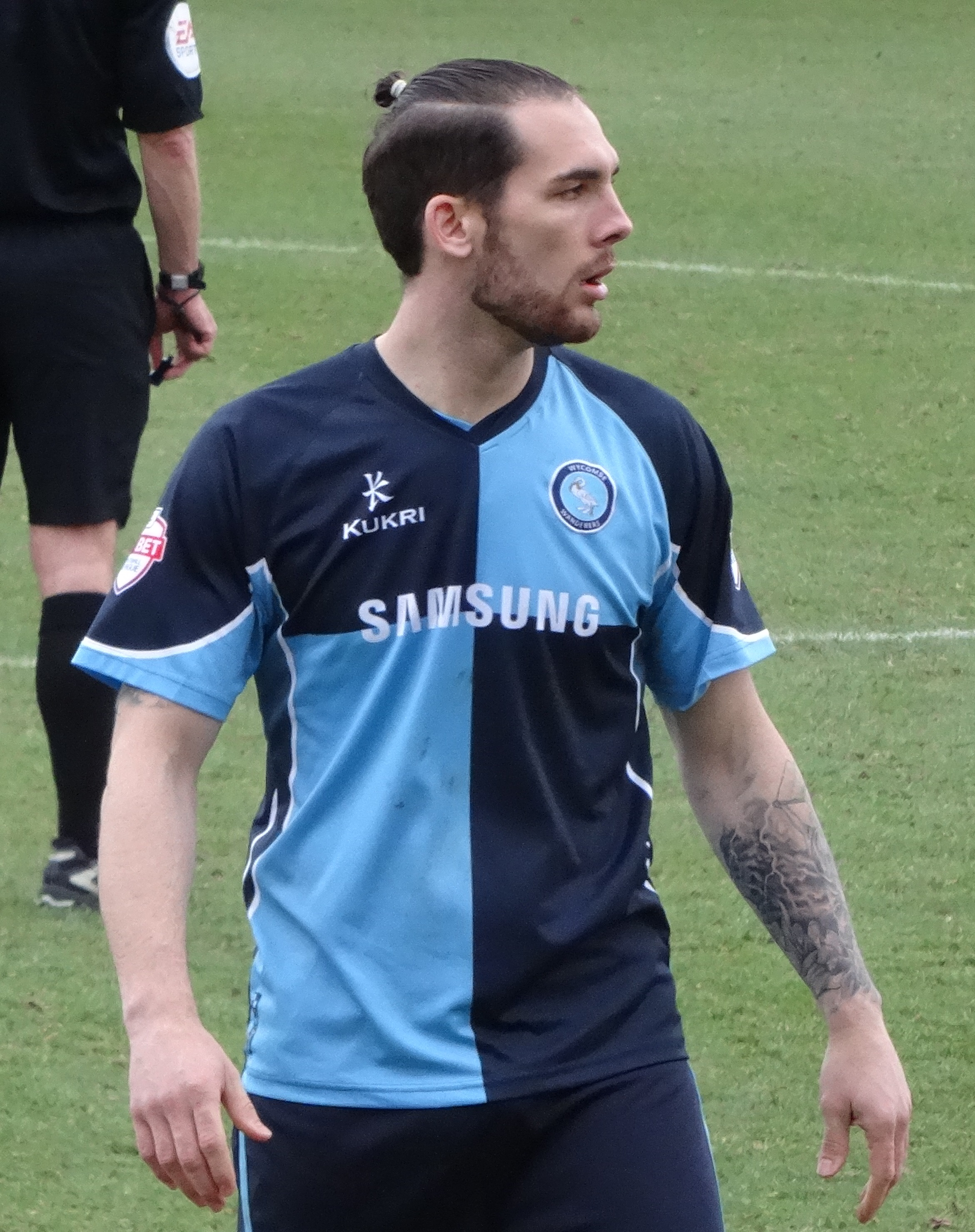
Styche playing for Wycombe Wanderers in 2014

A few days later, he joined League Two team Wycombe Wanderers on loan until the end of the season. He made his debut against Mansfield Town and was replaced after 69 minutes of his first game in the Football League. He appeared 14 times for Wycombe, left the club at the end of his loan spell, and was one of ten players released by Forest Green at the end of the season.

=== Non-League football ===
On 15 May 2014, Styche signed a two-year deal with Conference club Kidderminster Harriers. He made his debut on 9 August, coming off the bench in a 0–0 draw with Lincoln City. His first goal for Kidderminster came in a 4–0 home win over Altrincham on 16 September 2014.

In October 2014, he joined Conference North club Tamworth on loan. He scored on his debut for Tamworth. He went on to make five appearances, scoring twice, during his loan spell. On 13 January 2015, Styche joined Tamworth on loan for a second spell until the end of the season. On 8 August 2015 Styche scored on his return to the Harriers' first team in a 2–2 draw with Grimsby Town.

On 30 October 2015, Styche joined Macclesfield Town of the National League on loan until January 2016. Despite a contract offer to stay at Macclesfield, Styche signed for fellow National League club Gateshead in May 2016. After his Gateshead contract was cancelled in January 2017, Styche signed for Tamworth, where he had previously spent time on loan. In November 2017, he moved on to another National League North club, Darlington, for an undisclosed fee. He scored 11 goals in 21 league matches in what remained of the season and, according to the Northern Echo, played a major role in the club avoiding relegation. In October 2018, Darlington accepted an offer for Styche's services from divisional rivals Alfreton Town, apparently for financial reasons. He completed the move on 24 October and scored after seven minutes of his debut three days later.

On 23 May 2019, it was announced that Styche had transferred to league rivals Hereford. In February 2020, he joined Southern Premier Central side Bromsgrove Sporting. However, he was only able to make one league appearance for the club before the season was abandoned due to the COVID-19 pandemic, and in June 2020 he moved again, this time to Buxton of the Northern Premier League Premier Division. With another season curtailed by the pandemic, Styche moved once more in May 2021, this time returning to Hednesford Town after 13 years away. His stay, however, was short-lived and early in the season he switched to league rivals Stourbridge. After a year and a half at the Glassboys, he moved once again in March 2023, this time joining Matlock Town.

== International career ==
In 2010, Styche received a call-up to the England C squad; he made his debut in the 2009–11 International Challenge Trophy final against Portugal U23 on 19 May 2011. In January 2014, head coach Allen Bula named Styche as a player on his radar who could play with the Gibraltar national football team in the near future. On 11 February, he was called up to the Gibraltar national squad for friendlies against the Faroe Islands and Estonia. He qualifies to play for Gibraltar through his grandmother.

He made his Gibraltar debut on 1 March, starting in a 4–1 defeat against the Faroe Islands. Upon the arrival of new national team coach Julio César Ribas in July 2018, Styche was included in his first open squad list. He was subsequently called up to Ribas's first UEFA Nations League squad, and came off the bench in both matches, against Macedonia and Liechtenstein. He scored his first international goal on 18 November 2019, in a UEFA Euro 2020 qualifier against Switzerland.

== Career statistics ==
Appearances and goals by national team and year
| National team | Year | Apps | Goals |
|---|---|---|---|
| England C | 2011 | 1 | 0 |
| Total | | 1 | 0 |
| Gibraltar | 2014 | 1 | 0 |
| Gibraltar | 2015 | 0 | 0 |
| Gibraltar | 2016 | 0 | 0 |
| Gibraltar | 2017 | 0 | 0 |
| Gibraltar | 2018 | 3 | 0 |
| Gibraltar | 2019 | 3 | 1 |
| Gibraltar | 2020 | 5 | 0 |
| Gibraltar | 2021 | 9 | 2 |
| Gibraltar | 2022 | 9 | 0 |
| Gibraltar | 2023 | 1 | 0 |
| Total | | 31 | 3 |

Scores and results list Gibraltar's goal tally first.

| No. | Date | Venue | Opponent | Score | Result | Competition |
|---|---|---|---|---|---|---|
| 1. | 18 November 2019 | Victoria Stadium, Gibraltar | Switzerland | 1–3 | 1–6 | UEFA Euro 2020 qualification |
| 2. | 27 March 2021 | Podgorica City Stadium, Podgorica, Montenegro | Montenegro | 1–1 | 1–4 | 2022 FIFA World Cup qualification |
| 3. | 7 September 2021 | Ullevaal Stadion, Oslo, Norway | Norway | 1–3 | 1–5 | 2022 FIFA World Cup qualification |
