= James Scanlon (footballer) =

Gibraltarian footballer (born 2006)

Personal information
- Full name: James Robert Scanlon
- Date of birth: 28 September 2006 (age 20)
- Place of birth: Leicester, England
- Positions: Attacking midfielder; winger

Team information
- Current team: Arsenal
- Number: 63

Youth career
- 2016–2021: Derby County
- 2021–2025: Manchester United

Senior career*
| Years | Team | Apps | (Gls) |
| 2025–2026 | Manchester United | 0 | (0) |
| 2026 | → Swindon Town (loan) | 6 | (1) |
| 2026– | Arsenal | 0 | (0) |

International career^{‡}
| 2022 | Gibraltar U17 | 4 | (3) |
| 2023– | Gibraltar U21 | 4 | (0) |
| 2024– | Gibraltar | 30 | (6) |
- * Club domestic league appearances and goals as of 18 April 2026 ‡ National team caps and goals as of 18 November 2026

James Robert Scanlon (born 28 September 2006) is a professional footballer who plays as an attacking midfielder or winger for Premier League club Arsenal. Born in England, he plays for the Gibraltar national team.

A product of Derby County and Manchester United academies, Scanlon became the first Manchester United player to represent Gibraltar while at the club.

== Club career ==
=== Youth career ===
Scanlon began playing youth football at Derby County before joining Manchester United in February 2021 amidst growing financial uncertainty at Pride Park. After breaking into the under-18 team towards the end of the 2022–23 season, he became a first-year scholar with the Red Devils in July 2023. During the 2023–24 season he participated in the Red Devils' 2023–24 UEFA Youth League campaign while also making appearances for the under-21 side and training with the first team under Erik ten Hag. He signed his first professional deal on 23 May 2024, subsequently travelling with the first team on their pre-season tour of the United States. In August, he won the Best Forward award at that year's Otten Cup youth tournament.

=== Manchester United ===
After an impressive 2024–25 season with the youth teams, Scanlon was named in a senior matchday squad for the first time on 13 March 2025, in a UEFA Europa League tie against Real Sociedad.

==== Loan to Swindon Town ====
On 2 February 2026, despite interest from across Europe, Scanlon moved on loan to EFL League Two side Swindon Town for the rest of the 2025–26 season.

=== Arsenal ===
On 29 August 2026, Arsenal confirmed the signing of Scanlon.

== International career ==
Scanlon was born on 28 September 2006, in the Midlands to an English father and Gibraltarian mother, making him eligible to represent England and Gibraltar. He first represented Gibraltar at under-17 level, scoring a brace on his debut as Gibraltar recorded a shock 8–2 win over Liechtenstein on 25 August 2022. The next year he made his under-21 debut in a 2–0 defeat to Georgia in Kutaisi, on 6 September 2023. On 15 March 2024, he was called up to a revamped senior team by head coach Julio César Ribas for their UEFA Nations League play-out against Lithuania.

On 21 March 2024, Scanlon made his senior debut as a 74th-minute substitute for Liam Walker in a 0–1 loss against Lithuania. On 8 September 2024, Scanlon scored his first senior goal and first for his country, as Gibraltar drew 2–2 with Liechtenstein in their opening match of the 2024–25 Nations League. The goal made him the country's and the UEFA Nations League youngest goalscorer at 17 years 346 days, breaking the records previously set by Tjay De Barr.

== Style of play ==
Scanlon is right-footed and plays on the left wing.

== Personal life ==
Scanlon's mother Gabriella (née Falero) is a former athlete who jointly holds the Gibraltarian record for the women's 4 × 100 m relay, and met her husband while studying at Loughborough University. His father Rob was a British Universities and Colleges Sport champion in the 1500 metres. His younger brother, Luca, is currently in the youth system at Burnley, and has also represented Gibraltar at international level.

== Career statistics ==
=== Club ===
As of match played 15 September 2026

Appearances and goals by club, season and competition
| Club | Season | League | | | FA Cup | | EFL Cup | | Europe | | Other | | Total | |
| Club | Season | Division | Apps | Goals | Apps | Goals | Apps | Goals | Apps | Goals | Apps | Goals | Apps | Goals |
|---|---|---|---|---|---|---|---|---|---|---|---|---|---|---|
| Manchester United U21 | 2023–24 | — | | | — | | — | | — | | 1 (Note: Appearance in EFL Trophy) | 0 | 1 | 0 |
| Manchester United U21 | 2024–25 | — | | | — | | — | | — | | 1 (Note: Appearance in National League Cup) | 0 | 1 | 0 |
| Manchester United U21 | 2025–26 | — | | | — | | — | | — | | 6 (Note: Three appearances in EFL Trophy, three appearances and one goal in National League Cup) | 1 | 6 | 1 |
| Manchester United U21 | Total | | — | | — | | — | | — | | 8 | 1 | 8 | 1 |
| Manchester United | 2024–25 | Premier League | 0 | 0 | 0 | 0 | 0 | 0 | 0 | 0 | 0 | 0 | 0 | 0 |
| Manchester United | 2025–26 | Premier League | 0 | 0 | 0 | 0 | 0 | 0 | — | | — | | 0 | 0 |
| Manchester United | Total | | 0 | 0 | 0 | 0 | 0 | 0 | 0 | 0 | 0 | 0 | 0 | 0 |
| Swindon Town (loan) | 2025–26 | League Two | 6 | 1 | 0 | 0 | 0 | 0 | — | | 0 | 0 | 6 | 1 |
| Arsenal U21 | 2026–27 | — | | | — | | — | | — | | 1 | 0 | 1 | 0 |
| Career total | | | 6 | 1 | 0 | 0 | 0 | 0 | 0 | 0 | 9 | 1 | 15 | 2 |

=== International ===
As of match played 16 November 2026

Appearances and goals by national team and year
| National team | Year | Apps | Goals |
|---|---|---|---|
| Gibraltar | 2024 | 10 | 1 |
| Gibraltar | 2025 | 10 | 1 |
| Gibraltar | 2026 | 10 | 4 |
| Total | | 30 | 6 |

Scores and results list Gibraltar's goal tally first, score column indicates score after each Scanlon goal.

List of international goals scored by James Scanlon
| No. | Date | Venue | Opponent | Score | Result | Competition |
|---|---|---|---|---|---|---|
| 1 | 8 September 2024 | Europa Point Stadium, Europa Point, Gibraltar | Liechtenstein | 2–1 | 2–2 | 2024–25 UEFA Nations League D |
| 2 | 9 June 2025 | Tórsvøllur, Tórshavn, Faroe Islands | Faroe Islands | 1–0 | 1–2 | 2026 FIFA World Cup qualification |
| 3 | 3 June 2026 | Europa Point Stadium, Europa Point, Gibraltar | British Virgin Islands | 2–0 | 4–0 | Friendly |
| 4 | 3 June 2026 | Europa Point Stadium, Europa Point, Gibraltar | British Virgin Islands | 4–0 | 4–0 | Friendly |
| 5 | 6 June 2026 | Europa Point Stadium, Europa Point, Gibraltar | Cayman Islands | 1–1 | 4–1 | Friendly |
| 6 | 1 October 2026 | National Stadium, Ta' Qali, Malta | Malta | 1–1 | 1–1 | 2026–27 UEFA Nations League D |
