= Ryan Casciaro =

Gibraltarian footballer

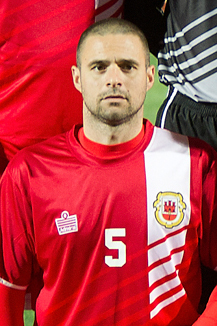
- Ryan Casciaro at the Victoria Stadium in March 2014

Personal information
- Date of birth: 11 May 1984 (age 42)
- Place of birth: Gibraltar
- Position: Defender

Team information
- Current team: Lincoln Red Imps U23 (manager)

Youth career
- Rock Wolves

Senior career*
Years	Team	Apps	(Gls)
2000–2006	Gibraltar United (Note: Gibraltar United stats before 2013 are unknown)		
2006–2018	Lincoln Red Imps (Note: Lincoln stats before 2013 are unknown)	31	(2)
2018–2021	St Joseph's	23	(0)
2021	Manchester 62	4	(0)

International career
2006–2011	Gibraltar XI (Non-FIFA)	5	(0)
2013–2018	Gibraltar	24	(0)

Managerial career
- 2023–: Lincoln Red Imps U23
- 2026–: Gibraltar U16
- * Club domestic league appearances and goals

Ryan Casciaro (born 11 May 1984) is a retired Gibraltarian football defender who played for Gibraltar Premier Division side Manchester 62 and the Gibraltar national team. After spending the majority of his senior career at Lincoln Red Imps, he joined St Joseph's on 5 August 2018, he joined Manchester 62 on 4 February 2021.

== International career ==
Casciaro made his international debut with Gibraltar on 19 November 2013 in a 0-0 home draw with Slovakia. This was Gibraltar's first game since being admitted to UEFA.

=== International career statistics ===
Appearances and goals by national team and year
National team	Year	Apps	Goals
Gibraltar XI (non-FIFA)
Gibraltar XI (non-FIFA)	2006	1	0
Gibraltar XI (non-FIFA)	2007	0	0
Gibraltar XI (non-FIFA)	2008	0	0
Gibraltar XI (non-FIFA)	2009	0	0
Gibraltar XI (non-FIFA)	2010	0	0
Gibraltar XI (non-FIFA)	2011	4	0
Gibraltar XI (non-FIFA)	Total	5	0
Gibraltar	2013	1	0
Gibraltar	2014	8	0
Gibraltar	2015	5	0
Gibraltar	2016	7	0
Gibraltar	2017	2	0
Gibraltar	2018	1	0
Gibraltar	Total	24	0
Career total		29	0

== Personal life ==
Casciaro is a policeman for the Gibraltar Defence Police. His brothers Kyle and Lee have also played with Gibraltar's national side.
