= Allen Bula =

Gibraltarian footballer (born 1965)

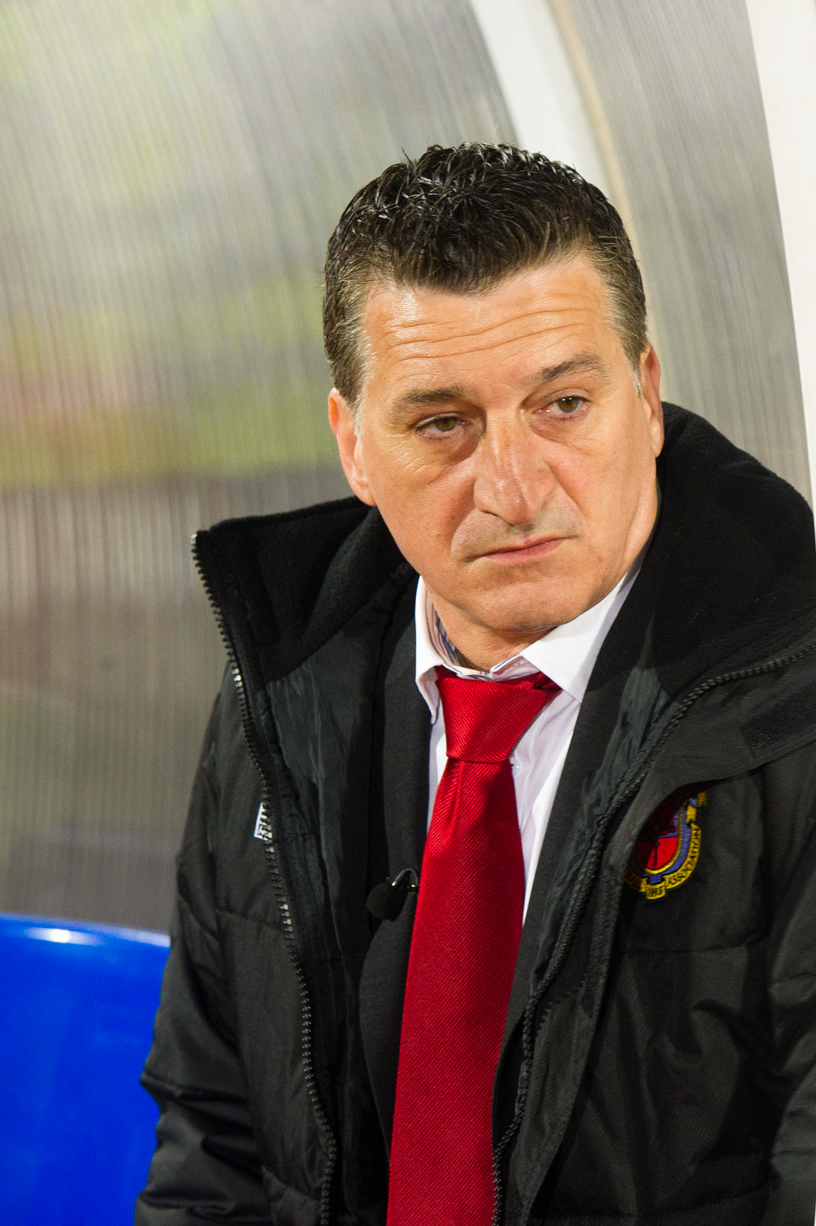
- Bula in 2014

Personal information
- Date of birth: 4 January 1965 (age 61)
- Place of birth: Gibraltar

Team information
- Current team: Manchester 62 (interim head coach)

Senior career*
Years	Team	Apps	(Gls)
	Gibraltar United	35	
	St Joseph's	14	
	Glacis United	28	

International career
- Gibraltar U21
- Gibraltar (Non-FIFA)

Managerial career
- 2002–2003: Dover Athletic U18
- 2006–2010: MFK Košice (Academy Manager)
- 2009–2015: Gibraltar
- 2016–2017: Lynx (Director of Football)
- 2017: Lynx
- 2018: Boca Gibraltar (Head of Youth Development)
- 2018–2019: Boca Gibraltar
- 2019: Europa Point
- 2022: Mons Calpe
- 2023: Manchester 62 (interim)
- 2025–: Manchester 62 (interim)
- * Club domestic league appearances and goals

Allen Bula (born 4 January 1965) is a Gibraltarian football manager and former player. He was notably the first manager of the Gibraltar national football team.

== Playing career ==
As a player, he played for Gibraltar United, St Joseph's and Glacis United.

== Coaching career ==
Between 2006 and 2010, he was the head of football development and academy manager at Slovak first division club MFK Košice. While in that role he discovered several talented players, most notably Nemanja Matić, who subsequently played for Chelsea and Manchester United.

Bula was appointed as the manager of the Gibraltar national team in November 2009.

Between 2009 and 2013 Bula managed the national team in 47 matches, against professional teams from Spain's 2b & 2a leagues, and English Championship & League One teams. Bula's success rate was 78%, with victories over teams such as Portsmouth, Notts County, England C, Bury and Real Balompédica Linense. Most notable was the 3–0 win over the Faroe Islands in 2013 prior to UEFA membership.

Bula managed the national team in their debut as a Uefa member against Slovakia, and earned a draw which sent shock waves around Europe. That was followed by a 1–1 draw away to Estonia and Gibraltar's first win as Uefa member, against Malta. For political reasons, though, it was decided that Gibraltar would be kept apart from Spain in qualification draws.

Bula's tactical approach to the Euro 2016 qualifier against World Cup holders Germany resulted in a 4–0 win for Germany, a creditable result for Gibraltar as many people were expecting Germany to come away with a much heavier victory. Only one goal was scored in second half and that was an own goal by Gibraltar.

On 18 January 2015, Bula arrived in England to partake in the UEFA Pro-Licence course at the St George's Park National Football Centre, alongside coaches such as Jimmy Floyd Hasselbaink, Phil Neville and Scott Parker. However, after a poor start to Gibraltar's Euro 2016 qualification campaign, combined with Bula's defensive approach, he was sacked in March 2015, receiving a settlement shortly afterwards.

After a short spell as Director of Football at Lynx in 2016, he took over management of the club in June 2017 after chairman/manager Albert Parody decided to step back from on-the-pitch activities. However, he would only last just over 4 months in the role as he left in October that year, after a disastrous start to the club's campaign. On 19 December 2018, he was appointed manager of Boca Gibraltar after the departure of Juanjo Pomares. He had previously served as a director at the club, along with his son Allen Bulla Jr, who works as head of youth development at the club. On 19 June 2019, he was appointed manager of Europa Point.

On 17 May 2022, he was appointed manager of Mons Calpe after the departure of Leo Fuentes.

== Personal life ==
His nephew is former footballer Danny Higginbotham.

== Managerial statistics ==
As of 5 October 2019

Goal statistics for Gibraltar pre-UEFA membership unknown.

Team	From	To	Record						
Team	From	To	Played	Won	Drawn	Lost	GF	GA	Win %
Gibraltar (unofficial)	November 2009	May 2013	47	34	7	6	?	?	72.34
Gibraltar	May 2013	March 2015	9	1	2	6	3	28	11.11
Lynx	June 2017	October 2017	4	0	0	4	0	12	0.00
Boca Gibraltar	December 2018	May 2019	16	0	0	16	9	103	0.00
Europa Point	June 2019	Present	5	1	1	3	2	9	20.00
