= Kyle Casciaro =

Gibraltarian footballer (born 1987)

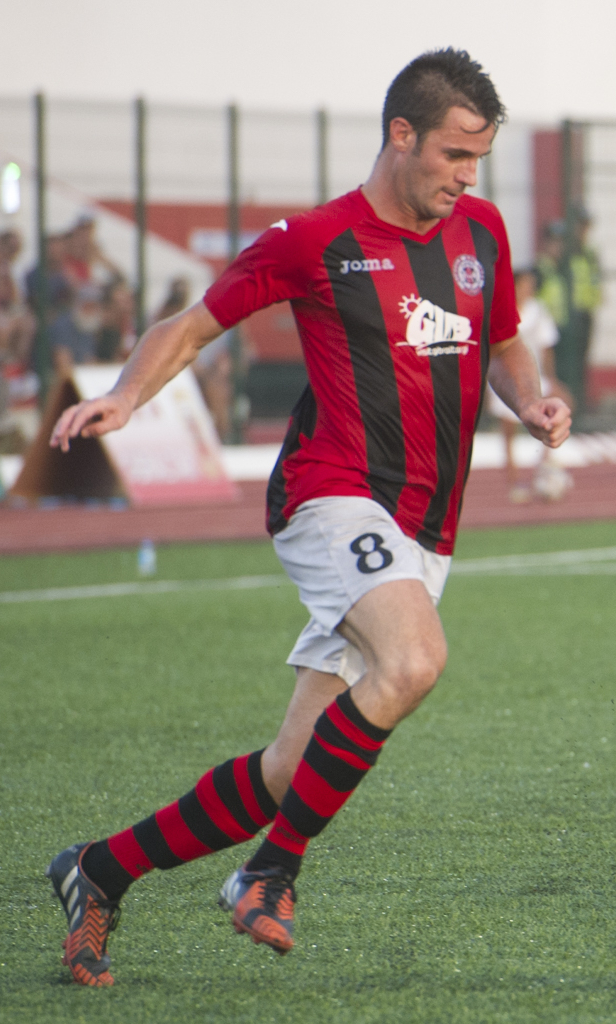
- Casciaro with Lincoln Red Imps in 2015

Personal information
- Date of birth: 2 December 1987 (age 38)
- Place of birth: Gibraltar
- Positions: Winger; forward

Senior career*
Years	Team	Apps	(Gls)
2010–2013	Lincoln Red Imps		
2013–2017	Lincoln Red Imps	77	(37)
2018–2019	Lincoln Red Imps	11	(0)
2018	→ FC Olympique 13 (loan)	6	(0)
2019–2020	St Joseph's	7	(1)
2020–2021	Lincoln Red Imps	11	(3)
2021–2024	FCB Magpies	55	(11)
2024–	Lynx	13	(2)

International career
2011	Gibraltar XI (Non-FIFA)	2	(0)
2013–2020	Gibraltar	26	(1)
- * Club domestic league appearances and goals as of 13 December 2024

Kyle Casciaro (born 2 December 1987) is a Gibraltarian footballer who plays for Lynx, and the Gibraltar national team, where he plays as a winger or forward.

== Club career ==
Casciaro came through the ranks of Lincoln Red Imps with brothers Ryan and Lee, becoming ever present in the dominant Red Imps team that won 6 of its 14 consecutive league titles from 2010 to 2016. After suffering a serious injury in summer 2017, he retired from football. However, in January 2018 he came out of retirement, re-joining Lincoln while joining FC Olympique 13 on loan for the rest of the season, in order to regain match fitness. He announced his departure from Lincoln again on Twitter, in June 2019.

== International career ==
Casciaro made his international debut with Gibraltar on 19 November 2013 in a 0–0 home draw with Slovakia. This was Gibraltar's first game since being admitted to UEFA He was the first Gibraltarian footballer to score a winning goal at senior international level since joining UEFA, having struck against Malta in June 2014.

=== International goals ===
#	Date	Venue	Cap	Opponent	Score	Result	Competition	Source
1	4 June 2014	Estádio Algarve, Faro, Portugal	5	Malta	1–0	1–0	Friendly	

Appearances and goals by national team and year
National team	Year	Apps	Goals
Gibraltar XI (non-FIFA)	2011	2	0
Gibraltar XI (non-FIFA)	Total	2	0
Gibraltar
Gibraltar	2013	1	0
Gibraltar	2014	7	1
Gibraltar	2015	6	0
Gibraltar	2016	7	0
Gibraltar	2017	2	0
Gibraltar	2018	1	0
Gibraltar	2019	0	0
Gibraltar	2020	2	0
Gibraltar	Total	26	1
Career total		28	1

== Personal life ==
Casciaro works as an Operations Executive at Peninsula Petroleum in Gibraltar. His brothers Lee and Ryan have also played with Gibraltar's national side.
