= 2024–25 Rock Cup =

Football tournament season in Gibraltar

Tournament details
- Country: Gibraltar
- Dates: 1 February – 29 March 2025
- Teams: 12

Final positions
- Champions: FCB Magpies (2nd title)
- Runners-up: Lions Gibraltar

Tournament statistics
- Matches played: 11
- Goals scored: 58 (5.27 per match)
- Top goal scorer: 3 players (5 goals)

The 2024–25 Rock Cup is a single-leg knockout football tournament contested by clubs from Gibraltar. The cup will be contested by the eleven teams from the 2024–25 Gibraltar Football League teams and one team from the 2024–25 Gibraltar Intermediate League. The winners qualified for the 2025–26 UEFA Conference League first qualifying round.

== First round ==
1 February 2025	Mons Calpe	0–0 (4–2 p)	Europa	Europa Point, Gibraltar
15:30		Report		Stadium: Europa Point Stadium; Referee: Herbert Warwick

1 February 2025	Lynx	3–5	Manchester 62	Europa Point, Gibraltar
18:30	Farisato 25', 40', 74'	Report	Perry 3', 41'; Benítez 33', 51'; Chipolina 56'	Stadium: Europa Point Stadium; Referee: Israel Fosela

2 February 2025	St Joseph's	5–0	College 1975	Europa Point, Gibraltar
15:30	Armental 12'; Gibson 23'; Álvarez 64', 89'; Paul 90+3'	Report		Stadium: Europa Point Stadium; Referee: Jose Antonio Diaz

2 February 2025	Europa Point	0–4	FCB Magpies	Europa Point, Gibraltar
18:30		Report	Forján 12' (pen.), 36'; Del Rio 47'; Carrascal 78'	Stadium: Europa Point Stadium; Referee: Jason Barcelo

== Quarter-finals ==
The draw for the quarter-finals took place on 6 February 2025. Games were played on 15 and 16 February.

15 February 2025	FCB Magpies	17–0	Hound Dogs	Europa Point, Gibraltar
15:30	Borge 1', 7', 19', 71'; Forján 2', 12'; Hernandez 6', 21'; Villar 11'; Del Rio 13'; García 18', 68', 86', 88'; Taylor 29', 38'; Loen 36'	Report		Stadium: Europa Point Stadium; Referee: Seth Galia

15 February 2025	St Joseph's	1–1 (2–4 p)	Lions Gibraltar	Europa Point, Gibraltar
18:30	Juanfri 45+3' (pen.)	Report	Dulleck 38'	Stadium: Europa Point Stadium; Referee: Herbert Warwick
	Penalties
	Armental (penalty missed); Pons (penalty missed); Cardozo (penalty scored); Gibson (penalty scored)		(penalty missed) Volz; (penalty scored) Ndjoli; (penalty scored) Flynn-Gillespie; (penalty scored) Hamdi; (penalty scored) Awoyale

16 February 2025	Lincoln Red Imps	3–0	Mons Calpe	Europa Point, Gibraltar
15:30	De Barr 77' (pen.); Peacock 88', 90'	Report		Stadium: Europa Point Stadium; Referee: Jason Barcelo

16 February 2025	Manchester 62	7–2	Glacis United	Europa Point, Gibraltar
18:30	Queni 13'; Mochizuki 16'; Cañas 27'; Ocran 35' (pen.); Benítez 45+1', 67'; Mott 46'	Report	Bakare 36'; Ralenekov 72'	Stadium: Europa Point Stadium; Referee: Jose Antonio Diaz

== Semi-finals ==
The draw for the semi-finals took place on 21 February 2025. Matches took place on 1 and 2 March 2025.

1 March 2025	FCB Magpies	2–1	Lincoln Red Imps	Europa Point, Gibraltar
16:30	Forján 52'; García 74'	Report	Nano 90+1' (pen.)	Stadium: Europa Point Stadium; Referee: Seth Galia

2 March 2025	Lions Gibraltar	2–1	Manchester 62	Europa Point, Gibraltar
16:30	Flynn-Gillespie 87', 90'	Report	Chipolina 35'	Stadium: Europa Point Stadium; Referee: Jose Antonio Diaz

== Final ==
The final was held after the March international break. FCB Magpies were victorious against Lions Gibraltar, preventing them from winning their first Rock Cup, but adding another trophy to the Magpies collection.

29 March 2025
15:00

Lions Gibraltar	1–3	FCB Magpies
Dulleck 23'	Report	Juanje 12'; Del Rio 16'; Borge 90+5'

Europa Point Stadium, Europa Point, Gibraltar
Referee: Jason Barcelo

== Scorers ==
5 goals

- (Gibraltar) Dylan Borge (FCB Magpies)
- (Spain) Javi Forján (FCB Magpies)
- (Spain) Carlos García (FCB Magpies)

4 goals

- (Spain) Samu Benítez (Manchester 62)

3 goals

- (Gibraltar) Julian Del Rio (FCB Magpies)
- (Venezuela) Marco Farisato (Lynx)

2 goals

- (Gibraltar) Anthony Hernandez (FCB Magpies)
- (Wales) Ash Taylor (FCB Magpies)
- (Gibraltar) Javan Peacock (Lincoln Red Imps)
- (Germany) Patrick Dulleck (Lions Gibralter)
- (Scotland) Connor Flynn-Gillespie (Lions Gibraltar)
- (Gibraltar) Joseph Chipolina (Manchester 62)
- (England) Frankie Perry (Manchester 62)
- (Argentina) Facu Álvarez (St Joseph's)

1 goal

- (Spain) Alé Carrascal (FCB Magpies)
- (Spain) Juanje (FCB Magpies)
- (Netherlands) Youri Loen (FCB Magpies)
- (Argentina) Federico Villar (FCB Magpies)
- (England) Michael Bakare (Glacis United)
- (England) Anthony Ralenekov (Glacis United)
- (Gibraltar) Tjay De Barr (Lincoln Red Imps)
- (Spain) Nano (Lincoln Red Imps)
- (Spain) José Cañas (Manchester 62)
- (Japan) Hibiki Mochizuki (Manchester 62)
- (England) Henry Mott (Manchester 62)
- (Ghana) Emmanuel Ocran (Manchester 62)
- (Guinea-Bissau) Deimar Queni (Manchester 62)
- (Spain) Adrián Armental (St Joseph's)
- (Gibraltar) Mitchell Gibson (St Joseph's)
- (Spain) Juanfri (St Joseph's)
- (Spain) Javi Paul (St Joseph's)
