= Calpe City Magpies F.C. =

Association football club in Gibraltar

Calpe City Magpies
- Full name: Calpe City Magpies Football Club
- Nicknames: The Magpies, Calpe
- Founded: 1 June 2025; 12 months ago
- Ground: Victoria Stadium, Gibraltar
- Capacity: 2,300
- Owners: Haig Oundjian; Seamus Byrne
- Manager: Vacant
- League: Gibraltar Football League
- 2026–27: First season

Calpe City Magpies F.C. are a semi-professional football team from Gibraltar. They play in the Gibraltar Football League and contest the Rock Cup.

The club announced on 6 April 2025. it will merge on 1 June 2025 with Calpe City, a sports club which participates in various sport disciplines to strengthen not only its youth football, but also to promote cross-training with other sports disciplines. The club will continue to operate as FCB Magpies in the 2025–26 season before commencing play as Calpe City Magpies in 2026.

== History ==
Bruno's Magpies was formed in 2013 by Louis Perry with support from Bruno's Bar and Grill, from which the club got its name, adopting the "Magpies" nickname from Newcastle United after a request from first manager Mick Embleton. After spending its first 6 seasons in the Gibraltar Second Division, it became a founder member of the new Gibraltar National League in 2019, eventually winning its first major honour, the Rock Cup, in 2023 under the management of Nathan Rooney. The club won its second title in 2025.

Calpe City formed in 2019 after the collapse of Gibraltar United, in order to preserve the successful youth system that had been set up there, competing in numerous international youth tournaments including the 2023 Boni Cup in Algarve. However, despite being able to play youth football and join the futsal system, the club saw resistance from other clubs regarding full membership and participating in the Gibraltar Football League, seeing its application rejected in 2022. In 2023 they reached an agreement with Europa Point to act as their youth system, but frictions with the agreement led to Calpe City announcing its intention to fold in 2024. After the Gibraltar Football Association intervened in the dispute, the two clubs continued their arrangement for a further season.

On 6 April 2025, both FCB Magpies and Calpe City Sports Club announced their plans to merge at the end of the 2024–25 Gibraltar Football League season, with co-operation from the Gibraltar Institute of Sport to aid development of players. FCB Magpies' victory in the 2024–25 Rock Cup, means it will participate in its 4th season in the 2025–26 UEFA Conference League. This participation caused the launch of Calpe City Magpies to be delayed for one more season due to UEFA rules regarding licensing.

== Club staff ==
Position	Name
Club Management
Head Coach	TBC
Assistant Coach	TBC
Board
Joint Chairmen	(England) Haig Oundjian
	(Gibraltar) Seamus Byrne
