= 2024–25 Gibraltar Football League =

Gibraltar Football League
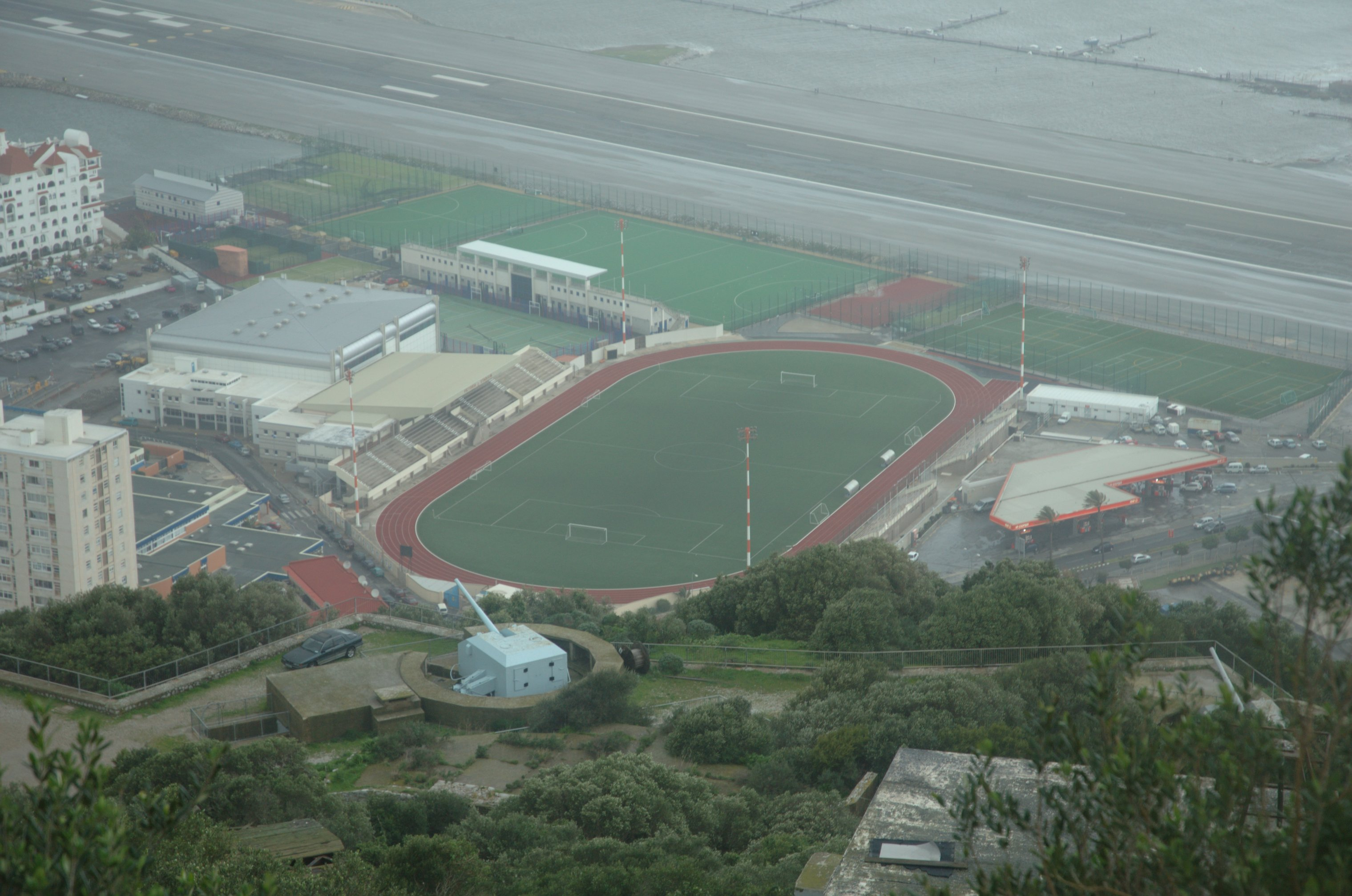
- The Victoria Stadium, where each match is played
- Season: 2024–25
- Dates: 16 August 2024 – 4 May 2025
- Champions: Lincoln Red Imps; 5th GFL title 29th overall
- Champions League: Lincoln Red Imps
- Conference League: St Joseph's; FCB Magpies
- Matches: 125
- Goals: 438 (3.5 per match)
- Top goalscorer: (Italy) Vittorio Vigolo (15 goals)
- Best goalkeeper: (Gibraltar) Bradley Banda (10 clean sheets)
- Biggest home win: Europa 8–0 Glacis United (1 December 2024)
- Biggest away win: Europa Point 0–7 FCB Magpies (23 November 2024); Lynx 0–7 St Joseph's (23 February 2025)
- Highest scoring: Europa 8–0 Glacis United (1 December 2024)
- Longest winning run: 11 games Lincoln Red Imps
- Longest unbeaten run: 20 games St Joseph's
- Longest winless run: 20 games Europa Point
- Longest losing run: 6 games Europa Point

The 2024–25 Gibraltar Football League season is the sixth season of the Gibraltar Football League in Gibraltar (and third under its current name), and the 126th season of football on the territory overall. Lincoln Red Imps are the reigning champions, winning their fourth successive title on the final day of the season with a late draw against title rivals St Joseph's. Due to the league's fall down the UEFA coefficient rankings, this season only 2 teams qualified for the UEFA Conference League.

The winners will qualify for the 2025–26 UEFA Champions League first qualifying round. The runners-up and Rock Cup winners will qualify for the 2025–26 UEFA Conference League first qualifying round.

== Format ==
The 2024–25 season is set to continue with the same format used the previous season. Instead of playing one round of fixtures before splitting, teams will instead play each other twice for a total of 20 games this season. After the second round of games, the top 6 enter the GFL Championship Group, where each team plays each other once to decide the league champion. However, the Challenge Group has been scrapped.

Due to the reconstruction of Victoria Stadium, games will be played at the Europa Sports Park this season.

== Teams ==
Location of the stadia where all teams play

On 13 May, the Gibraltar FA released the licensing awards for the 2024–25 season, following changes to their licensing criteria. Receiving the UEFA Club License were Lincoln Red Imps, St Joseph's, FCB Magpies and Lions Gibraltar. The GFA Gold License was awarded to Europa Point, Lynx, Europa and Mons Calpe. College 1975, Glacis United and Manchester 62 all received the GFA Silver License.

Note: Flags indicate national team as has been defined under FIFA eligibility rules. Players may hold more than one non-FIFA nationality.

Team	Manager	Captain	Kit manufacturer	Club sponsor	2023–24
FCB Magpies	(Gibraltar) Terence Jolley (interim)	(Mexico) Paco Zúñiga	Macron	Chestertons	3rd
College 1975	(Spain) Óscar León	(Gibraltar) Jamie-Luke McCarthy	Joma		11th
Europa	(Italy) Michele Di Piedi	(Gibraltar) Aymen Mouelhi	Kappa	Situs Construction	8th
Europa Point	(Spain) Roberto Carrasco	(Norway) Thomas Drage	Custimoo	Mobill	4th
Glacis United	(England) Michael Bakare		APX		9th
Lincoln Red Imps	(Spain) Juanjo Bezares (interim)	(Gibraltar) Bernardo Lopes	Givova	Bitolo	1st
Lions Gibraltar	(Northern Ireland) Raymond Alexander (interim)	(Gibraltar) Shea Breakspear	VX3	OLBG	10th
Lynx	(Spain) Yiyi Pérez	(Gibraltar) Michael Ruiz	Joma	First Choice Care	7th
Manchester 62	(Gibraltar) Luis McCoy	(Gibraltar) Joseph Chipolina	Joma	Concussion Legacy Foundation	6th
Mons Calpe	(Spain) Juan Marí Sánchez	(Spain) Jesús Ayala	Givova	FanPlay 365	5th
St Joseph's	(Spain) Abraham Paz	(Gibraltar) Erin Barnett	Legea		2nd

=== Managerial changes ===
Team	Outgoing manager	Manner of departure	Date of vacancy	Position in table	Incoming manager	Date of appointment
Europa Point	(Republic of Ireland) Ryan McCarthy	End of interim spell	31 May 2024	Pre-season	(Spain) Roberto Carrasco	10 June 2024
Lions Gibraltar	(Gibraltar) Adrian Parral	Sacked	10 June 2024	Pre-season	(Scotland) David Wilson	1 July 2024
College 1975	(Argentina) Leo Vela	End of contract	30 June 2024	Pre-season	(Spain) Óscar León	1 July 2024
Glacis United	(Argentina) Claudio Racino	End of contract	30 June 2024	Pre-season	(England) Michael Bakare	1 July 2024
Lincoln Red Imps	(Spain) Javi Muñoz	Mutual consent	5 September 2024	11th	(Spain) David Campaña	12 September 2024
Lynx	(Gibraltar) Albert Parody	Resigned	26 September 2024	9th	(Spain) Yiyi Pérez	26 September 2024
Europa Point	(Spain) Roberto Carrasco	Demoted	4 October 2024	11th	(Sweden) Martin Falkeborn	4 October 2024
FCB Magpies	(England) Nathan Rooney	Signed by (Northern Ireland) Larne	22 November 2024 (Note: Although Nathan Rooney left FCB Magpies on 22 November 2024, his departure was not officially announced until 25 November.)	4th	(England) Mason McClelland	22 November 2024
Europa Point	(Sweden) Martin Falkeborn	Signed by (Finland) IFK Mariehamn	27 January 2024	11th	(Spain) Roberto Carrasco	27 January 2024
FCB Magpies	(England) Mason McClelland	Sacked	10 February 2025	4th	(Gibraltar) Terence Jolley (interim)	10 February 2025
Lincoln Red Imps	(Spain) David Campaña	Mutual consent	28 February 2025	2nd	(Spain) Juanjo Bezares (interim)	28 February 2025
Lions Gibraltar	(Scotland) David Wilson	Undisclosed	6 April 2025	6th	(Northern Ireland) Raymond Alexander (interim)	6 April 2025
Manchester 62	(England) Jamie McDonough	Undisclosed	7 April 2025	4th	(Gibraltar) Luis McCoy (interim)	7 April 2025

== Regular season ==
During the regular season, each team faced each other twice before the league is split into two (with only the top six teams advancing to the GFL Championship Group).

=== League table ===
Pos	Team	Pld	W	D	L	GF	GA	GD	Pts	Qualification (Note: Teams play each other twice (20 matches), before the top six teams advance to the GFL Championship Group.)
1	St Joseph's	20	17	3	0	53	13	+40	54	Qualification for the GFL Championship Group
2	Lincoln Red Imps	20	16	3	1	57	7	+50	51	Qualification for the GFL Championship Group
3	Europa	20	13	4	3	49	19	+30	43	Qualification for the GFL Championship Group
4	FCB Magpies	20	11	1	8	48	28	+20	34	Qualification for the GFL Championship Group
5	Manchester 62	20	10	4	6	45	28	+17	34	Qualification for the GFL Championship Group
6	Lions Gibraltar	20	8	4	8	33	33	0	28	Qualification for the GFL Championship Group
7	Glacis United	20	6	1	13	29	52	−23	19	
8	College 1975	20	5	3	12	18	39	−21	18	
9	Lynx	20	5	2	13	25	51	−26	17	
10	Mons Calpe	20	4	1	15	23	54	−31	13	
11	Europa Point	20	0	4	16	14	70	−56	4	

Source: Soccerway
Rules for classification: 1) Points; 2) Head-to-head points; 3) Head-to-head goal difference; 4) Fair Play

=== Results ===
Home \ Away	FCB	COL	EFC	EPO	GLA	LIN	LGI	LYN	MAN	MON	SJO
FCB Magpies		3–2	0–0	3–2	3–1	1–4	2–1	3–0	0–2	4–1	1–3
College 1975	0–5		0–3	0–0	0–2	0–2	1–1	2–1	0–2	4–0	0–4
Europa	2–0	0–0		3–0	8–0	0–0	3–0	3–0	2–1	3–2	1–3
Europa Point	0–7	0–2	1–5		0–4	0–5	1–4	1–1	0–4	3–3	1–6
Glacis United	0–5	2–3	1–2	3–0		0–6	1–1	4–2	0–2	2–0	1–4
Lincoln Red Imps	2–0	5–1	3–1	2–0	4–1		1–2	3–0	3–0	3–0	0–0
Lions Gibraltar	2–1	1–0	2–4	3–2	4–1	0–2		0–2	2–2	4–2	1–3
Lynx	0–3	3–1	1–3	2–2	3–1	1–5	2–1		3–2	1–2	0–7
Manchester 62	2–1	1–2	2–2	7–0	3–2	0–4	1–1	4–2		4–1	1–1
Mons Calpe	2–5	3–0	1–3	2–1	1–3	0–3	0–2	1–0	0–4		1–3
St Joseph's	2–1	1–0	2–1	4–0	1–0	0–0	2–1	3–1	2–1	2–1	

Source: Soccerway
Legend: Blue = home team win; Yellow = draw; Red = away team win.

== GFL Championship Group ==
The top six teams from the regular season contest the GFL Championship Group to decide the league champion. Results from the regular season were carried over into this round.

Pos	Team	Pld	W	D	L	GF	GA	GD	Pts	Qualification	LIN	SJO	EFC	MAN	FCB	LGI
1	Lincoln Red Imps (C)	25	21	3	1	68	7	+61	66 (Note: Head to head points: Lincoln Red Imps 5, St Joseph's 2.)	Qualification for the Champions League first qualifying round					1–0	3–0
2	St Joseph's	25	21	3	1	65	15	+50	66	Qualification for the Conference League first qualifying round	0–1		2–1			6–0
3	Europa	25	16	4	5	60	29	+31	52		0–4				4–2	
4	Manchester 62	25	12	4	9	49	34	+15	40		0–2	0–2	1–2			1–0
5	FCB Magpies	25	12	1	12	52	38	+14	37	Qualification for the Conference League first qualifying round (Note: FCB Magpies qualified for the UEFA Conference League by winning the 2024–25 Rock Cup.)		0–2		0–2		
6	Lions Gibraltar	25	8	4	13	35	49	−14	28				1–4		1–2	

Source: Soccerway
Legend: Blue = home team win; Yellow = draw; Red = away team win.
Rules for classification: 1) Points; 2) Head-to-head points; 3) Head-to-head goal difference; 4) Fair Play
(C) Champions

== Season statistics ==
=== Scoring ===
==== Top scorers ====
Rank	Player	Club	Goals
1	(Italy) Vittorio Vigolo	Europa	15
2	(Spain) Labra	Europa	11
2	(Venezuela) Marco Farisato	Lynx	11
4	(Spain) Chico Rubio	FCB Magpies (Note: Includes 6 goals for Mons Calpe.)	10
4	(Philippines) Kike Gómez	Lincoln Red Imps	10
4	(Spain) Samu Benítez	Manchester 62	10
4	(Guinea-Bissau) Deimar Queni	Manchester 62 (Note: Includes 6 goals for Glacis United.)	10
4	(Spain) Pablo Rodríguez	St Joseph's	10
9	(Spain) Javi Forján	FCB Magpies	9
9	(Spain) Nano	Lincoln Red Imps	9
9	(Spain) Víctor Villacañas	Lincoln Red Imps	9
9	(Scotland) Connor Flynn-Gillespie	Lions Gibraltar	9
9	(Spain) Juanfri	St Joseph's	9

==== Hat-tricks ====
Player	For	Against	Result	Date
(Guinea-Bissau) Deimar Queni	Glacis United	Europa Point	4–0 (A)	17 August 2024
(Spain) Víctor Villacañas	Lincoln Red Imps	Glacis United	6–0 (A)	9 November 2024
(Venezuela) Marco Farisato	Lynx	Manchester 62	3–2 (H)	13 December 2024

=== Clean sheets ===
Rank	Player	Club	Clean sheets
1	(Gibraltar) Bradley Banda	St Joseph's	10
2	(Spain) Nauzet Santana	Lincoln Red Imps	8
2	(Central African Republic) Dominique Youfeigane	Manchester 62	8
4	(Gibraltar) Christian Lopez	FCB Magpies	7
4	(Serbia) Stefan Čupić	Lincoln Red Imps	7
6	(Italy) Marco Angeletti	Europa	5
7	(Spain) Borja Valadés	College 1975	4
7	(Spain) Vitolo	Lincoln Red Imps	4
9	(Gibraltar) Jaylan Hankins	Europa	3
9	(England) Adam Stevens	Glacis United	3
