= Ayoub El Hmidi =

Gibraltarian footballer (born 2000)

Personal information
- Full name: Ayoub El Hmidi
- Date of birth: 30 September 2000 (age 26)
- Place of birth: Ksar el-Kebir, Morocco
- Height: 1.82 m (6 ft 0 in)
- Positions: Midfielder; forward

Team information
- Current team: Al Dhaid
- Number: 11

Youth career
- Lions Gibraltar

Senior career*
Years	Team	Apps	(Gls)
2016–2017	Lions Gibraltar	2	(0)
2017–2018	Glacis United	0	(0)
2018–2022	Mons Calpe	56	(17)
2022	Europa	0	(0)
2022–2023	St Joseph's	19	(2)
2023	Torrijos	0	(0)
2024	KAC Marrakech	0	(0)
2024	FCB Magpies	6	(1)
2024	AS Gabès	5	(0)
2025	USM d'Oujda	11	(0)
2025–2026	Jubbah	29	(13)
2026–	Al Dhaid	9	(1)

International career^{‡}
2018	Gibraltar U19	3	(0)
2019–2022	Gibraltar U21	18	(0)
2023–	Gibraltar	15	(0)
- * Club domestic league appearances and goals as of 20 November 2026 ‡ National team caps and goals as of 8 October 2025

Ayoub El Hmidi (Arabic: أيوب الحميدي; born 30 September 2000) is a professional footballer who plays as a midfielder or forward for UAE First Division League side Al Dhaid. Born in Morocco, he plays for the Gibraltar national team.

== Club career ==
Born in Ksar el-Kebir, Morocco, El Hmidi spent part of his childhood there, where he began playing at a local academy before moving with his family to Gibraltar at around fifteen. In Gibraltar, he began his career with Lions Gibraltar, as a youth product, and made two appearances during his debut season before signing with Glacis United, where he didn't play a league game. In 2018, he joined Mons Calpe, for whom he scored 17 goals in 56 league appearances over four seasons. He also appeared twice in the 2021–22 UEFA Europa Conference League.

In 2022 El Hmidi signed for Europa for their UEFA Europa Conference League campaign, and after the Greens' exit from the competition he joined St Joseph's. After one season he signed for CD Torrijos in Spain on 13 July 2023. However, paperwork issues delayed his debut for the club. After terminating his contract in December due to these registration issues, he relocated to Morocco in January 2024, joining KAC Marrakech on a two-and-a-half year contract and becoming the first Gibraltarian footballer to play in Africa. Despite this, after only a month at the club where he only played in friendlies, he terminated his contract at the end of the winter 2024 window and returned to Gibraltar, joining FCB Magpies.

At the end of the season, El Hmidi returned to North Africa, joining newly promoted Tunisian Ligue Professionnelle 1 side AS Gabès. His contract was terminated by the club in January 2025 following an alleged dispute with coaching staff. He instead returned to Morocco to join USM d'Oujda on 24 January 2025. He scored his first goal in Morocco on 5 April 2025, netting the winner in extra time against top flight side Raja CA in the 2024–25 Moroccan Throne Cup Round of 16. At the end of the season he left the club and joined newly promoted Saudi Second Division League side Jubbah Club. On 30 October 2025, he scored the opening goal in a 2–1 away win over Al-Shoulla, Jubbah's first leage win of the season. After an impressive season in Saudi Arabia, where he scored 13 goals in 29 appearances, he moved to the United Arab Emirates in July 2026, joining Al Dhaid.

== International career ==
El Hmidi was previously the record caps holder for Gibraltar U21 with 18 caps, broken by Dylan Borge in November 2023. He made his senior debut on 16 June 2023, in a UEFA Euro 2024 qualifying match against France, which finished as a 0–3 loss.

== Personal life ==
El Hmidi is Muslim. While representing Gibraltar during Ramadan in 2025, he discussed balancing fasting with his preparations for international matches.
