= John-Paul Duarte =

Gibraltarian footballer (born 1986)

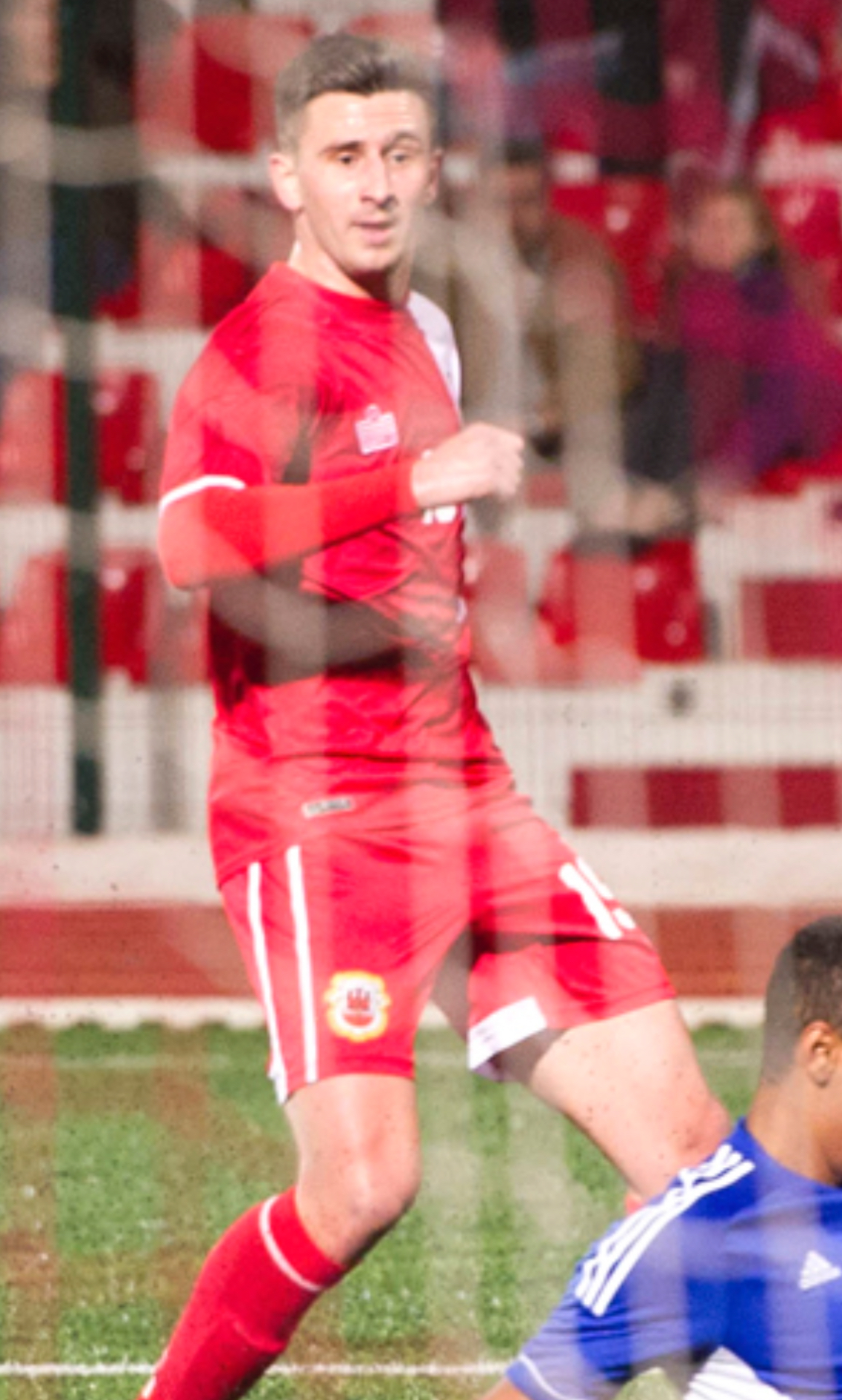
- Duarte in 2014 with Gibraltar

Personal information
- Full name: John-Paul Duarte
- Date of birth: 13 December 1986 (age 39)
- Place of birth: Gibraltar
- Position: Forward

Team information
- Current team: Mons Calpe
- Number: 14

Youth career
- 2002–2006: Lincoln Red Imps

Senior career*
Years	Team	Apps	(Gls)
2006–2013	Lincoln Red Imps (Note: Pre-UEFA. Gibraltar football stats before 2013 are unknown)	–	(–)
2013–2015	Lincoln Red Imps	32	(25)
2015–2016	Manchester 62	12	(1)
2016–2019	St Joseph's	55	(24)
2019–2020	Bruno's Magpies	7	(3)
2021–	Mons Calpe	26	(11)

International career^{‡}
2014–2017	Gibraltar	11	(0)
- * Club domestic league appearances and goals as of 30 March 2024 ‡ National team caps and goals as of 6 September 2017

John-Paul Duarte (born 13 December 1986) is a Gibraltarian footballer who plays for Gibraltar National League side Mons Calpe and the Gibraltar national team, where he plays as a forward.

== Club career ==
Duarte made his debut in 2006 for Lincoln Red Imps, becoming a regular in the side that dominated football in Gibraltar for over a decade. However, injuries soon cost him a regular place in the side and in 2015 he moved to Manchester 62. Another injury plagued season ensued as Manchester 62 struggled to get out of mid-table, and after one season at the club he moved on to St Joseph's, where his form drastically improved, earning him a recall to the Gibraltar national football team in March 2017. In summer 2019 he joined Bruno's Magpies - he had originally agreed terms with Gibraltar United before reported financial issues hit the club, causing the deal to collapse.

== International career ==
Duarte was first called up to the Gibraltar senior team in February 2014 for friendlies against Faroe Islands and Estonia on 1 and 5 March 2014. He made his international début with Gibraltar on 1 March 2014 in a 4-1 home loss with the Faroe Islands. His second appearance came a 2-0 home loss to Estonia on 5 March 2014.

=== International statistics ===
As of 5 March 2014.

National team	Season	Apps	Goals
Gibraltar	2014	4	0
Total		4	0
