= Mitchell Gibson =

Gibraltarian footballer (born 2001)

Personal information
- Full name: Mitchell Dean Gibson
- Date of birth: 8 October 2001 (age 25)
- Place of birth: Gibraltar
- Position: Midfielder

Team information
- Current team: St Joseph's
- Number: 12

Youth career
- Europa

Senior career*
Years	Team	Apps	(Gls)
2020–2024	Europa	41	(5)
2021–2022	→ Glacis United (loan)	12	(2)
2024–	St Joseph's	15	(3)

International career^{‡}
2021	Gibraltar U21	3	(0)
2025–	Gibraltar	1	(0)
- * Club domestic league appearances and goals as of 25 October 2026 ‡ National team caps and goals as of 6 June 2025

Mitchell Dean Gibson (born 8 October 2001) is a Gibraltarian footballer who plays as a midfielder for St Joseph's and the Gibraltar national team.

== Club career ==
Gibson started his career at Europa, first making his breakthrough in the 2020–21 season. After 4 years with the Green Machine, including one season on loan at Glacis United, Gibson moved to league rivals St Joseph's 9 June 2024.

== International career ==
Gibson made his senior debut for Gibraltar on 6 June 2025, coming on as a substitute against Croatia.

== Career statistics ==
As of match played 25 October 2026

Appearances and goals by club, season and competition
Club	Season	League			National Cup		League Cup		Continental		Other		Total	
Club	Season	Division	Apps	Goals	Apps	Goals	Apps	Goals	Apps	Goals	Apps	Goals	Apps	Goals
Europa	2020–21	Gibraltar National League	11	0	1	0	—		1	0	—		13	0
Europa	2022–23	Gibraltar Football League	11	3	1	0	—		0	0	1	0	13	3
Europa	2023–24	Gibraltar Football League	19	2	4	1	—		0	0	—		23	3
Europa	Total		41	5	6	1	—		1	0	1	0	49	6
Glacis United (loan)	2021–22	Gibraltar National League	12	2	0	0	—		—		—		12	2
St Joseph's	2024–25	Gibraltar Football League	9	3	2	1	—		0	0	—		11	4
St Joseph's	2025–26	Gibraltar Football League	3	0	0	0	—		0	0	—		3	0
St Joseph's	2026–27	Gibraltar Football League	3	0	0	0	—		0	0	—		3	0
St Joseph's	Total		15	3	2	1	—		0	0	0	0	17	3
Career total			68	10	8	2	0	0	1	0	1	0	78	12

=== International ===
As of match played 6 June 2025.

Appearances and goals by national team and year
National team	Year	Apps	Goals
Gibraltar U21
Gibraltar U21	2021	3	0
Total		3	0
Gibraltar
Gibraltar	2025	1	0
Total		1	0
