= Dylan Borge =

Gibraltarian footballer (born 2003)

Personal information
- Full name: Dylan Borge
- Date of birth: 15 October 2003 (age 23)
- Place of birth: Gibraltar
- Height: 1.75 m (5 ft 9 in)
- Position: Striker

Team information
- Current team: Mons Calpe
- Number: 19

Youth career
- –2020: Lincoln Red Imps

Senior career*
Years	Team	Apps	(Gls)
2019–2020	Lincoln Red Imps	1	(0)
2020–2023	Europa	56	(21)
2023–2024	St Joseph's	21	(3)
2024–2026	FC Magpies	42	(6)
2026–	Mons Calpe	9	(1)

International career^{‡}
2019	Gibraltar U17	3	(0)
2019–2024	Gibraltar U21	25	(2)
2021–	Gibraltar	14	(2)
- * Club domestic league appearances and goals as of 20 November 2026 ‡ National team caps and goals as of 18 November 2026

Dylan Borge (born 15 October 2003) is a Gibraltarian semi-professional footballer who plays as a striker for Mons Calpe and the Gibraltar national football team.

On 7 July 2023, Borge signed a contract with St Joseph's.

== International career ==
Borge made his international debut for Gibraltar on 27 March 2021 in a 2022 FIFA World Cup qualifying game against Montenegro. At 17 years and 163 days, he became the youngest Gibraltar international of the UEFA era, breaking the record set by Jayce Olivero in March 2016 by 101 days - a record that lasted until Luca Scanlon made his debut in 2025.

== Career statistics ==
=== International ===
As of match played 16 November 2026

Gibraltar
Year	Apps	Goals
2021	1	0
2022	0	0
2023	0	0
2024	0	0
2025	4	0
2026	9	2
Total	14	2

International goals

Scores and results list Gibraltar's goal tally first.

List of international goals scored by James Scanlon
No.	Date	Venue	Opponent	Score	Result	Competition
1	6 June 2026	Europa Point Stadium, Europa Point, Gibraltar	Cayman Islands	2–1	4–1	Friendly
2	5 October 2026	Rheinpark Stadion, Vaduz, Liechtenstein	Liechtenstein	2–0	2–0	Friendly

== Honours ==
Europa

- Pepe Reyes Cup: 2021

FCB Magpies

- Rock Cup: 2024–25
