= Federico Villar =

Argentine footballer

Personal information
- Full name: Federico Martin Villar
- Date of birth: 24 November 1985 (age 40)
- Place of birth: Buenos Aires, Argentina
- Height: 1.88 m (6 ft 2 in)
- Position: Defender

Team information
- Current team: FC Magpies
- Number: 24

Senior career*
| Years | Team | Apps | (Gls) |
| 2007–2008 | San Martín de Burzaco | 12 | (1) |
| 2008–2009 | Spartak Varna | 1 | (0) |
| 2009 | Alianza de Arteaga | 28 | (2) |
| 2010 | Argentino de Rosario | 6 | (0) |
| 2010–2012 | Boca Río Gallegos | | |
| 2012–2013 | Central Córdoba | 24 | (1) |
| 2013–2018 | Boca Río Gallegos | | |
| 2018–2019 | Mons Calpe | 36 | (0) |
| 2019–2023 | St Joseph's | 52 | (2) |
| 2023–2024 | Manchester 62 | 20 | (0) |
| 2024– | FCB Magpies | 30 | (3) |
- * Club domestic league appearances and goals as of 5 March 2026

Federico Martin Villar (born November 24, 1985) is an Argentine football defender for FC Magpies.

Villar started his career in the lower divisions of Argentine football with Club Atlético Mitre. In January 2008, Villar signed with PFC Spartak Varna in Bulgaria.
