= Jamie Coombes =

Gibraltarian footballer (born 1996)

Personal information
- Full name: James Timothy Barry Coombes
- Date of birth: 27 May 1996 (age 30)
- Place of birth: Gibraltar
- Height: 1.72 m (5 ft 8 in)
- Position: Striker

Team information
- Current team: St Joseph's
- Number: 17

Youth career
- St Joseph's

Senior career*
Years	Team	Apps	(Gls)
2013–2015	College Europa	9	(1)
2015–2016	Manchester 62	11	(4)
2017	Undy Athletic	6	(0)
2017–2021	Lincoln Red Imps	21	(3)
2017–2018	→ Undy Athletic (loan)	3	(1)
2018–2019	→ West Didsbury & Chorlton (loan)	13	(1)
2021–2024	Bruno's Magpies	49	(9)
2024	Rydalmere Lions	7	(0)
2024–2025	FCB Magpies	11	(0)
2025–2026	Coniston	13	(4)
2026–	St Joseph's	10	(2)

International career^{‡}
2013–2014	Gibraltar U-19	6	(1)
2017–2018	Gibraltar U-21	4	(0)
2015–	Gibraltar	33	(0)
- * Club domestic league appearances and goals as of 21 November 2026 ‡ National team caps and goals as of 6 June 2026

James Timothy Barry Coombes (born 27 May 1996) is a Gibraltarian footballer who currently plays for St Joseph's and the Gibraltar national team. Mainly a striker, he can also play as an attacking midfielder. His cousin is defender Lee Coombes.

== Club career ==
Coombes began his career with cousin Lee at Europa, playing for them in their first season in the UEFA Europa League. Despite attracting the attention of several clubs from England and France, Coombes opted to sign for Manchester 62 in 2015, scoring four goals in an ultimately unsuccessful season at the club. He left in summer 2016 to study in Cardiff, and in February 2017 signed for Welsh Football League Division One team Undy Athletic while continuing his studies. On 17 August 2017, he signed for Lincoln Red Imps, and was immediately loaned back to Undy for the coming season. After a stop-start season plagued by injury, he scored his first Undy goal on 16 December, the winner in a 3–2 victory against Pen-y-Bont.

In August 2018, he moved to West Didsbury & Chorlton, joining up with compatriot Jack Sergeant, with whom he shared a house in Hulme while studying business management at Manchester Metropolitan University. Although he signed in August, he did not receive clearance until October. He scored his first goal for West on 15 December 2018, at Whitchurch Alport to give his side the lead in a 2–0 win. He re-joined Lincoln Red Imps on 20 June 2019. He scored his first goal for the club in an 8–0 win over a depleted Glacis United side on 22 August.

In summer 2021 he signed for Bruno's Magpies, scoring his first goal on 20 November, the decisive goal in a 3–2 win over Lions Gibraltar. However, he left the club in January 2024 to pursue opportunities outside Gibraltar. After spending the 2025 season in Australia with Coniston, Coombes returned to Gibraltar on 23 January 2026 to sign for St Joseph's.

== International career ==
Coombes was first called up to the Gibraltar senior team in May 2015 for matches against Croatia and Germany. He made his international début with Gibraltar on 7 June 2015 in a 4–0 loss to Croatia. He returned to the senior team in March 2017 against Bosnia, yet did not play, however he remained in the squad in June 2017 against Cyprus, while simultaneously receiving his first call up for the newly formed Gibraltar national under-21 football team.

== Career statistics ==
As of 6 June 2026

Appearances and goals by national team and year
National team	Year	Apps	Goals
Gibraltar	2015	3	0
Gibraltar	2016	2	0
Gibraltar	2017	4	0
Gibraltar	2018	2	0
Gibraltar	2019	5	0
Gibraltar	2020	2	0
Gibraltar	2021	4	0
Gibraltar	2022	4	0
Gibraltar	2023	6	0
Gibraltar	2024	0	0
Gibraltar	2025	0	0
Gibraltar	2026	1	0
Total		33	0
