= Julian Valarino =

Gibraltarian footballer

Personal information
- Full name: Julian John Valarino
- Date of birth: 23 June 2000 (age 26)
- Place of birth: Gibraltar
- Positions: Right midfielder; right-back

Team information
- Current team: St Joseph's
- Number: 3

Youth career
- 2016–2019: Lincoln Red Imps

Senior career*
Years	Team	Apps	(Gls)
2019–2025	Lincoln Red Imps	37	(1)
2021	→ Lynx (loan)	10	(1)
2021–2022	→ St Joseph's (loan)	15	(2)
2025–2026	Europa	13	(1)
2026–	St Joseph's	7	(1)

International career^{‡}
2015–2016	Gibraltar U17	5	(1)
2016–2017	Gibraltar U19	4	(0)
2019–2022	Gibraltar U21	5	(0)
2021–	Gibraltar	40	(1)
- * Club domestic league appearances and goals as of 21 November 2026 ‡ National team caps and goals as of 18 November 2026

Julian John Valarino (born 23 June 2000) is a Gibraltarian footballer who plays as a midfielder for Gibraltarian club St Joseph's and the Gibraltar national team.

== Club career ==
Valarino made his debut at Lincoln Red Imps in 2019, but remained in the youth team for the next two years until he joined Lynx on loan in January 2021. His performances earned him his first national team call-up, with one goal in nine appearances. In August 2021, he again went out on loan, this time to St Joseph's. He scored a brace on his debut, a 4–1 win over his former side Lynx, on 16 October 2021.

In 2025, he left Lincoln Red Imps and joined rivals Europa. He made his debut on 22 August 2025 against Mons Calpe.

== International career ==
Valarino made his international debut for Gibraltar on 24 March 2021 against Norway.

== Career statistics ==
=== International ===
As of match played 16 November 2026

Gibraltar
Year	Apps	Goals
2021	12	0
2022	8	0
2023	2	0
2024	2	0
2025	7	0
2026	9	1
Total	40	1

International goals

Scores and results list Gibraltar's goal tally first.

List of international goals scored by James Scanlon
No.	Date	Venue	Opponent	Score	Result	Competition
1	6 June 2026	Europa Point Stadium, Europa Point, Gibraltar	Cayman Islands	3–1	4–1	Friendly
