= Gabri Cardozo =

Uruguayan footballer (born 1997)

Personal information
- Full name: Gabriel Sebastián Cardozo Tomás
- Date of birth: 27 December 1997 (age 28)
- Place of birth: Montevideo, Uruguay
- Position: Centre back

Team information
- Current team: Lincoln Red Imps
- Number: 5

Youth career
- Taraguilla
- 2013–2016: Málaga

Senior career*
Years	Team	Apps	(Gls)
2016–2017	Málaga B	14	(2)
2017–2018	Oviedo B	19	(0)
2018–2020	Extremadura B	46	(4)
2020	Extremadura	1	(0)
2020–2021	Pobla Mafumet	20	(1)
2021–2023	Montijo	47	(4)
2023–2026	St Joseph's	61	(8)
2026–	Lincoln Red Imps	6	(1)
- * Club domestic league appearances and goals as of 22 November 2026

Gabriel Sebastián "Gabri" Cardozo Tomás (born 27 December 1997) is an Uruguayan footballer who plays as a central defender for Gibraltar Football League club Lincoln Red Imps.

== Club career ==
Born in Montevideo, Cardozo moved to Cádiz, Andalusia at early age, and joined Málaga CF's youth setup in 2013, aged 15. He made his senior debut with the reserves on 28 August 2016, starting in a 1–0 Tercera División home win against UD Ciudad de Torredonjimeno.

Cardozo scored his first senior goal on 11 September 2016, netting his team's second in a 4–1 home routing of UD Maracena. The following 31 August, after featuring sparingly, he moved to another reserve team, Real Oviedo Vetusta also in the fourth division.

On 23 August 2018, Cardozo joined Extremadura UD and was assigned to the B-side also in the fourth tier. He made his first team debut on 12 July 2020, coming on as a late substitute for Sabit Abdulai in a 3–2 away defeat of Deportivo de La Coruña in the Segunda División championship.

On 2 October 2020, Cardozo moved to another reserve team, CF Pobla de Mafumet also in division four. The next season he moved to UD Montijo. After 2 seasons there, he transferred once more, to St Joseph's.

== Personal life ==
Cardozo's father Gerardo was also a footballer. He is also the godson of Walter Pandiani.
