= Jeff Wood (footballer) =

English footballer and manager

Personal information
- Full name: Jeffrey Reginald Wood
- Date of birth: 4 February 1954 (age 72)
- Place of birth: Islington, England
- Position: Goalkeeper

Team information
- Current team: Europa (head of coaching)

Youth career
- Cambridge United

Senior career*
| Years | Team | Apps | (Gls) |
| 1975–1982 | Charlton Athletic | 147 | (0) |
| 1982–1983 | Colchester United | 0 | (0) |
| 1983–1984 | HJK Helsinki | 54 | |
| 1984–1985 | Exeter City | 33 | (0) |
| 1985–1986 | Happy Valley | 44 | |
| 1986–1987 | Rabat Ajax | 21 | (0) |
| 1987–1990 | Grankulla IFK | 44 | (0) |
| 1990 | Gnistan | 74 | |
| 1992-1993 | Wivenhoe Town F.C. | 43 | |
| Total | | 474 | (0) |

Managerial career
- 1996–1999: Brighton & Hove Albion (assistant)
- 1999: Brighton & Hove Albion
- 2001–2002: Sliema Wanderers
- 2014–2015: Lions Gibraltar
- 2015: Gibraltar (assistant)
- 2015–2018: Gibraltar
- 2018: Gibraltar U-17
- 2019: Manchester 62
- * Club domestic league appearances and goals

Jeffrey Reginald Wood (born 4 February 1954) is an English former professional footballer who played as a goalkeeper. He is currently the head of coaching for Europa, and was also goalkeeping coach for the Wales U19 and Wales U21 teams.

== Career ==
=== Playing ===
After being released as a youth player by Colchester United, Wood started his professional career at Charlton Athletic, spending seven seasons at the club and winning promotion to the Second Division in the 1980–81 season, before moving back to Colchester for one season. He left without making an appearance, having been kept out of the team by Mike Walker, and moved to Finnish club HJK Helsinki in 1982. He spent two seasons there and then returned to England, signing for Fourth Division side Exeter City for the 1984–85 season. Wood then moved to Hong Kong side Happy Valley, whom he played for in two spells, firstly on loan during Finnish close season then full campaign, before returning to Exeter City before moving to Malta for two-and-a-half seasons winning two League championships and two FA Cups with Rabat Ajax. He spent the final years of his full-time playing career back in Finland with three seasons each at Grankulla IFK and Gnistan.

In December 1996, Wood was appointed by his former Charlton teammate Steve Gritt as assistant manager at Brighton & Hove Albion in the Third Division. This came in one of the lowest points in Brighton's history, with the club only narrowly avoiding relegation to non-League football in the 1996–97 and then finishing the next season in second-bottom position, albeit 15 points clear of relegated Doncaster Rovers. In January 1999, with the club embroiled in a financial crisis, he was appointed as Brighton's manager until the end of the 1998–99 season after Brian Horton left to take over at Port Vale. Wood remained unbeaten in his first three games, but then picked up only one point in the club's next ten games and was sacked on 9 April 1999, with the club battling relegation.

=== Managerial ===
Wood spent time coaching in the United States, before joining Chesham United as assistant manager in 2000. Following the abrupt departure of Chesham's manager Jon Kendall to St Albans City in October 2000, Wood joined Maltese Premier League side Sliema Wanderers as a coach. He remained with the club for two seasons as they finished as runners-up in both the league and Maltese Cup.

Wood joined Isthmian League side Harlow Town as a coach soon after and, in June 2003, rejected the offer to manage their divisional rivals Chesham United.

Wood earned a UEFA 'A' Pro Licence and was appointed to manage Charlton Athletic's European Soccer School in southern Spain in 2004, later financing and maintaining it himself after Charlton withdrew their funding in 2006.

Wood was employed as Norwich City's goalkeeping coach in February 2011, with the club winning promotion to the Premier League two months later. He left at the end of the 2011–12 season.

He was appointed as the goalkeeping coach for the Wales U19 and Wales U21 teams and, on 30 July 2013, Wood was appointed goalkeeping coach at Conference Premier side Luton Town. He left Luton in May 2014 to join Gibraltar Premier Division side Lions Gibraltar as head coach. His first season in charge saw the club finish bottom of the league.

In July 2015, he was appointed manager of Gibraltar.

In February 2018 Jeff Wood resigned as manager. After spells managing the Gibraltar under-17 side, he took over at Manchester 62 on 19 June 2019, assisted by Juan Francisco Fernández Molina.

== Managerial statistics ==
As of match played 10 October 2017.

| Team | From | To | Record | | | | |
| Team | From | To | G | W | D | L | Win % |
|---|---|---|---|---|---|---|---|
| Brighton & Hove Albion | January 1999 | April 1999 | 13 | 2 | 2 | 9 | 15.38 |
| Sliema Wanderers | 2001 | 2002 | | | | | |
| Lions Gibraltar | 2014 | 2015 | 27 | 3 | 7 | 17 | 11.11 |
| Gibraltar | 2015 | 2018 | 17 | 0 | 1 | 16 | 0.00 |
| Manchester 62 | 2019 | 2019 | 4 | 1 | 1 | 2 | 25.00 |

- No available statistics for Sliema Wanderers.
