= Erin Barnett =

British association football player (born 1996)

Personal information
- Full name: Erin Anthony Barnett
- Date of birth: 2 September 1996 (age 30)
- Place of birth: Gibraltar
- Position: Defender

Team information
- Current team: St Joseph's
- Number: 14

Senior career*
Years	Team	Apps	(Gls)
2013–2015	Lions Gibraltar	28	(1)
2016	Lions Gibraltar	0	(0)
2016–2019	Gibraltar United	66	(0)
2019	Boca Gibraltar	1	(0)
2020	Marine	0	(0)
2020–	St Joseph's	63	(4)

International career^{‡}
2013–2014	Gibraltar U-19	7	(0)
2015	Gibraltar development squad	4	(0)
2017–2018	Gibraltar U-21	3	(0)
2015–2021	Gibraltar	26	(0)
- * Club domestic league appearances and goals as of 23 October 2024 ‡ National team caps and goals as of 13 November 2021

Erin Anthony Barnett (born 2 September 1996) is a Gibraltarian footballer who plays for St Joseph's and the Gibraltar national team. He is mainly a centre back player.

== Club career ==
Barnett emerged from the Lions Gibraltar youth set up in 2013, at the age of 16, and quickly became a regular fixture in the side. He was released by the club in 2015, however. After a year without a club, he re-signed in summer 2016. Before the transfer window closed, he moved again as he was signed by Gibraltar United. After Gibraltar United were expelled from the league in August 2019, he joined Boca Gibraltar, making his debut on 13 August against Manchester 62. However, he only played one game for the club before moving to the UK to study. After receiving international clearance, he signed for Marine on 11 January 2020.

== International career ==
Having previously played at under-19 level and representing a development squad at the 2015 Island Games, Barnett was first called up to the Gibraltar senior team in 2014, as an unused substitute against Malta. He made his debut at the age of 17 in September 2015 in the matches against Republic of Ireland and Poland. He made his international début with Gibraltar on 4 September 2015 in game with Republic of Ireland.

=== International statistics ===
As of 13 November 2021.

National team	Season	Apps	Goals
Gibraltar	2015	3	0
Gibraltar	2016	4	0
Gibraltar	2017	4	0
Gibraltar	2018	3	0
Gibraltar	2019	5	0
Gibraltar	2020	3	0
Gibraltar	2021	4	0
Total		26	0

== Honours ==
St Joseph's

- Pepe Reyes Cup: 2024
