= Emmanuel Ocran =

Ghanaian footballer (born 1996)

Personal information
- Date of birth: February 19, 1996 (age 30)
- Place of birth: Takoradi, Western Region, Ghana
- Height: 5 ft 6 in (1.68 m)
- Position: Winger

Team information
- Current team: Manchester 62
- Number: 10

Senior career*
Years	Team	Apps	(Gls)
2009–2012	Sammin Football Club		
2013–2017	All Stars	70	(10)
2017	→ Real Monarchs (loan)	6	(0)
2018–2019	Karela United FC	4	(0)
2019–2022	Dreams FC	38	(4)
2021–2022	→ Lincoln Red Imps (loan)	5	(1)
2022–2023	Bruno's Magpies	9	(0)
2023	→ Manchester 62 (loan)	7	(4)
2023–	Manchester 62	40	(5)

International career
2011–2012	Ghana B	2	(0)
2019	Ghana	1	(0)
- * Club domestic league appearances and goals as of 26 April 2025

Emmanuel Ocran (born February 19, 1996) is a Ghanaian footballer who plays for Gibraltar Football League side Manchester 62.

== Club career ==
Emmanuel Ocran was part of the Wa All Stars team that won the 2016 Ghana Premier League. On 15 February 2017, Ocran joined United Soccer League side Real Monarchs on loan from All Stars. In September 2019, he moved back to Ghana and joined Ghana Premier League side Dreams FC.

On 17 July 2021, he joined Gibraltar National League side Lincoln Red Imps F.C. on a year-long loan.

== International career ==
Ocran was called up to the Ghana national team in August 2016 for their 2017 Africa Cup of Nations qualifiers.

== Honours ==
=== Club ===
Wa All Stars

- Ghana Premier League: 2016
- Ghana Super Cup: 2017

=== Individual ===
- Kuntu Blankson's Player of the Season: 2015–2016
