= Alain Pons =

Gibraltarian footballer

Personal information
- Full name: Alain Anthony Pons
- Date of birth: 16 September 1995 (age 31)
- Place of birth: Gibraltar
- Position: Midfielder

Team information
- Current team: St Joseph's
- Number: 21

Youth career
- 200?–2011: Atlético Zabal
- 2011–2014: AD Taraguilla

College career
Years	Team	Apps	(Gls)
2014–2017	UCLan Men's FC	–	(–)

Senior career*
Years	Team	Apps	(Gls)
2012–2014	AD Taraguilla	28	(1)
2014–2015	Lincoln Red Imps	10	(0)
2016–2017	Gibraltar United	0	(0)
2017–2019	Lincoln Red Imps	17	(1)
2019–	St Joseph's	132	(3)

International career^{‡}
2013–2015	Gibraltar U19	5	(0)
2015	Gibraltar development squad	4	(1)
2017–	Gibraltar	28	(0)
- * Club domestic league appearances and goals as of 21 November 2026 ‡ National team caps and goals as of 27 September 2026

Alain Anthony Pons (born 16 September 1995) is a Gibraltarian football midfielder who currently plays for St Joseph's and the Gibraltar national football team.

== Club career ==
Pons came through the youth ranks at AD Taraguilla in Spain, breaking into the senior team in 2013 before moving to his home country of Gibraltar to sign for Lincoln Red Imps. While studying at University of Central Lancashire, he remained contracted to Lincoln, occasionally playing for the first team while also representing UCLan's football team. Returning to Gibraltar after his studies, he signed for Gibraltar United, but this stay would be short lived as he would re-sign for Lincoln in January 2017. Again, he would feature primarily in the reserve teams, appearing on the bench several times but not playing. In August 2019, Pons signed for St Joseph's. On 4 May 2023, Pons extended his contract with St Joseph's until 30 June 2024.

== International career ==
Pons has been capped 5 times for the Gibraltar national under-19 football team, making his debut in 2013. In 2015, he played for a development squad at the 2015 Island Games, scoring once as Gibraltar finished a disappointing 10th place. Having been called up to several senior squads without playing, he finally made his debut as a substitute for the senior team on August 31, 2017, in an eventual 9–0 defeat to Belgium.

== Career statistics ==
=== International ===
As of 27 September 2026

International statistics
National team	Season	Apps	Goals
Gibraltar	2017	3	0
Gibraltar	2018	6	0
Gibraltar	2019	9	0
Gibraltar	2020	3	0
Gibraltar	2021	5	0
Gibraltar	2022	0	0
Gibraltar	2023	0	0
Gibraltar	2024	0	0
Gibraltar	2025	0	0
Gibraltar	2026	2	0
Total		28	0

== Honours ==
Lincoln Red Imps

- Gibraltar Premier Division: 2014–15, 2017–18, 2018–19
- Rock Cup: 2015

St Joseph's

- Pepe Reyes Cup: 2024
