= Javi Forján =

Spanish footballer (born 1995)

Personal information
- Full name: Javier Alejandro Forján Gutiérrez
- Date of birth: 5 May 1995 (age 31)
- Place of birth: Jerez de la Frontera, Spain
- Height: 1.78 m (5 ft 10 in)
- Position: Forward

Team information
- Current team: St Joseph's
- Number: 7

Youth career
- Xerez

Senior career*
Years	Team	Apps	(Gls)
2013–2014	Xerez	2	(1)
2013–2014	Arcos	18	(2)
2014–2015	San Fernando	7	(1)
2015	Arcos	17	(6)
2015	Sanluqueño	6	(1)
2016	Arcos	10	(1)
2016–2017	Lebrijana	35	(9)
2017–2018	Albacete B	21	(4)
2018	Albacete	1	(0)
2018–2019	Los Barrios	38	(25)
2019–2021	Linense	21	(0)
2021	→ Xerez (loan)	15	(3)
2021–2022	Ciudad de Lucena	29	(9)
2022–2023	Juventud Torremolinos	14	(2)
2023–2024	Antoniano	21	(1)
2024–2025	FCB Magpies	23	(9)
2025–	St Joseph's	31	(19)
- * Club domestic league appearances and goals as of 21 November 2026

Javier Alejandro "Javi" Forján Gutiérrez (born 5 May 1995) is a Spanish footballer who plays for Gibraltarian club St Joseph's as a forward.

== Club career ==
Born in La Barca de la Florida, Jerez de la Frontera, Cádiz, Andalusia, Forján was a Xerez CD youth graduate. On 8 June 2013, while still a youth, he made his first team debut by starting and scoring the first in a 2–1 Segunda División home win against FC Barcelona B, as his side was already relegated.

Forján left the club in October 2013, and subsequently signed for Arcos CF in Tercera División. The following 6 July he joined fellow league team San Fernando CD, but returned to his previous club on 16 January 2015 after terminating his contract.

On 9 July 2015, Forján agreed to a deal with Atlético Sanluqueño CF, still in the fourth division. On 5 August of the following year, after a short spell back at Arcos, he moved to UB Lebrijana.

In July 2017 Forjá signed with Albacete Balompié, being assigned to the reserves still in the fourth tier. He made his first team debut the following 14 January, coming on as a late substitute for Jérémie Bela in a 2–1 home win against Granada CF for the second level championship.
