= Youri Loen =

Dutch footballer (born 1991)

Personal information
- Date of birth: 27 January 1991 (age 35)
- Place of birth: Nijmegen, Netherlands
- Height: 1.77 m (5 ft 10 in)
- Position: Midfielder

Team information
- Current team: FCB Magpies (head coach)

Youth career
- SV Orion
- 2001–2010: NEC

Senior career*
Years	Team	Apps	(Gls)
2010–2014	NEC	6	(0)
2014	→ Dordrecht (loan)	7	(1)
2014–2016	Sparta Rotterdam	23	(3)
2015–2016	→ Fortuna Sittard (loan)	32	(2)
2016–2018	Emmen	60	(7)
2018–2020	Almere City	63	(8)
2020–2021	Doxa Drama	0	(0)
2021	FC Haka	9	(0)
2022	Mosta	6	(0)
2023–2024	De Treffers	24	(1)
2024–2025	Glacis United	14	(3)
2025	FCB Magpies	3	(0)
Total		247	(25)

Managerial career
- 2025–: FCB Magpies
- * Club domestic league appearances and goals

Youri Loen (born 27 January 1991) is a Dutch football coach and former player who is head coach for Gibraltar Football League club FCB Magpies.

== Career ==
Born in Nijmegen, after playing with amateur club SV Orion, Loen began his career with the youth team of hometown club NEC in 2001, and later played for Dordrecht, Sparta Rotterdam, Fortuna Sittard, FC Emmen and Almere City.

After two seasons with Almere City, in which he scored 8 goals and made 15 assists in 65 games, he was told he was no longer wanted by the club. He left the club at the end of June 2020, and returned to former club SV Orion in July 2020, as well as a second amateur club Brakkenstein, to train in order to maintain fitness.

Later that month he began training with TOP Oss. He remained training with TOP Oss in October 2020, although the club said they would not be signing him to a contract. Later that month he signed for Greek club Doxa Drama.

On 26 January 2021, Loen signed for Finnish club FC Haka.

On 19 January 2022, he joined Mosta in Malta.

After a stint back in the Netherlands, Loen moved to Gibraltar in August 2024 with Glacis United, making his debut on 25 August in a 2–1 defeat to Europa. He moved again on 9 January 2025, joining FCB Magpies. He was listed as head coach for the club in July 2025 for their 2025–26 UEFA Conference League campaign.
