= Bradley Banda =

Gibraltarian footballer

Personal information
- Full name: Bradley James Banda
- Date of birth: 20 January 1998 (age 28)
- Place of birth: Gibraltar
- Height: 1.86 m (6 ft 1 in)
- Position: Goalkeeper

Team information
- Current team: St Joseph's
- Number: 1

Youth career
- Lions Gibraltar

Senior career*
Years	Team	Apps	(Gls)
2013–2014	Lions Gibraltar	8	(0)
2014–2015	Manchester 62	1	(0)
2015–2016	Lincoln Red Imps	0	(0)
2016–2018	Team Solent	45	(0)
2018–2019	Glacis United	0	(0)
2019–2021	Lynx	41	(0)
2021–2023	Europa	21	(0)
2023–	St Joseph's	81	(0)

International career^{‡}
2013–2014	Gibraltar U17	6	(0)
2015–2016	Gibraltar U19	6	(0)
2017–2020	Gibraltar U21	13	(0)
2021–	Gibraltar	23	(0)
- * Club domestic league appearances and goals as of 21 November 2026 ‡ National team caps and goals as of 27 September 2026

Bradley James Banda (born 20 January 1998) is a Gibraltarian professional association football player, who currently plays as a goalkeeper for St Joseph's and the Gibraltar national football team.

== International career ==
Banda earned his first senior call-up to the Gibraltar national football team in March 2018, while playing for Team Solent. On 11 October 2021, he made his international debut in a 6–0 defeat against the Netherlands, saving a penalty from Memphis Depay. He kept his first senior international clean sheet in his second game, a 0-0 draw against Grenada on 23 March 2022.

== Career statistics ==
=== International ===
As of match played 27 September 2026

Gibraltar
Year	Apps	Goals
2021	1	0
2022	4	0
2023	0	0
2024	8	0
2025	6	0
2026	4	0
Total	23	0

== Honours ==
St Joseph's

- Pepe Reyes Cup: 2024

== Personal life ==
Outside of football, Banda works as a special education teacher at St Martin's School in Gibraltar.
