= Haig Oundjian =

English figure skater (b.1948)

Personal information
- Full name: Haig Bertrand Oundjian
- Born: 16 May 1949 (age 77) Purley, London, England, United Kingdom

Figure skating career
- Country: United Kingdom
- Retired: 1972
Medal record
Representing United Kingdom
European Championships
Bronze medal – third place	1971 Zürich	Men's singles

Haig Bertrand Oundjian (born 16 May 1949) is an English former figure skater. He is the 1971 European bronze medalist and a three-time British national champion. He competed at the 1968 Winter Olympics in Grenoble, placing 17th, and at the 1972 Winter Olympics in Sapporo, placing 7th.

Oundjian later served as the chairman of the National Ice Skating Association and vice-chairman of Watford F.C. In 2019 he became joint-chairman of Bruno's Magpies.

Oundjian is a father to three children, Victoria, Natalia and Kristina.

== Results ==
International
Event	67–68	68–69	69–70	70–71	71–72
Winter Olympics	17th				7th
World Championships		WD	9th	6th	WD
European Championships		6th	6th	3rd	4th
International St. Gervais			1st		
National
British Championships	2nd	1st	1st	2nd	1st
WD = Withdrew
