= Julian Del Rio =

Gibraltarian footballer

Personal information
- Full name: Julian del Río
- Date of birth: 15 February 2002 (age 24)
- Place of birth: Málaga, Spain
- Position: Forward

Team information
- Current team: FC Magpies
- Number: 10

Youth career
- –2020: Lincoln Red Imps
- 2020–2021: Córdoba

Senior career*
Years	Team	Apps	(Gls)
2019–2020	Lincoln Red Imps	18	(7)
2020–2021	Córdoba B	3	(0)
2021–	FC Magpies	38	(9)
2023–2024	→ Europa (loan)	17	(3)
2024–2025	→ Europa (loan)	15	(1)

International career^{‡}
- Gibraltar U16
2017–2018	Gibraltar U17	7	(0)
2019–2020	Gibraltar U19	6	(4)
2023–2024	Gibraltar U21	10	(0)
2025–	Gibraltar	6	(0)
- * Club domestic league appearances and goals as of 7 November 2025 ‡ National team caps and goals as of 26 March 2026

Julian Del Rio (born 15 February 2002) is a Gibraltarian footballer who plays as a forward for FC Magpies and the Gibraltar national football team.

== Club career ==
Del Rio began his career in Gibraltar with Lincoln Red Imps, before signing for Córdoba in 2020 along with compatriot Jaylan Hankins. He returned to Gibraltar after one season to join Bruno's Magpies.

== International career ==
Del Rio made his senior international debut on 4 September 2025, in a friendly against Albania. As of March 2026, he is the record goalscorer for the Gibraltar national under-19 football team with 4 goals.
