= Gibraltar national football team =

Men's national association football team representing Gibraltar

Gibraltar
- Nickname(s): Team 54; Los Llanis
- Association: Gibraltar Football Association (GFA)
- Confederation: UEFA (Europe)
- Head coach: Scott Wiseman
- Captain: Graeme Torrilla
- Most caps: Liam Walker (88)
- Top scorer: Liam Walker (8)
- Home stadium: Victoria Stadium (Under reconstruction); Europa Sports Park (Current stadium; Interim)
- FIFA code: GIB
First colours	Second colours

FIFA ranking
- Current: 200 ▲1 (18 November 2026)
- Highest: 190 (October 2018)
- Lowest: 206 (April 2017 – March 2018)

First international
- Gibraltar 0–0 Slovakia (Faro, Portugal; 19 November 2013)

Biggest win
- Gibraltar 4–0 British Virgin Islands (Europa Point, Gibraltar; 3 June 2026)

Biggest defeat
- France 14–0 Gibraltar (Nice, France; 18 November 2023)

The Gibraltar national football team represents Gibraltar in men's international football competitions, and is controlled by the Gibraltar Football Association. Gibraltar applied for full Union of European Football Associations (UEFA) membership and was accepted by the UEFA Congress in May 2013. It can therefore compete in the UEFA European Championship starting with the 2016 tournament for which the team competed in UEFA Euro 2016 qualifying Group D. On 13 May 2016, Gibraltar became a member of FIFA at the governing body's 66th Congress which was held in Mexico City. Gibraltar is the second smallest UEFA member in terms of population (only San Marino has a smaller population) and the smallest in terms of area.

Despite not being an island, Gibraltar set up its first official side for the football competition at the 1993 Island Games and has been a regular in the tournament, winning the 2007 edition.

== History ==
=== Pre-UEFA ===
Gibraltar's first unofficial national match took place against Jersey in the 1993 Island Games in the Isle of Wight, although the team had previously played friendlies versus professional and amateur clubs. The result was a 2–1 loss for the Gibraltarians. Gibraltar's largest unofficial win was 19–0 versus Sark, in Saint Martin, Guernsey, whilst their largest unofficial loss was 5–0 versus Greenland – an autonomous region of Denmark – which also took part on the Isle of Wight, in Freshwater.

==== Foundation ====
The history of the Gibraltar national football side can be traced back to April 1923, when it travelled to Spain to play club side Sevilla in a friendly; two games were played and Gibraltar lost both 2–0 and 5–0. The side also managed a draw with Real Madrid in 1949.

==== Island Games ====
Before joining UEFA, Gibraltar competed in numerous football competitions, most regularly in the Island Games.

The first competition the team entered was the 1993 Island Games, despite Gibraltar not being an island. Gibraltar lost all of its matches, scoring only one goal and finishing in last place.

They had much more success in the 1995 Island Games, which they hosted. Despite losing their opening game against Greenland, Gibraltar bounced back to record their first competitive win, against the Isle of Man. Another victory over Anglesey saw Gibraltar finish second in the group, ahead of Anglesey only on goal difference, and qualify for the semi-finals. There, they beat Jersey 1–0, before losing the final to the Isle of Wight by the same scoreline.

In the 1997 Island Games, two wins and two losses in the group stage, followed by a defeat to Shetland in a playoff, saw Gibraltar finish 6th out of 9 teams. Another poor performance in 1999 saw them finish 11th.

Island Games results improved slightly in 2001, as they came 5th, and in 2003 Gibraltar recorded their biggest win ever, defeating Sark 19–0. Other good results against Greenland and Orkney saw them finish 6th out of 12. Despite these minor successes, Gibraltar did not enter the 2005 tournament.

A football team represented Gibraltar at the 2015 edition of the games even after Gibraltar was accepted by UEFA. However, the squad was a development team composed of under-19s and over-aged players with no first team senior squad members taking part. The team was coached by John Moreno.

==== FIFI "Wild Cup" ====
In early summer 2006, Gibraltar participated in the 2006 FIFI Wild Cup where it was ranked 3rd. The tournament was an alternative World Cup for non-FIFA members, which was only held once. In Gibraltar's opening match, they drew 1–1 with the hosts, the 'Republic of St. Pauli', before beating Tibet 5–0 in their second group game to qualify for the semi-finals. There they lost 2–0 to eventual champions Turkish Republic of Northern Cyprus - following Gibraltar's games against Cyprus in 2018 FIFA World Cup qualification games in 2017, Gibraltar achieved a rare feat of playing both Cypriot national teams. In the third place playoff, Gibraltar had a rematch against St. Pauli. This time Gibraltar were able to defeat the hosts, to finish in third place out of the six teams.

==== 2008 Four Nations ====
In 2008, Gibraltar accepted an invitation to participate in The Four Nations Tournament, the most prominent senior football tournament that Gibraltar had ever participated in. The 2008 Four Nations Tournament, won by England C, was played in North Wales, and was contested between Wales Semi-Pro, England C, Scotland B and guest nation Gibraltar after Northern Ireland decided not to take part. Though Gibraltar eventually finished bottom of the group, they pushed tournament winners England C close.

=== UEFA acceptance ===
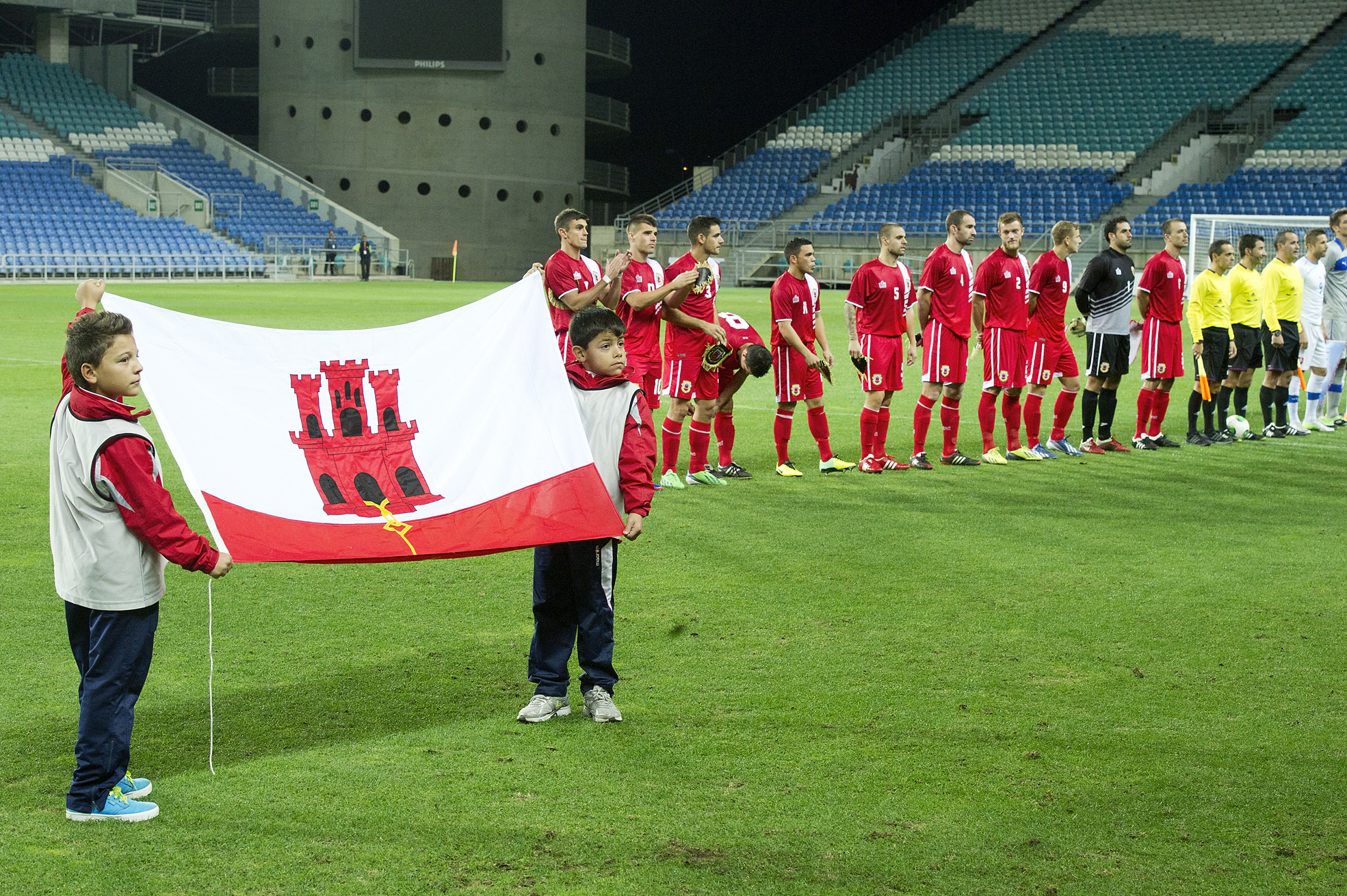
Gibraltar starting XI in UEFA debut against Slovakia

Gibraltar first applied for UEFA membership in 1999 but was rejected because of intense opposition from Spain. Spain's opposition stemmed not only from claiming ownership of the territory but from fear that Gibraltar's acceptance would set a precedent that would inspire the separatist Basque national football team and Catalan national football teams to apply for UEFA membership as well. The issue was voted on again in 2007 but only three member nations (England, Scotland and Wales) supported Gibraltar's bid after Spain threatened to withdraw Spanish teams from all UEFA competitions. UEFA then established rules, which were introduced following pressure from Spain, restricting membership to sovereign states recognised as such by the United Nations. The Gibraltar FA then went to the Court of Arbitration for Sport in 2007 and again in 2011 after an appeal and it was ruled that Gibraltar could not be refused membership because the sovereignty rules were not established until after Gibraltar's 1999 and 2007 applications. At this time, Gibraltar was named a provisional member of UEFA and was granted permission to enter national teams in under-17 and under-19 tournaments for the first time.

The GFA was accepted as a full UEFA member by resolution of the UEFA Congress held in London on 24 May 2013, with only Spain and Belarus opposed. This meant Gibraltar became the smallest UEFA member by population, behind San Marino, then Liechtenstein and the Faroe Islands. As a result of the vote, the Gibraltar national team became eligible to enter the qualification tournaments for UEFA's premier national team competition, the European Championship. The first such opportunity was the Euro 2016 qualifying campaign, which would kick off in September 2014. Following the examples of Armenia–Azerbaijan and Russia–Georgia, it was confirmed that Gibraltar and Spain would be kept apart in qualifying groups.

After being accepted into UEFA, the GFA outlined adjusted eligibility criteria for the selection of players for the national squad. To be eligible, a player must be a British passport holder who was born in Gibraltar, or has Gibraltarian parents or grandparents, or has attended school for five years locally. Former Manchester United, Derby County, Southampton and Stoke City defender Danny Higginbotham, whose uncle Allen Bula was the team manager, was eligible to be called up because of this criterion adjustment. On 18 September 2013, Higginbotham announced that he agreed in "principle" to play for Gibraltar. Recruiting of English-born players by manager Allen Bula was unpopular with some fans, and in 2015 Bula's successor Jeff Wood said he would use more home-based players and develop local talent while still searching for eligible players elsewhere.

Gibraltar's first official international match was a 0–0 friendly draw against Slovakia, on 19 November 2013 at the Estadio Algarve in Portugal. On 23 February 2014, Gibraltar was drawn in Group D for the UEFA Euro 2016 qualifying alongside Germany, Poland, Georgia, Republic of Ireland and Scotland. Initially, Gibraltar were drawn into the same group as Spain for the tournament but the previous decision to keep the two teams apart in qualifying rounds was upheld and Gibraltar was immediately moved into another group. This was their first time participating in an official European competition. In June 2014, Gibraltar recorded their first ever victory under UEFA with a 1–0 win against Malta, the goal coming from Kyle Casciaro.

==== Euro 2016 qualifying ====
On 7 September 2014, Gibraltar played their first competitive match – a UEFA Euro 2016 qualifier against Poland. Despite coming into the game with optimism and excitement, they were still massive underdogs and although the half time score was only 1–0 to Poland, it ended 7–0. On 11 October 2014, they were defeated once again by 7–0, this time by Republic of Ireland, in their second Euro 2016 qualifier. In their third match, they were beaten for the third time by Georgia 3–0.

On 29 March 2015, Gibraltar scored their first ever goal in a full international competitive match. Lee Casciaro scored against Scotland at Hampden Park, Glasgow during the first half to level the match at 1–1. However, Scotland went on to win 6–1. In July 2015, Englishman Jeff Wood was appointed manager, succeeding caretaker Dave Wilson who took over from Gibraltar's first manager Allen Bula in March 2015. Gibraltar could not repeat their performance of scoring a goal in the next two matches; losing 7–0 away against Germany and 4–0 against Republic of Ireland. On 7 September 2015, Jake Gosling scored Gibraltar's second-ever competitive goal; netting a late consolation goal as his team was defeated 8–1 by Poland. Gibraltar finished its maiden qualifying campaign last in its group with zero points. With a 0–6 defeat to Scotland in the final match of qualifying, Gibraltar allowed 56 total goals throughout qualification, surpassing San Marino's previous record of 53 in a 10-match qualification process.

=== FIFA membership ===
Having been granted UEFA membership, the GFA aimed to become a full FIFA member in time to participate in qualifiers for the upcoming 2018 World Cup. On 26 September 2014, it was announced that Gibraltar's application for FIFA membership had been denied, on the grounds that Gibraltar was not an independent country, and therefore ineligible for FIFA membership, despite multiple non-independent countries already being FIFA members. The Gibraltar Football Association announced that it planned to once again appeal to the Court of Arbitration for Sport, the same process by which they had successfully gained UEFA membership in 2013. CAS heard Gibraltar's case on 21 May 2015, at which point no time frame for a verdict was announced. A ruling was announced on 2 May 2016, nearly a year after the CAS heard Gibraltar's case. As part of the ruling, FIFA was ordered to transmit Gibraltar's application for membership to the FIFA congress which was set to take place the following week in Mexico City. Additionally, FIFA was ordered to take "all necessary steps to admit the Gibraltar Football Association as a full member of FIFA without delay." In FIFA's official statement regarding the ruling, the organization said that it expected to discuss the matter at the upcoming congress and discuss a course of action, including potentially altering the congress agenda to submit Gibraltar's application for membership.

On 13 May 2016, Gibraltar was accepted as a member of FIFA with a vote of 172 to 12 in favour. Gibraltar became FIFA's 211th member immediately after Kosovo was voted member 210.

=== Since FIFA membership ===
Gibraltar participated in World Cup qualifiers for the first time for the 2018 edition. As Gibraltar were granted FIFA membership after the qualification draw had already taken place, they were belatedly added to Group H alongside Belgium, Bosnia-Herzegovina, Greece, Estonia and Cyprus. On 6 September 2016, Liam Walker scored Gibraltar's first World Cup qualifying goal in a 1–4 defeat to Greece. Gibraltar finished bottom of Group H, losing all of their matches with a record of 3 goals scored for 47 conceded.

On 25 March 2018, Gibraltar achieved their first victory as a FIFA member in a friendly match against Latvia at Victoria Stadium, winning 1–0 thanks to a goal from Liam Walker. This was the side's second official victory and their first inside Gibraltar.

Gibraltar's first victory in an official competitive fixture came in the inaugural 2018–19 Nations League, a 1–0 win away to Armenia on 13 October 2018 with Joseph Chipolina converting a penalty in the 50th minute for the game's only goal. This was followed by a second consecutive win three days later, 2–1 at home against Liechtenstein. Gibraltar finished their Nations League campaign 3rd in Group 4 of League D.

During their qualification campaign for Euro 2020, Gibraltar lost all eight of their matches, some by heavy margins, including matches against Denmark (0–6 home and away) and Switzerland (0–4 away, 1–6 home). Gibraltar managed to score 3 goals (1 against Switzerland and 2 against Georgia) while conceding 31. They also put up a good fight against Ireland, Round of 16 finishers in the previous edition, losing by narrow margins on both occasions (0–1 home, 0–2 away). Gibraltar had suffered heavy defeats when the sides met previously during the qualifiers for Euro 2016.

In the 2020–21 Nations League, Gibraltar achieved promotion to League C by finishing an unbeaten campaign top of their group, thanks to two 1–0 wins (home to San Marino and away at Liechtenstein) and two draws (0–0 away at San Marino and 1–1 at home to Liechtenstein). In the following 2022-23 edition, Gibraltar managed an impressive draw with Bulgaria, a 1–1 result at home with captain Liam Walker equalising from the penalty spot in the 61st minute. This was Gibraltar's first point on their first appearance in League C. However, the team finished bottom of their group - losing each of their other five matches - and qualified for the two-legged relegation play-out where they faced Lithuania. Gibraltar lost each leg 0–1, and were relegated back to League D for the 2024–25 edition.

On 18 November 2023, during the UEFA Euro 2024 qualifiers, Gibraltar suffered the heaviest defeat in their history, losing 0–14 to France. The team failed to score a single goal during the campaign, finishing bottom of Group B with no points and 41 goals conceded.

On 6 June 2024, during a friendly match, a vastly re-vamped Gibraltar held Wales to a 0–0 draw at the Estádio Algarve in a result that was described as "embarrassing" for the away side, and subsequently proved to be the last game for Welsh manager Rob Page before he was sacked.

After a disappointing 2024–25 UEFA Nations League campaign, Julio Ribas stepped down as head coach on 26 February 2025. Former international Scott Wiseman was appointed as interim head coach shortly afterwards, and in May 2025 it was announced that he was to remain head coach throughout the 2026 FIFA World Cup cycle and UEFA Nations League play-offs.

== Team image ==
=== Kit suppliers ===
Kit supplier	Period
(United States) Nike	2004–2005
(Germany) Goool	2006
(Denmark) Hummel	2010–2011
(United Kingdom) Admiral	2012
(United States) Nike	2012–2013
(United Kingdom) Admiral	2013–2017
(Italy) Legea	2018–2021
(Germany) Adidas	2022–present

=== Stadium ===
Before being accepted into UEFA, the team played its home games at Victoria Stadium, the 5,000-seat national stadium of Gibraltar. There were plans to replace the stadium with a proposed 8,000-seat stadium at Europa Point, which was expected to be completed for UEFA Euro 2016 qualifying. Due to the lack of suitable facilities in Gibraltar, the team played its competitive home matches at Estádio Algarve about four hours away in Portugal, from 2013 until 2018. Former national team manager Allen Bula stated that the team would play at the stadium for "a few years" until the Europa Point Stadium was complete. Although the Victoria Stadium could not be used for qualifying matches, UEFA allowed its use for friendlies when Gibraltar chose to do so.

In December 2014, the GFA applied for an exemption from UEFA to allow for competitive matches to be held at the Victoria Stadium although it did not meet minimum requirements. The exemption was filed based upon UEFA regulations which allow for an exemption to be granted because of "hardship". At that time, UEFA said that all scheduled matches, such as those during Euro 2016 qualification, would take place in the already-determined locations but a determination would be made for future competitions. In February 2016, the Gibraltar government announced that over the previous four years numerous improvements had been made to the Victoria Stadium including the installation of approved AstroTurf and lighting which surpassed the requirements for a Category 2 stadium but did not quite meet Category 3. These improvements allowed for UEFA Champions League and Europa League matches to be played at the stadium.

In September 2015, after plans for Europa Point were abandoned, the GFA explored other sites including Lathbury Barracks, as UEFA were unwilling at the time to fund improvements to Victoria Stadium while it was government owned. In February 2016 the Government of Gibraltar announced that it expected to be presented for plans at the Lathbury site very soon. However, in 2017 a deal was agreed for the Gibraltar FA to purchase Victoria Stadium with UEFA funding, and re-develop the stadium to meet UEFA standards. The stadium was subsequently approved to host UEFA Euro 2020 qualifying games in March 2020. However, delays to the stadium redevelopment due to the COVID-19 pandemic meant that in October 2022 it was announced that Gibraltar would once again have to play competitive games in Portugal from March 2023 while their home stadium is rebuilt. In May 2024, it was confirmed that UEFA had given permission for their 2024–25 UEFA Nations League games to be hosted at the Europa Point Stadium within the Europa Sports Park.

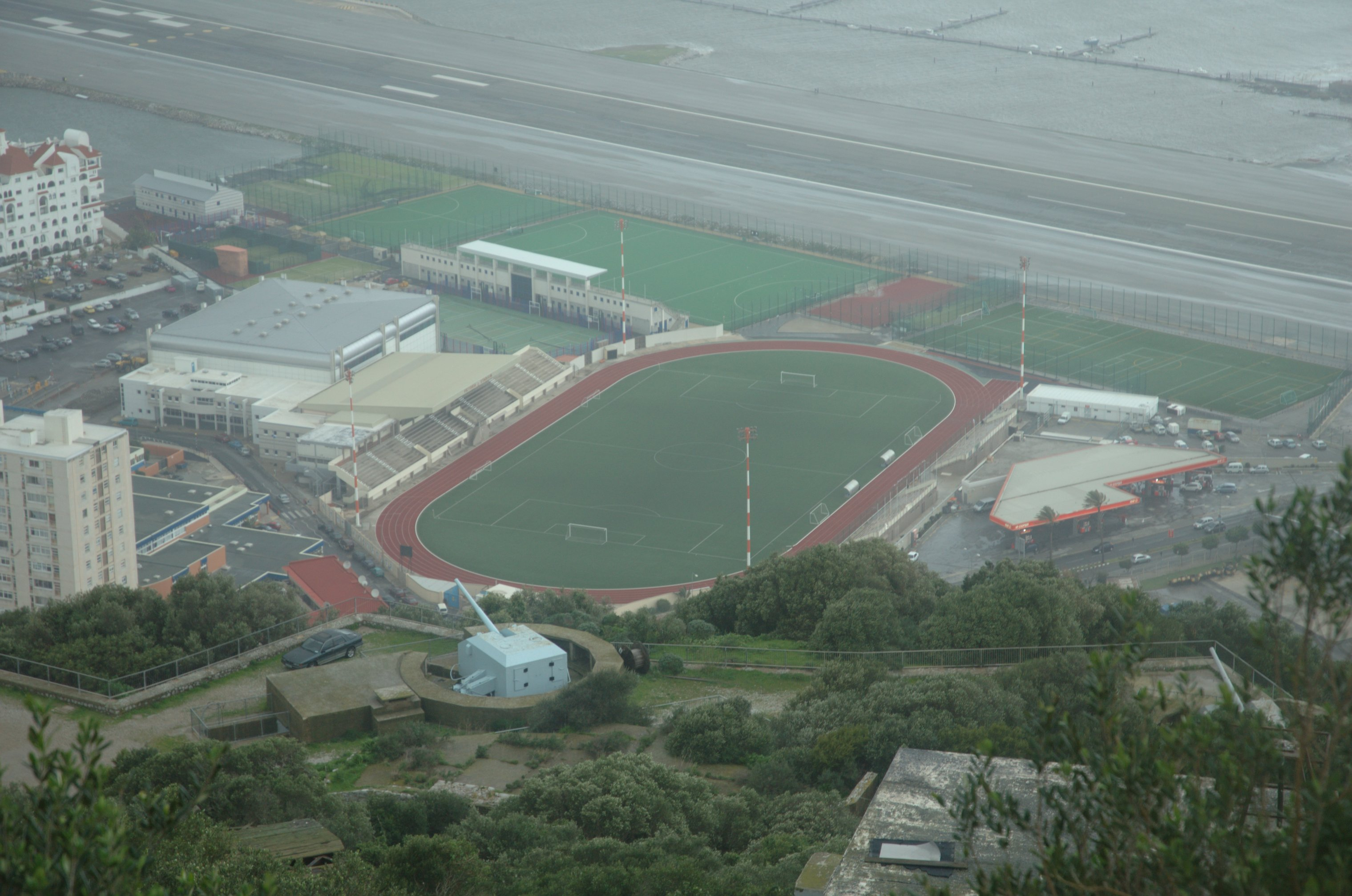
Victoria Stadium before renovation

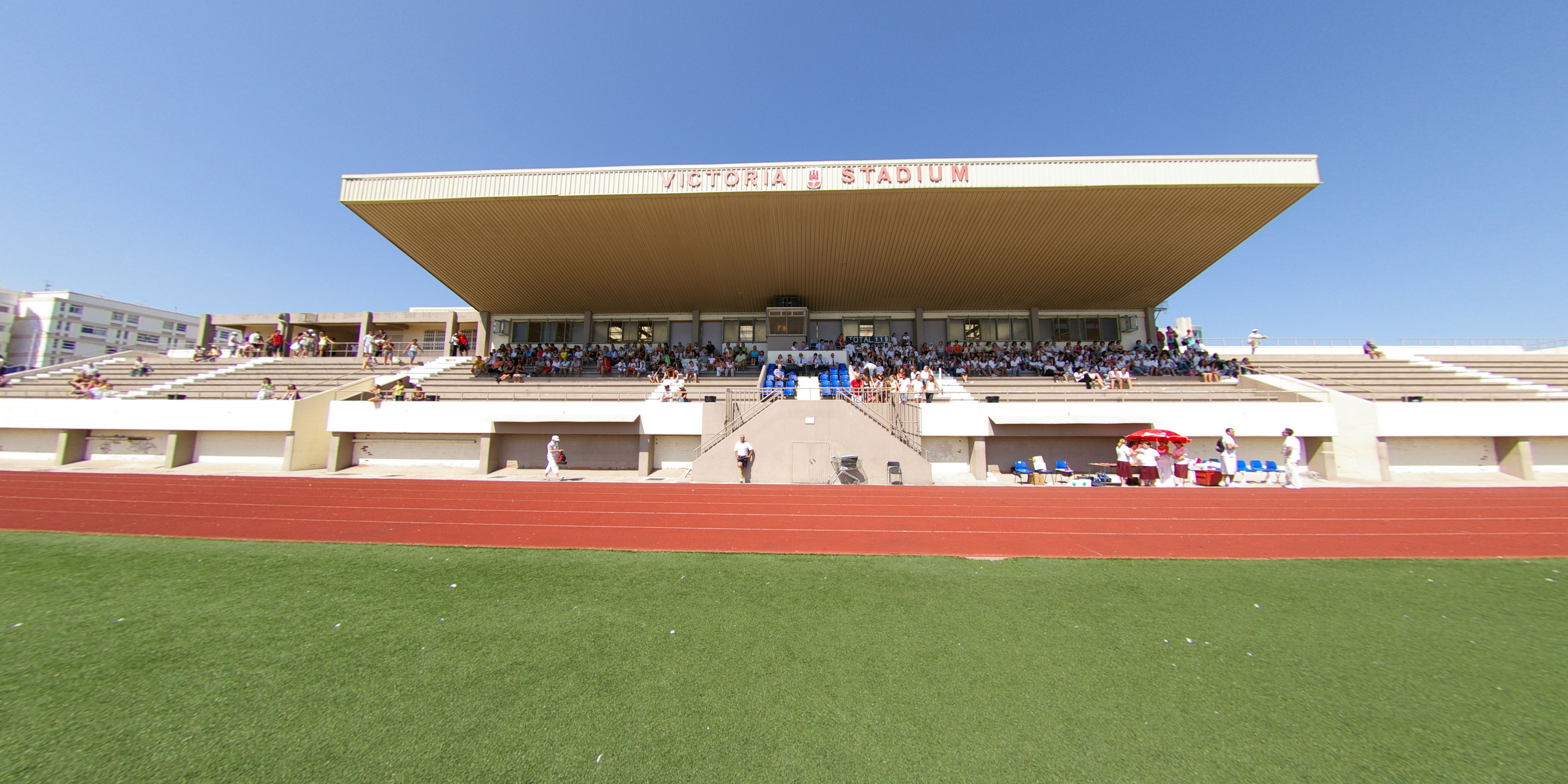
Main stand

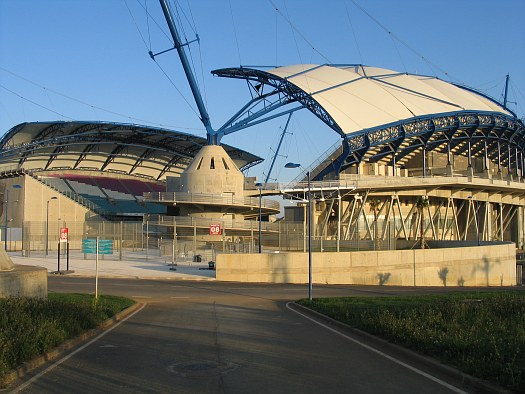
Estádio Algarve
(2013–2017, 2023–present) (temporary)

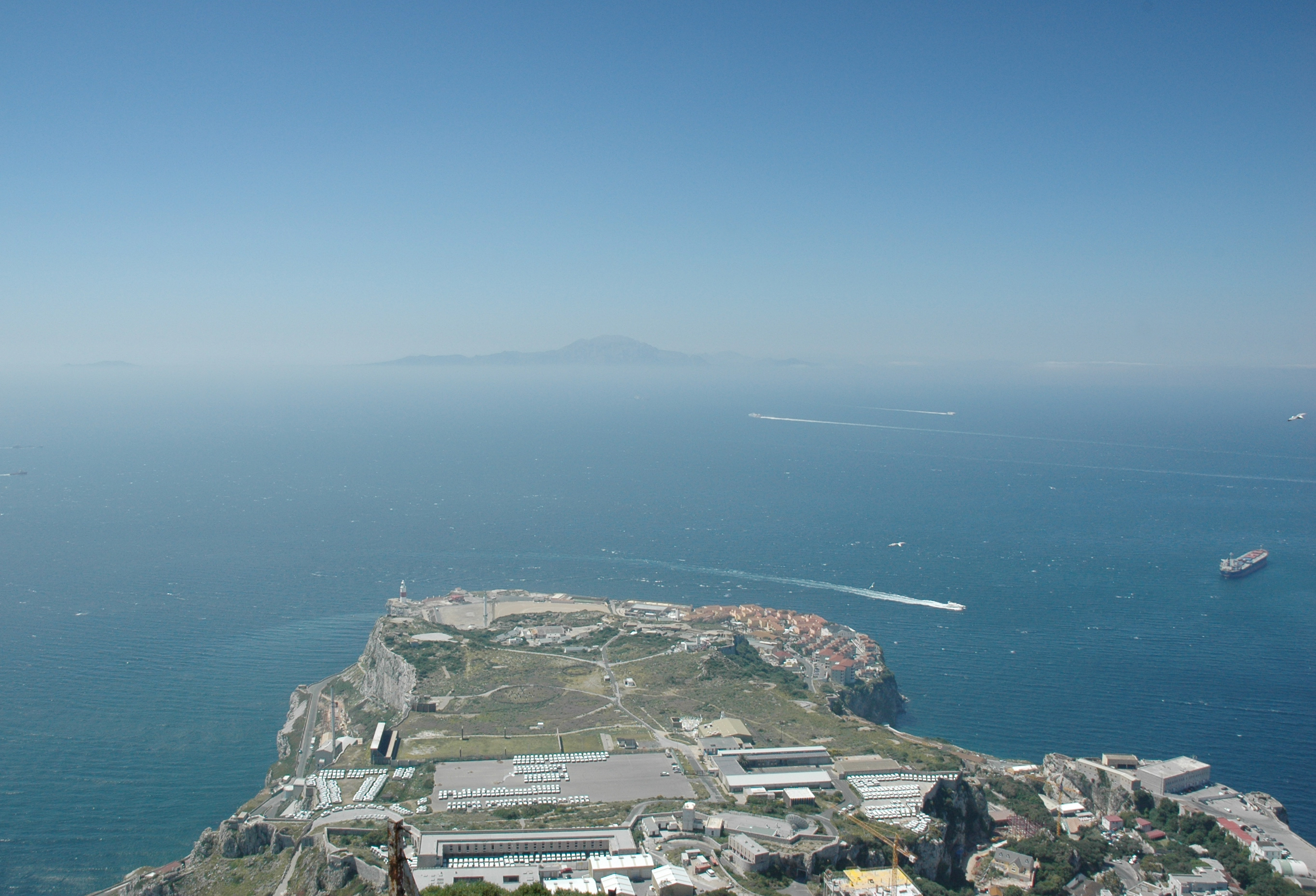
Europa Point, site of Europa Sports Park (2024–present)

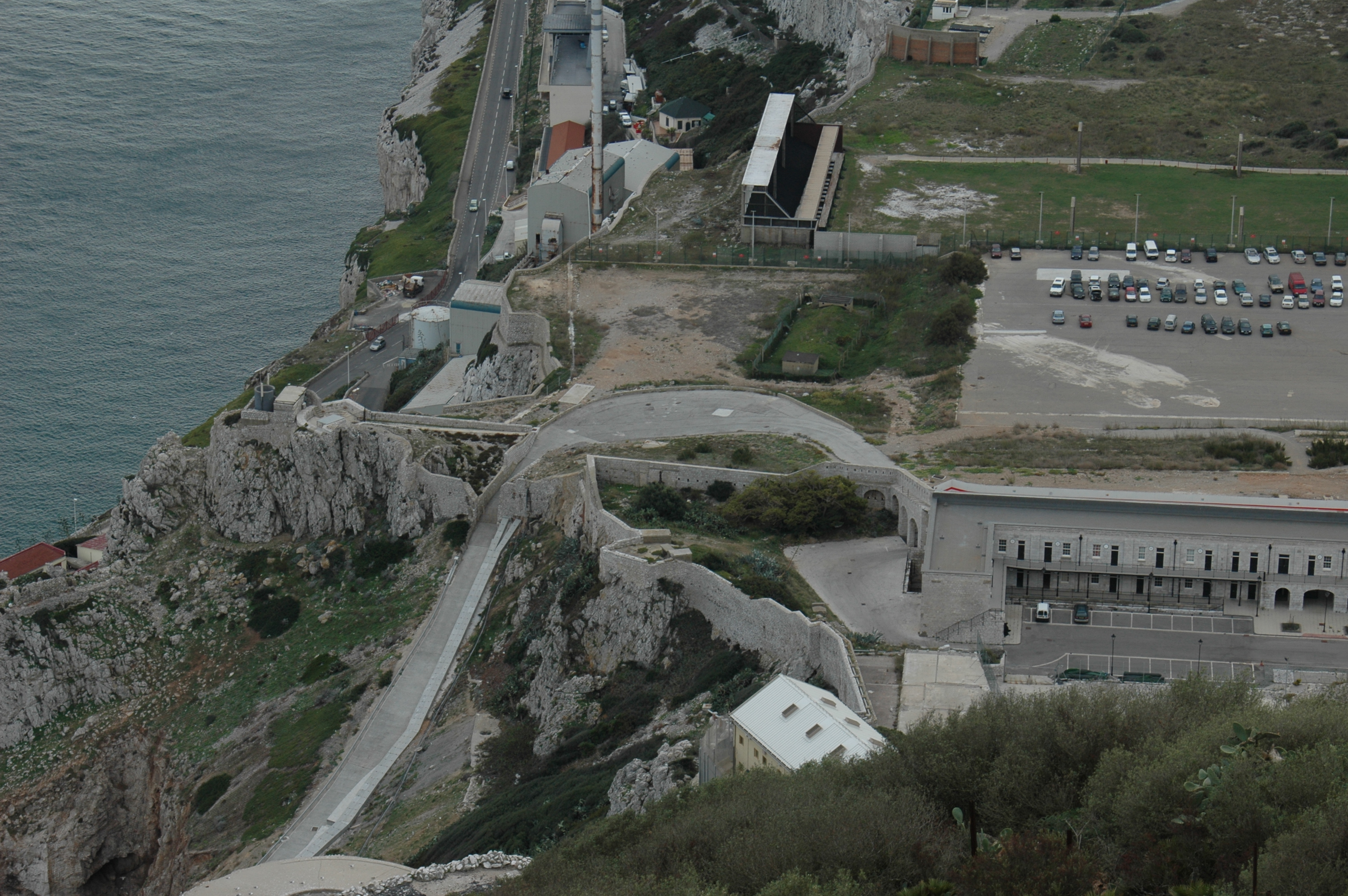
View of Lathbury Barracks

== Results and fixtures ==
The following is a list of match results in the last 12 months, as well as any future matches that have been scheduled.

Win Draw Loss Fixture

=== 2026 ===
26 March 2026 Nations League promotion/relegation play-offs	Gibraltar	0–1	Latvia	Europa Point, Gibraltar
18:00 UTC+1		Report	Gutkovskis 64' (pen.)	Stadium: Europa Point Stadium; Attendance: 1,442; Referee: Ivan Kružliak (Slovakia)

31 March 2026 Nations League promotion/relegation play-offs	Latvia	1–0 (2–0 agg.)	Gibraltar	Riga, Latvia
17:00 (19:00 UTC+3)	Černomordijs 90+3'	Report		Stadium: Skonto Stadium; Attendance: 5,120; Referee: Sandro Schärer (Switzerland)

3 June 2026 Friendly	Gibraltar	4–0	British Virgin Islands	Europa Point, Gibraltar
19:00	Lacey 10' (o.g.); J. Scanlon 32', 64'; Mason 42'	Report (UEFA); Report (FIFA)		Stadium: Europa Point Stadium; Attendance: 992; Referee: Antoine Chiaramonti (Andorra)

6 June 2026 Friendly	Gibraltar	4–1	Cayman Islands	Europa Point, Gibraltar
19:00	J. Scanlon 12'; Borge 49'; Valarino 57'; De Barr 59'	Report (UEFA); Report (FIFA)	Reeves 1'	Stadium: Europa Point Stadium; Attendance: 779; Referee: Antoine Chiaramonti (Andorra)

23 September 2026 Friendly	Gibraltar	0–0	São Tomé and Príncipe	Europa Point, Gibraltar
18:00		Report		Stadium: Europa Point Stadium; Attendance: 587; Referee: Tom Owen (Wales)

27 September 2026 2026–27 UEFA Nations League D	Gibraltar	0–0	Andorra	Europa Point, Gibraltar
18:00		Report		Stadium: Europa Point Stadium; Attendance: 1,382; Referee: Genc Nuza (Kosovo)

1 October 2026 2026–27 UEFA Nations League D	Malta	1–1	Gibraltar	Ta' Qali, Malta
20:45	Mbong 53'	Report	Scanlon 61'	Stadium: National Stadium; Attendance: 4,090; Referee: Antoni Bandić (Bosnia and Herzegovina)

5 October 2026 Friendly	Liechtenstein	0–2	Gibraltar	Vaduz, Liechtenstein
20:45		Report	Lopes 20'; Borge 57'	Stadium: Rheinpark Stadion; Attendance: 972; Referee: Luca Cibelli (Switzerland)

13 November 2026 2026–27 UEFA Nations League D	Andorra	2–0	Gibraltar	Encamp, Andorra
20:45	López 24'; Rosas 35'	Report		Stadium: Estadi de la FAF; Attendance: 710; Referee: Rob Hennessey (Ireland)

16 November 2026 2026–27 UEFA Nations League D	Gibraltar	1–1	Malta	Europa Point, Gibraltar
20:45	Richards 81'	Report	Shaw 19'	Stadium: Europa Point Stadium; Attendance: 1,095; Referee: Balázs Berke (Hungary)

== Personnel ==
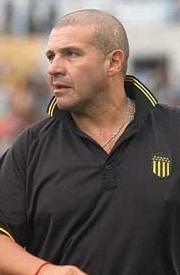
Julio César Ribas, Gibraltar's head coach from 2018 to 2025.

=== Current technical staff ===
As of 26 September 2026

Position	Name
Head coach Head of Elite Football	(Gibraltar) Scott Wiseman
Assistant coach	(Gibraltar) Garry Turner-Bone
Assistant coach	(Gibraltar) Anthony Bardon
Goalkeeper coach	(Gibraltar) Dayle Coleing
Physical Performance coach	(Gibraltar) Brendan Ramagge
Performance analyst	(Gibraltar) Liam Moreno (Gibraltar) Jake Moreno
Head of Football	(Gibraltar) Roy Chipolina
Medical Director	(Gibraltar) Dr Keith Gracia
Chief Medical Officer	(Gibraltar) Dr Kamil Baczynski
Head of Performance	(Gibraltar) Iain Latin
Team physiotherapist Data Science Analyst	(Gibraltar) Andrew Rodriguez
National team manager	(Gibraltar) Gary Robba
Football Development Officer	(Gibraltar) Liam Walker

=== Coaching history ===
Up to date as of 16 November 2026

Manager	Nation	Gibraltar career	Played	Won	Drawn	Lost	GF	GA	Win %
Allen Bula	(Gibraltar)	2013–2015	9	1	2	6	3	28	11.11
David Wilson (interim)	(Scotland)	2015	3	0	0	3	1	17	0.00
Jeff Wood	(England)	2015–2018	17	0	1	16	4	79	0.00
Desi Curry (interim)	(Northern Ireland)	2018	1	1	0	0	1	0	100.00
Julio César Ribas	(Uruguay)	2018–2025	64	8	11	45	27	175	12.50
Scott Wiseman	(Gibraltar)	2025–present	20	3	4	13	15	38	15.00

== Players ==
=== Current squad ===
The following players were called up for the 2026–27 UEFA Nations League matches against Andorra and Malta, between 13 and 16 November 2026.

Information correct as of 16 November 2026, after the match against Malta.

No.	Pos.	Player	Date of birth (age)	Caps	Goals	Club
1	GK	Bradley Banda	20 January 1998 (age 28)	23	0	(Gibraltar Football Association) St Joseph's
23	GK	Jaylan Hankins	17 November 2000 (age 26)	13	0	(Gibraltar Football Association) Lincoln Red Imps
13	GK	Harry Victor	29 January 2004 (age 22)	0	0	(Gibraltar Football Association) Glacis United
12	DF	Louie Annesley	3 May 2000 (age 26)	58	1	(The Football Association) Dorking Wanderers
8	DF	Kian Ronan	9 March 2001 (age 25)	55	0	(The Football Association) Chelmsford City
20	DF	Ethan Britto	30 November 2000 (age 25)	48	1	(Gibraltar Football Association) Lincoln Red Imps
6	DF	Bernardo Lopes	30 July 1993 (age 33)	45	1	(Gibraltar Football Association) Lincoln Red Imps
3	DF	Julian Valarino (vice-captain)	23 June 2000 (age 26)	40	1	(Gibraltar Football Association) St Joseph's
2	DF	Paddy McClafferty	19 September 2004 (age 22)	8	0	(Gibraltar Football Association) St Joseph's
18	DF	Jayvan Garro	1 June 2008 (age 18)	3	0	(Gibraltar Football Association) Mons Calpe
22	MF	Graeme Torrilla (captain)	3 September 1997 (age 29)	44	1	(Gibraltar Football Association) Lincoln Red Imps
4	MF	Nicholas Pozo	19 January 2005 (age 21)	31	0	(The Football Association) Boston United
11	MF	James Scanlon	28 September 2006 (age 20)	30	6	(The Football Association) Arsenal
5	MF	Dan Bent	10 January 1996 (age 30)	23	2	(Irish Football Association) Larne
17	MF	Liam Jessop	13 August 2005 (age 21)	11	1	(Irish Football Association) Portadown
15	MF	Jesse Gomez	11 October 2005 (age 21)	7	0	(The Football Association) Consett
16	MF	Han Stevens	16 April 2005 (age 21)	7	0	(Gibraltar Football Association) FC Magpies
21	MF	Jeremy Perera	14 January 2006 (age 20)	5	0	(The Football Association) Silsden
14	MF	Luke Schofield	24 July 2008 (age 18)	0	0	(The Football Association) Huddersfield Town
7	FW	Carlos Richards	22 June 2005 (age 21)	17	1	(The Football Association) Three Bridges
9	FW	Dylan Borge	15 October 2003 (age 23)	14	2	(Gibraltar Football Association) Mons Calpe
19	FW	Leon Mason	16 May 2007 (age 19)	7	1	(Gibraltar Football Association) Lincoln Red Imps
10	FW	Julian Del Rio	15 February 2002 (age 24)	6	0	(Gibraltar Football Association) FC Magpies

=== Recent call-ups ===
The following players have been called up to the national team in the past 12 months but are not part of the current squad.

Pos.	Player	Date of birth (age)	Caps	Goals	Club	Latest call-up
GK	Victor Huart	5 September 2008 (age 18)	0	0	(England) Chesterfield	v. Liechtenstein, 5 October 2026
GK	Thomas Chakraverty	25 April 2003 (age 23)	0	0	(Gibraltar) Mons Calpe	v. Latvia, 31 March 2026
DF	Ethan Jolley	29 March 1997 (age 29)	49	0	(Gibraltar) Lincoln Red Imps	v. Andorra, 13 November 2026^{INJ}
DF	Alain Pons	16 August 1995 (age 31)	28	0	(Gibraltar) St Joseph's	v. Liechtenstein, 5 October 2026
DF	Ethan Llambias	23 November 2000 (age 25)	0	0	(Gibraltar) Mons Calpe	v. Liechtenstein, 5 October 2026
DF	Kai Mauro	30 May 2007 (age 19)	10	0	(England) Boston United	v. São Tomé and Príncipe, 23 September 2026
DF	Jay Coombes	9 March 2007 (age 19)	0	0	(Gibraltar) Lincoln Red Imps	v. Cayman Islands, 6 June 2026
DF	Kevagn Ronco	20 April 1998 (age 28)	0	0	(Gibraltar) FC Magpies	v. British Virgin Islands, 3 June 2026
DF	Bilal Douah	25 July 2003 (age 23)	1	0	(Gibraltar) Lynx	v. Latvia, 31 March 2026
DF	Joachim Ostheider	10 April 2007 (age 19)	0	0	(Spain) Estepona	v. Latvia, 31 March 2026
MF	Evan De Haro	28 September 2002 (age 24)	13	0	(Gibraltar) St Joseph's	v. São Tomé and Príncipe, 23 September 2026
MF	Rafi Emrani	27 March 2005 (age 21)	1	0	(Gibraltar) Lynx	v. Latvia, 31 March 2026
FW	Tjay De Barr	13 March 2000 (age 26)	64	4	(Serbia) OFK Beograd	v. Andorra, 13 November 2026^{SUS}
FW	Jaiden Bartolo	10 February 2006 (age 20)	17	0	(England) Salisbury	v. Liechtenstein, 5 October 2026
FW	Jamie Coombes	27 May 1996 (age 30)	33	0	(Gibraltar) St Joseph's	v. Cayman Islands, 6 June 2026
FW	Ayoub El Hmidi	30 September 2000 (age 26)	15	0	(United Arab Emirates) Al Dhaid	v. Cayman Islands, 6 June 2026
FW	Luca Scanlon	13 July 2009 (age 17)	4	0	(England) Burnley	v. Cayman Islands, 6 June 2026
FW	Lee Casciaro ^{RET}	29 September 1981 (age 45)	67	3	(Gibraltar) Lincoln Red Imps	v. British Virgin Islands, 3 June 2026
^{INJ} Withdrew from the squad due to an injury^{PRE} Preliminary squad^{RET} Retired from the national team^{WD} Withdrew for other reasons

== Player records ==
As of 16 November 2026
Players in bold are still active with Gibraltar.

=== Most appearances ===
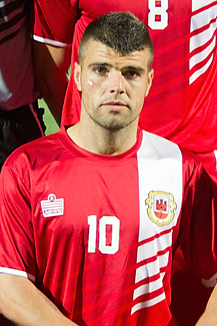
Liam Walker is Gibraltar's most capped player and all-time top goalscorer.

Rank	Player	Caps	Goals	Career
1	Liam Walker	88	8	2013–2025
2	Roy Chipolina	75	5	2013–2024
3	Lee Casciaro	67	3	2014–2026
4	**Jayce Olivero**	66	0	2016–present
5	**Tjay De Barr**	64	4	2018–present
6	Joseph Chipolina	61	2	2013–2024
6	Jack Sergeant	61	0	2013–2024
8	**Louie Annesley**	58	1	2018–present
9	**Kian Ronan**	55	0	2020–present
10	**Ethan Jolley**	49	0	2019–present

=== Top goalscorers ===
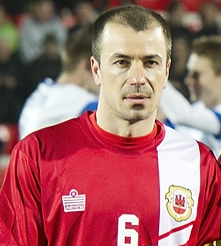
Roy Chipolina, was Gibraltar's first captain since their admittance to UEFA in 2013.

Rank	Player	Goals	Caps	Ratio	Career
1	Liam Walker	8	88	0.09	2013–2025
2	**James Scanlon**	6	30	0.2	2024–present
3	Roy Chipolina	5	75	0.07	2013–2024
4	**Tjay De Barr**	4	64	0.06	2018–present
5	Reece Styche	3	31	0.1	2014–2023
5	Lee Casciaro	3	67	0.04	2014–2026
7	Jake Gosling	2	12	0.17	2014–2018
7	**Dylan Borge**	2	14	0.14	2021–present
7	**Dan Bent**	2	23	0.09	2024–present
7	Joseph Chipolina	2	61	0.03	2013–2024

== Competitive record ==
=== FIFA World Cup ===
FIFA World Cup record									Qualification record					
Year	Round	Position	Pld	W	D*	L	GF	GA	Pld	W	D	L	GF	GA
1930 to 2014	Not a FIFA member								Not a FIFA member					
(Russia) 2018	Did not qualify								10	0	0	10	3	47
(Qatar) 2022	Did not qualify								10	0	0	10	4	43
(Canada) (Mexico) (United States) 2026	Did not qualify								8	0	0	8	3	28
(Morocco) (Portugal) (Spain) 2030	To be determined								To be determined					
(Saudi Arabia) 2034	To be determined								To be determined					
Total	—	0/2	0	0	0	0	0	0	28	0	0	28	10	118

=== UEFA European Championship ===
UEFA European Championship record									Qualifying record					
Year	Round	Position	Pld	W	D*	L	GF	GA	Pld	W	D	L	GF	GA
1960 to 2012	Not a UEFA member								Not a UEFA member					
(France) 2016	Did not qualify								10	0	0	10	2	56
(Europe) 2020	Did not qualify								8	0	0	8	3	31
(Germany) 2024	Did not qualify								8	0	0	8	0	41
(England) (Scotland) (Republic of Ireland) (Wales) 2028	To be determined								To be determined					
(Italy) (Turkey) 2032	To be determined								To be determined					
Total	—	0/3	0	0	0	0	0	0	26	0	0	26	5	128

=== UEFA Nations League ===
UEFA Nations League record
League phase												Promotion/Relegation play-offs					
Season	LG	Grp	Pos.	Pld	W	D	L	GF	GA	P/R	RK	Pld	W	D*	L	GF	GA
2018–19	D	4	3rd	6	2	0	4	5	15	Same position	49th	—N/a					
2020–21	D	2	1st	4	2	2	0	3	1	▲	49th	—N/a					
2022–23	C	4	4th	6	0	1	5	3	18	▼	48th	2	0	0	2	0	2
2024–25	D	1	2nd	4	1	3	0	4	3	Same position	52nd	2	0	0	2	0	2
2026–27	D	1	2nd	3	0	2	1	1	3	▲	TBD	—N/a					
Total				23	5	8	10	16	40	—	48th	4	0	0	4	0	4

=== Island Games ===
Island Games record
Year	Round	Position	Pld	W	D	L	GF	GA
1989 to 1991	Did not enter							
(Isle of Wight) 1993	7th place match	8th	4	0	0	4	1	9
(Gibraltar) 1995	Runners-up	2nd	5	4	0	1	5	3
(Jersey) 1997	5th place match	6th	5	2	0	3	13	8
(Gotland) 1999	11th place match	11th	4	1	0	3	9	11
(Isle of Man) 2001	5th place match	5th	4	3	0	1	7	2
(Guernsey) 2003	5th place match	6th	5	3	0	2	29	5
(Shetland) 2005	Did not enter							
(Rhodes) 2007	Champions	1st	4	3	1	0	9	2
(Åland) 2009	9th place match	9th	4	2	1	1	12	3
(Isle of Wight) 2011	5th place match	5th	3	2	0	1	14	7
(Bermuda) 2013	Did not enter							
(Jersey) 2015 (Note: Development team from 2015 edition onward)	9th place match	10th	4	1	1	2	3	6
(Gotland) 2017	Did not enter							
(Gibraltar) 2019	Replaced by 2019 Inter Games Football Tournament							
(Guernsey) 2023	Did not enter							
(Orkney) 2025	Did not enter							
(Faroe Islands) 2027	To be confirmed							
(Isle of Man) 2029	To be confirmed							
Total	1 Title	10/19	42	21	3	18	102	56

*Gold background colour indicates that the tournament was won. Red border colour indicates tournament was held on home soil.

=== Four Nations Tournament ===
Year	Round	Position	Pld	W	D	L	GF	GA
(Wales) 2008	Group	4th	3	0	0	3	4	11
Total	0 Titles	1/1	3	0	0	3	4	11

=== FIFI Wild Cup ===
Year	Round	Position	Pld	W	D	L	GF	GA
(Germany) 2006	Third place match	3rd	4	2	1	1	8	4
Total	0 Titles	1/1	4	2	1	1	8	4

== Head-to-head record ==
=== FIFA recognised record ===
The following table shows Gibraltar's all-time international record, correct as of 5 October 2026. Only official matches are included.

Opponents	Pld	W	D	L	GF	GA	GD	W%	First	Last
Albania	1	0	0	1	0	1	−1	0.00	2025	2025
Andorra	4	2	2	0	2	0	+2	50.00	2021	2026
Armenia	2	1	0	1	3	6	−3	50.00	2018	2018
Belgium	2	0	0	2	0	15	−15	0.00	2016	2017
Bosnia and Herzegovina	2	0	0	2	0	9	−9	0.00	2017	2017
British Virgin Islands	1	1	0	0	4	0	+4	100.00	2026	2026
Bulgaria	3	0	1	2	2	9	−7	0.00	2020	2022
Cayman Islands	1	1	0	0	4	1	+3	100.00	2026	2026
Croatia	3	0	0	3	0	14	−14	0.00	2015	2025
Cyprus	2	0	0	2	2	5	−3	0.00	2016	2017
Czech Republic	2	0	0	2	0	10	−10	0.00	2025	2025
Denmark	2	0	0	2	0	12	−12	0.00	2019	2019
Estonia	5	0	1	4	1	14	−13	0.00	2014	2019
Faroe Islands	4	0	1	3	2	7	−5	0.00	2014	2025
France	2	0	0	2	0	17	−17	0.00	2023	2023
Georgia	6	0	0	6	3	19	−16	0.00	2014	2022
Germany	2	0	0	2	0	11	−11	0.00	2014	2015
Greece	4	0	0	4	1	16	−15	0.00	2016	2023
Grenada	1	0	1	0	0	0	+0	0.00	2022	2022
Kosovo	1	0	0	1	0	1	−1	0.00	2019	2019
Latvia	6	1	0	5	3	13	−10	16.67	2016	2026
Liechtenstein	9	4	4	1	10	6	+4	44.44	2016	2026
Lithuania	2	0	0	2	0	2	−2	0.00	2024	2024
Malta	4	1	1	2	2	4	−2	25.00	2014	2026
Moldova	1	0	1	0	1	1	+0	0.00	2024	2024
Montenegro	4	0	0	4	3	12	−9	0.00	2021	2025
Netherlands	4	0	0	4	0	22	−22	0.00	2021	2023
New Caledonia	1	0	0	1	0	2	−2	0.00	2025	2025
North Macedonia	4	0	0	4	0	12	−12	0.00	2018	2022
Norway	2	0	0	2	1	8	−7	0.00	2021	2021
Poland	2	0	0	2	1	15	−14	0.00	2014	2015
Portugal	1	0	0	1	0	5	−5	0.00	2016	2016
Republic of Ireland	6	0	0	6	0	21	−21	0.00	2014	2023
San Marino	4	2	2	0	3	1	+2	50.00	2020	2024
São Tomé and Príncipe	1	0	1	0	0	0	+0	0.00	2026	2026
Scotland	3	0	0	3	1	14	−13	0.00	2015	2024
Slovakia	1	0	1	0	0	0	+0	0.00	2013	2013
Slovenia	1	0	0	1	0	6	−6	0.00	2021	2021
Switzerland	2	0	0	2	1	10	−9	0.00	2019	2019
Turkey	2	0	0	2	0	9	−9	0.00	2021	2021
Wales	2	0	1	1	0	4	−4	0.00	2023	2024
Total	112	13	17	82	50	334	−284	11.61	2013	2026

=== Non-FIFA record ===
Opponent	Pld	W	D	L	GF	GA
Åland	1	0	0	1	1	2
England C	2	1	0	1	3	2
Faroe Islands	1	1	0	0	3	0
Frøya	3	3	0	0	17	1
Greenland	4	2	0	2	7	7
Guernsey	1	0	1	0	0	0
Isle of Man	2	2	0	0	3	1
Isle of Wight	4	2	0	2	6	3
Jersey	7	1	1	5	8	15
Madeira	1	0	0	1	0	2
Menorca	1	1	0	0	2	1
Monaco	2	1	1	0	6	2
Northern Cyprus	1	0	0	1	0	2
Orkney	2	2	0	0	9	1
(Hamburg) Republic of St. Pauli	2	1	1	0	3	2
Rhodes	2	2	0	0	6	0
Sark	1	1	0	0	19	0
Scotland Semi-Pro	1	0	0	1	2	4
Shetland	4	1	0	3	5	6
Tibet	1	1	0	0	5	0
Wales Semi-Pro	1	0	0	1	2	6
Ynys Môn	4	1	0	3	3	6

== Honours ==
=== Non-FIFA competitions ===
- Island Games
  - Gold medal (1): 2007
  - Silver medal (1): 1995
- FIFI Wild Cup
  - Third place (1): 2006

== See also ==
- Football in Gibraltar
- List of football clubs in Gibraltar
