= Michael Bakare =

English footballer

Personal information
- Full name: Michael Adewale A. Oluwabunmi Bakare
- Date of birth: 1 December 1986 (age 39)
- Place of birth: Hackney, England
- Height: 1.81 m (5 ft 11 1/2 in)
- Positions: Forward; defender

Team information
- Current team: Glacis United (player-coach)
- Number: 14

Senior career*
| Years | Team | Apps | (Gls) |
| 2006–2007 | Hertford Town | | |
| 2007 | Waltham Forest | | |
| 2007–2008 | Welwyn Garden City | | |
| 2008–2009 | Leyton | | |
| 2009–2010 | Welling United | 19 | (1) |
| 2010 | Thurrock | 5 | (0) |
| 2010–2011 | Bishop's Stortford | 35 | (13) |
| 2011–2012 | Chelmsford City | 10 | (5) |
| 2012 | Macclesfield Town | 9 | (0) |
| 2012 | Southport | 11 | (0) |
| 2012 | → Droylsden (loan) | 1 | (1) |
| 2012–2013 | Chelmsford City | 14 | (5) |
| 2013–2014 | Dover Athletic | 12 | (1) |
| 2014 | Tonbridge Angels | 17 | (5) |
| 2014 | Braintree Town | 11 | (1) |
| 2015 | → Bury Town (loan) | 2 | (1) |
| 2015 | VCD Athletic | | |
| 2015 | Witham Town | | |
| 2015–2016 | Welling United | 21 | (3) |
| 2016–2017 | Wrexham | 8 | (0) |
| 2016 | → Billericay Town (loan) | | (4) |
| 2017 | Warrington Town | 4 | (2) |
| 2017–2020 | Connah's Quay Nomads | 81 | (30) |
| 2021 | Hereford | 1 | (1) |
| 2021 | Fjölnir | 11 | (4) |
| 2021–2022 | Leatherhead | 7 | (4) |
| 2022 | Arbroath | 2 | (0) |
| 2022 | HIFK | 11 | (2) |
| 2023 | Enfield Town | 4 | (1) |
| 2023– | Glacis United | 53 | (7) |

Managerial career
- 2024–2025: Glacis United (player-manager)
- * Club domestic league appearances and goals as of 11:42, 6 September 2026 (UTC)

Michael Adewale A. Oluwabunmi Bakare (born 1 December 1986) is an English professional footballer who plays for Glacis United. Formerly a forward, Bakare converted to a defender later in his career.

== Career ==
=== Early career ===
Bakare started his senior career in the 2006–07 season, playing for Hertford Town and Waltham Forest. The following season, Bakare signed for Welwyn Garden City. In 2008, Bakare signed for Leyton, before spells with Welling United, and Thurrock. In 2010, Bakare joined Bishop's Stortford. It was here where he first made a real impact, converting from a full back and midfielder to a forward player.

Following an impressive 9 goals in 14 games early in the 2011/12 season, Bakare joined Conference South club Chelmsford City, in a free transfer on 19 October 2011. He continued to impress at his new club, scoring 5 goals in 10 games, which earned Bakare a move to Football League side, Macclesfield Town on 17 January 2012.

=== Macclesfield Town ===
Bakare signed on a free transfer, and made his first appearance as a substitute against Swindon Town on 21 January 2012. He was however limited to substitute appearances at Macclesfield, not starting a single game, and was released by the club, following their relegation at the end of the 2011/2012 season, making only 9 appearances. His last game was against Southend United on 5 May 2012.

=== Southport ===
Conference National club Southport took Bakare on trial in July 2012. After a single appearance in a friendly against Skelmersdale United it was announced manager Liam Watson had signed the player to a contract for the 2012–13 season at the club's AGM on 27 July 2012.

==== Droylsden (loan) ====
In October 2012 he joined Droylsden on loan and scored on his club debut on 27 October as the club beat Colwyn Bay.

==== 2013–2016 ====
From then on he has been somewhat of a journeyman, going on to play for Chelmsford City, Dover Athletic, Tonbridge Angels, Braintree Town, Bury Town, VCD Athletic and Witham Town before rejoining his former club Welling United for the 2015/16 season.

=== Wrexham ===
On 22 June 2016, he joined Wrexham, along with his Welling teammate Nortei Nortey, on a 1-year deal. He made his debut for the club on the opening day of the 2016–17 season, in a 0–0 draw with Dover Athletic.

On 24 November 2016, he joined Billericay Town on loan from Wrexham until January 2017. He made his debut in a league match against Metropolitan Police where he won his side a penalty before converting it himself, in a game that finished 1–1. Following the end of his loan spell, Bakare returned to Wrexham where his contract was cancelled by mutual consent on 23 January 2017.

=== Warrington Town ===
Bakare signed for Warrington Town on 23 March 2017.

=== Connah's Quay Nomads ===
In August 2017, Bakare joined Welsh Premier League side Connah's Quay Nomads, alongside his brother Mathias, after a successful trial period. In May 2018, he scored in the Welsh Cup final, helping his team to a 4–1 win. In December 2018, Bakare extended his contract with Connah's Quay for a further year.

=== Hereford ===
On 16 February 2021, Bakare joined National League North side Hereford on a short-term deal.

=== Iceland ===
On 13 July 2021, Bakare signed for Icelandic 1. deild karla side Fjölnir, joining a team outside of the UK for the first time.

=== Leatherhead ===
In November 2021, he returned to England and signed for Isthmian League Premier Division side Leatherhead.

=== Arbroath ===
In February 2022, Bakare signed a short-term deal with Scottish Championship side Arbroath until the end of the season.

=== HIFK ===
In July 2022, Bakare joined Veikkausliiga side HIFK until the end of the year.

=== Enfield Town ===
In March 2023, Bakare returned to England and signed for Isthmian League Premier Division club Enfield Town on a contract till the end of the season.

=== Glacis United ===
In August 2023 Bakare joined Glacis United in the Gibraltar Football League. He was appointed player-manager the following season.
