= St Joseph's F.C. =

Association football club in Gibraltar

St. Joseph's
- Full name: St Joseph's Football Club Gibraltar
- Nickname: The Saints
- Founded: 20 January 1912; 114 years ago
- Ground: Victoria Stadium, Winston Churchill Avenue, Gibraltar
- Capacity: 2,300
- Owner: Mike Garlick
- Manager: Javi Muñoz
- League: Gibraltar Football League
- 2025–26: GFL, 2nd
- Website: https://www.stjosephsfcgib.co.uk
Home colours	Away colours

St. Joseph's Football Club is a professional football club based in Gibraltar. Founded in 1912, it currently plays in the Gibraltar Football League. The club also has two futsal teams and more than 10 youth teams.

== History ==
Formed in 1912, St Joseph's are Gibraltar's oldest still existing football club, with the next oldest, Manchester 62, formed 50 years later. They have consistently competed in the Gibraltar Premier Division in that time. However, they have only won the title once: in the 1995–96 season. They have seen considerably better fortunes in the Rock Cup, however, with 10 titles in their history, including a league and cup double in 1996. Their last Rock Cup triumph came in 2013. In 2013, they established links as a feeder club to Real Balompédica Linense.

Since Gibraltar became a member of UEFA, the Saints initially endured more mixed fortunes, including narrowly avoiding relegation in the 2013–14 season, ending up in the relegation play-off and narrowly beating Mons Calpe to retain their Premier Division status. Since that near miss, they have consistently finished in the top half of the league, and in 2017 qualified for the UEFA Europa League for the first time with a 3rd-place finish, after Gibraltar had been given an additional spot in the competition. However, their maiden campaign would be short-lived as they suffered a resounding 10-0 aggregate defeat to AEL Limassol of Cyprus. In August, the club were hit when two players, club captain Esteban Montes and Alberto Montaño, were imposed with five and three year bans from football in Gibraltar, respectively, for breaching rules on betting. Both players were immediately released from the club.

The club quickly established themselves at one of the "Big Three" of Gibraltarian football in the UEFA era before running into financial difficulties in early 2022. As a result of this, in June that year, former Burnley owner and chairman Mike Garlick purchased the club, with Weymouth owner Mark Palmer also joining the board.

=== Seasons (since UEFA acceptance) ===
Season	Division	League record								Rock Cup	Pepe Reyes Cup	European competitions		Top league scorer(s)	
Season	Division	P	W	D	L	F	A	Pts	Pos	Rock Cup	Pepe Reyes Cup	Competition	Result	Player	Goals
2013–14	Premier Division	14	4	1	9	20	29	13	7th	Second round	Winners	—	—	Nathan Santos	6
2014–15	Premier Division	21	12	2	7	36	18	38	4th	Semi-final	Runners-up	—	—	José Luis Romero	11
2015–16	Premier Division	27	14	3	10	50	37	45	3rd	Second round	—	—	—	José Verdejo	9
2016–17	Premier Division	27	16	6	5	53	18	54	3rd	Semi-final	—	—	—	John-Paul Duarte	15
2017–18	Premier Division	27	17	3	7	53	30	54	3rd	Quarter-final	—	UEFA Europa League	First qualifying round	Boro	9
2018–19	Premier Division	27	17	4	6	69	29	55	3rd	Quarter-final	—	UEFA Europa League	Preliminary round	Boro	21
2019–20	National League	17	14	2	1	58	15	44	2nd (Note: The 2019–20 Gibraltar National League season, and the 2020 Rock Cup, were abandoned due to the COVID-19 pandemic, with results declared null and void.)	~~Semi-final~~ (Note: St Joseph's had won their quarter final match before the 2020 Rock Cup was abandoned.)	—	UEFA Europa League	First qualifying round	Juanfri	24
2020–21	National League	20	14	3	3	71	20	45	3rd	Quarter-final	—	UEFA Europa League	Preliminary round	Juanfri	22
2021–22	National League	20	11	2	7	45	27	35	3rd	Quarter-final	—	UEFA Europa Conference League	First qualifying round	Juanfri	14
2022–23	Football League	20	10	2	8	36	25	32	5th	Semi-final	—	UEFA Europa Conference League	Second qualifying round	Boro	8
2023–24	Football League	25	20	3	2	62	16	63	2nd	Semi-final	—	—	—	Pablo Rodríguez	15
2024–25	Football League	25	21	3	1	65	15	66	2nd	Quarter-final	Winners	UEFA Conference League	First qualifying round	Pablo Rodríguez	10

== Honours ==
- Gibraltar Football League: 1

1995–96

- Rock Cup: 9

1978–79, 1982–83, 1983–84, 1984–85, 1986–87, 1991–92, 1995–96, 2011–12, 2013

- Gibraltar Premier Cup: 1

1955–56

- Pepe Reyes Cup: 2

2013, 2024

- Gibraltar Women's Football League: 1

2007

== Current squad ==
=== First team ===
As of 1 September 2026

Note: Flags indicate national team as defined under FIFA eligibility rules; some limited exceptions apply. Players may hold more than one non-FIFA nationality.

No.	Pos.	Nation	Player
1	GK	GIB	Bradley Banda
2	DF	GHA	Kingsley Fobi
3	MF	GIB	Julian Valarino
4	DF	ESP	Javi Paul
5	DF	ESP	Geovanni Barba
6	MF	GIB	Evan De Haro
7	FW	ESP	Javi Forján
8	MF	ESP	Javi Moreno
9	FW	ESP	Francis Ferrón
10	MF	ESP	Marco Rosa
11	FW	ESP	Taufek Bayoud
12	MF	GIB	Mitchell Gibson
13	GK	ESP	Iván Villanueva

No.	Pos.	Nation	Player
14	DF	GIB	Erin Barnett
15	DF	GIB	Ethan Santos
16	MF	SEN	Bakaray Diedhiou
17	FW	GIB	Jamie Coombes
18	FW	ESP	Miguel Pérez
19	FW	ESP	Álvaro Cascajo
20	DF	ESP	Álex Cortijo
21	DF	GIB	Alain Pons
22	MF	ESP	Juanma González (captain)
24	DF	ESP	Julio Algar
25	DF	GIB	Paddy McClafferty
30	GK	ESP	Gato Romero
33	MF	ESP	Carlos Pérez

==== On loan ====
Note: Flags indicate national team as defined under FIFA eligibility rules; some limited exceptions apply. Players may hold more than one non-FIFA nationality.

No.	Pos.	Nation	Player
16	MF	GIB	Frankie Perry (at Lions Gibraltar)

== Club staff ==
Position	Name
Club Management
Manager	(Spain) Javi Muñoz
Assistant coach	(Spain) Juan Mari Sánchez
Fitness coach	(Spain) Dani Fernández (Spain) David Herrera (Spain) Adrián Diaz
Goalkeeping coach	(Spain) Félix Romero (Spain) Gato Romero
Physio	(Spain) Jaime Rojas
Head Analyst; Coach	(Spain) Fernando Rosado
Kit manager	(Gibraltar) Christian Hook
Team delegate	(Spain) Ángel Chozas
Board
Chairman	(England) Mike Garlick
President	(Gibraltar) Stuart Rodriguez
Technical Director	(Gibraltar) John Paul Hendrick
Secretary	(Gibraltar) David O'Flaherty
Head of Youth	(Republic of Ireland) Kane Forster (Gibraltar) Chisum Sanchez
Youth co-ordinator	(Gibraltar) Christopher Gonzalez

== European record ==
Accurate as of match played 16 July 2026

Competition	Played	Won	Drew	Lost	GF	GA	GD	Win%
UEFA Cup / UEFA Europa League	9	1	3	5	6	25	−19	11.11
UEFA Conference League	14	1	7	6	9	24	−15	7.14
Total	23	2	10	11	15	53	−38	8.70

Legend: GF = Goals For. GA = Goals Against. GD = Goal Difference.

Season	Competition	Round	Club	Home	Away	Aggregate
2017–18	UEFA Europa League	1Q	(Cyprus) AEL Limassol	0–4	0–6	0–10
2018–19	UEFA Europa League	PR	(Faroe Islands) B36 Tórshavn	1–1	1–1	2–2, 2–4 (p)
2019–20	UEFA Europa League	PR	(Kosovo) Prishtina	2–0	1–1	3–1
2019–20	UEFA Europa League	1Q	(Scotland) Rangers	0–4	0–6	0–10
2020–21	UEFA Europa League	PR	(Faroe Islands) B36 Tórshavn	1–2	—N/a	—N/a
2021–22	UEFA Europa Conference League	1Q	(Estonia) FCI Levadia	1–1	1–3	2–4
2022–23	UEFA Europa Conference League	1Q	(Northern Ireland) Larne	0–0	1–0	1–0
2022–23	UEFA Europa Conference League	2Q	(Czech Republic) Slavia Prague	0–4	0–7	0–11
2024–25	UEFA Conference League	1Q	(Republic of Ireland) Shelbourne	1–1	1–2	2–3
2025–26	UEFA Conference League	1Q	(Northern Ireland) Cliftonville	2–2	3–2 (a.e.t.)	5–4
2025–26	UEFA Conference League	2Q	(Republic of Ireland) Shamrock Rovers	0–4	0–0	0–4
2026–27	UEFA Conference League	1Q	(Republic of Ireland) Bohemians	0–2	0–0	0–2

Notes

- PR: Preliminary round
- 1Q: First qualifying round
