= F.C. Magpies =

Association football club in Gibraltar

Magpies
- Full name: Football Club Magpies
- Nickname: The Magpies
- Founded: 2013; 13 years ago
- Ground: Victoria Stadium, Gibraltar
- Capacity: 2,300
- Chairman: Haig Oundjian
- Manager: Youri Loen
- League: Gibraltar Football League
- 2025–26: 7th
- Website: www.fcmagpiesgib.com
Home colors	Away colors

Football Club Magpies, also known as FC Magpies, is a semi-professional football team from Gibraltar. They play in the Gibraltar Football League and the Rock Cup. From 1 June 2025, Calpe City became part of the club.

== History ==
The club was formed in 2013 as Football Club Bruno's Magpies, initially as a group of friends who drank at the Bruno's Bar & Restaurant (a bar in Gibraltar). The club derive their nickname The Magpies from Newcastle United. In its first two seasons, the club achieved respectable mid-table finishes in the Gibraltar Second Division. Mick Embleton was appointed the first manager of the team and was instrumental in the initial setting up, organising and managing of the squad.

With the introduction of Chestertons, a Gibraltarian real estate agent, as the sponsor in 2015–16, the intent grew more serious, with moves to professionalise the club and establish a fanbase with the introduction of matchday programs and incentives for fans who attended games. The club finished fourth in that season and were the runners-up in the Second Division Cup, losing in extra time to Second Division champions Europa Point.

In October 2016, the club appointed Davie Wilson as manager, who has previously been assistant-manager the Gibraltar national football team and had recently departed Gibraltar Premier Division side Lions. The club enjoyed a dominant start to the campaign, however a faltering winter saw them embroiled in a title race with the resurgent Gibraltar Phoenix. Ending the season in second place, they entered the play-off with Manchester 62, who finished 9th in the 2016–17 Gibraltar Premier Division. However, a 3–1 defeat ensured that The Magpies remained in the Second Division for the following season.

In August 2017, the club announced a new sponsorship deal with GVC Holdings. The side finished third in the league that season, however, in May 2019 they completed a league and cup double, securing the Second Division title while also winning the Second Division Cup. After the season concluded, the club announced that former Watford chairman and British Olympian Haig Oundjian had purchased a stake in the club and become co-chairman with Louis Perry.

The appointment of Nathan Rooney midway through the 2021–22 season saw a significant upturn in Magpies' fortunes in the league, with a fourth-place finish and a first Rock Cup final. In June 2022, the club rebranded as FCB Magpies. The next season, along with an overhaul of the club's image, saw more improvement, with a third-place finish and victory in the 2022–23 Rock Cup. However, on 17 May 2023, Rooney announced his departure from the club, only to return as manager on 1 September. A third place finish followed ensuring another season of European football. On 18 July 2024, Magpies knocked Derry City out of the UEFA Conference League qualifying rounds, but were then themselves knocked out in the next round by F.C. Copenhagen after losing 8–1 on aggregate.

On 6 April 2025, after securing their second Rock Cup victory against Lions Gibraltar the week prior, the club announced a merger with youth club Calpe City FC, with the new entity, Calpe City Magpies, officially launching on 1 June 2025. This launch was delayed by a year in June, however, meaning that the club would continue to operate as FC Magpies for one more season, in order to allow the club to compete in UEFA competitions. However, by 2026 all talk of the new club had ceased, with Calpe City instead absorbed into the FC Magpies identity.

== Current squad ==
=== First team ===
As of 29 August 2026.

Note: Flags indicate national team as defined under FIFA eligibility rules; some limited exceptions apply. Players may hold more than one non-FIFA nationality.

No.	Pos.	Nation	Player
1	GK	ARG	Marcos Zappacosta (vice-captain)
2	DF	IDN	Damian van Dijk
3	DF	ARG	Juanma Piedra
4	DF	GIB	Julian Britto
5	DF	ESP	Asier Izquierdo
6	MF	RUS	Aleksandr Grachev
7	MF	GIB	Javan Peacock
8	MF	GIB	Han Stevens
9	FW	ESP	Samu Benítez
10	FW	GIB	Julian Del Rio
11	MF	GIB	Lee Chipolina
12	DF	GIB	Jayce Olivero

No.	Pos.	Nation	Player
15	MF	ESP	Ángel Sánchez Cañaveral
16	MF	GIB	Carl De Torres
17	FW	NED	Björn Schaap
18	MF	ARM	Mihran Semerdzhyan
19	MF	GIB	Kyle Clinton
20	FW	CMR	Dalton Enokpa
21	FW	MDA	Daniil Hagiu
22	GK	CRO	Michael Kulas
23	MF	MAR	Mouad Benaiche
24	MF	USA	Engels Gómez
25	FW	NED	Keone Maho
32	DF	GIB	Kevagn Ronco (captain)

== Club staff ==
Position	Name
Club Management
Head Coach	(Netherlands) Youri Loen
Assistant Head Coach	(Spain) Javi Sánchez
Goalkeeper Coach	(Spain) Francisco Jiménez
Strength & Conditioning Coach	(England) Oli Williams
Head Physiotherapist	(Gibraltar) Jaydan Lara
Equipment Manager	(Gibraltar) Garry Lowe
Analyst	(Spain) Salvador Gómez
Board
Chairman	(England) Haig Oundjian
Vice-chairman	(Gibraltar) Aaron Edwards
Financial Director	(England) Mike Nicholls
Technical Director	(Gibraltar) Terrence Jolley
Youth Development Manager	(Gibraltar) Terrence Jolley
Secretary	(England) David Frier

== Honours ==
- Rock Cup: 2

2022–23, 2024–25

- Pepe Reyes Cup: 1

2023

- GFA Challenge Trophy: 1

2020–21

- Gibraltar Second Division: 1

2018–19

- Gibraltar Division 2 Cup: 1

2018–19

== Club achievements ==
- Best league finish – Third, Gibraltar Football League: 2022–23, 2023–24
- Biggest win – 17–0 vs Hound Dogs, 15 February 2025

== European record ==
Accurate as of match played 17 July 2025

Competition	Played	Won	Drew	Lost	GF	GA	GD	Win%
UEFA Conference League	10	2	1	7	11	24	−13	20.00
Total	10	2	1	7	11	24	−13	20.00

Legend: GF = Goals For. GA = Goals Against. GD = Goal Difference.

Season	Competition	Round	Club	Home	Away	Aggregate
2022–23	UEFA Europa Conference League	1Q	(Northern Ireland) Crusaders	2–1	1–3	3–4
2023–24	UEFA Europa Conference League	1Q	(Republic of Ireland) Dundalk	0–0	1–3	1–3
2024–25	UEFA Conference League	1Q	(Republic of Ireland) Derry City	2–0	1–2 (a.e.t.)	3–2
2024–25	UEFA Conference League	2Q	(Denmark) Copenhagen	0–3	1–5	1–8
2025–26	UEFA Conference League	1Q	(Estonia) Paide Linnameeskond	2–3	1–4	3–7

Notes

- 1Q: First qualifying round
- 2Q: Second qualifying round
