= Republic of Ireland national football team results (2020–present) =

- Win Draw Loss

This article provides details of international football games played by the Republic of Ireland national football team from 2020 to present.

== Results ==
=== 2020 ===
3 September 2020 2020–21 Nations League	Bulgaria	1–1	Republic of Ireland	Sofia, Bulgaria
21:45	Kraev 56'	Report	Duffy 90+3'	Stadium: Vasil Levski National Stadium; Attendance: 0 (Note: Due to the COVID-19 pandemic in Europe, all matches scheduled for September 2020 were played behind closed doors.); Referee: Manuel Schüttengruber (Austria)

6 September 2020 2020–21 Nations League	Republic of Ireland	0–1	Finland	Dublin, Ireland
17:00		Report	Jensen 64'	Stadium: Aviva Stadium; Attendance: 0 Referee: Fabio Maresca (Italy)

8 October 2020 Euro 2020 qualifying play-offs	Slovakia	0–0 (a.e.t.) (4–2 p)	Republic of Ireland	Bratislava, Slovakia
20:45		Report		Stadium: Tehelné pole Attendance: 0 (Note: The Slovakia v Republic of Ireland match was played behind closed doors due to the COVID-19 pandemic in Slovakia.); Referee: Clément Turpin (France)
	Penalties
	Hamšík (penalty scored); Hrošovský (penalty scored); Haraslín (penalty scored); Greguš (penalty scored)		(penalty scored) Hourihane; (penalty scored) Brady; (penalty missed) Browne; (penalty missed) Doherty

11 October 2020 2020–21 Nations League	Republic of Ireland	0–0	Wales	Dublin, Ireland
14:00		Report		Stadium: Aviva Stadium; Attendance: 0 (Note: Due to the COVID-19 pandemic in Europe, the match was played behind closed doors.); Referee: Anastasios Sidiropoulos (Greece)

14 October 2020 2020–21 Nations League	Finland	1–0	Republic of Ireland	Helsinki, Finland
19:00	Jensen 66'	Report		Stadium: Helsinki Olympic Stadium; Attendance: 7,900; Referee: Lionel Tschudi (Switzerland)

12 November 2020 Friendly	England	3–0	Republic of Ireland	London, England
20:00	Maguire 18'; Sancho 31'; Calvert-Lewin 56' (pen.)	Report		Stadium: Wembley Stadium; Attendance: 0 Referee: Carlos del Cerro Grande (Spain)

15 November 2020 2020–21 Nations League	Wales	1–0	Republic of Ireland	Cardiff, Wales
17:00	Brooks 67'	Report		Stadium: Cardiff City Stadium; Attendance: 0 Referee: Petr Ardeleánu (Czech Republic)

18 November 2020 2020–21 Nations League	Republic of Ireland	0–0	Bulgaria	Dublin, Ireland
19:45		Report		Stadium: Aviva Stadium; Attendance: 0 Referee: Lawrence Visser (Belgium)

=== 2021 ===
24 March 2021 2022 World Cup qualification	Serbia	3–2	Republic of Ireland	Belgrade, Serbia
20:45 UTC+1	Vlahović 40'; A. Mitrović 69', 75'	Report	Browne 18'; Collins 86'	Stadium: Stadion Rajko Mitić; Attendance: 0 Referee: Davide Massa (Italy)

27 March 2021 2022 World Cup qualification	Republic of Ireland	0–1	Luxembourg	Dublin, Ireland
19:45 UTC+0		Report	Rodrigues 85'	Stadium: Aviva Stadium; Attendance: 0 Referee: Fran Jović (Croatia)

30 March 2021 Friendly	Qatar	1–1	Republic of Ireland	Debrecen, Hungary
20:45 UTC+2	Muntari 47'	Report	McClean 4'	Stadium: Nagyerdei Stadion; Attendance: 0 Referee: Balázs Berke (Hungary)

3 June 2021 Friendly	Andorra	1–4	Republic of Ireland	Andorra la Vella, Andorra
19:00 UTC+2	Vales 52'	Report	Parrott 58', 61'; Knight 84'; Horgan 89'	Stadium: Estadi Nacional; Attendance: 0 Referee: Xavier Estrada Fernández (Spain)

8 June 2021 Friendly	Hungary	0–0	Republic of Ireland	Budapest, Hungary
20:00 UTC+2		Report		Stadium: Szusza Ferenc Stadion; Attendance: 0 Referee: Daniel Stefański (Poland)

1 September 2021 2022 World Cup qualification	Portugal	2–1	Republic of Ireland	Algarve, Portugal
19:45 UTC+1	Ronaldo 89', 90+6'	Report	Egan 45'	Stadium: Estádio Algarve; Attendance: 7,831; Referee: Matej Jug (Slovenia)

4 September 2021 2022 World Cup qualification	Republic of Ireland	1–1	Azerbaijan	Dublin, Ireland
17:00 UTC+1	Duffy 87'	Report	Mahmudov 45+1'	Stadium: Aviva Stadium; Attendance: 21,287; Referee: Jérôme Brisard (France)

7 September 2021 2022 World Cup qualification	Republic of Ireland	1–1	Serbia	Dublin, Ireland
19:45 UTC+1	Milenković 87' (o.g.)	Report	Milinković-Savić 20'	Stadium: Aviva Stadium; Attendance: 25,415; Referee: José María Sánchez (Spain)

9 October 2021 2022 World Cup qualification	Azerbaijan	0–3	Republic of Ireland	Baku, Azerbaijan
20:00 UTC+4		Report	Robinson 7', 39'; Ogbene 90'	Stadium: Baku Olympic Stadium; Attendance: 6,852; Referee: Espen Eskås (Norway)

12 October 2021 Friendly	Republic of Ireland	4–0	Qatar	Dublin, Ireland
19:45 UTC+0	Robinson 4', 13' (pen.), 53'; Duffy 59'	Report		Stadium: Aviva Stadium; Attendance: 25,749; Referee: Keith Kennedy (Northern Ireland)

11 November 2021 2022 World Cup qualification	Republic of Ireland	0–0	Portugal	Dublin, Ireland
19:45 UTC+0		Report		Stadium: Aviva Stadium; Attendance: 50,373; Referee: Jesús Gil Manzano (Spain)

14 November 2021 2022 World Cup qualification	Luxembourg	0–3	Republic of Ireland	Luxembourg City, Luxembourg
20:45 UTC+1		Report	Duffy 67'; Ogbene 75'; Robinson 88'	Stadium: Stade de Luxembourg; Attendance: 9,268; Referee: Tamás Bognár (Hungary)

=== 2022 ===
26 March 2022 Friendly	Republic of Ireland	2–2	Belgium	Dublin, Ireland
17:00 UTC+0	Ogbene 35'; Browne 85'	Report	Batshuayi 12'; Vanaken 58'	Stadium: Aviva Stadium; Attendance: 48,808; Referee: Nick Walsh (Scotland)

29 March 2022 Friendly	Republic of Ireland	1–0	Lithuania	Dublin, Ireland
18:45 UTC+1	Parrott 90+7'	Report		Stadium: Aviva Stadium; Attendance: 30,686; Referee: Bram Van Driessche (Belgium)

4 June 2022 2022–23 Nations League	Armenia	1–0	Republic of Ireland	Yerevan, Armenia
20:00 UTC+4	Spertsyan 74'	Report		Stadium: Sargsyan Stadium; Attendance: 10,600; Referee: Radu Petrescu (Romania)

8 June 2022 2022–23 Nations League	Republic of Ireland	0–1	Ukraine	Dublin, Ireland
19:45 UTC+1		Report	Tsyhankov 47'	Stadium: Aviva Stadium; Attendance: 40,111; Referee: Filip Glova (Slovakia)

11 June 2022 2022–23 Nations League	Republic of Ireland	3–0	Scotland	Dublin, Ireland
17:00 UTC+1	Browne 20'; Parrott 28'; Obafemi 51'	Report		Stadium: Aviva Stadium; Attendance: 46,927; Referee: Marco Di Bello (Italy)

14 June 2022 2022–23 Nations League	Ukraine	1–1	Republic of Ireland	Łódź, Poland (Note: Played at a neutral venue due to the ongoing Russian invasion of Ukraine.)
20:45 UTC+2	Dovbyk 47'	Report	Collins 31'	Stadium: Stadion Miejski ŁKS; Attendance: 10,641; Referee: Ali Palabıyık (Turkey)

24 September 2022 2022–23 Nations League	Scotland	2–1	Republic of Ireland	Glasgow, Scotland
19:45 UTC+1	Hendry 50'; Christie 81' (pen.)	Report	Egan 18'	Stadium: Hampden Park; Attendance: 48,853; Referee: Sandro Schärer (Switzerland)

27 September 2022 2022–23 Nations League	Republic of Ireland	3–2	Armenia	Dublin, Ireland
19:45 UTC+1	Egan 18'; Obafemi 52'; Brady 90+1' (pen.)	Report	Dashyan 71'; Spertsyan 73'	Stadium: Aviva Stadium; Attendance: 41,719; Referee: Rade Obrenovič (Slovenia)

17 November 2022 Friendly	Republic of Ireland	1–2	Norway	Dublin, Ireland
19:45 UTC+0	Browne 69'	Report	Østigård 41'; Omoijuanfo 85'	Stadium: Aviva Stadium; Attendance: 41,120; Referee: Allard Lindhout (Netherlands)

20 November 2022 Friendly	Malta	0–1	Republic of Ireland	Ta' Qali, Malta
20:00 UTC+2		Report	Robinson 55'	Stadium: Ta' Qali National Stadium; Attendance: 2,500; Referee: Chrysovalantis Theouli (Cyprus)

=== 2023 ===
22 March 2023 Friendly	Republic of Ireland	3–2	Latvia	Dublin, Ireland
19:45 UTC+1	O'Dowda 6'; Ferguson 17'; Ogbene 65'	Report	Uldriķis 33'; Zjuzins 45+1'	Stadium: Aviva Stadium; Attendance: 41,211; Referee: Andrei Chivulete (Romania)

27 March 2023 Euro 2024 qualifying	Republic of Ireland	0–1	France	Dublin, Ireland
19:45 UTC+1		Report	Pavard 50'	Stadium: Aviva Stadium; Attendance: 50,219; Referee: Artur Soares Dias (Portugal)

16 June 2023 Euro 2024 qualifying	Greece	2–1	Republic of Ireland	Athens, Greece
21:45 UTC+1	Bakasetas 15' (pen.); Masouras 49'	Report	Collins 29' Doherty (red card) 90+5'	Stadium: Agia Sophia Stadium; Attendance: 17,452; Referee: Harald Lechner (Austria)

19 June 2023 Euro 2024 qualifying	Republic of Ireland	3–0	Gibraltar	Dublin, Ireland
19:45 UTC+1	Johnston 52'; Ferguson 59'; Idah 90+2'	Report		Stadium: Aviva Stadium; Attendance: 42,156; Referee: Marian Barbu (Romania)

7 September 2023 Euro 2024 qualifying	France	2–0	Republic of Ireland	Paris, France
20:45 UTC+2	Tchouaméni 19'; Thuram 48'	Report		Stadium: Parc des Princes; Attendance: 43,995; Referee: Urs Schnyder (Switzerland)

10 September 2023 Euro 2024 qualifying	Republic of Ireland	1–2	Netherlands	Dublin, Ireland
19:45 UTC+1	Idah 4' (pen.)	Report	Gakpo 19' (pen.); Weghorst 56'	Stadium: Aviva Stadium; Attendance: 49,807; Referee: Irfan Peljto (Bosnia and Herzegovina)

13 October 2023 Euro 2024 qualifying	Republic of Ireland	0–2	Greece	Dublin, Ireland
19:45 UTC+1		Report	Giakoumakis 20'; Masouras 45+4'	Stadium: Aviva Stadium; Attendance: 41,239; Referee: Glenn Nyberg (Sweden)

16 October 2023 Euro 2024 qualifying	Gibraltar	0–4	Republic of Ireland	Faro, Portugal
20:45 UTC+2		Report	Ferguson 8'; Johnston 28'; Doherty 60'; Robinson 80'	Stadium: Estádio Algarve; Attendance: 4,000; Referee: Christian-Petru Ciochirca (Austria)

18 November 2023 Euro 2024 qualifying	Netherlands	1–0	Republic of Ireland	Amsterdam, Netherlands
20:45 UTC+1	Weghorst 11'	Report		Stadium: Johan Cruyff Arena; Attendance: 51,811; Referee: Marco Di Bello (Italy)

21 November 2023 Friendly	Republic of Ireland	1–1	New Zealand	Dublin, Ireland
19:45 UTC+0	Idah 28'	Report	Garbett 59'	Stadium: Aviva Stadium; Attendance: 26,517; Referee: Urs Schnyder (Switzerland)

=== 2024 ===
23 March 2024 Friendly	Republic of Ireland	0–0	Belgium	Dublin, Ireland
17:00 UTC+0		Report		Stadium: Aviva Stadium; Attendance: 38,128; Referee: Rohit Saggi (Norway)

26 March 2024 Friendly	Republic of Ireland	0–1	Switzerland	Dublin, Ireland
19:45 UTC+0		Report	Shaqiri 23'	Stadium: Aviva Stadium; Attendance: 35,742; Referee: Paweł Raczkowski (Poland)

4 June 2024 Friendly	Republic of Ireland	2–1	Hungary	Dublin, Ireland
19:45 UTC+1	Idah 36'; Parrott 90+2'	Report	Lang 40'	Stadium: Aviva Stadium; Attendance: 29,424; Referee: Luís Godinho (Portugal)

11 June 2024 Friendly	Portugal	3–0	Republic of Ireland	Aveiro, Portugal
19:45 UTC+1	Félix 18'; Ronaldo 50' 60'	Report		Stadium: Estádio Municipal de Aveiro; Attendance: 27,024; Referee: Chris Kavanagh (England)

7 September 2024 2024–25 Nations League	Republic of Ireland	0–2	England	Dublin, Ireland
17:00 BST		Report	Rice 11'; Grealish 26'	Stadium: Aviva Stadium; Attendance: 55,359; Referee: José María Sánchez (Spain)

10 September 2024 2024–25 Nations League	Republic of Ireland	0–2	Greece	Dublin, Ireland
19:45 UTC+1		Report	Ioannidis 50'; Tzolis 87'	Stadium: Aviva Stadium; Attendance: 37,274; Referee: Espen Eskås (Norway)

10 October 2024 2024–25 Nations League	Finland	1–2	Republic of Ireland	Helsinki, Finland
21:45 UTC+3	Pohjanpalo 17'	Report	Scales 57'; Brady 88'	Stadium: Helsinki Olympic Stadium; Attendance: 16,105; Referee: Aleksandar Stavrev (North Macedonia)

13 October 2024 2024–25 Nations League	Greece	2–0	Republic of Ireland	Piraeus, Greece
21:45 UTC+3	Bakasetas 48'; Mantalos 90+1'	Report		Stadium: Karaiskakis Stadium; Attendance: 30,253; Referee: Joey Kooij (Netherlands)

14 November 2024 2024–25 Nations League	Republic of Ireland	1–0	Finland	Dublin, Ireland
19:45 UTC+0	Ferguson 45'	Report	Pohjanpalo (penalty missed) 77'	Stadium: Aviva Stadium; Attendance: 39,163; Referee: Aleksandar Stavrev (North Macedonia)

17 November 2024 2024–25 Nations League	England	5–0	Republic of Ireland	London, England
17:00 UTC+0	Kane 53' (pen.); Gordon 55'; Gallagher 58'; Bowen 76'; Harwood-Bellis 79'	Report	Scales (yellow card) 43' (yellow-red card) 51'	Stadium: Wembley Stadium; Attendance: 79,969; Referee: Erik Lambrechts (Belgium)

=== 2025 ===
20 March 2025 2024–25 Nations League relegation play-offs	Bulgaria	1–2	Republic of Ireland	Plovdiv, Bulgaria
21:45 UTC+2	Petkov 6'	Report	Azaz 22'; Doherty 42'	Stadium: Stadion Hristo Botev; Attendance: 7,835; Referee: Benoît Bastien (France)

23 March 2025 2024–25 Nations League relegation play-offs	Republic of Ireland	2–1 (4–2 agg.)	Bulgaria	Dublin, Ireland
19:45 UTC+0	Ferguson 63'; Idah 84'	Report	Antov 30'	Stadium: Aviva Stadium; Attendance: 40,156; Referee: Halil Umut Meler (Turkey)

6 June 2025 Friendly	Republic of Ireland	1–1	Senegal	Dublin, Ireland
19:45 UTC+1	McAteer 21'	Report	Sarr 82'	Stadium: Aviva Stadium; Attendance: 32,478; Referee: Adam Ladebäck (Sweden)

10 June 2025 Friendly	Luxembourg	0–0	Republic of Ireland	Luxembourg City, Luxembourg
20:45 UTC+1		Report		Stadium: Stade de Luxembourg; Attendance: 6,312; Referee: Stefan Ebner (Austria)

6 September 2025 2026 World Cup qualification	Republic of Ireland	2–2	Hungary	Dublin, Ireland
19:45 UTC+1	Ferguson 49'; Idah 90+3'	Report	Varga 2'; Sallai 15' (red card) 52'	Stadium: Aviva Stadium; Attendance: 50,137; Referee: Harm Osmers (Germany)

9 September 2025 2026 World Cup qualification	Armenia	2–1	Republic of Ireland	Yerevan, Armenia
20:00 UTC+4	Spertsyan 45+1' (pen.); Ranos 51'	Report	Ferguson 57'	Stadium: Vazgen Sargsyan Republican Stadium; Attendance: 13,144; Referee: Goga Kikacheishvili (Georgia)

11 October 2025 2026 World Cup qualification	Portugal	1–0	Republic of Ireland	Lisbon, Portugal
19:45 UTC+1 or 20:45 UTC+2	Neves 90+1'	Report		Stadium: Estádio José Alvalade; Attendance: 48,821; Referee: Ivan Kružliak (Slovakia)

14 October 2025 2026 World Cup qualification	Republic of Ireland	1–0	Armenia	Dublin, Ireland
19:45 UTC+1	Ferguson 70'	Report	Barseghyan (red card) 52'	Stadium: Aviva Stadium; Attendance: 42,292; Referee: Benoît Bastien (France)

13 November 2025 2026 World Cup qualification	Republic of Ireland	2–0	Portugal	Dublin, Ireland
19:45 UTC+0	Parrott 17', 45'	Report	Ronaldo (red card) 61'	Stadium: Aviva Stadium; Attendance: 50,717; Referee: Glenn Nyberg (Sweden)

16 November 2025 2026 World Cup qualification	Hungary	2–3	Republic of Ireland	Budapest, Hungary
15:00 UTC+1	Luckas 4'; Varga 37'	Report	Parrott 15' (pen.), 80', 90+6'	Stadium: Puskás Aréna; Attendance: 59,411; Referee: Espen Eskås (Norway)

=== 2026 ===
26 March 2026 2026 World Cup qualification play-offs	Czech Republic	2–2 (a.e.t.) (4–3 p)	Republic of Ireland	Prague, Czech Republic
20:45 UTC+1	Schick 27' (pen.); Krejcí 86'	Report	Parrott 19' (pen.); Kovar 23' (o.g.)	Stadium: Fortuna Arena; Attendance: 19,137; Referee: Glenn Nyberg (Sweden)
	Penalties
	Krejcí (penalty scored); Soucek (penalty scored); Chytil (penalty missed); Schick (penalty scored); Kliment (penalty scored)		(penalty scored) Parrott; (penalty scored) Idah; (penalty scored) Brady; (penalty missed) Azaz; (penalty missed) Browne

31 March 2026 Friendly	Republic of Ireland	0–0	North Macedonia	Dublin, Ireland
19:45 UTC+1		Report		Stadium: Aviva Stadium; Attendance: 39,560; Referee: Iwan Arwel Griffith (Wales)

12 May 2026 Unofficial friendly	Real Murcia Imperial (Spain)	0–2	Republic of Ireland	Alicante, Spain
		Report	Alli 18'; Idah 90'	Stadium: La Finca Resort Training Centre; Attendance: 0 (closed-door match)

16 May 2026 Friendly	Grenada	0–5	Republic of Ireland	Murcia, Spain
18:00 UTC+2		Report	Cannon 47', 56'; Moylan 62', 81', 84'	Stadium: Estadio Nueva Condomina; Attendance: 862; Referee: Seth Galia (Gibraltar)

28 May 2026 Friendly	Republic of Ireland	1–0	Qatar	Dublin, Ireland
19:45 UTC+1	Collins 5'	Report		Stadium: Aviva Stadium; Attendance: 28,891; Referee: Jamie Robinson (Northern Ireland)

5 June 2026 Friendly	Canada	1–1	Republic of Ireland	Montreal, Canada
19:30 UTC−4	O'Brien 23' (o.g.)	Report	Parrott (penalty missed) 60'; Ogbene 60'	Stadium: Saputo Stadium; Attendance: 19,619; Referee: Pablo Camacho (Costa Rica)

24 September 2026 2026–27 Nations League	Kosovo	1–0	Republic of Ireland	Pristina, Kosovo
20:45	Muriqi 83'	Report		Stadium: Fadil Vokrri Stadium; Attendance: 12,627; Referee: Lawrence Visser (Belgium)

27 September 2026 2026–27 Nations League	Israel	0–3	Republic of Ireland	Debrecen, Hungary (Note: Due to the Gaza war, Israel are required to play their home matches at neutral venues until further notice.)
20:45		Report	Parrott 14'; Idah 16'; Moylan 25'	Stadium: Nagyerdei Stadion; Attendance: 319; Referee: Harm Osmers (Germany)

1 October 2026 2026–27 Nations League	Republic of Ireland	2–2	Austria	Dublin, Ireland
19:45 UTC+1	Parrott 12', 45' (pen.)	Report	Prass 71'; Gregoritsch 77'	Stadium: Aviva Stadium; Attendance: 45,784; Referee: Allard Lindhout (Netherlands)

4 October 2026 2026–27 Nations League	Republic of Ireland	1–1	Israel	Bačka Topola, Serbia (Note: Moved from Ireland to Serbia after the FAI Board decided to move the fixture to a neutral territory due to "operational challenges that could impact on the delivery of the game on home soil.")
19:45 UTC+1	Parrott 39' (pen.)	Report	D. Peretz 47'	Stadium: TSC Arena; Attendance: 0 (Behind closed doors); Referee: Juan Martínez Munuera (Spain)

14 November 2026 2026–27 Nations League	Austria	1–0	Republic of Ireland	Vienna, Austria
20:45	Kalajdžić 78'	Report		Stadium: Ernst-Happel-Stadion; Attendance: 16,700; Referee: Irfan Peljto (Bosnia and Herzegovina)

17 November 2026 2026–27 Nations League	Republic of Ireland	3–0	Kosovo	Dublin, Ireland
19:45 UTC+1	Parrott 28' (pen.), 50' (pen.); Moylan 75'	Report		Stadium: Aviva Stadium; Attendance: 50,381; Referee: Edgars Maļcevs (Latvia)

=== 2027 ===
27 March 2027 2026–27 Nations League promotion play-off, first leg	Republic of Ireland	v	Croatia	Dublin, Ireland
19:45 UTC+0		Report		Stadium: Aviva Stadium

30 March 2027 2026–27 Nations League promotion play-off, second leg	Croatia	v	Republic of Ireland	Croatia
20:45 UTC+1		Report
