= UEFA Euro 2024 qualifying Group B =

Group B of UEFA Euro 2024 qualifying was one of the ten groups to decide which teams would qualify for the UEFA Euro 2024 final tournament in Germany. Group B consisted of five teams: France, Gibraltar, Greece, the Netherlands and the Republic of Ireland. The teams played against each other home-and-away in a round-robin format.

The top two teams, France and the Netherlands, qualified directly for the final tournament. The participants of the qualifying play-offs were decided based on their performance in the 2022–23 UEFA Nations League.

== Standings ==
Pos	Team	Pld	W	D	L	GF	GA	GD	Pts	Qualification	(France)	(Netherlands)	(Greece)	(Republic of Ireland)	(Gibraltar)
1	France	8	7	1	0	29	3	+26	22	Qualify for final tournament	—	4–0	1–0	2–0	14–0
2	Netherlands	8	6	0	2	17	7	+10	18	Qualify for final tournament	1–2	—	3–0	1–0	3–0
3	Greece	8	4	1	3	14	8	+6	13	Advance to play-offs via Nations League	2–2	0–1	—	2–1	5–0
4	Republic of Ireland	8	2	0	6	9	10	−1	6		0–1	1–2	0–2	—	3–0
5	Gibraltar	8	0	0	8	0	41	−41	0		0–3	0–6	0–3	0–4	—

Source: UEFA
Rules for classification: Qualification tiebreakers

== Matches ==
The fixture list was confirmed by UEFA on 10 October 2022, the day after the draw. Times are CET/CEST, (Note: CET (UTC+1) for matches until 25 March and from 29 October (matchday 1 and 9–10), and CEST (UTC+2) for matches from 26 March to 28 October 2023 (matchday 2–8).) as listed by UEFA (local times, if different, are in parentheses).

24 March 2023
20:45

France	4–0	Netherlands
Griezmann 2'; Upamecano 8'; Mbappé 21', 88'	Report

Stade de France, Saint-Denis
Attendance: 77,328
Referee: Maurizio Mariani (Italy)
24 March 2023
20:45 (19:45 UTC±0)

Gibraltar	0–3	Greece
	Report	Masouras 11'; Siopis 45'; Bakasetas 58'

Estádio Algarve, Faro/Loulé (Portugal) (Note: Gibraltar played their home matches at Estádio Algarve, Faro/Loulé, Portugal, due to the redevelopment of their regular stadium Victoria Stadium, Gibraltar.)
Attendance: 390
Referee: Rohit Saggi (Norway)

27 March 2023
20:45

Netherlands	3–0	Gibraltar
Depay 23'; Aké 50', 82'	Report

De Kuip, Rotterdam
Attendance: 36,327
Referee: Morten Krogh (Denmark)
27 March 2023
20:45 (19:45 UTC+1)

Republic of Ireland	0–1	France
	Report	Pavard 50'

Aviva Stadium, Dublin
Attendance: 50,219
Referee: Artur Soares Dias (Portugal)

16 June 2023
20:45 (19:45 UTC+1)

Gibraltar	0–3	France
	Report	Giroud 3'; Mbappé 45+3' (pen.); Mouelhi 78' (o.g.)

Estádio Algarve, Faro/Loulé (Portugal)
Attendance: 4,065
Referee: Yevhen Aranovskyi (Ukraine)
16 June 2023
20:45 (21:45 UTC+3)

Greece	2–1	Republic of Ireland
Bakasetas 15' (pen.); Masouras 49'	Report	Collins 27'

Agia Sophia Stadium, Athens
Attendance: 17,452
Referee: Harald Lechner (Austria)

19 June 2023
20:45

France	1–0	Greece
Mbappé 55' (pen.)	Report

Stade de France, Saint-Denis
Attendance: 76,500
Referee: Antonio Mateu Lahoz (Spain)
19 June 2023
20:45 (19:45 UTC+1)

Republic of Ireland	3–0	Gibraltar
Johnston 52'; Ferguson 59'; Idah 90+2'	Report

Aviva Stadium, Dublin
Attendance: 42,156
Referee: Marian Alexandru Barbu (Romania)

7 September 2023
20:45

France	2–0	Republic of Ireland
Tchouaméni 19'; Thuram 48'	Report

Parc des Princes, Paris
Attendance: 43,995
Referee: Urs Schnyder (Switzerland)
7 September 2023
20:45

Netherlands	3–0	Greece
De Roon 17'; Gakpo 31'; Weghorst 39'	Report

Philips Stadion, Eindhoven
Attendance: 32,079
Referee: Michael Oliver (England)

10 September 2023
20:45 (21:45 UTC+3)

Greece	5–0	Gibraltar
Pelkas 9'; Mavropanos 23', 83'; Masouras 70', 90+1'	Report

Agia Sophia Stadium, Athens
Attendance: 9,774
Referee: Manfredas Lukjančukas (Lithuania)
10 September 2023
20:45 (19:45 UTC+1)

Republic of Ireland	1–2	Netherlands
Idah 5' (pen.)	Report	Gakpo 19' (pen.); Weghorst 56'

Aviva Stadium, Dublin
Attendance: 49,807
Referee: Irfan Peljto (Bosnia and Herzegovina)

13 October 2023
20:45

Netherlands	1–2	France
Hartman 83'	Report	Mbappé 7', 53'

Johan Cruyff Arena, Amsterdam
Attendance: 51,310
Referee: Felix Zwayer (Germany)
13 October 2023
20:45 (19:45 UTC+1)

Republic of Ireland	0–2	Greece
	Report	Giakoumakis 20'; Masouras 45+4'

Aviva Stadium, Dublin
Attendance: 41,239
Referee: Glenn Nyberg (Sweden)

16 October 2023
20:45 (19:45 UTC+1)

Gibraltar	0–4	Republic of Ireland
	Report	Ferguson 8'; Johnston 28'; Doherty 60'; Robinson 80'

Estádio Algarve, Faro/Loulé (Portugal)
Attendance: 4,000
Referee: Christian-Petru Ciochirca (Austria)
16 October 2023
20:45 (21:45 UTC+3)

Greece	0–1	Netherlands
	Report	Van Dijk 90+3' (pen.)

Agia Sophia Stadium, Athens
Attendance: 24,967
Referee: Alejandro Hernández Hernández (Spain)

18 November 2023
20:45

France	14–0	Gibraltar
Santos 3' (o.g.); Thuram 4'; Zaïre-Emery 16'; Mbappé 30' (pen.), 74', 82'; Clauss 34'; Coman 36', 65'; Fofana 37'; Rabiot 63'; Dembélé 73'; Giroud 89', 90+1'	Report

Allianz Riviera, Nice
Attendance: 32,758
Referee: John Brooks (England)
18 November 2023
20:45

Netherlands	1–0	Republic of Ireland
Weghorst 12'	Report

Johan Cruyff Arena, Amsterdam
Attendance: 51,811
Referee: Marco Di Bello (Italy)

21 November 2023
20:45 (19:45 UTC±0)

Gibraltar	0–6	Netherlands
	Report	Stengs 10', 50', 62'; Wieffer 23'; Koopmeiners 38'; Gakpo 81'

Estádio Algarve, Faro/Loulé (Portugal)
Attendance: 2,280
Referee: Arda Kardeşler (Turkey)
21 November 2023
20:45 (21:45 UTC+2)

Greece	2–2	France
Bakasetas 56'; Ioannidis 61'	Report	Kolo Muani 42'; Fofana 74'

Agia Sophia Stadium, Athens
Attendance: 24,820
Referee: Daniel Siebert (Germany)

== Goalscorers ==
There were 69 goals scored in 20 matches, for an average of 3.45 goals per match.

9 goals

- (France national football team) Kylian Mbappé

5 goals

- (Greece national football team) Georgios Masouras

3 goals

- (France national football team) Olivier Giroud
- (Greece national football team) Anastasios Bakasetas
- (Netherlands national football team) Cody Gakpo
- (Netherlands national football team) Calvin Stengs
- (Netherlands national football team) Wout Weghorst

2 goals

- (France national football team) Kingsley Coman
- (France national football team) Youssouf Fofana
- (France national football team) Marcus Thuram
- (Greece national football team) Konstantinos Mavropanos
- (Netherlands national football team) Nathan Aké
- (Republic of Ireland national football team) Evan Ferguson
- (Republic of Ireland national football team) Adam Idah
- (Republic of Ireland national football team) Mikey Johnston

1 goal

- (France national football team) Jonathan Clauss
- (France national football team) Ousmane Dembélé
- (France national football team) Antoine Griezmann
- (France national football team) Randal Kolo Muani
- (France national football team) Benjamin Pavard
- (France national football team) Adrien Rabiot
- (France national football team) Aurélien Tchouaméni
- (France national football team) Dayot Upamecano
- (France national football team) Warren Zaïre-Emery
- (Greece national football team) Giorgos Giakoumakis
- (Greece national football team) Fotis Ioannidis
- (Greece national football team) Dimitrios Pelkas
- (Greece national football team) Manolis Siopis
- (Netherlands national football team) Memphis Depay
- (Netherlands national football team) Marten de Roon
- (Netherlands national football team) Quilindschy Hartman
- (Netherlands national football team) Teun Koopmeiners
- (Netherlands national football team) Virgil van Dijk
- (Netherlands national football team) Mats Wieffer
- (Republic of Ireland national football team) Nathan Collins
- (Republic of Ireland national football team) Matt Doherty
- (Republic of Ireland national football team) Callum Robinson

1 own goal

- (Gibraltar national football team) Aymen Mouelhi (against France)
- (Gibraltar national football team) Ethan Santos (against France)

== Discipline ==
A player was automatically suspended for the next match for the following offences:

- Receiving a red card (red card suspensions could be extended for serious offences)
- Receiving three yellow cards in three different matches, as well as after fifth and any subsequent yellow card (yellow card suspensions could be carried forward to the play-offs, but not the finals or any other future international matches)

The following suspensions were served during the qualifying matches:

Team	Player	Offence(s)	Suspended for match(es)
Gibraltar	Liam Walker	(red card) vs Netherlands (27 March 2023)	vs France (16 June 2023)
Gibraltar	Ethan Santos	(red card) vs France (18 November 2023)	vs Netherlands (21 November 2023)
Greece	Konstantinos Mavropanos	(red card) vs France (19 June 2023)	vs Netherlands (7 September 2023)
Greece	Dimitrios Kourbelis	(yellow card) vs France (19 June 2023); (yellow card) vs Netherlands (7 September 2023); (yellow card) vs Netherlands (16 October 2023)	vs France (21 November 2023)
Greece	Petros Mantalos	(yellow card) vs Ireland (16 June 2023); (yellow card) vs Netherlands (7 September 2023); (yellow card) vs Netherlands (16 October 2023)	vs France (21 November 2023)
Netherlands	Denzel Dumfries	(yellow card) (yellow-red card) vs Argentina in 2022 FIFA World Cup (9 December 2022)	vs France (24 March 2023)
Republic of Ireland	Matt Doherty	(red card) vs Greece (16 June 2023)	vs Gibraltar (19 June 2023)
