= France v Gibraltar (UEFA Euro 2024 qualifying) =

2023 football match

UEFA Euro 2024 qualifying Group B
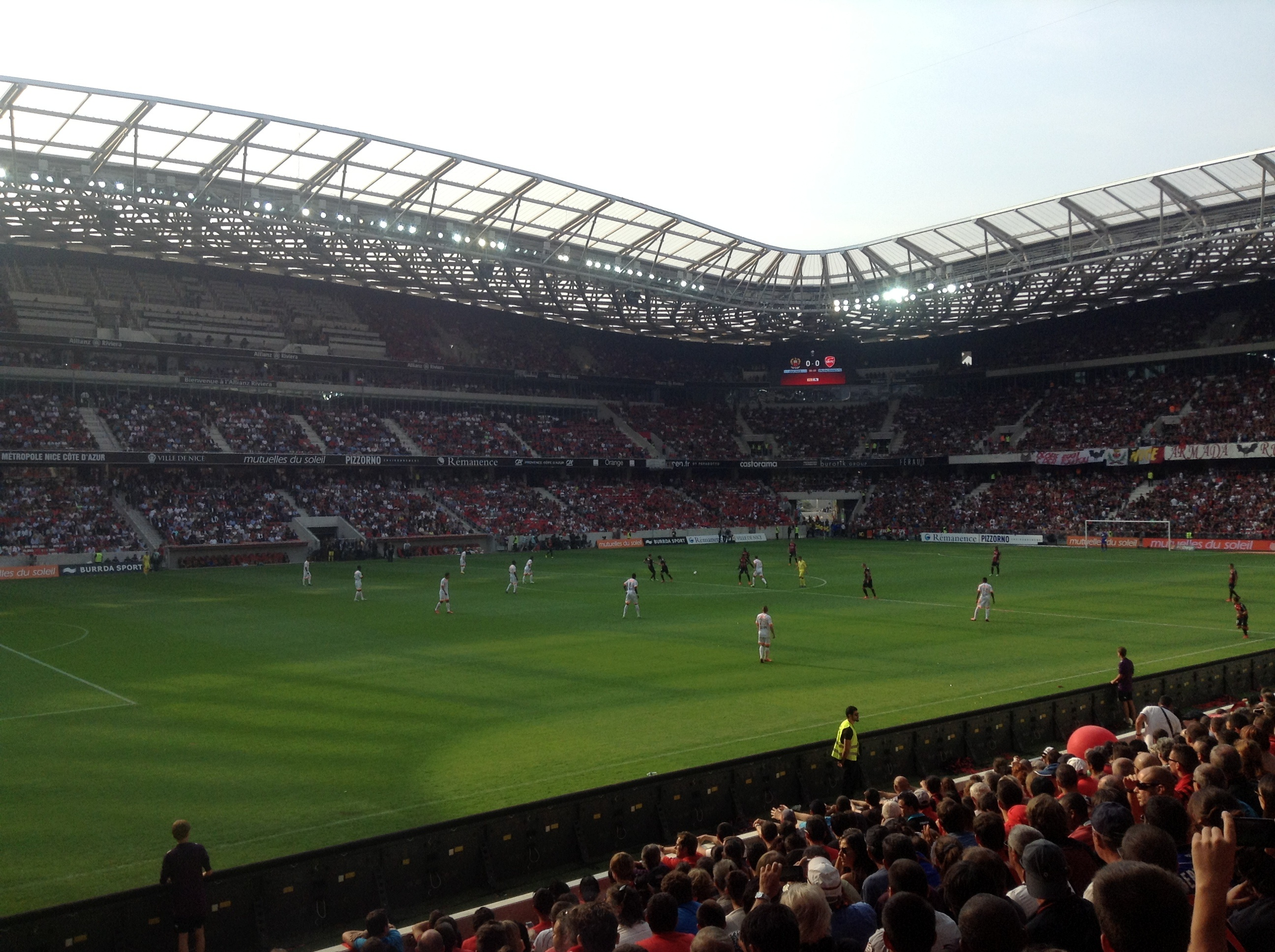
- The pitch at the Allianz Riviera, the venue for the match.
- Event: UEFA Euro 2024 qualifying
| France | Gibraltar |
| (France) | (Gibraltar) |
| 14 | 0 |
- Date: 18 November 2023
- Venue: Allianz Riviera, Nice, France
- Man of the Match: Kylian Mbappé (France)
- Referee: John Brooks (England)
- Attendance: 32,758
- Weather: Clear; 12 °C (54 °F); 54% humidity

On 18 November 2023, the France and Gibraltar national football teams played at the Allianz Riviera in Nice in a UEFA Euro 2024 qualifying match attended by 32,758 spectators.

France won 14–0, recording the largest victory in their history and the largest winning margin in UEFA European Championship qualifying. The result secured France first place in Group B and was the largest defeat in Gibraltar's history.

== Background ==
The match was the 17th in Group B of the Euro 2024 qualifiers, and the second-to-last qualifying match for both France and Gibraltar. The hosting stadium was the Allianz Riviera in Nice. Nearly 33,000 spectators were in attendance to watch the match.

== Match ==
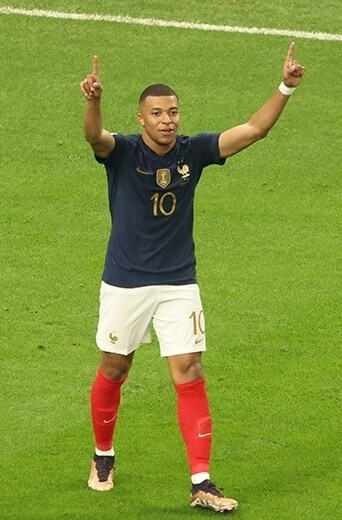
Kylian Mbappé scored a hat-trick during the match and was declared the player of the match.

The match kicked off at 20:45 local time. In the 3rd minute, Jonathan Clauss raced into the box and crossed for Marcus Thuram, but Gibraltar's Ethan Santos deflected the ball into his own net as he tried to counter. Moments later, Kylian Mbappé delivered a pass to Antoine Griezmann, who broke into the box and shot; the goalkeeper Dayle Coleing pushed back but failed to grasp the ball, leaving Thuram free to dispatch it into the back of the net. Eleven minutes later, Kingsley Coman advanced into the box, crossing to Warren Zaïre-Emery who catapulted the ball into the net before being injured in a tackle by Santos, who was shown a red card moments later for the challenge. In the 28th minute, Clauss crossed into the box, but the ball was too far away to reach Théo Hernandez and Lee Casciaro, who were in a duel. The latter touched the ball with his hand, giving France a penalty kick, which was converted by Mbappé. In the 34th minute, Clauss struck a long-range shot from 25 metres out, sending the ball into the back of the net to make it 5–0. Coman picked up the ball two minutes later and sent it into the net in the 36th minute after Mbappé's volley from Hernandez's cross was parried by the goalkeeper. Again from 25 yards out, Youssouf Fofana hit the ball hard from outside the box and into the net. The whistle blew for half-time, with France 7–0 up.

The second half kicked off, and in the 63rd minute, Griezmann played a corner into the penalty spot, where the keeper initially pushed it away, but Adrien Rabiot recovered and shot three times, each time being thwarted, until his fourth attempt finally found the net. Moments later, Coman broke into the box, passed to Mbappé, who passed back to him, and Coman shot just over the keeper for the ninth goal. In the 73rd minute, Ousmane Dembélé shot for goal near the left-hand corner of the Gibraltar box and found the back of the net. A minute later, Hernandez raced into the box and passed to Mbappé, who scored his second goal of the game. In the 78th minute, Clauss crossed into the box and the ball fell to Mbappé, who lost the ball to Olivier Giroud, who took it out of the hands of the Gibraltar defenders before passing it back to Mbappé. The latter passed one last time to Giroud, whose left-footed cross-shot from the right was magnificent, but the goal was disallowed for offside. In the 82nd minute, Mbappé struck a powerful lob near the centre circle that found the back of the net. In the 89th minute, Youssouf Fofana crossed to Griezmann, who passed to Giroud, who beat the keeper to score the 13th goal. The final goal came in stoppage time, as Hernandez shot into the box but the goalkeeper pushed it away. The ball fell to Giroud, who volleyed home to make the final scoreline 14–0.

== Details ==
18 November 2023
20:45

| France | 14–0 | Gibraltar |
|---|---|---|
| Santos 3' (o.g.); Thuram 4'; Zaïre-Emery 16'; Mbappé 30' (pen.), 74', 82'; Clauss 34'; Coman 36', 65'; Fofana 37'; Rabiot 63'; Dembélé 73'; Giroud 89', 90+1' | Report |

Allianz Riviera, Nice, France
Attendance: 32,758
Referee: John Brooks (England)

| France | Gibraltar |

| GK | 16 | Mike Maignan |
| RB | 2 | Jonathan Clauss |
| CB | 13 | Jean-Clair Todibo |
| CB | 4 | Dayot Upamecano | (substituted off) 81' |
| LB | 22 | Théo Hernandez |
| RM | 7 | Antoine Griezmann |
| CM | 8 | Warren Zaïre-Emery | (substituted off) 20' |
| CM | 14 | Adrien Rabiot | (substituted off) 66' |
| LM | 20 | Kingsley Coman | (substituted off) 66' |
| SS | 10 | Kylian Mbappé (c) |
| CF | 15 | Marcus Thuram | (substituted off) 66' |
Substitutes:
| GK | 1 | Brice Samba |
| GK | 23 | Alphonse Areola |
| DF | 3 | Axel Disasi |
| DF | 5 | Jules Koundé |
| DF | 17 | William Saliba | (substituted on) 81' |
| DF | 21 | Lucas Hernandez |
| MF | 6 | Khéphren Thuram |
| MF | 18 | Boubacar Kamara |
| MF | 19 | Youssouf Fofana | (substituted on) 20' |
| FW | 9 | Olivier Giroud | (substituted on) 66' |
| FW | 11 | Ousmane Dembélé | (substituted on) 66' |
| FW | 12 | Randal Kolo Muani | (substituted on) 66' |
Manager:
Didier Deschamps

| GK | 23 | Dayle Coleing |
| RB | 15 | Ethan Santos | (red card) 18' |
| CB | 14 | Roy Chipolina (c) |
| CB | 11 | Evan De Haro |
| LB | 16 | Aymen Mouelhi |
| CM | 4 | Jack Sergeant |
| CM | 6 | Nicholas Pozo |
| CM | 3 | Joseph Chipolina | (substituted off) 61' |
| AM | 10 | Liam Walker | (substituted off) 61' |
| CF | 19 | Tjay De Barr | (substituted off) 81' |
| CF | 7 | Lee Casciaro |
Substitutes:
| GK | 1 | Bradley Banda |
| GK | 13 | Christian López |
| DF | 2 | Ethan Jolley | (substituted on) 61' |
| DF | 5 | Kevagn Ronco |
| DF | 12 | Jayce Olivero | (substituted on) 61' |
| MF | 8 | Mohamed Badr Hassan |
| MF | 17 | Michael Ruiz |
| MF | 18 | Anthony Hernandez |
| MF | 20 | Scott Ballantine |
| MF | 22 | Dylan Peacock |
| FW | 9 | Ayoub El Hmidi |
| FW | 21 | Jamie Coombes | (substituted on) 81' |
Manager:
Julio César Ribas

== Post-match ==
The win became the largest victory in the history of the France national team, surpassing their previous record of 10–0 against Azerbaijan in 1995. It was also the biggest win in European Championship qualifying history, exceeding Germany's 13–0 triumph over San Marino in 2006. Kylian Mbappé was named man of the match after registering a hat-trick and two assists.

France drew 2–2 against Greece in their final match, confirming their position at the top of Group B and securing automatic qualification for the tournament. From their eight games, their final statistics were seven wins and one draw, with 29 goals scored and 3 conceded. Meanwhile, Gibraltar were defeated in their final game 6–0 against the Netherlands. They finished at the bottom of Group B after losing all eight of their matches, scoring no goals while conceding 41.

== See also ==
- UEFA Euro 1996 qualifying
- UEFA Euro 2024 qualifying
- France v Azerbaijan (UEFA Euro 1996 qualifying)
