= Warren Zaïre-Emery =

French footballer (born 2006)

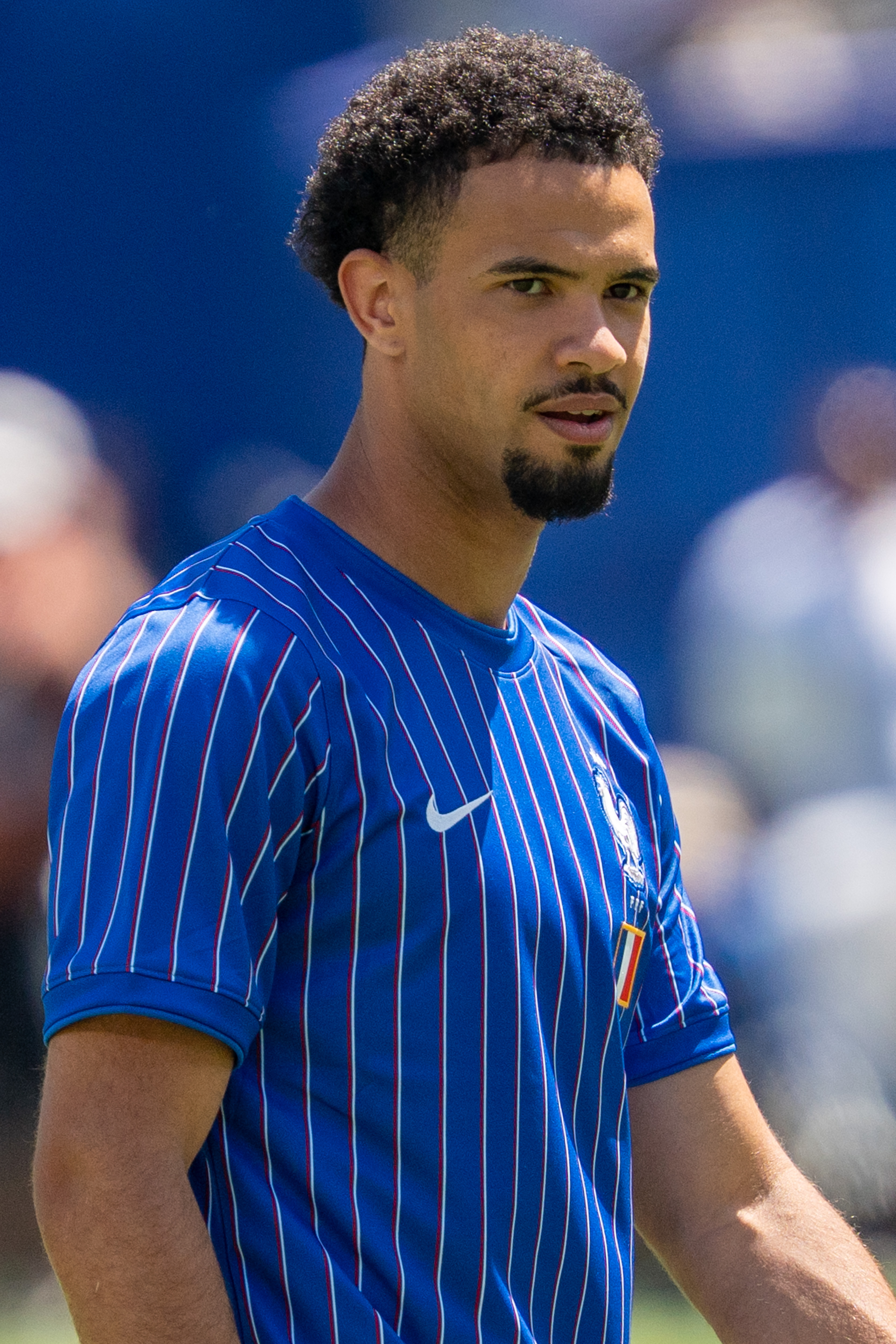
- Zaïre-Emery with France in 2026

Personal information
- Full name: Warren Marie Jean-Pierre Zaïre-Emery
- Date of birth: 8 March 2006 (age 20)
- Place of birth: Montreuil, Seine-Saint-Denis, France
- Height: 1.78 m (5 ft 10 in)
- Positions: Central midfielder; full-back

Team information
- Current team: Paris Saint-Germain
- Number: 33

Youth career
- 2011–2014: Aubervilliers
- 2014–2022: Paris Saint-Germain

Senior career*
Years	Team	Apps	(Gls)
2022–	Paris Saint-Germain	124	(8)

International career^{‡}
2021	France U16	2	(0)
2022	France U17	9	(2)
2022–2023	France U18	6	(0)
2022–2023	France U19	6	(0)
2023–	France U21	6	(0)
2023–	France	14	(1)
Medal record
Men's football
Representing France
UEFA Nations League
Third place	2025 Germany
UEFA European Under-17 Championship
Winner	2022 Israel
- * Club domestic league appearances and goals as of 18:18, 21 November 2026 (UTC) ‡ National team caps and goals as of 21:38, 15 Novembre 2026 (UTC)

Warren Marie Jean-Pierre Zaïre-Emery (born 8 March 2006) is a French professional footballer who plays as a central midfielder or full-back for Ligue 1 club Paris Saint-Germain and the France national team.

A product of the Paris Saint-Germain Youth Academy, Zaïre-Emery made his professional debut for PSG in August 2022, becoming the club's youngest-ever player. In his debut season, he became the club's youngest-ever goalscorer and the youngest player in UEFA Champions League history to start a knockout phase match, all at the age of 16, before winning his maiden Ligue 1 title. In his second season, he solidified his place as a starter and won a domestic double, before helping PSG win a first-ever continental treble in his third season.

At the youth international level, Zaïre-Emery has represented France from the under-16 to under-21 levels. In September 2023, he became the youngest captain of the under-21s in thirty years. In November of the same year, Zaïre-Emery scored on his senior debut for France, becoming the team's third-youngest debutant and second-youngest goalscorer.

== Early life ==
Warren Marie Jean-Pierre Zaïre-Emery was born on 8 March 2006 in Montreuil, Seine-Saint-Denis. His father, Franck Emery, was born in Aubervilliers, and also a footballer, having played with Red Star in Seine-Saint-Denis. His mother is of Martiniquais descent.

Zaïre-Emery started playing at Aubervilliers at the age of four, having to wait a year just to be old enough to take his first license there.

== Club career ==
=== Paris Saint-Germain ===
==== Youth career ====
Already a standout player for Aubervilliers, Zaïre-Emery was quickly scouted by Paris Saint-Germain (PSG), signing with the club from the capital in 2014. In their youth system, Zaïre-Emery always played in categories above his age, impressing his coaches at all levels.

During the 2021–22 season, as he had only turned 15, he was the youngest player of the under-19 squad. Despite his young age, Zaïre-Emery became a key player of the U19s, most notably in December 2021, when he was the standout performer of PSG in the UEFA Youth League: during the last group stage game, helping his team to a 3–2 home win against Club Brugge with a goal and an assist, narrowly qualifying PSG directly to the round of 16.

At the age of 15, Zaïre-Emery was called by Mauricio Pochettino to the first team that season. Attracting the attention of several other big European clubs while still yet to sign his first professional contract, he joined Jorge Mendes's agency in March 2022.

==== 2022–23: Debut season and breakthrough ====
In July 2022, Zaïre-Emery signed his first professional contract with PSG, a three-year deal until 30 June 2025. Under new coach Christophe Galtier, he made his senior debut in a 2–0 friendly win over Quevilly-Rouen, and was included in PSG's preseason tour in Japan, where he was in the starting lineup for a 3–0 win over Urawa Red Diamonds. On 6 August 2022, Zaïre-Emery made his official debut for PSG as a substitute in a 5–0 league win away to Clermont. His debut at the age of 16 years and 151 days made him the youngest player to appear in an official match for the club, a record which was previously held by El Chadaille Bitshiabu.

On 25 October, Zaïre-Emery made his UEFA Champions League debut as a substitute in a 7–2 home victory over Maccabi Haifa. This made him the youngest player to appear in the Champions League for PSG. On 6 January 2023, he made his first start in a 3–1 Coupe de France victory away to Châteauroux, becoming the youngest starter in the club's history. He became the club's youngest starter in Ligue 1 in a 1–0 defeat away to Rennes eight days later.

On 1 February, Zaïre-Emery scored his first senior goal, coming off the bench to cap off a 3–1 victory against Montpellier; in doing so he became PSG's youngest ever goalscorer, aged 16 years and 330 days. On 14 February, he became the youngest player to start a Champions League knockout game at the age of 16 years and 343 days in a 1–0 loss to Bayern Munich. At the end of the 2022–23 season, Zaïre-Emery won his first Ligue 1 title.

==== 2023–24: Establishment as a key player ====
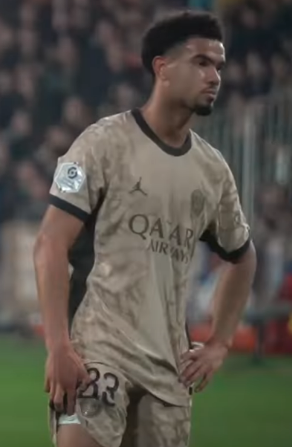
Zaïre-Emery with Paris Saint-Germain in 2024

On 26 August 2023, Zaïre-Emery recorded his first assist for PSG, a pass for Marco Asensio in a 3–1 win over Lens. It made him the youngest PSG player to record a Ligue 1 assist since Opta began analysing this data in 2006. On 4 October, Zaïre-Emery assisted Lucas Hernandez's header in a 4–1 Champions League defeat away to Newcastle United, making him the youngest French and PSG player to record an assist in the competition. Two weeks later, he registered two assists in a 3–0 Champions League victory over AC Milan, becoming the youngest player to reach three assists in the competition. Having won the player of the match award on the night, he also became the youngest player to make twenty starts for PSG.

On 29 October, Zaïre-Emery scored his first goal of the season, a "rocket" into the top corner from outside the box, in a 3–2 away victory over Brest. In the following game against Montpellier, he scored his first goal at the Parc des Princes in a 3–0 Parisian victory. On 13 December, he scored his first Champions League goal in a 1–1 away draw against Borussia Dortmund, which qualified his club to the knockout stages. At the age of 17 years and 280 days he became the youngest French goalscorer in Champions League history and PSG's youngest goalscorer in European competitions.

On 27 April 2024, prior to a home match against Le Havre, PSG announced that Zaïre-Emery had extended his contract with the club until 30 June 2029. In the match, he provided an assist for Bradley Barcola's goal, PSG's first in a 3–3 draw. The following day, Zaïre-Emery won his second Ligue 1 title with PSG thanks to Lyon's victory over Monaco. On 13 May, he was awarded the Ligue 1 Young Player of the Year award at the Trophées UNFP du football ceremony. He was also included in the Team of the Year. On 25 May, Zaïre-Emery started in the 2024 Coupe de France final, a 2–1 win for PSG over Lyon.

==== 2024–25: Continental treble ====
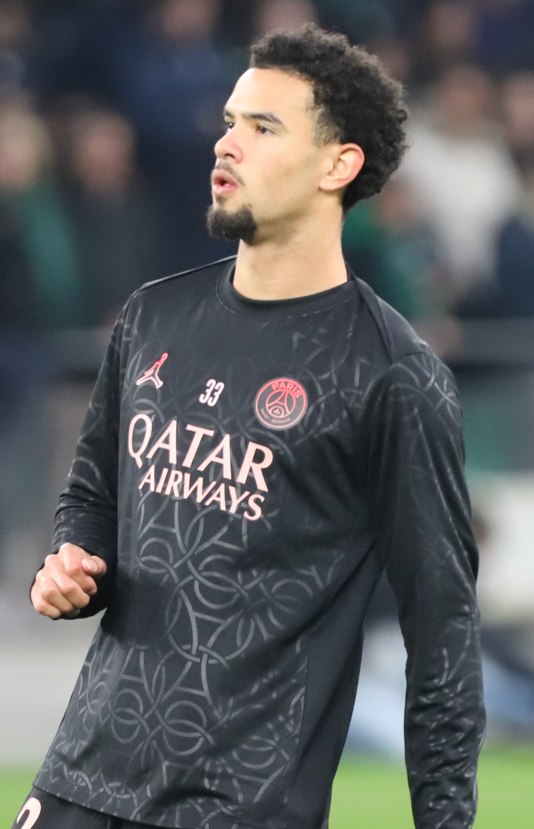
Zaïre-Emery with Paris Saint-Germain in 2025

On 16 August 2024, Zaïre-Emery started in the first match of the 2024–25 Ligue 1 season, a 4–1 victory for PSG over Le Havre. On 23 August, in PSG's first home game, he scored the fifth goal of a 6–0 win over Montpellier, his first of the season. After receiving a pass from Ousmane Dembélé, he nutmegged defender Boubakar Kouyaté before placing his shot to goalkeeper Benjamin Lecomte's left, a goal that was described by Le Parisien as "sumptuous". On 6 November, he scored in PSG's 2–1 defeat at home to Atlético Madrid in the Champions League.

On 18 January 2025, Zaïre-Emery started in a 2–1 victory away to Lens for his 100th match for PSG. He became the youngest player to achieve the feat, at the age of 18 years, 10 months, and 10 days, eclipsing Jean-Marc Pilorget's previous record. On 8 March 2025, on his 19th birthday, he wore the captain's armband in a 4–1 win over Rennes, becoming the second-youngest captain in PSG history after then-17-year-old Mamadou Sakho. On 5 April 2025, Zaïre-Emery started in the 1–0 win over Angers that secured PSG's record-extending thirteenth league title. He came on as a substitute in the 2025 UEFA Champions League final, a 5–0 win over Inter Milan that rounded off PSG's first continental treble.

==== 2025–26 season ====
On 13 August 2025, Zaïre-Emery started in the 2025 UEFA Super Cup, participating in PSG's 2–2 draw and 4–3 penalty shoot-out victory over Tottenham Hotspur. On 9 November, he scored his first goal of the season in a 3–2 win over Lyon, becoming the first player born in 2006 or later to score more than five Ligue 1 goals. In the 2025 FIFA Intercontinental Cup final, playing as a right-back during Achraf Hakimi's absence due to injury, Zaïre-Emery was described as one of Paris Saint-Germain's best performers in the match, an eventual victory on penalties over Flamengo.

== International career ==
=== Youth ===
In April 2022, he was selected with the France under-17 national team for the UEFA Under-17 Euro. With this 2005 generation, he was the only 2006-born player of the squad. France went on to win the tournament, with Zaïre-Emery scoring two goals.

In September 2023, Zaïre-Emery was called up to the France under-21s by newly appointed coach Thierry Henry. Henry chose to designate Zaïre-Emery as team captain for the matches against Denmark and Slovenia, making him the youngest captain of Les Espoirs in thirty years.

He and his teammate Bradley Barcola were not included for the 2024 Summer Olympics on home soil, as Paris Saint-Germain denied them permission to compete in the tournament.

=== Senior ===
On 9 November 2023, Zaïre-Emery received his first call-up to the senior France national team, for UEFA Euro 2024 qualifiers against Gibraltar and Greece. He became the youngest player to be called up for Les Bleus since Maurice Gastiger in 1914, and the third-youngest ever. He made his debut on 18 November against Gibraltar, scoring a goal in an eventual 14–0 win for France, the largest victory in the team's history. His goal made him the second-youngest scorer in France's history, only behind Gastiger. However, in the process of scoring, Zaïre-Emery was on the receiving end of a tackle by Gibraltarian defender Ethan Santos, who was shown a red card after review. Zaïre-Emery, who came off injured, was reported to have suffered a "serious ankle sprain" that was projected to keep him out of action until the end of 2023.

On 16 May 2024, Zaïre-Emery was selected by Didier Deschamps as one of the twenty-five players to represent France at UEFA Euro 2024. He went on to make no appearances in the tournament as France reached the semi-finals.

In October 2025, Zaïre-Emery was not called up by Deschamps and instead was demoted to the under-21s. After improvements in his performances the following month, he returned to the senior team in November 2025.

On 14 May 2026, Zaïre-Emery was selected in the 26-man squad for the 2026 FIFA World Cup.

== Style of play ==
Zaïre-Emery is a midfielder known for his physicality and technical skills. He is effective in both ball recovery and initiating play, contributing to the structure and balance of his team's midfield. Although most commonly used as a box-to-box or defensive midfielder by PSG, he is able to play in all positions in the midfield. He also has been successfully deployed as a right fullback notably in the absence of Achraf Hakimi during the 2025-26 season. Adept at reading the game, he is described as a player with a very mature personality on the pitch while still in his teenage years, able to take on his responsibilities while maintaining a calm and disciplined attitude. Zaïre-Emery has been praised for his passing, dribbling, and stamina.

== Personal life ==
At the "Paris for Good" gala event on 16 May 2024, it was revealed that Zaïre-Emery was in a relationship with PSG goalkeeper Océane Toussaint, the women's recipient of the 2022 Titi d'Or award. They had been previously pictured together at a Louis Vuitton event in January 2024.

== Career statistics ==
=== Club ===
As of match played 21 November 2026

Appearances and goals by club, season and competition
Club	Season	League			Coupe de France		Europe		Other		Total	
Club	Season	Division	Apps	Goals	Apps	Goals	Apps	Goals	Apps	Goals	Apps	Goals
Paris Saint-Germain	2022–23	Ligue 1	26	2	2	0	3 (Note: Appearances in UEFA Champions League)	0	0	0	31	2
Paris Saint-Germain	2023–24	Ligue 1	26	2	5	0	11	1	1 (Note: Appearance in Trophée des Champions)	0	43	3
Paris Saint-Germain	2024–25	Ligue 1	29	1	5	1	13	1	8 (Note: One appearance in Trophée des Champions, seven appearances in FIFA Club World Cup)	0	55	3
Paris Saint-Germain	2025–26	Ligue 1	32	3	2	0	17	0	3 (Note: One appearance in UEFA Super Cup, one appearance in FIFA Intercontinental Cup, one appearance in Trophée des Champions)	0	54	3
Paris Saint-Germain	2026–27	Ligue 1	11	0	0	0	2	0	2 (Note: One appearance in UEFA Super Cup, one appearance in Trophée des Champions)	0	15	0
Career total			124	8	14	1	46	2	13	0	198	11

=== International ===
As of match played 15 November 2026

Appearances and goals by national team and year
National team	Year	Apps	Goals
France	2023	1	1
France	2024	5	0
France	2025	3	0
France	2026	4	0
Total		14	1

As of match played 15 November 2026
Scores and results list France's goal tally first, score column indicates score after each Zaïre-Emery goal

List of international goals scored by Warren Zaïre-Emery
No.	Date	Venue	Cap	Opponent	Score	Result	Competition	Ref.
1	18 November 2023	Allianz Riviera, Nice, France	1	Gibraltar	3–0	14–0	UEFA Euro 2024 qualifying	

== Honours ==
Paris Saint-Germain

- Ligue 1: 2022–23, 2023–24, 2024–25, 2025–26
- Coupe de France: 2023–24, 2024–25
- Trophée des Champions: 2023, 2024, 2025
- UEFA Champions League: 2024–25, 2025–26
- UEFA Super Cup: 2025, 2026
- FIFA Intercontinental Cup: 2025
- FIFA Club World Cup runner-up: 2025

France U17

- UEFA European Under-17 Championship: 2022

France

- UEFA Nations League third place: 2024–25

Individual

- Titi d'Or: 2022
- Ligue 1 Young Player of the Year: 2023–24
- UNFP Ligue 1 Team of the Year: 2023–24
- IFFHS Men's World Youth (U20) Team: 2023
