= France v Azerbaijan (UEFA Euro 1996 qualifying) =

UEFA Euro 1996 qualifying Group 1
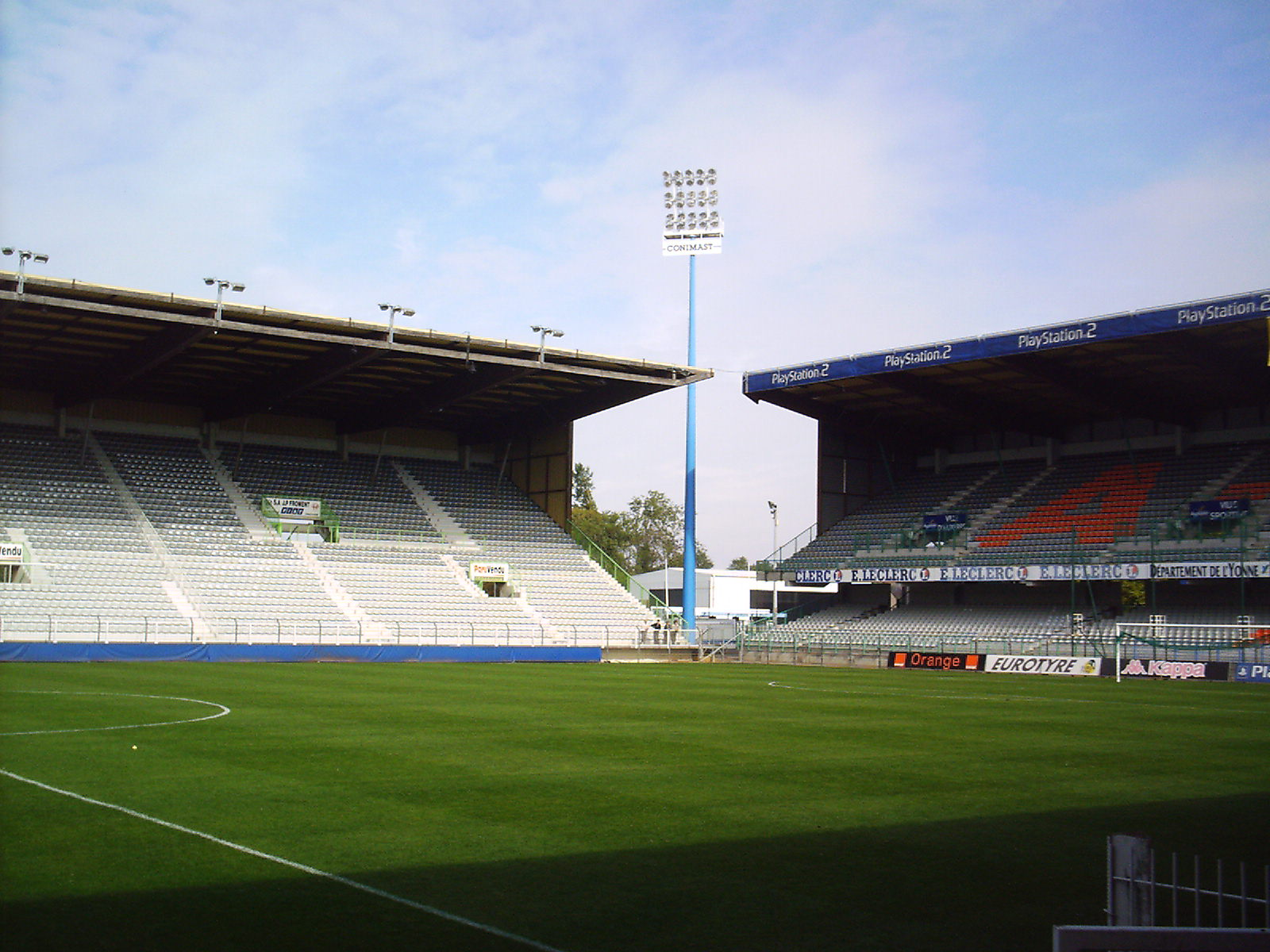
- Event: UEFA Euro 1996 qualifying
France	Azerbaijan
(France)	(Azerbaijan)
10	0
- Date: 6 September 1995
- Venue: Stade de l'Abbé-Deschamps, Auxerre, France
- Referee: Alfred Micallef (Malta)
- Attendance: 13,479

France v Azerbaijan, also known as the "Auxerre tragedy" (Azerbaijani: Oser faciəsi) in Azerbaijani media, was a football match belonging to the UEFA Euro 1996 qualifying that took place on 6 September 1995.

France won the game 10–0, and it went down as the largest victory in the history of the France national team until it was surpassed by a 14–0 win over Gibraltar in 2023. The match also became the biggest defeat of the Azerbaijan national team, a record that still stands today.

== Background ==
Team	Pld	W	D	L	GF	GA	GD	Pts
Romania	8	5	3	0	15	6	+9	18
Poland	8	3	3	2	13	8	+5	12
France	7	2	5	0	7	1	+6	11
Slovakia	8	3	2	3	10	15	−5	11
Israel	8	2	3	3	11	11	0	9
Azerbaijan	7	0	0	7	2	17	−15	0

This would be the 8th match for both teams in the first group of the UEFA Euro 1996 qualifying. While Azerbaijan already lost its chance to participate in the tournament, France was still fighting for a ticket. Prior to the game, France's biggest victory was 8–0, twice over Luxembourg (20 April 1913 and 17 December 1953) and against Iceland (2 June 1957). Azerbaijan had only been playing international football since 1992; prior to that, the country had been part of the Soviet Union. They had suffered its biggest defeat (0–5) in a friendly match against Malta on 19 April 1994.

Azerbaijan did not start a true striker for the match, instead utilising captain Shahin Diniyev in a rudimentary attacking role, while the French XI was almost at their full strength.

== Match ==
=== Details ===
6 September 1995
20:45

France	10–0	Azerbaijan
Desailly 14'; Djorkaeff 18', 78'; Guérin 35'; Pedros 49'; Leboeuf 53', 74'; Dugarry 66'; Zidane 72'; Cocard 90'	Report

Stade de l'Abbé-Deschamps, Auxerre, France
Attendance: 13,479
Referee: Alfred Micallef (Malta)

France	Azerbaijan

GK	1	Bernard Lama
RB	2	Jocelyn Angloma	(substituted off) 57'
CB	4	Marcel Desailly (c)
CB	5	Frank Leboeuf
LB	3	Bixente Lizarazu
CM	7	Didier Deschamps
CM	8	Vincent Guérin
RW	6	Youri Djorkaeff
AM	10	Zinedine Zidane
LW	11	Reynald Pedros	(substituted off) 65'
CF	9	Christophe Dugarry	(substituted off) 69'
Substitutes:
DF	12	Éric Di Meco
DF	13	Lilian Thuram	(substituted on) 57'
FW	14	David Ginola	(substituted on) 65'
MF	15	Christophe Cocard	(substituted on) 69'
GK	16	Bruno Martini
Manager:
Aimé Jacquet

GK	1	Elkhan Hasanov		(substituted off) 36'
RB	3	İqor Getman	(yellow card) 49'
CB	4	Tarlan Ahmadov
CB	5	Emin Ağayev
LB	6	Rasim Abushev
RM	2	Arif Asadov
CM	11	Vyacheslav Lychkin
CM	10	Mahmud Qurbanov		(substituted off) 46'
CM	7	Yunis Huseynov
LM	9	Vladislav Kadyrov		(substituted off) 74'
CF	8	Shahin Diniyev (c)
Substitutes:
MF	13	Fazil Parvarov
FW	14	Mushfig Huseynov		(substituted on) 74'
FW	15	Samir Alakbarov		(substituted on) 46'
GK	16	Nizami Sadiqov		(substituted on) 36'
MF	17	Bakhtiyar Musayev
Manager:
Aghasalim Mirjavadov

== Post-match ==
After the game, France overtook Poland to lie in second place with 14 points, while Azerbaijan remained rooted to the bottom with 8 losses. Head coach Aghasalim Mirjavadov resigned immediately after the defeat, citing the inability of the players, the low level of training and the opponents' strength as the reasons for the defeat.

Les Bleus would go on to finish second in their group and qualify for UEFA Euro 1996, where they reached the semi-finals. Nearly the same crop of players, including some notable names like Zinedine Zidane, Youri Djorkaeff and Bixente Lizarazu, would go on to win the 1998 FIFA World Cup on home soil.

In 2016, pastemagazine.com included the match in its list of Top 10 Biggest National Defeats.

=== Final table ===
Team	Pld	W	D	L	GF	GA	GD	Pts
Romania	8	5	3	0	15	6	+9	18
France	8	3	5	0	17	1	+16	14
Poland	8	3	3	2	13	8	+5	12
Slovakia	8	3	2	3	10	15	−5	11
Israel	8	2	3	3	11	11	0	9
Azerbaijan	8	0	0	8	2	27	−25	0

== See also ==
- UEFA Euro 1996 qualifying
- UEFA Euro 2024 qualifying
- France v Gibraltar (UEFA Euro 2024 qualifying)
