= Evan Ferguson =

Irish footballer (born 2004)

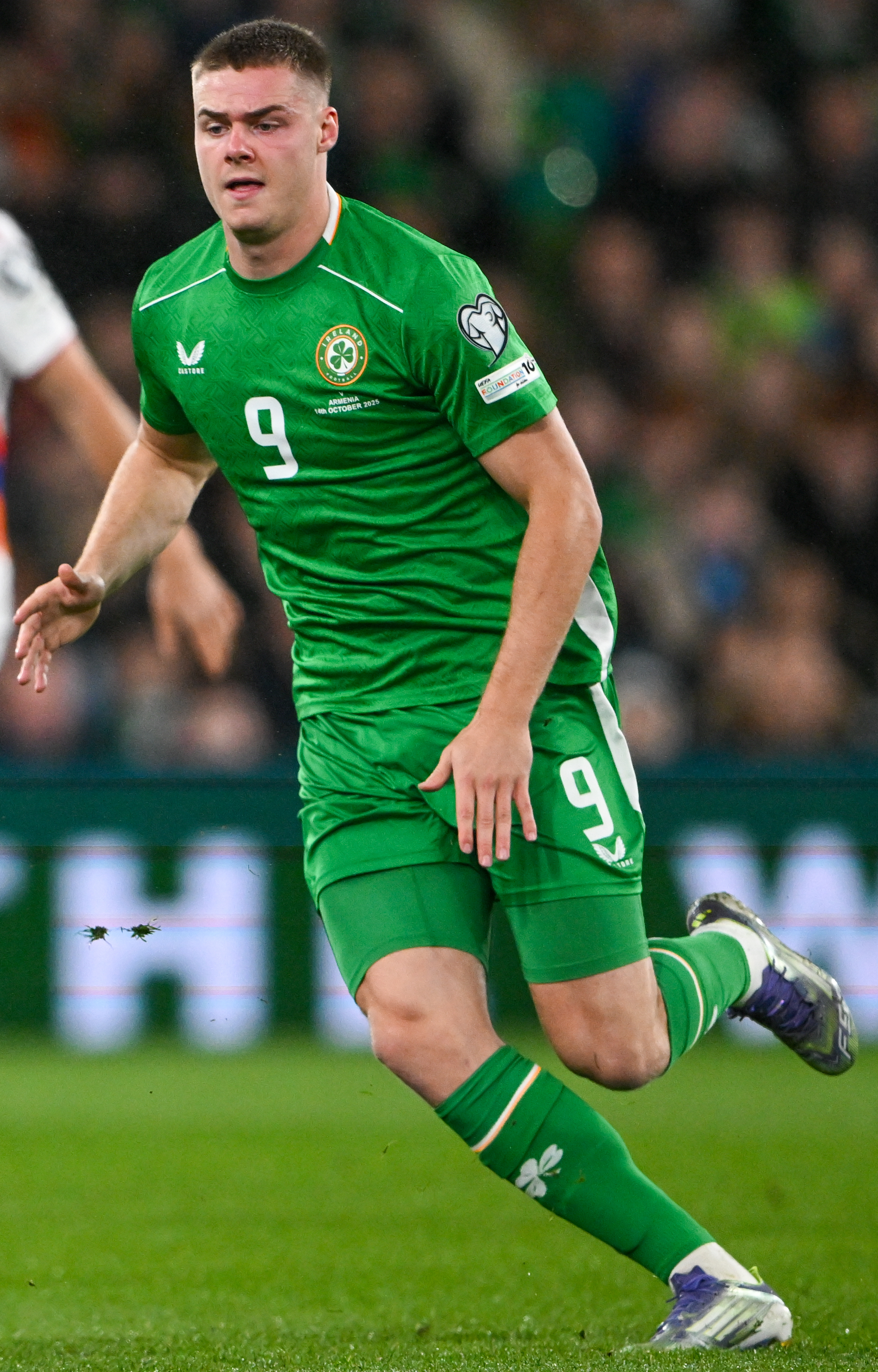
- Ferguson playing for Republic of Ireland in 2025

Personal information
- Full name: Evan Joe Ferguson
- Date of birth: 19 October 2004 (age 22)
- Place of birth: Drogheda, Ireland
- Height: 1.83 m (6 ft 0 in)
- Position: Striker

Team information
- Current team: Brighton & Hove Albion
- Number: 28

Youth career
- 2009–2017: St Kevin's Boys
- 2017–2019: Bohemians

Senior career*
Years	Team	Apps	(Gls)
2019–2021	Bohemians	3	(0)
2021–	Brighton & Hove Albion	60	(13)
2025	→ West Ham United (loan)	8	(0)
2025–2026	→ Roma (loan)	16	(3)

International career^{‡}
2018–2019	Republic of Ireland U15	4	(2)
2019–2020	Republic of Ireland U17	3	(3)
2021–2022	Republic of Ireland U21	10	(1)
2022–	Republic of Ireland	26	(8)
- * Club domestic league appearances and goals as of 21:21, 11 January 2026 (UTC) ‡ National team caps and goals as of 22:31, 14 October 2025 (UTC)

Evan Joe Ferguson (born 19 October 2004) is an Irish professional footballer who plays as a striker for Premier League club Brighton & Hove Albion and the Republic of Ireland national team.

== Club career ==
=== Early life ===
A native of Bettystown, County Meath, a village south of Drogheda, Ferguson is the son of former professional footballer Barry Ferguson who played for Coventry City, Colchester United, Hartlepool United, Northampton Town, Longford Town, Bohemians, Shamrock Rovers and Sporting Fingal during his playing career. His mother is English. He grew up supporting both Manchester United and Celtic. He attended Coláiste na hInse growing up.

Ferguson began playing with the prestigious Dublin schoolboy club St Kevin's Boys aged four, before moving on to the youth section of League of Ireland club Bohemians, where he would play in the National Underage Leagues. In December 2020, he scored in his last game at underage level for the club as his side won the League of Ireland U17 Division, beating rivals Shamrock Rovers 2–0 in the final.

=== Bohemians ===
Ferguson made his debut in senior football on 11 July 2019: a 1–1 draw with Chelsea in a friendly at Dalymount Park, aged just 14 at the time which made him the club's youngest ever player at senior level. His competitive debut in senior football came on 20 September 2019, replacing Luke Wade-Slater late on against Derry City at the Ryan McBride Brandywell Stadium. Ferguson's first goals at senior level came on 28 January 2020, scoring two goals in a 4–2 pre-season friendly win over Drogheda United. He would go on to make four competitive appearances in total over his two seasons at the club.

=== Brighton & Hove Albion ===
==== 2021–22 season ====
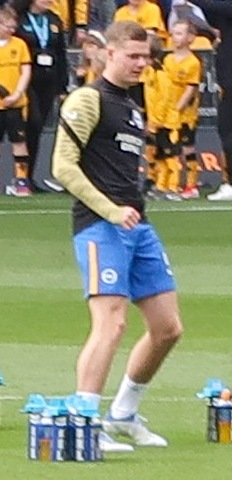
Ferguson in 2022.

In January 2021, he signed for the academy of Brighton & Hove Albion, who beat fellow Premier League club Liverpool to his signature. On 24 August 2021, he made his first team debut, replacing Enock Mwepu, in the 81st minute of a 2–0 win away against Championship side Cardiff City in the EFL Cup second round. On 6 September, he was nominated for the Premier League 2 Player of the Month award for August. He scored his first ever professional goal, scoring Brighton under-23s equaliser in an eventual 2–1 away win at League Two side Northampton in the EFL Trophy on 2 November. He won his club's goal of the month competition for November 2021 for his goal against Everton U23s at Goodison Park.

Ferguson's first involvement in a matchday squad in the Premier League came on 15 December 2021, when he was an unused substitute in the home defeat against Wolverhampton Wanderers. Ferguson made a second appearance of the season for the senior side on 8 January 2022, coming on as a 76th-minute substitute where he assisted Jakub Moder's equaliser in the eventual 2–1 – after extra-time – away victory over West Bromwich Albion of the Championship in the FA Cup third round. Four weeks later, Ferguson made another substitute appearance again coming in the FA Cup, this time away at Tottenham Hotspur on 5 February, in a 3–1 defeat for the Seagulls. On 19 February 2022, Ferguson made his Premier League debut for Brighton, coming on as a substitute in the 3–0 home loss against bottom side Burnley.

==== 2022–23 season ====
On 24 August 2022, Ferguson scored his first Albion goal, set up by fellow academy player Cameron Peupion, in the 90+4th minute of the 3–0 away win over League One side Forest Green Rovers in the EFL Cup second round. On 19 October 2022, on his 18th birthday, Ferguson signed his first long-term professional contract at Brighton, keeping him at the club until 2026. On 31 December, in the 4–2 home loss against Arsenal, he made his third Premier League appearance from the bench for Brighton where he scored his first career league goal. At 18 years old he became both Ireland and Brighton's youngest ever Premier League goalscorer. Three days later on 3 January 2023, Ferguson started his first Premier League match, scoring again in the 4–1 away victory over Everton. On 25 April, Ferguson committed his future to Brighton after signing a long-term contract until 2028. After a successful breakthrough season scoring 10 goals in 25 appearances Ferguson went on to win Brighton's Young Player of the Season at the end of season awards.

==== 2023–24 season ====
Ferguson opened his goal account for the 2023–24 season in the opening game on 12 August, after coming on as a substitute he netted a 95th minute effort to seal a 4–1 home win over Premier League newcomers Luton Town. On 2 September, Ferguson scored his first club career hat-trick against Newcastle United in a 3–1 home league win. Hence, he became the fourth player to achieve this feat at 18 years old, following Michael Owen, Robbie Fowler and Chris Bart-Williams. He also joined Cesc Fàbregas as the only two non-English players to reach 10 Premier League goal involvements while aged eighteen and under.

On 29 October 2023, Ferguson scored his 11th Premier League goal in the 26th minute of a 1–1 home draw against Fulham. The BBC reported that for his goal he had the space and composure to take a touch and calmly stroke the ball low past Fulham keeper Bernd Leno for the opening goal. On 10 November, he extended his contract until 2029. Ferguson brought his season tally to six against Nottingham Forest on 25 November, when he scored in the 26th minute from a Pascal Groß pass to make it 1–1, in a game that Brighton eventually won 3–2. Ferguson injured his ankle and had ligament surgery on the joint which ruled him out for the next six months.

==== 2024–25 season ====
After appearing for Ireland in early September 2024, Ferguson made his return to club football in Brighton's home goalless draw against Ipswich Town on 14 September. He scored his first Brighton goal of 2024 in a 2–2 draw against Wolverhampton Wanderers on 26 October.

==== West Ham United (loan) ====
On 3 February 2025, Ferguson signed for fellow Premier League club West Ham United on loan until the end of the season, rejoining his former coach Graham Potter. He made his debut for The Hammers on 15 February 2025, as a half-time substitute in a 1–0 home defeat to Brentford. He made just eight appearances during what was a disappointing loan spell, with Ferguson failing to score during his time with the club.

==== Roma (loan) ====
On 23 July 2025, Ferguson joined Serie A side Roma on loan with an option to purchase for a reported transfer fee of €40m. Ferguson made his competitive debut for the club during their first match in the Serie A against Bologna. He started for Roma and played 74 minutes in the game. On matchday 2, in an away game to Pisa, he assisted Matias Soulé to gain his first goal involvement for Roma with the match finishing 1–0 in Roma's favour. On 23 November Ferguson got his first goal for Roma in a 3–1 win away against Cremonese, it was the first goal Ferguson had scored in club football in 13 months and he was the first Irishman to score in Serie A since Liam Brady. On 11 March 2026, it was confirmed that Ferguson had undergone successful surgery to his ankle, which ruled him out for the rest of the season.

== International career ==
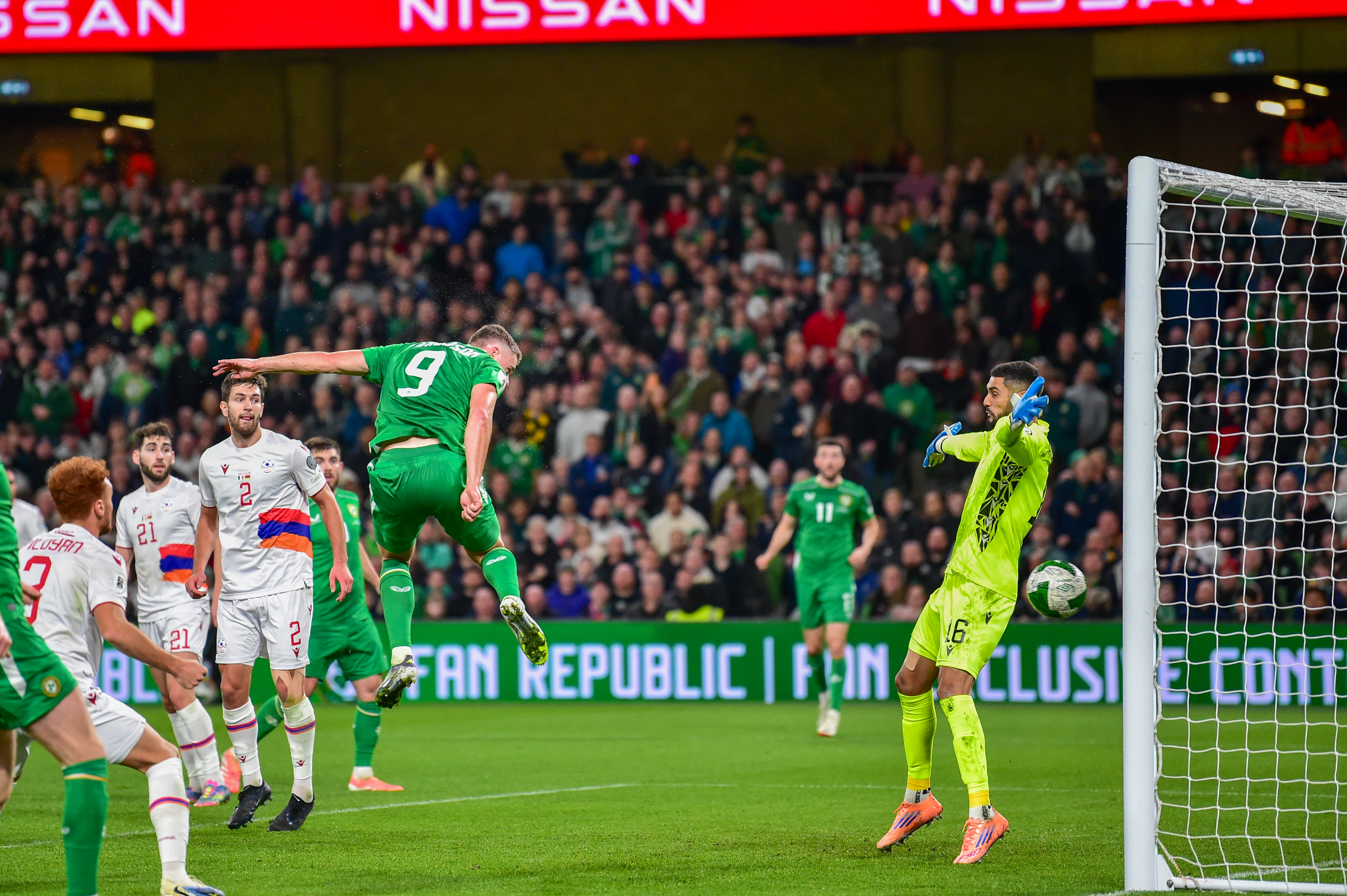
Ferguson scoring against Armenia in October 2025.

Ferguson has represented the Republic of Ireland at under-15, under-17 and under-21 youth level. On 27 August 2021, he was called up alongside Brighton teammate Andrew Moran to the Republic of Ireland U21 for the first time, for the 2023 UEFA European Under-21 Championship qualifiers against Bosnia and Herzegovina and Luxembourg. He made his U21 debut in a 2–0 win over Bosnia and Herzegovina in Zenica.

Ferguson was called up to the senior squad for the first time in November 2022 by manager Stephen Kenny, for friendlies against Norway and Malta, with the 18-year-old describing that he was "absolutely buzzing" with being selected. He made his senior debut against Norway on 17 November, coming on as a 89th-minute substitute for goalscorer Alan Browne in the 2–1 home defeat. Ferguson made his first start on 22 March 2023, against Latvia at the Aviva Stadium in Dublin in a friendly. He scored Ireland's second goal of the game on 17 minutes, from a knockback by Michael Obafemi. Ireland won the game 3–2, with Ferguson being replaced by Troy Parrott after 73 minutes.

In June 2023, Ferguson scored his first competitive goal for Ireland during a 3–0 victory over Gibraltar in the Aviva stadium in a Euro 2024 qualifier. In October 2023, Ferguson scored his second competitive goal against Gibraltar at the Estádio Algarve.

Ferguson headed home the solitary goal in the Republic's penultimate qualifying Nations League 1–0 win over Finland on 14 November 2024 at the Aviva Stadium, Ireland's first home win under new head coach Heimir Hallgrímsson, with the win keeping his side in the running for a third-place playoff spot.

On 23 March 2025, he scored the equaliser in a 2–1 win over Bulgaria in the second leg of Ireland's 2024–25 UEFA Nations League promotion/relegation play-offs, as they avoided relegation and kept their place in League B.

On 6 September 2025, Ferguson scored his country's first goal of the game as they came from 2–0 down to draw 2–2 at home to Hungary in the first game of their 2026 FIFA World Cup qualification campaign. 3 days later, he scored his second goal of the campaign, in a 2–1 defeat away to Armenia which massively damaged Ireland's hopes of qualification for the World Cup.

== Style of play ==
Ferguson has been described by Premier League record goalscorer Alan Shearer as looking "like the real deal. Left foot, right foot, headers, pace, aggression, intuition; there is no obvious weakness to his game."

== Career statistics ==
=== Club ===
As of match played 22 January 2026

Appearances and goals by club, season and competition
Club	Season	League			National cup (Note: Includes FAI Cup, FA Cup)		League cup (Note: Includes EFL Cup)		Europe		Other		Total	
Club	Season	Division	Apps	Goals	Apps	Goals	Apps	Goals	Apps	Goals	Apps	Goals	Apps	Goals
Bohemians	2019	LOI Premier Division	1	0	0	0	0	0	—		0	0	1	0
Bohemians	2020	LOI Premier Division	2	0	1	0	—		0	0	—		3	0
Bohemians	Total		3	0	1	0	0	0	0	0	0	0	4	0
Brighton & Hove Albion U21s	2021–22	—									2 (Note: Appearances in EFL Trophy)	1	2	1
Brighton & Hove Albion U21s	2022–23	—									3	1	3	1
Brighton & Hove Albion U21s	Total	—									5	2	5	2
Brighton & Hove Albion	2021–22	Premier League	1	0	2	0	1	0	—		—		4	0
Brighton & Hove Albion	2022–23	Premier League	19	6	4	3	2	1	—		—		25	10
Brighton & Hove Albion	2023–24	Premier League	27	6	2	0	0	0	7 (Note: Appearances in UEFA Europa League)	0	—		36	6
Brighton & Hove Albion	2024–25	Premier League	13	1	0	0	2	0	—		—		15	1
Brighton & Hove Albion	2026–27	Premier League	0	0	0	0	0	0	0	0	—		0	0
Brighton & Hove Albion	Total		60	13	8	4	5	1	7	0	—		80	17
West Ham United (loan)	2024–25	Premier League	8	0	—		—		—		—		8	0
Roma (loan)	2025–26	Serie A	16	3	0	0	—		6	2	—		22	5
Career total			87	16	9	3	5	1	13	2	5	2	119	24

=== International ===
As of match played 14 October 2025

Appearances and goals by national team and year
National team	Year	Apps	Goals
Republic of Ireland	2022	2	0
Republic of Ireland	2023	8	3
Republic of Ireland	2024	8	1
Republic of Ireland	2025	8	4
Total		26	8

Scores and results list the Republic of Ireland's goal tally first, score column indicates score after each Ferguson goal.

List of international goals scored by Evan Ferguson
No.	Date	Venue	Opponent	Score	Result	Competition
1	22 March 2023	Aviva Stadium, Dublin, Ireland	Latvia	2–0	3–2	Friendly
2	19 June 2023	Aviva Stadium, Dublin, Ireland	Gibraltar	2–0	3–0	UEFA Euro 2024 qualifying
3	16 October 2023	Estádio Algarve, Faro, Portugal	Gibraltar	1–0	4–0	UEFA Euro 2024 qualifying
4	14 November 2024	Aviva Stadium, Dublin, Ireland	Finland	1–0	1–0	2024–25 UEFA Nations League B
5	23 March 2025	Aviva Stadium, Dublin, Ireland	Bulgaria	1–1	2–1	2024–25 UEFA Nations League promotion/relegation play-offs
6	6 September 2025	Aviva Stadium, Dublin, Ireland	Hungary	1–2	2–2	2026 FIFA World Cup qualification
7	9 September 2025	Vazgen Sargsyan Republican Stadium, Yerevan, Armenia	Armenia	1–2	1–2	2026 FIFA World Cup qualification
8	14 October 2025	Aviva Stadium, Dublin, Ireland	Armenia	1–0	1–0	2026 FIFA World Cup qualification

== Honours ==
Individual

- FAI Young International Player of the Year: 2022, 2023
- Brighton & Hove Albion Young Player of the Season: 2022–23
