= Jonathan Clauss =

French footballer (born 1992)

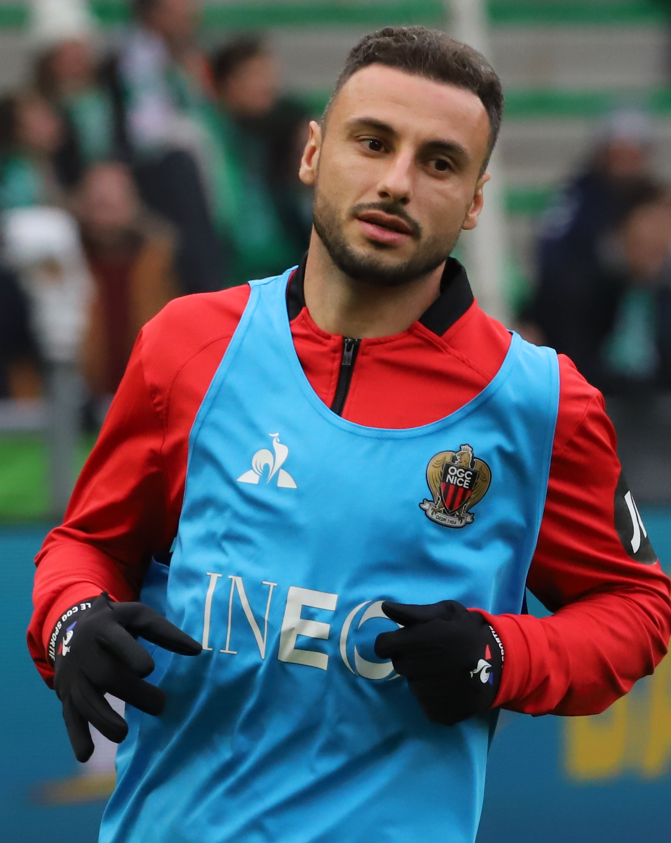
- Clauss with Nice in 2025

Personal information
- Full name: Jonathan Florent Clauss
- Date of birth: 25 September 1992 (age 34)
- Place of birth: Strasbourg, France
- Height: 1.78 m (5 ft 10 in)
- Position: Right-back

Team information
- Current team: Nice
- Number: 92

Youth career
- 1998–2000: FC Osthoffen
- 2000–2010: Strasbourg

Senior career*
Years	Team	Apps	(Gls)
2010–2013	ASPV Strasbourg		
2013–2015	RC Paris	62	(15)
2015–2016	Evian	24	(0)
2016–2017	Avranches B	2	(0)
2016–2017	Avranches	30	(1)
2017–2018	Quevilly-Rouen B	1	(0)
2017–2018	Quevilly-Rouen	29	(1)
2018–2020	Arminia Bielefeld	62	(8)
2020	Lens B	1	(0)
2020–2022	Lens	70	(8)
2022–2024	Marseille	61	(5)
2024–	Nice	65	(5)

International career^{‡}
2022–	France	14	(2)
- * Club domestic league appearances and goals as of 22:40, 18 October 2026 (UTC) ‡ National team caps and goals as of 23:03, 6 September 2024 (UTC)

Jonathan Florent Clauss (Alemannic German pronunciation: [ˈklaʊ̯s]; born 25 September 1992) is a French professional footballer who plays as a right-back for Ligue 1 club Nice and the France national team.

Clauss represented France at the UEFA Euro 2024.

== Early life ==
Jonathan Florent Clauss was born on 25 September 1992 in Strasbourg, Alsace.

== Club career ==
=== Early career ===
A long-term academy product of Strasbourg, Clauss spent years in the lower divisions of France and Germany before signing a contract with Quevilly-Rouen in the Ligue 2 for the 2017–18 season. He made his professional debut for the club in a 3–2 loss to Châteauroux on 8 September 2017, in which he assisted one of his side's goals.

=== Arminia Bielefeld ===
In August 2018, free agent Clauss joined 2. Bundesliga side Arminia Bielefeld after trialling with the side.

=== Lens ===
In May 2020, L'Équipe reported Clauss would be leaving Bielefeld upon expiration of his contract in the summer and return to France having agreed a three-year contract with Lens, newly promoted to Ligue 1. At the age of 28, he made the first top-flight appearance of his career. At the end of the 2020–21 season, he was included in the Ligue 1 Team of the Year by the Union Nationale des Footballeurs Professionnels (UNFP).

=== Marseille ===
On 20 July 2022, Clauss signed with fellow Ligue 1 side Marseille. The transfer fee to be paid to Lens was €9 million.

=== Nice ===
On 25 July 2024, Clauss signed for Nice for €5 million plus €1 million in potential bonuses.

== International career ==
In March 2022, at the age of 29, Clauss received his first call-up to the France national team when manager Didier Deschamps selected him for friendly matches against Ivory Coast and South Africa. He made his debut on 25 March in a 2–1 victory over the former side.

On 18 November 2023, Clauss scored his first goal with France in a 14–0 win over Gibraltar, the largest victory in the nation's history.

== Personal life ==
Clauss has been an outspoken critic of homophobic chants during football games. In May 2025, he said during an interview with L'Equipe that homosexual players hide because "people are selfish (...) they don't put in other people's shoes." Clauss also stated that on homophobia and other social issues like racism, he has always been "on the side of those who were not very popular in the (school) playground." He urged fellow players and fans to empathise with gay footballers, saying that "it is not cool for the people who suffer it."

In September 2025, during a match against Paris FC, referee Abdelatif Kherradji warned Nice fans that he would stop the game if the homophobic chants did not stop. Angry, Clauss confronted the fans who continued shouting anti-gay insults, later expressing that "there are things that shouldn't be heard in a football stadium, even in everyday society", again urging for protective environment for gay players.

== Career statistics ==
=== Club ===
As of match played 18 October 2026

Appearances and goals by club, season and competition
Club	Season	League			National cup (Note: Includes Coupe de France, DFB-Pokal)		Europe		Other		Total	
Club	Season	Division	Apps	Goals	Apps	Goals	Apps	Goals	Apps	Goals	Apps	Goals
SV Linx	2013–14	Verbandsliga Südbaden	31	5	—		—		—		31	5
SV Linx	2013–14	Oberliga Baden-Württemberg	2	1	—		—		—		2	1
SV Linx	2014–15	Verbandsliga Südbaden	29	9	—		—		—		29	9
SV Linx	Total		62	15	—		—		—		62	15
Raon-l'Étape	2015–16	CFA	24	0	1	0	—		—		25	0
Avranches	2016–17	Championnat National	30	1	5	1	—		—		35	2
Avranches B	2016–17	CFA 2	2	0	—		—		—		2	0
Quevilly-Rouen	2017–18	Ligue 2	29	1	0	0	—		—		29	1
Quevilly-Rouen B	2017–18	Championnat National 3	1	0	—		—		—		1	0
Arminia Bielefeld	2018–19	2. Bundesliga	28	3	1	0	—		—		29	3
Arminia Bielefeld	2019–20	2. Bundesliga	34	5	2	0	—		—		36	5
Arminia Bielefeld	Total		62	8	3	0	—		—		65	8
Lens B	2020–21	Championnat National 2	1	0	—		—		—		1	0
Lens	2020–21	Ligue 1	33	3	1	0	—		—		34	1
Lens	2021–22	Ligue 1	37	5	3	0	—		—		40	3
Lens	Total		70	8	4	0	—		—		74	4
Marseille	2022–23	Ligue 1	34	2	2	0	6 (Note: Appearances in UEFA Champions League)	0	—		42	2
Marseille	2023–24	Ligue 1	27	3	2	0	14 (Note: Two appearances in UEFA Champions League, twelve appearances and two goals in UEFA Europa League)	2	—		43	5
Marseille	Total		61	5	4	0	20	2	—		85	7
Nice	2024–25	Ligue 1	28	3	3	0	7 (Note: Appearances in UEFA Europa League)	0	—		38	3
Nice	2025–26	Ligue 1	30	1	6	0	8 (Note: Two appearances in UEFA Champions League, six appearances in UEFA Europa League)	0	2 (Note: Appearances in Ligue 1 relegation/promotion play-offs)	1	46	2
Nice	2026–27	Ligue 1	7	1	0	0	—		—		7	1
Nice	Total		65	5	9	0	15	0	2	1	91	6
Career total			407	43	26	1	35	2	2	1	470	44

=== International ===
As of match played 6 September 2024

Appearances and goals by national team and year
National team	Year	Apps	Goals
France	2022	6	0
France	2023	4	1
France	2024	4	1
Total		14	2

Scores and results list France's goal tally first, score column indicates score after each Clauss goal

List of international goals scored by Jonathan Clauss
No.	Date	Venue	Cap	Opponent	Score	Result	Competition
1	18 November 2023	Allianz Riviera, Nice, France	9	Gibraltar	5–0	14–0	UEFA Euro 2024 qualifying
2	5 June 2024	Stade Saint-Symphorien, Longeville-lès-Metz, France	13	Luxembourg	2–0	3–0	Friendly

== Honours ==
Arminia Bielefeld

- 2. Bundesliga: 2019–20

Nice

- Coupe de France runner-up: 2025–26

Individual

- Ligue 1 Team of the Year: 2020–21, 2021–22
