= 2026 FIFA World Cup qualification – UEFA Group F =

Association football tournament group

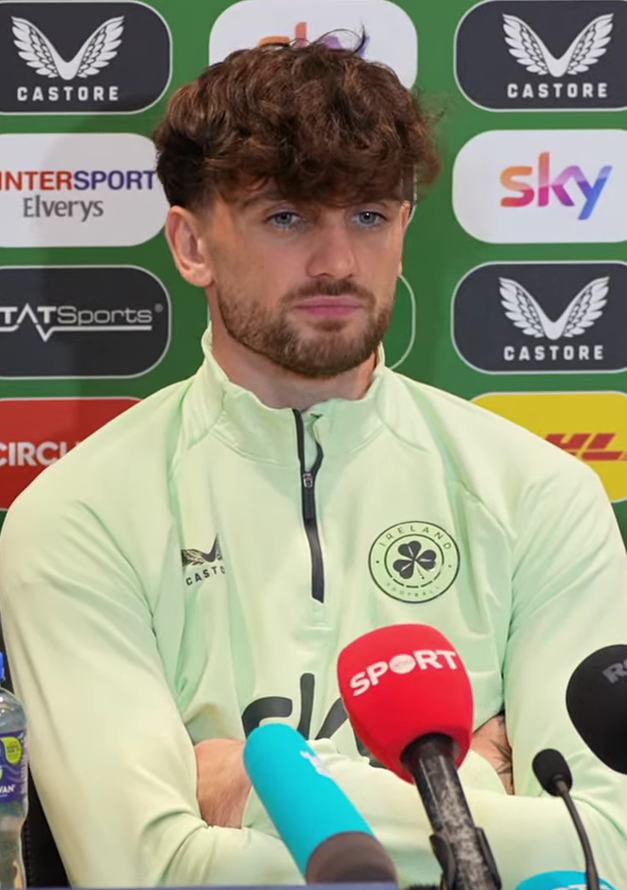
Troy Parrott, joint-top goal scorer (pictured in 2024)

The 2026 FIFA World Cup qualification UEFA Group F was one of the twelve UEFA groups in the World Cup qualification tournament to decide which teams would qualify for the 2026 FIFA World Cup final tournament in Canada, Mexico and the United States. Group F consisted of four teams: Armenia, Hungary, Portugal and the Republic of Ireland. The teams played against each other home-and-away in a round-robin format from September to November 2025.

The group winners, Portugal, qualified directly for the World Cup finals, while the runners-up, the Republic of Ireland, advanced to the second round (play-offs).

== Standings ==
Pos	Team	Pld	W	D	L	GF	GA	GD	Pts	Qualification	(Portugal national football team)	(Republic of Ireland national football team)	(Hungary national football team)	(Armenia national football team)
1	Portugal	6	4	1	1	20	7	+13	13	Qualified for the 2026 FIFA World Cup	—	1–0	2–2	9–1
2	Republic of Ireland	6	3	1	2	9	7	+2	10	Advanced to play-offs	2–0	—	2–2	1–0
3	Hungary	6	2	2	2	11	10	+1	8		2–3	2–3	—	2–0
4	Armenia	6	1	0	5	3	19	−16	3		0–5	2–1	0–1	—

Source: FIFA, UEFA
Rules for classification: Tiebreakers

== Matches ==
The fixture list was confirmed by UEFA on 13 December 2024 following the draw. Times are CET/CEST, (Note: CEST (UTC+2) for matches until 26 October 2025 (matchdays 1–4), and CET (UTC+1) for matches thereafter (matchdays 5–6).) as listed by UEFA (local times, if different, are in parentheses).

6 September 2025
18:00 (20:00 UTC+4)

Armenia	0–5	Portugal
	Report (FIFA); Report (UEFA)	Félix 10', 61'; Ronaldo 21', 46'; Cancelo 32'

Vazgen Sargsyan Republican Stadium, Yerevan
Attendance: 14,403
Referee: Anthony Taylor (England)
6 September 2025
20:45 (19:45 UTC+1)

Republic of Ireland	2–2	Hungary
Ferguson 49'; Idah 90+3'	Report (FIFA); Report (UEFA)	Varga 2'; Sallai 15'

Aviva Stadium, Dublin
Attendance: 51,137
Referee: Harm Osmers (Germany)

9 September 2025
18:00 (20:00 UTC+4)

Armenia	2–1	Republic of Ireland
Spertsyan 45+1' (pen.); Ranos 51'	Report (FIFA); Report (UEFA)	Ferguson 57'

Vazgen Sargsyan Republican Stadium, Yerevan
Attendance: 13,144
Referee: Goga Kikacheishvili (Georgia)
9 September 2025
20:45

Hungary	2–3	Portugal
Varga 21', 84'	Report (FIFA); Report (UEFA)	B. Silva 36'; Ronaldo 58' (pen.); Cancelo 86'

Puskás Aréna, Budapest
Attendance: 61,473
Referee: Erik Lambrechts (Belgium)

11 October 2025
18:00

Hungary	2–0	Armenia
Lukács 56'; Gruber 90+4'	Report (FIFA); Report (UEFA)

Puskás Aréna, Budapest
Attendance: 57,285
Referee: Chris Kavanagh (England)
11 October 2025
20:45 (19:45 UTC+1)

Portugal	1–0	Republic of Ireland
R. Neves 90+1'	Report (FIFA); Report (UEFA)

Estádio José Alvalade, Lisbon
Attendance: 48,821
Referee: Ivan Kružliak (Slovakia)

14 October 2025
20:45 (19:45 UTC+1)

Republic of Ireland	1–0	Armenia
Ferguson 70'	Report (FIFA); Report (UEFA)

Aviva Stadium, Dublin
Attendance: 42,292
Referee: Benoît Bastien (France)
14 October 2025
20:45 (19:45 UTC+1)

Portugal	2–2	Hungary
Ronaldo 22', 45+3'	Report (FIFA); Report (UEFA)	Szalai 8'; Szoboszlai 90+1'

Estádio José Alvalade, Lisbon
Attendance: 47,854
Referee: Srđan Jovanović (Serbia)

13 November 2025
18:00 (21:00 UTC+4)

Armenia	0–1	Hungary
	Report (FIFA); Report (UEFA)	Varga 33'

Vazgen Sargsyan Republican Stadium, Yerevan
Attendance: 14,247
Referee: José María Sánchez Martínez (Spain)
13 November 2025
20:45 (19:45 UTC+0)

Republic of Ireland	2–0	Portugal
Parrott 17', 45'	Report (FIFA); Report (UEFA)

Aviva Stadium, Dublin
Attendance: 50,717
Referee: Glenn Nyberg (Sweden)

16 November 2025
15:00

Hungary	2–3	Republic of Ireland
Lukács 3'; Varga 37'	Report (FIFA); Report (UEFA)	Parrott 15' (pen.), 80', 90+6'

Puskás Aréna, Budapest
Attendance: 59,411
Referee: Espen Eskås (Norway)
16 November 2025
15:00 (14:00 UTC+0)

Portugal	9–1	Armenia
Veiga 7'; Ramos 28'; J. Neves 30', 41', 81'; Fernandes 45+3' (pen.), 51', 72' (pen.); Conceição 90+2'	Report (FIFA); Report (UEFA)	Spertsyan 18'

Estádio do Dragão, Porto
Attendance: 46,702
Referee: Irfan Peljto (Bosnia and Herzegovina)

== Goalscorers ==
There were 43 goals scored in 12 matches, for an average of 3.58 goals per match.

5 goals

- (Hungary national football team) Barnabás Varga
- (Portugal national football team) Cristiano Ronaldo
- (Republic of Ireland national football team) Troy Parrott

3 goals

- (Portugal national football team) Bruno Fernandes
- (Portugal national football team) João Neves
- (Republic of Ireland national football team) Evan Ferguson

2 goals

- (Armenia national football team) Eduard Spertsyan
- (Hungary national football team) Dániel Lukács
- (Portugal national football team) João Cancelo
- (Portugal national football team) João Félix

1 goal

- (Armenia national football team) Grant-Leon Ranos
- (Hungary national football team) Zsombor Gruber
- (Hungary national football team) Roland Sallai
- (Hungary national football team) Attila Szalai
- (Hungary national football team) Dominik Szoboszlai
- (Portugal national football team) Francisco Conceição
- (Portugal national football team) Rúben Neves
- (Portugal national football team) Gonçalo Ramos
- (Portugal national football team) Bernardo Silva
- (Portugal national football team) Renato Veiga
- (Republic of Ireland national football team) Adam Idah

== Discipline ==
A player or team official was automatically suspended for the next match for the following offences:

- Receiving a red card (red card suspensions could be extended for serious offences)
- Receiving two yellow cards in two different matches (yellow card suspensions were carried forward to the play-offs, but not the finals or any other future international matches)

The following suspensions were served during the qualifying matches:

Team	Player	Offence(s)	Suspended for match(es)
Hungary	Roland Sallai	(red card) vs Republic of Ireland (6 September 2025)	vs Portugal (9 September 2025) vs Armenia (11 October 2025)
Hungary	Barnabás Varga	(yellow card) vs Republic of Ireland (6 September 2025); (yellow card) vs Portugal (9 September 2025)	vs Armenia (11 October 2025)
Republic of Ireland	Josh Cullen	(yellow card) vs Hungary (6 September 2025); (yellow card) vs Portugal (11 October 2025)	vs Armenia (14 October 2025)
Republic of Ireland	Ryan Manning	(yellow card) vs Portugal (11 October 2025); (yellow card) vs Armenia (14 October 2025)	vs Portugal (13 November 2025)
Republic of Ireland	Jayson Molumby	(yellow card) vs Portugal (11 October 2025); (yellow card) vs Armenia (14 October 2025)	vs Portugal (13 November 2025)
Armenia	Tigran Barseghyan	(red card) vs Republic of Ireland (14 October 2025)	vs Hungary (13 November 2025) vs Portugal (16 November 2025); Last match of suspension to be served outside tournament
Portugal	Bruno Fernandes	(yellow card) vs Republic of Ireland (11 October 2025); (yellow card) vs Hungary (14 October 2025)	vs Republic of Ireland (13 November 2025)
Portugal	Cristiano Ronaldo	(red card) vs Republic of Ireland (13 November 2025)	vs Armenia (16 November 2025)
