= Adam Idah =

Irish footballer (born 2001)

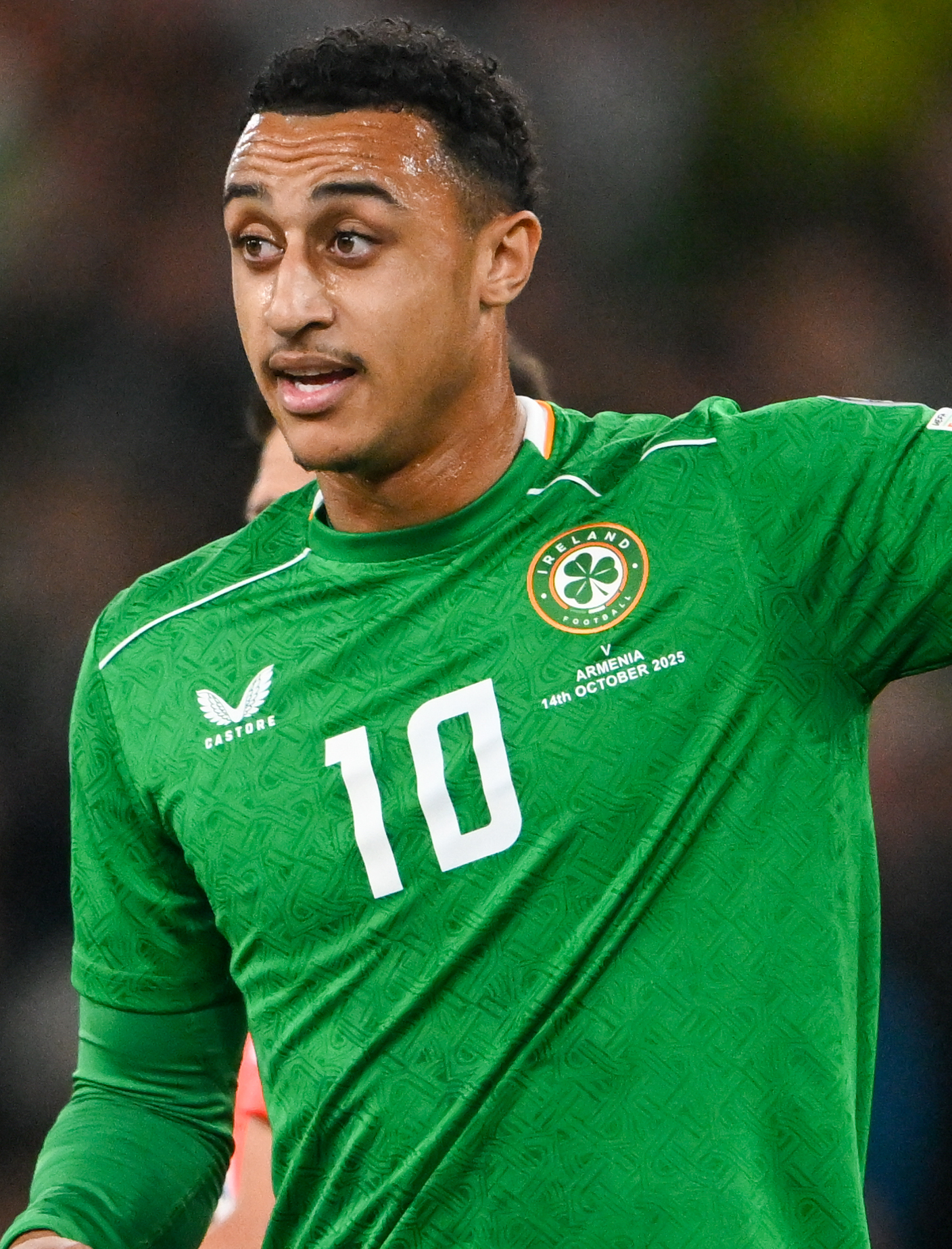
- Idah with the Republic of Ireland in 2025

Personal information
- Full name: Adam Uche Idah
- Date of birth: 11 February 2001 (age 25)
- Place of birth: Cork, Ireland
- Height: 1.90 m (6 ft 3 in)
- Position: Forward

Team information
- Current team: Swansea City
- Number: 33

Youth career
- 2007–2017: College Corinthians
- 2017–2019: Norwich City

Senior career*
| Years | Team | Apps | (Gls) |
| 2019–2024 | Norwich City | 100 | (12) |
| 2024 | → Celtic (loan) | 15 | (8) |
| 2024–2025 | Celtic | 37 | (13) |
| 2025– | Swansea City | 37 | (10) |

International career^{‡}
| 2016 | Republic of Ireland U16 | 2 | (0) |
| 2016–2018 | Republic of Ireland U17 | 22 | (14) |
| 2017–2018 | Republic of Ireland U18 | 5 | (2) |
| 2018 | Republic of Ireland U19 | 5 | (2) |
| 2019 | Republic of Ireland U21 | 12 | (5) |
| 2020– | Republic of Ireland | 46 | (7) |
- * Club domestic league appearances and goals as of 23:42, 31 October 2026 (UTC) ‡ National team caps and goals as of 21:44, 17 November 2026 (UTC)

Adam Uche Idah (/ˈiːdə/ EE-dah; born 11 February 2001) is an Irish professional footballer who plays as a forward for EFL Championship club Swansea City and the Republic of Ireland national team.

== Early career ==
Born in Cork to a Nigerian father and an Irish mother, Idah attended Douglas Community School. He started playing football with College Corinthians in 2007 at the age of six. He stayed with the Corinthians for ten years progressing through the youth levels before joining Norwich City as an academy scholar in 2017. In his first season at Norwich Idah played in the Professional Development League in Norwich's Premier League Under-18 team, scoring nine goals in 15 games. He completed a 10-minute hat-trick against Barnsley in the FA Youth Cup before scoring another hat-trick against Tottenham Hotspur in the U18 league. At the end of the season Idah won both the Norwich Under-18 player of the season and the academy player of the year awards.

During his second season at Norwich, Idah was productive in the youth team. He played in the club's under-23 team in Premier League 2, scoring 12 goals in 19 games. At the end of the season Idah was one of the eight nominations for Premier League 2 player of the season. On 4 July 2019, he signed his first professional contract with the club, signing a contract until 2023. In the 2019 pre-season, Idah trained with the first team, and was chosen to be part of Norwich's squad on their pre-season tour to Germany. In the first game of the tour he came on as a substitute in the 2–2 draw with Arminia Bielefeld, starting his first senior game for Norwich three days later in the friendly against Bonner SC, scoring two goals. Idah again featured in Norwich's final game of the tour, coming on as a substitute against Schalke 04.

== Club career ==
=== Norwich City ===
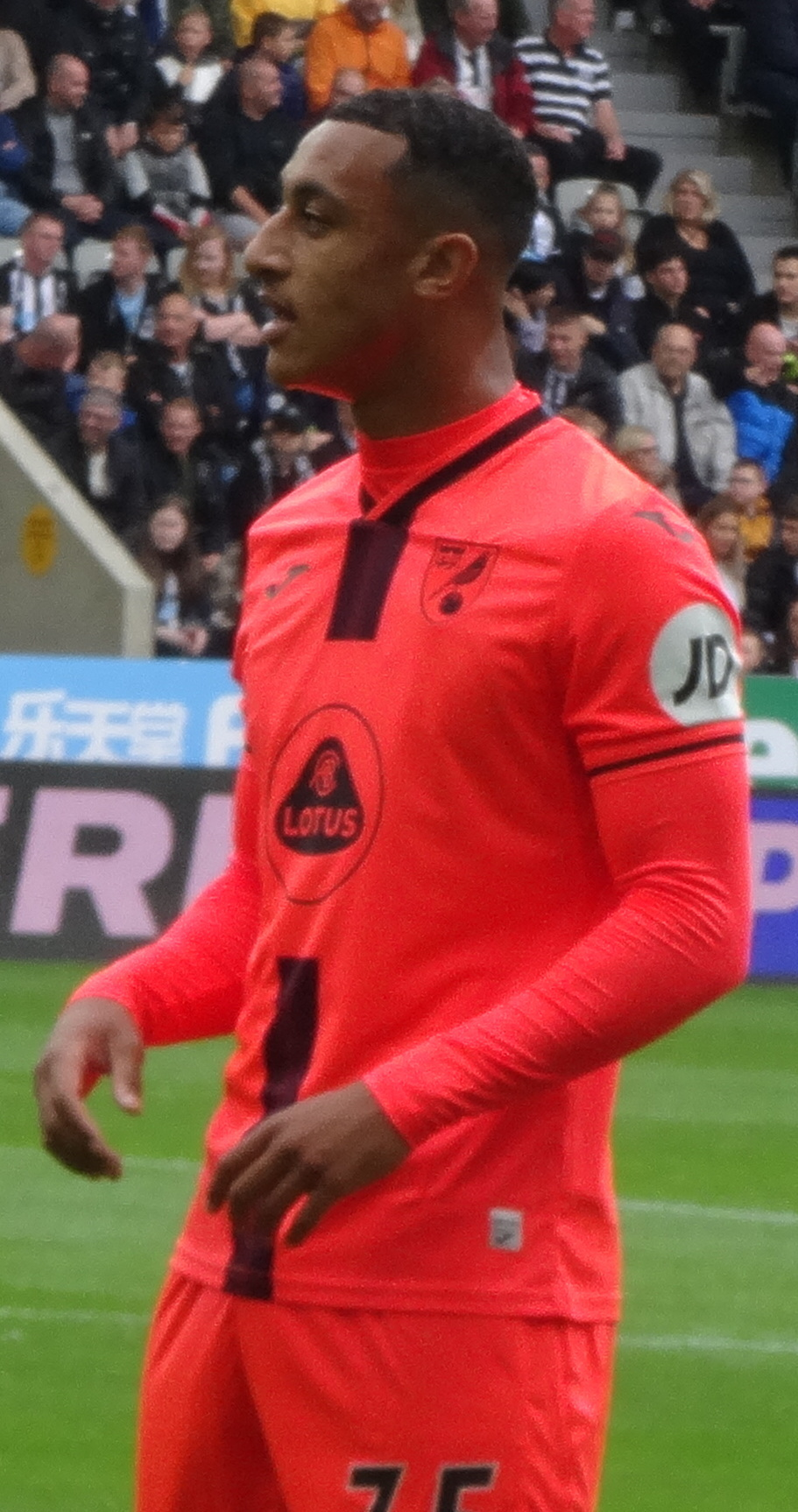
Idah playing for Norwich City in the 2021–22 season

Idah made his first senior appearance on 27 August 2019, playing the full 90 minutes as Norwich lost 1–0 at Crawley Town in the EFL Cup. He made his Premier League debut as a substitute against Crystal Palace on 1 January 2020 before starting Norwich's 2019–20 FA Cup third round match at Preston North End on 4 January, making his FA Cup debut. He scored his first professional hat-trick in the match, his third senior appearance for Norwich. He scored 3 league goals in 17 appearances on the way to his team's 2020–21 EFL Championship title win. On 15 January 2022, Idah scored his first Premier League goal for Norwich City in a 2–1 win against Everton in what was his first start for Norwich City in the Premier League and his first start at Carrow Road.

=== Celtic ===
Idah moved on loan to Celtic on 1 February 2024. He scored two penalties against Hibernian at Easter Road. He also scored the winning goal in the 2024 Scottish Cup final at Hampden Park against Rangers, sealing the League and Cup double.

On 14 August 2024, Idah returned to Celtic on a permanent transfer, signing a five-year contract. He was instrumental in Celtic's final two UEFA Champions League league stage matches against Young Boys and Aston Villa, setting up Celtic's winning goal in the former and scoring twice in the latter.

=== Swansea City ===
On 1 September 2025, Idah joined Swansea City of the EFL Championship on a five-year contract in a deal believed to be £6 million. His first goal would come on 4 October 2025, scoring a penalty in a 3–1 loss against Leicester City. On 19 December 2025, Idah took advantage of an error by Wrexham goalkeeper Arthur Okonkwo to score a stoppage time winner in the first meeting between the two Welsh clubs in 22 years. Shortly after this, Idah suffered a hamstring injury which kept him out for an extended period. He returned on 3 April 2026 and came from the bench with Swansea 3–1 down away to Sheffield United. He scored one and set up Eom Ji-sung for the equaliser in a 3–3 draw. On 2 May 2026, Idah came off the bench to score twice against Charlton Athletic in the final game of the season, sealing an 11th-placed finish.

== International career ==
Idah was a youth international for Ireland. Following his hat-trick for Norwich City against Preston North End on 4 January 2020, Republic of Ireland manager Mick McCarthy hinted that Idah may soon earn a full cap, commenting "He might have just got himself one", while working as a pundit for BT Sport's coverage of the match. On 24 August 2020, Idah was named in the Republic of Ireland senior squad for the first time for the UEFA Nations League games against Bulgaria and Finland, in what was his manager at under 21 level, Stephen Kenny's first squad as senior manager.

On 3 September 2020, on his first call-up for the senior team, he made his debut in a 1–1 draw away to Bulgaria in the 2020–21 UEFA Nations League. On 19 June 2023, he scored his first goal for Ireland in a 3–0 win against Gibraltar in a UEFA Euro 2024 qualifier.

On 10 September 2023, he scored the opener for Ireland in an eventual 2–1 defeat to Netherlands in a UEFA Euro 2024 qualifier. On 6 September 2025, Idah scored a last-minute equaliser against Hungary to help keep Ireland in contention for 2026 FIFA World Cup qualification. In the UEFA Playoffs later in the campaign, Idah took and scored a penalty in a shootout against Czechia, but Ireland ultimately lost.

== Career statistics ==
=== Club ===
As of match played 10 October 2026

Appearances and goals by club, season and competition
| Club | Season | League | | | National cup (Note: Includes FA Cup and Scottish Cup) | | League cup (Note: Includes EFL Cup and Scottish League Cup) | | Europe (Note: Includes UEFA Champions League) | | Total | |
| Club | Season | Division | Apps | Goals | Apps | Goals | Apps | Goals | Apps | Goals | Apps | Goals |
|---|---|---|---|---|---|---|---|---|---|---|---|---|
| Norwich City | 2019–20 | Premier League | 12 | 0 | 3 | 3 | 1 | 0 | — | | 16 | 3 |
| Norwich City | 2020–21 | Championship | 17 | 3 | 0 | 0 | 0 | 0 | — | | 17 | 3 |
| Norwich City | 2021–22 | Premier League | 17 | 1 | 2 | 0 | 2 | 0 | — | | 21 | 1 |
| Norwich City | 2022–23 | Championship | 25 | 2 | 1 | 0 | 1 | 1 | — | | 27 | 3 |
| Norwich City | 2023–24 | Championship | 28 | 6 | 3 | 1 | 3 | 0 | — | | 34 | 7 |
| Norwich City | 2024–25 | Championship | 1 | 0 | — | | 0 | 0 | — | | 1 | 0 |
| Norwich City | Total | | 100 | 12 | 9 | 4 | 7 | 1 | — | | 116 | 17 |
| Celtic (loan) | 2023–24 | Scottish Premiership | 15 | 8 | 4 | 1 | — | | — | | 19 | 9 |
| Celtic | 2024–25 | Scottish Premiership | 35 | 13 | 4 | 2 | 4 | 2 | 10 | 3 | 53 | 20 |
| Celtic | 2025–26 | Scottish Premiership | 2 | 0 | — | | 0 | 0 | 2 | 0 | 4 | 0 |
| Celtic | Total | | 52 | 21 | 8 | 3 | 4 | 2 | 12 | 3 | 76 | 29 |
| Swansea City | 2025–26 | Championship | 25 | 6 | 0 | 0 | 2 | 0 | — | | 27 | 6 |
| Swansea City | 2026–27 | Championship | 9 | 4 | 0 | 0 | 1 | 0 | — | | 10 | 4 |
| Swansea City | Total | | 34 | 10 | 0 | 0 | 3 | 0 | — | | 37 | 10 |
| Career total | | | 185 | 43 | 17 | 7 | 13 | 3 | 10 | 3 | 227 | 56 |

=== International ===
As of match played 17 November 2026

Appearances and goals by national team and year
| National team | Year | Apps | Goals |
|---|---|---|---|
| Republic of Ireland | 2020 | 5 | 0 |
| Republic of Ireland | 2021 | 8 | 0 |
| Republic of Ireland | 2022 | 0 | 0 |
| Republic of Ireland | 2023 | 9 | 3 |
| Republic of Ireland | 2024 | 7 | 1 |
| Republic of Ireland | 2025 | 8 | 2 |
| Republic of Ireland | 2026 | 9 | 1 |
| Total | | 46 | 7 |

Scores and results list the Republic of Ireland's goal tally first.

List of international goals scored by Adam Idah
| No. | Date | Venue | Opponent | Score | Result | Competition |
|---|---|---|---|---|---|---|
| 1 | 19 June 2023 | Aviva Stadium, Dublin, Ireland | Gibraltar | 3–0 | 3–0 | UEFA Euro 2024 qualifying |
| 2 | 10 September 2023 | Aviva Stadium, Dublin, Ireland | Netherlands | 1–0 | 1–2 | UEFA Euro 2024 qualifying |
| 3 | 21 November 2023 | Aviva Stadium, Dublin, Ireland | New Zealand | 1–0 | 1–1 | Friendly |
| 4 | 4 June 2024 | Aviva Stadium, Dublin, Ireland | Hungary | 1–0 | 2–1 | Friendly |
| 5 | 23 March 2025 | Aviva Stadium, Dublin, Ireland | Bulgaria | 2–1 | 2–1 | UEFA Nations League relegation playoff |
| 6 | 6 September 2025 | Aviva Stadium, Dublin, Ireland | Hungary | 2–2 | 2–2 | 2026 FIFA World Cup qualification |
| 7 | 27 September 2026 | Nagyerdei Stadion, Debrecen, Hungary | Israel | 2–0 | 3–0 | UEFA Nations League |

== Honours ==
Norwich City

- EFL Championship: 2020–21

Celtic

- Scottish Premiership: 2023–24, 2024–25
- Scottish Cup: 2023–24
- Scottish League Cup: 2024–25
