= Mikey Johnston =

Irish footballer (born 1999)

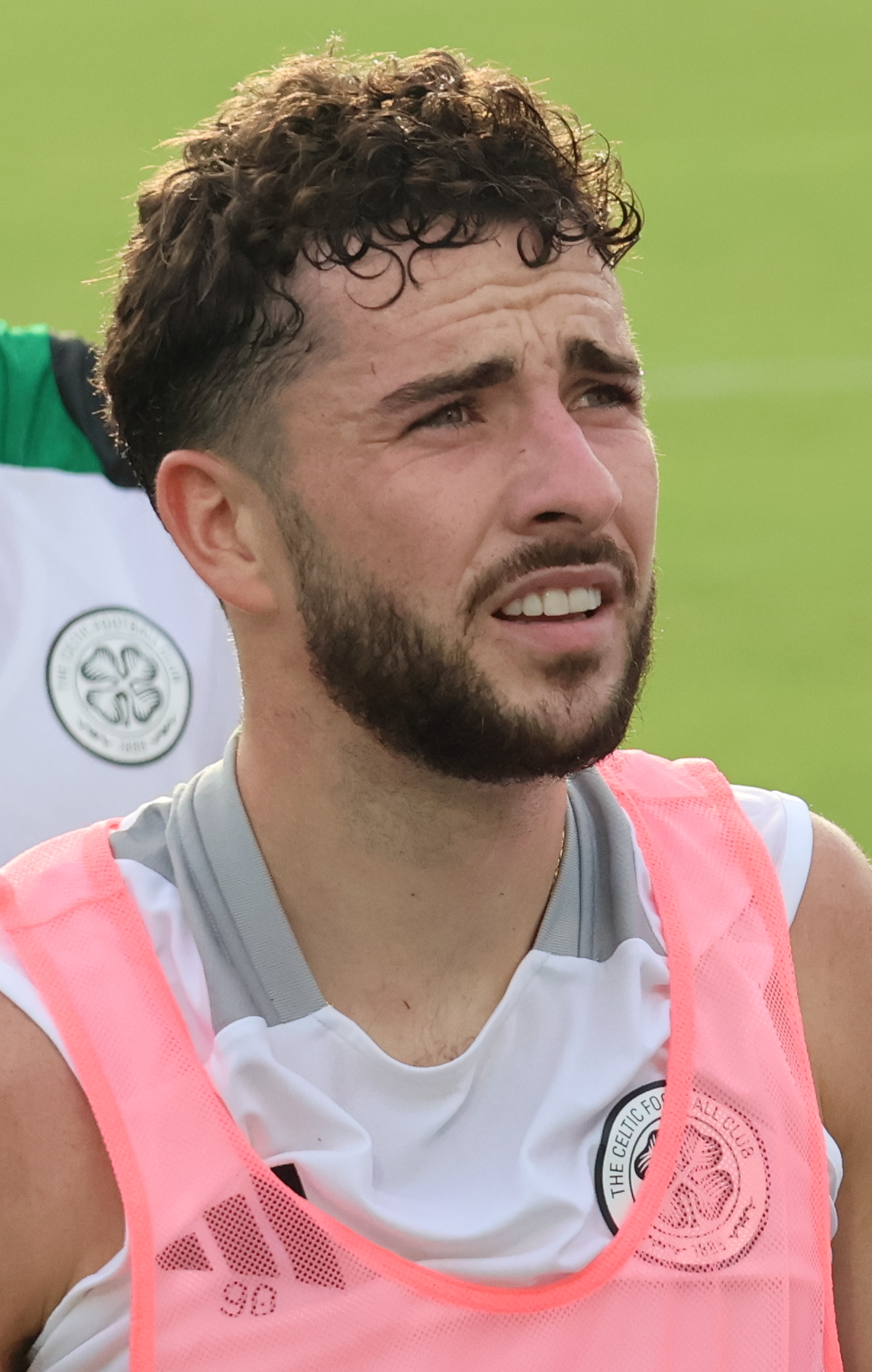
- Johnston training with Celtic in 2024

Personal information
- Full name: Michael Andrew Johnston
- Date of birth: 19 April 1999 (age 27)
- Place of birth: Glasgow, Scotland
- Height: 5 ft 9 in (1.76 m)
- Position: Winger

Team information
- Current team: West Bromwich Albion
- Number: 10

Youth career
- 2008–2017: Celtic

Senior career*
Years	Team	Apps	(Gls)
2017–2024	Celtic	61	(9)
2022–2023	→ Vitória Guimarães (loan)	25	(1)
2024	→ West Bromwich Albion (loan)	18	(7)
2024–	West Bromwich Albion	74	(5)

International career^{‡}
2017	Scotland U19	5	(3)
2018–2019	Scotland U21	3	(1)
2023–	Republic of Ireland	19	(2)
- * Club domestic league appearances and goals as of 1 March 2026 (UTC) ‡ National team caps and goals as of 13 November 2025 (UTC)

Michael Andrew Johnston (born 19 April 1999) is a professional footballer who plays as a winger for EFL Championship club West Bromwich Albion. Born in Scotland, he plays for the Republic of Ireland national team.

== Early life ==
Michael Andrew Johnston was born on 19 April 1999 in Glasgow.

== Club career ==
=== Celtic ===
Johnston made his first-team debut for Celtic on 6 May 2017, in a 4–1 victory over St Johnstone at Celtic Park. Shortly after the game, the winger signed a new three-year contract with his boyhood club.

In November 2018, Johnston signed a contract with Celtic to run until the end of the 2022–23 season. In the following month, Johnston scored his first goal for the club in a 3–0 win against Motherwell.

On 28 November 2019, Johnston scored in a 3–1 victory against Ligue 1 team Stade Rennais in the UEFA Europa League. Johnston signed a new five-year contract with Celtic on 28 December 2019.

Johnston's Celtic career has been disrupted by numerous injuries, which had seen him miss much of the 2019–20 and 2020–21 Scottish Premiership seasons. He subsequently found opportunities rare during the 2021–22 campaign with arrivals Jota, Liel Abada and Daizen Maeda ahead of Johnston in the pecking order for his position.

==== Vitória de Guimarães (loan) ====
During the summer of 2022, manager Ange Postecoglou confirmed that Celtic would look to loan Johnston out for more regular game time, commenting that: "There's definitely a talented footballer there, but sometimes you just need a different environment to help that happen". Belgian Pro League club Standard Liège (managed by former Celtic head coach Ronny Deila) were reportedly interested in his services, along with Scottish Premiership side Hibernian. On 2 September 2022, Johnston went on a season-long loan to Primeira Liga side Vitória de Guimarães. He also signed a one-year extension to his current Celtic deal prior to the move. On 15 October 2022, Johnston scored his first goal and brace for Vitória S.C. in a 3–1 Taça de Portugal win against CF Canelas 2010. On 31 October 2022, Johnston scored his first league goal in a 3–2 home win against Famalicão.

==== West Bromwich Albion (loan) ====
On 1 February 2024, Johnston joined West Bromwich Albion on loan for the remainder of the season. On 13 February 2024, Johnston scored his first goal for the club against Cardiff City, scoring just 30 seconds into the game on his first start for the Baggies. Across March 2024, Johnston scored four goals, assisting another, as he was awarded the EFL Championship Player of the Month.

=== West Bromwich Albion ===
On 30 August 2024, Johnston signed permanently for West Bromwich Albion on a four-year contract.

== International career ==
Johnston was born in Glasgow and represented Scotland in youth internationals. Selected for the Scotland under-21 squad in the 2018 Toulon Tournament, the team lost to Turkey on penalties and finished fourth. He was voted third best player and selected in the Best Tournament XI.

Johnston is eligible to play for the Republic of Ireland through his grandfather, who was born in Londonderry. Ireland manager Stephen Kenny confirmed in March 2023 that the FAI had applied for permission to select Johnston. It was then confirmed by the FAI the same month that the application had been approved by FIFA, and he was selected for their squad later that month.

He made his debut for the Republic of Ireland on 22 March 2023, coming on as a substitute in the 63rd minute of a 3–2 win against Latvia. On 19 June 2023, he scored his first goal for Ireland, the opening goal in a 4–0 win against Gibraltar in a UEFA Euro 2024 qualifier.

== Career statistics ==
=== Club ===
As of match played 5 January 2026

Appearances and goals by club, season and competition
Club	Season	League			National cup (Note: Includes Scottish Cup, Taça de Portugal, FA Cup)		League cup (Note: Includes Scottish League Cup, Taça da Liga, EFL Cup)		Other		Total	
Club	Season	Division	Apps	Goals	Apps	Goals	Apps	Goals	Apps	Goals	Apps	Goals
Celtic Under-20s (Note: Matches in the Scottish Challenge Cup, in which teams from the SPFL Development League compete against senior clubs)	2016–17	—	—		—		—		1 (Note: One appearance in the Scottish Challenge Cup)	0	1	0
Celtic Under-20s	2017–18	—	—		—		—		1 (Note: One appearance in the Scottish Challenge Cup)	0	1	0
Celtic Under-20s	Total		—		—		—		2	0	2	0
Celtic	2016–17	Scottish Premiership	1	0	0	0	0	0	0	0	1	0
Celtic	2017–18	Scottish Premiership	3	0	1	0	0	0	0	0	4	0
Celtic	2018–19	Scottish Premiership	14	5	3	0	1	0	5 (Note: One appearance in the UEFA Champions League and four appearances in the UEFA Europa League)	0	23	5
Celtic	2019–20	Scottish Premiership	11	2	1	0	2	1	8 (Note: Four appearances and one goal in the UEFA Champions League and four appearances and two goals in the UEFA Europa League)	3	22	6
Celtic	2020–21	Scottish Premiership	10	0	0	0	0	0	0	0	10	0
Celtic	2021–22	Scottish Premiership	12	0	2	0	2	0	4 (Note: Three appearances in the UEFA Europa League)	0	20	0
Celtic	2022–23	Scottish Premiership	0	0	—		—		—		0	0
Celtic	2023–24	Scottish Premiership	9	2	1	0	0	0	2 (Note: One appearance in the UEFA Champions League)	0	12	2
Celtic	2024–25	Scottish Premiership	1	0	—		0	0	—		1	0
Celtic	Total		61	9	8	0	5	1	19	3	93	13
Vitória de Guimarães (loan)	2022–23	Primeira Liga	25	1	3	2	3	0	—		31	3
West Bromwich Albion (loan)	2023–24	Championship	18	7	—		—		2 (Note: Appearances in 2024 EFL Championship Play-offs)	0	20	7
West Bromwich Albion	2024–25	Championship	40	3	1	0	0	0	—		41	3
West Bromwich Albion	2025–26	Championship	25	2	0	0	1	0	—		26	2
West Bromwich Albion	Total		65	5	1	0	1	0	0	0	67	5
Career total			171	22	12	2	9	1	23	3	213	28

=== International ===
As of match played 13 November 2025

Appearances and goals by national team and year
National team	Year	Apps	Goals
Republic of Ireland	2023	8	2
Republic of Ireland	2024	5	0
Republic of Ireland	2025	6	0
Total		19	2

List of international goals scored by Mikey Johnston
No.	Date	Venue	Opponent	Score	Result	Competition
1	19 June 2023	Aviva Stadium, Dublin, Ireland	Gibraltar	1–0	3–0	UEFA Euro 2024 qualifying
2	16 October 2023	Estádio Algarve, Faro, Portugal	Gibraltar	2–0	4–0	UEFA Euro 2024 qualifying

== Honours ==
Celtic

- Scottish Premiership (6): 2016–17, 2017–18, 2018–19, 2019–20, 2021–22, 2023–24
- Scottish Cup (3): 2017–18, 2018–19, 2019–20
- Scottish League Cup (3): 2018–19, 2019–20, 2021–22

Individual

- Toulon Tournament Bronze Ball: 2018
- Best XI - 2018 Toulon Tournament
- EFL Championship Player of the Month: March 2024
