= Aymen Mouelhi =

Footballer (born 1986)

Personal information
- Full name: Aymen Mouelhi
- Date of birth: 14 September 1986 (age 40)
- Place of birth: Barcelona, Spain
- Height: 1.89 m (6 ft 2 in)
- Position: Centre-back

Team information
- Current team: Europa
- Number: 16

Youth career
- –2013: Olympique Kef

Senior career*
Years	Team	Apps	(Gls)
2013	Olympique Kef	1	(0)
2013–2015	Europa	28	(1)
2015–2016	Lions Gibraltar	18	(1)
2016–2019	Gibraltar United	65	(6)
2019–2024	St Joseph's	70	(1)
2024–	Europa	51	(2)

International career^{‡}
2018–	Gibraltar	38	(0)
- * Club domestic league appearances and goals as of 18:11, 21 November 2026 (UTC+1) ‡ National team caps and goals as of 21:44, 12 October 2025 (UTC+1)

Aymen Mouelhi (born 14 September 1986) is a semi-professional footballer who plays as a centre-back for Europa. Born in Spain and raised in Tunisia, he plays for the Gibraltar national team, having been naturalised in 2018.

== International career ==
Mouelhi made his international debut for Gibraltar on 16 November 2018, coming on as a substitute in the 83rd minute for Joseph Chipolina in the 2018–19 UEFA Nations League D match against Armenia, which finished as a 6–2 loss. After a particularly impressive performance against Norway which saw the minnows restrict the Scandinavians to only three goals in a respectable defeat, Mouelhi went viral after he quipped that he "expected more" of the highly rated Norwegian striker Erling Haaland, who he had been tasked with marking throughout the game.

== Personal life ==
Mouelhi is a fan of FC Barcelona, being born in the Catalan capital. He now works as a security guard.

== Career statistics ==
=== International ===
As of 12 October 2025

Gibraltar
Year	Apps	Goals
2018	2	0
2019	5	0
2020	6	0
2021	10	0
2022	3	0
2023	10	0
2024	1	0
2025	1	0
Total	38	0
