= Ethan Santos =

Gibraltarian footballer (born 1998)

Personal information
- Full name: Ethan James Santos
- Date of birth: 22 December 1998 (age 27)
- Place of birth: Gibraltar
- Height: 1.84 m (6 ft 0 in)
- Position: Centre back

Team information
- Current team: St Joseph's
- Number: 15

Youth career
- St Joseph's
- –2015: Lynx
- 2015–2016: Europa
- 2016–2017: Manchester 62

Senior career*
Years	Team	Apps	(Gls)
2014–2015	Lynx	1	(0)
2015–2016	Europa	0	(0)
2016–2019	Manchester 62	14	(1)
2019–2022	Mons Calpe	55	(0)
2022–2024	Manchester 62	30	(1)
2023	→ Lynx (loan)	8	(1)
2024–	St Joseph's	41	(2)

International career^{‡}
2019–2020	Gibraltar U21	7	(0)
2021–	Gibraltar	9	(0)
- * Club domestic league appearances and goals as of 18 October 2026 ‡ National team caps and goals as of 9 November 2024

Ethan James Santos (born 22 December 1998) is a Gibraltarian professional footballer who plays as a centre back for Gibraltar Football League club St Joseph's and the Gibraltar national team.

== International career ==
Having been called up numerous times previously, Santos made his international debut for Gibraltar on 27 March 2021 in a 2022 FIFA World Cup qualifying game against Montenegro.

== Career statistics ==
=== International ===
As of 6 June 2024

Gibraltar
Year	Apps	Goals
2021	3	0
2022	1	0
2023	3	0
2024	2	0
Total	9	0
