= 2019–20 Gibraltar National League =

Gibraltar National League
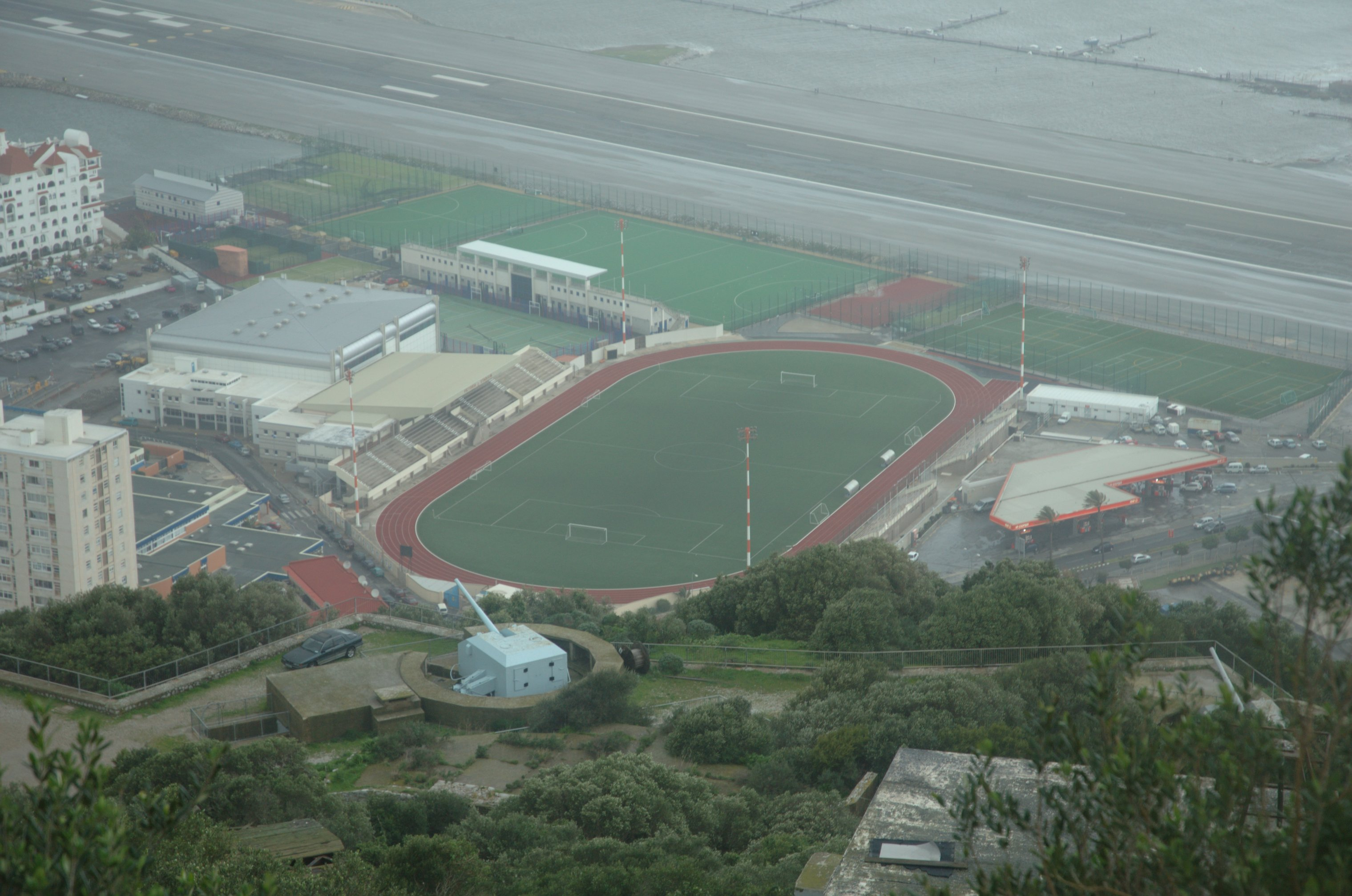
- The Victoria Stadium where each match is played
- Season: 2019–20
- Dates: 12 August 2019 – 3 May 2020
- Champions: No champion
- Champions League: Europa
- Europa League: St Joseph's; Lincoln Red Imps
- Matches: 104
- Goals: 481 (4.63 per match)
- Top goalscorer: Juanfri (24 goals)
- Best goalkeeper: Jamie Robba; Dayle Coleing (7 clean sheets)
- Biggest home win: Lincoln Red Imps 9–1 College 1975 (19 September 2019)
- Biggest away win: College 1975 0–12 Europa (1 November 2019)
- Highest scoring: College 1975 0–12 Europa (1 November 2019); Boca Gibraltar 7–5 College 1975 (20 February 2020); Manchester 62 1–11 Mons Calpe (12 March 2020)
- All statistics correct as of 12 March 2020.

The 2019–20 Gibraltar National League season was the first edition of the Gibraltar National League in Gibraltar, and the 121st edition of football in the territory overall. The league was announced in June 2018 when the Gibraltar Football Association decided to merge the Gibraltar Premier Division and Gibraltar Second Division at the conclusion of the 2018–19 season.

On 1 August 2019, confirmation came that 16 teams would compete in the league. However, this number was revised to 14 teams after two withdrawals, as announced by the GFA eleven days later. The following day, the number of participants was further reduced to 13 when Leo withdrew from the competition.

COVID-19 pandemic would cause the season to be suspended in March 2020. The Challenge Group was abandoned, while the Gibraltar FA looked to conclude the Championship Group in some form. On 1 May 2020, the Gibraltar Football Association announced that the domestic football season had been terminated. After the league had discussions of whether the title would be awarded, the Gibraltar FA announced on 7 May 2020 the season was declared null and void; the title would remain vacant.

== Format ==
On 1 August 2019, the GFA confirmed details of the restructure of domestic football in Gibraltar, and the format of the a new 16 team league. By 12 August, the GFA confirmed two teams would not participate and 14 teams would contest the league. With Leo's withdrawal the next day, the league was reduced to 13. Teams will play one round of games as a single league, before splitting into two groups: the Championship Group contested by the top 7 sides, and the Challenge Group between the bottom 6 sides. The winners of the Challenge Group will receive the GFA Challenge Trophy and receive a bye to the second round of the next season's Rock Cup.

== Teams ==
Location of the stadium where all teams play

16 teams were initially expected to participate in the inaugural National League, with Hound Dogs dropping down to the 2019–20 Gibraltar Intermediate League, having been granted special dispensation by the GFA.

On 9 August, Gibraltar Phoenix withdrew from the league. Two days before, Gibraltar United were threatened with expulsion if they failed to repay debts by 12 August.

On 12 August, the GFA confirmed the withdrawal of Gibraltar Phoenix and Gibraltar United. The day after, Leo withdrew from the league too, after a takeover by King's Lynn Town owner Stephen Cleeve was blocked by the GFA. On 22 August, it was reported that Olympique 13 were at risk of withdrawing from the league, having forfeited their game against Europa due to a shortage of players. They were expelled on 11 September.

Teams with a blue background played in the 2018–19 Gibraltar Premier Division. Teams with a red background played in the 2018–19 Gibraltar Second Division.

Note: Flags indicate national team as has been defined under FIFA eligibility rules. Players may hold more than one non-FIFA nationality.

Team	Manager	Captain	Kit manufacturer	Club sponsor	2018–19
Boca Gibraltar	(England) Craig Cowell	(Gibraltar) Julio Bado	ES	Coral; Kids Come First	10th
Bruno's Magpies	(Spain) Juan Maria Sánchez	(Gibraltar) Brian Perez	Joma	GVC Holdings; Chestertons	1st
College 1975	(Spain) Ángel Espinosa	(Gibraltar) Nazim Hughes	Joma		5th
Europa	(Spain) Rafa Escobar	(Gibraltar) Liam Walker	Jako	La Parrilla; Betfred	2nd
Europa Point	(England) Ian Hendon	(Gibraltar) Antony Moulds	Admiral	Isolas	2nd
Glacis United	(Italy) Michele Di Piedi	(Italy) Michele Di Piedi	Nike		8th
Lincoln Red Imps	(Spain) Germán Crespo	(Gibraltar) Roy Chipolina	adidas	Mansion.com	1st
Lions Gibraltar	(Spain) Albert Ferri	(Spain) Alberto Caravaca	Givova		9th
Lynx	(Gibraltar) Albert Parody	(Gibraltar) Mohamed Badr	Givova (home); Zaror (away)	Resolve Salvage & Fire	7th
Manchester 62	(Scotland) David Wilson	(Gibraltar) Robert Montovio	Joma	CEPSA GIB	4th
Mons Calpe	(Argentina) Luis Manuel Blanco	(Gibraltar) Kivan Castle	Joma		4th
St Joseph's	(Spain) Raúl Procopio Baizán	(Spain) Boro	Joma	M Price	3rd

=== Managerial changes ===
Team	Outgoing manager	Manner of departure	Date of vacancy	Position in table	Incoming manager	Date of appointment
Boca Gibraltar	(Gibraltar) Allen Bula	End of contract	20 May 2019	Pre-season	(Gibraltar) Christian Ressa	24 July 2019
Europa Point	(Spain) José Ramón Rojas	End of contract	25 May 2019	Pre-season	(Gibraltar) Allen Bula	20 June 2019
Glacis United	(Argentina) Jesús Napolitano	End of contract	25 May 2019	Pre-season	(Netherlands) Bennie Brinkman	1 July 2019
College 1975	(Gibraltar) Nolan Bosio	Resigned	25 May 2019	Pre-season	(Spain) Jesús Cano	1 June 2019
Mons Calpe	(Argentina) Luis Manuel Blanco	Resigned	28 May 2019	Pre-season	(Brazil) William	11 June 2019
Leo	(Spain) Paco Sánchez	Moved to Assistant Manager	15 June 2019	Pre-season	(Spain) Dani Amaya	15 June 2019
Manchester 62	(Gibraltar) Jonathan Sodi	Resigned	19 June 2019	Pre-season	(England) Jeff Wood	19 June 2019
Mons Calpe	(Brazil) William	Resigned	10 July 2019	Pre-season	(Spain) David Sanz	19 July 2019
Mons Calpe	(Spain) David Sanz	Resigned	30 July 2019	Pre-season	(Spain) Lorenzo Morón	1 August 2019
Lynx	(Spain) Carlos Gobantes	Signed by Mons Calpe U23	1 August 2019	Pre-season	(Gibraltar) Albert Parody	2 August 2019
Glacis United	(Netherlands) Bennie Brinkman	Mutual consent	3 September 2019	11th	(Italy) Michele Di Piedi	3 September 2019
Bruno's Magpies	(Scotland) David Wilson	Sacked	3 October 2019	5th	(Spain) Alfonso Cortijo	18 October 2019
Mons Calpe	(Spain) Lorenzo Morón	Sacked	11 October 2019	6th	(Argentina) Leonardo Vela	18 October 2019
Boca Gibraltar	(Gibraltar) Christian Ressa	Moved to Assistant Manager	18 October 2019	11th	(Spain) Juan Maria Sánchez	18 October 2019
Manchester 62	(England) Jeff Wood	Mutual consent	21 October 2019	8th	(Scotland) David Wilson	5 November 2019
Europa Point	(Gibraltar) Allen Bula	Resigned	8 November 2019	10th	(England) Ian Hendon	26 November 2019
Boca Gibraltar	(Spain) Juan Maria Sánchez	Resigned	8 November 2019	8th	(Spain) Juan Carlos Camacho	12 November 2019
Lincoln Red Imps	(Spain) Víctor Afonso	Mutual consent	19 December 2019	3rd	(Spain) Germán Crespo	4 January 2020
Mons Calpe	(Argentina) Leonardo Vela	Mutual consent	1 January 2020	7th	(Argentina) Luis Manuel Blanco	1 January 2020
Bruno's Magpies	(Spain) Alfonso Cortijo	Resigned	3 January 2020	5th	(Spain) Juan Maria Sánchez	3 January 2020
Boca Gibraltar	(Spain) Juan Carlos Camacho	Mutual consent	9 January 2020	9th	(England) Craig Cowell	9 January 2020
College 1975	(Spain) Jesús Cano	Sacked	1 February 2020	12th	(Spain) Ángel Espinosa	1 February 2020

== League table ==
Data displayed was prior to the termination of the season. There were no official league games this season as all results were expunged.

Pos	Team	Pld	W	D	L	GF	GA	GD	Pts	Qualification or relegation (Note: Teams play each other once (11 matches), before the league splits into two groups (the top six and the bottom six) for the last 10 matches.)
1	Europa (C, Q)	17	16	1	0	85	9	+76	49	Qualification for the Champions League first qualifying round (Note: Europa were crowned de facto champions after the season ended due to the COVID-19 pandemic in Gibraltar.)
2	St Joseph's (Q)	17	14	2	1	58	15	+43	44	Qualification to the Europa League preliminary round
3	Lincoln Red Imps (Q)	17	13	0	4	68	15	+53	39	Qualification to the Europa League preliminary round
4	Lynx	17	9	2	6	37	30	+7	29	
5	Bruno's Magpies	17	7	0	10	29	41	−12	21	
6	Lions Gibraltar	17	4	3	10	30	55	−25	15	
7	Mons Calpe	18	10	3	5	49	29	+20	33	
8	Europa Point	18	7	4	7	35	38	−3	25	
9	Manchester 62	18	6	1	11	21	49	−28	19	
10	Boca Gibraltar	17	4	4	9	30	45	−15	16	
11	Glacis United	17	3	1	13	21	56	−35	10	
12	College 1975	18	0	1	17	18	99	−81	1	
13	Olympique 13 (Note: On 22 August, it was reported that Olympique 13 were at risk of withdrawing from the league, having forfeited their game against Europa due to a shortage of players. They were expelled on 11 September after forfeiting their next games.) (D, R)	0	0	0	0	0	0	0	0	Disqualified before the end of the season
14	Leo (Note: On 13 August 2019, Leo withdrew after a takeover by King's Lynn Town owner Stephen Cleeve was blocked by the GFA.) (D, R)	0	0	0	0	0	0	0	0	Did not start the season
15	Gibraltar United (Note: On 7 August 2019, Gibraltar United were threatened with expulsion if they failed to repay debts by 12 August. It was revealed that the club had until the following Monday to repay all of their debts or face expulsion. On 12 August 2019, the team were expelled for not repaying their debts.) (R, D)	0	0	0	0	0	0	0	0	Did not start the season
16	Gibraltar Phoenix (Note: On 9 August, Gibraltar Phoenix withdrew from the league, with club owners citing heavy losses in recent years and a lack of success in selling the club to potential investors as the main reasons to cease operations.) (R)	0	0	0	0	0	0	0	0	Did not start the season
17	Hound Dogs (Note: Hound Dogs dropped down to the 2019–20 Gibraltar Intermediate League, having been granted special dispensation by the GFA.) (T)	0	0	0	0	0	0	0	0	Will play in the 2019–20 Gibraltar Intermediate League since they were granted special permission by the Gibraltar FA to participate as a senior side.

Source: UEFA, Soccerway
Rules for classification: 1) Points; 2) Goal difference; 3) Goals scored
(C) Champions; (D) Disqualified; (Q) Qualified for the phase indicated; (R) Relegated; (T) Qualified, but not yet for the particular phase indicated

== Results ==
Matches 1–11
Home \ Away	BOC	BRU	COL	EFC	EPO	GLA	LIN	LGI	LYN	MAN	MON	SJO
Boca Gibraltar		1–2			1–1		1–8		1–3		1–1	
Bruno's Magpies				0–6			0–3	2–0			1–3	0–3
College 1975	0–4	1–3		0–12				1–6		0–3	1–9	
Europa	6–1				1–0	6–2	4–1		2–0			2–2
Europa Point		2–3	6–1			0–3			0–5	1–3		
Glacis United	0–2	0–9	4–0					1–3		2–3	0–5	
Lincoln Red Imps			9–1		3–0	8–0			4–0	2–0		
Lions Gibraltar	6–4			2–5	0–0		1–7		0–0			0–4
Lynx		2–0	4–0			3–2				5–0	5–1	
Manchester 62	0–0	0–2		0–7				0–3			1–4	
Mons Calpe				0–7	0–2		0–2	1–1				0–6
St Joseph's	2–0		7–0		5–0	8–1	2–1		1–1	3–0		

Source: UEFA
Legend: Blue = home team win; Yellow = draw; Red = away team win.

Championship Group
Home \ Away	BRU	EFC	LIN	LGI	LYN	SJO
Bruno's Magpies		0–5	1–5			1–2
Europa				5–0	5–0	3–1
Lincoln Red Imps		0–2		7–1	5–0	
Lions Gibraltar	2–3	0–7			2–3	
Lynx	3–1		1–3			2–3
St Joseph's	3–1		1–0	5–3		

Source: GFA
Legend: Blue = home team win; Yellow = draw; Red = away team win.

Challenge Group
Home \ Away	BOC	COL	EPO	GLA	MAN	MON
Boca Gibraltar		7–5	2–4			0–2
College 1975			2–6	1–2		0–6
Europa Point	2–1	5–5		2–1	3–1	
Glacis United	2–2				1–2	0–1
Manchester 62	1–2	5–0		1–0		1–11
Mons Calpe		1–0	1–1		3–0	

Source: GFA
Legend: Blue = home team win; Yellow = draw; Red = away team win.

== Season statistics ==
=== Scoring ===
As of 12 March 2020

==== Top scorers ====
Rank	Player	Club	Goals
1	(Spain) Juanfri	St Joseph's	24
2	(Gibraltar) Liam Walker	Europa	21
3	(Spain) Kike Gómez	Lincoln Red Imps	15
4	(Spain) Manu Dimas	Europa	14
5	(Spain) Germán Cortés	Boca Gibraltar	12
5	(Spain) Juampe	Europa	12
5	(Spain) Alberto Caravaca	Lions Gibraltar	12
5	(Spain) Boro	St Joseph's	12
9	(Spain) Sergio Molina Rivero	Lincoln Red Imps	9
9	(Spain) Gato	Lincoln Red Imps	9

==== Hat-tricks ====
Player	For	Against	Result	Date
(Spain) Boro	St Joseph's	College 1975	7–0 (H)	19 August 2019
(Argentina) Leonardo Carboni	Mons Calpe	College 1975	9–1 (A)	24 August 2019
(Spain) Gato	Lincoln Red Imps	College 1975	9–1 (H)	19 September 2019
(Spain) Sergio Molina Rivero	Lincoln Red Imps	College 1975	9–1 (H)	19 September 2019
(Spain) Sergio Molina Rivero	Lincoln Red Imps	Lions Gibraltar	7–1 (A)	29 September 2019
(Spain) Juanfri^{4}	St Joseph's	Glacis United	8–1 (H)	20 October 2019
(Spain) Boro^{4}	St Joseph's	Glacis United	8–1 (H)	20 October 2019
(Spain) Germán Cortés	Boca Gibraltar	College 1975	4–0 (A)	24 October 2019
(Spain) Juanfri	St Joseph's	Lions Gibraltar	4–0 (A)	26 October 2019
(Spain) Manu Dimas	Europa	College 1975	12–0 (A)	1 November 2019
(Gibraltar) Liam Walker	Europa	College 1975	12–0 (A)	1 November 2019
(Spain) Juanfri	St Joseph's	Mons Calpe	6–0 (A)	24 November 2019
(Philippines) Kike Gómez	Lincoln Red Imps	Boca Gibraltar	8–1 (A)	27 November 2019
(Spain) Juampe	Europa	Glacis United	6–2 (H)	29 November 2019
(Spain) Manu Dimas	Europa	Lions Gibraltar	5–0 (H)	17 January 2020
(Gibraltar) Julian Del Rio	Lincoln Red Imps	Lynx	5–0 (H)	18 January 2020
(Spain) Dylan Hernández	Lynx	Bruno's Magpies	3–1 (H)	1 February 2020
(France) James Adams	Boca Gibraltar	College 1975	7–5 (H)	20 February 2020
(Spain) Germán Cortés	Boca Gibraltar	College 1975	7–5 (H)	20 February 2020
(Spain) José Oncala^{4}	College 1975	Boca Gibraltar	5–7 (A)	20 February 2020
(Nigeria) Sunday Emmanuel	Lincoln Red Imps	Lions Gibraltar	7–1 (H)	21 February 2020
(Brazil) Andre Dos Santos	Mons Calpe	Manchester 62	11–1 (A)	12 March 2020
(Argentina) Santiago Pastorini	Mons Calpe	Manchester 62	11–1 (A)	12 March 2020

==== Clean Sheets ====
Rank	Player	Club	Clean sheets
1	(Gibraltar) Jamie Robba	St Joseph's	7
1	(Gibraltar) Dayle Coleing	Europa	7
2	(Argentina) Christian Fraiz	Mons Calpe	6
4	(Spain) Javi Muñoz	Europa	5
4	(Gibraltar) Kyle Goldwin	Lincoln Red Imps	5
6	(Gibraltar) Bradley Banda	Lynx	4
7	(Spain) Francisco Pérez	Lions Gibraltar	3
7	(Gibraltar) Matt Cafer	Bruno's Magpies	3
7	(Gibraltar) Frank Warwick	Manchester 62	3
10	(Gibraltar) Jordan Perez	Boca Gibraltar	2
10	(England) Conor O'Keefe (Note: Includes 2 clean sheets for Europa Point.)	Bruno's Magpies	2
10	(Gibraltar) Ivan Moreno	Glacis United	2
10	(Spain) Manuel Soler	Lincoln Red Imps	2

== Awards ==
=== Player of the week ===
Week	Player	Club	Reference
1	(Gibraltar) Liam Walker	Europa	
2	(Croatia) Marko Marcius	Lynx	
3	(Gibraltar) Jaron Vinet	Mons Calpe	
4	(Gibraltar) Michael Ruiz	Glacis United	
5	(Spain) Sergio Molina Rivero	Lincoln Red Imps	
6	(Spain) Boro	St Joseph's	
7	(Guinea-Bissau) Idé Gomes	Lincoln Red Imps	
8	(Spain) Luisma	Lions Gibraltar	
9	(Spain) Juanfri	St Joseph's	

Week	Player	Club	Reference
10	(Spain) Juampe	Europa	
11	(Spain) Juampe	Europa	
12	(Gibraltar) Jamie Robba	St Joseph's	
13	(Gibraltar) Julian Del Rio	Lincoln Red Imps	
14	(Philippines) Kike Gómez	Lincoln Red Imps	
15	(Spain) Dylan Hernández	Lynx	
16	(Spain) Willy	Europa	
17	(Nigeria) Sunday Emmanuel	Lincoln Red Imps	
18	(Gibraltar) Liam Walker	Europa	

=== Monthly awards ===
Month	Manager of the Month		Player of the Month		Reference
Month	Manager	Club	Player	Club	Reference
August	(Gibraltar) Albert Parody	Lynx	(Spain) Alberto Valdivia	Lynx	
September	(Spain) Víctor Afonso	Lincoln Red Imps	(Spain) Sergio Molina Rivero	Lincoln Red Imps	
October	(Spain) Víctor Afonso	Lincoln Red Imps	(Spain) Juanfri	St Joseph's	
November	(Spain) Rafa Escobar	Europa	(Gibraltar) Liam Walker	Europa	
December	(Spain) Albert Ferri	Lions Gibraltar	(Spain) Alberto Caravaca	Lions Gibraltar	
January	(Spain) Rafa Escobar	Europa	(Gibraltar) Julian Del Rio	Lincoln Red Imps	
February	(Spain) Rafa Escobar	Europa	(Gibraltar) Dayle Coleing	Europa	

=== End-of-season awards ===
End of season awards were handed out by Football Gibraltar, the Gibraltar Football Association's official UEFA correspondents, on 28 May and 2 June 2020.

Award	Winner	Club	Nominees		
Award	Winner	Club	Rank	Player	Club
Manager of the Season	(Spain) Rafa Escobar	Europa	2	(Spain) Raúl Procopio Baizán	St Joseph's
Manager of the Season	(Spain) Rafa Escobar	Europa	3	(Spain) Albert Ferri	Lions Gibraltar
Manager of the Season	(Spain) Rafa Escobar	Europa	4	(Gibraltar) Albert Parody	Lynx
Goalkeeper of the Season	(Gibraltar) Dayle Coleing	Europa	2	(Gibraltar) Jamie Robba	St Joseph's
Goalkeeper of the Season	(Gibraltar) Dayle Coleing	Europa	3	(Gibraltar) Kyle Goldwin	Lincoln Red Imps
Goalkeeper of the Season	(Gibraltar) Dayle Coleing	Europa	4	(Gibraltar) Bradley Banda	Lynx
Defender of the Season	(Spain) Olmo González	Europa	2	(Spain) Sergio Sánchez	Europa
Defender of the Season	(Spain) Olmo González	Europa	3	(Spain) Ezequiel Rojas	St Joseph's
Defender of the Season	(Spain) Olmo González	Europa	4	(Portugal) Bernardo Lopes	Lincoln Red Imps
Midfielder of the Season	(Gibraltar) Liam Walker	Europa	2	(Spain) Christian Pecci	St Joseph's
Midfielder of the Season	(Gibraltar) Liam Walker	Europa	3	(Spain) Alejandro Avilés	Europa
Midfielder of the Season	(Gibraltar) Liam Walker	Europa	4	(England) Dan Bent	Bruno's Magpies
Striker of the Season	(Spain) Juanfri	St Joseph's	2	(Spain) Juampe	Europa
Striker of the Season	(Spain) Juanfri	St Joseph's	3	(Philippines) Kike Gómez	Lincoln Red Imps
Striker of the Season	(Spain) Juanfri	St Joseph's	4	(Spain) Alberto Caravaca	Lions Gibraltar
Player of the Season	(Gibraltar) Liam Walker	Europa	2	(Spain) Juanfri	St Joseph's
Player of the Season	(Gibraltar) Liam Walker	Europa	3	(Spain) Juampe	Europa
Young Player of the Season	(Gibraltar) Jayce Olivero	Europa	2	(Gibraltar) Ethan Britto	Lincoln Red Imps
Young Player of the Season	(Gibraltar) Jayce Olivero	Europa	3	(Gibraltar) Jaron Vinet	Bruno's Magpies
Challenge Group Player of the Season	(Brazil) Andre dos Santos	Mons Calpe	N/A		
Challenge Group Young Player of the Season	(Gibraltar) Ayoub El Hmidi	Mons Calpe	N/A		
Fans' Player of the Season	(Gibraltar) Liam Walker	Europa	2	(Gibraltar) Dayle Coleing	Europa
Fans' Player of the Season	(Gibraltar) Liam Walker	Europa	3	(Philippines) Kike Gómez	Lincoln Red Imps
Fans' Young Player of the Season	(Gibraltar) Ayoub El Hmidi	Mons Calpe	2	(Gibraltar) Jayce Olivero	Europa
Fans' Young Player of the Season	(Gibraltar) Ayoub El Hmidi	Mons Calpe	3	(Gibraltar) Ethan Britto	Lincoln Red Imps

Fans' Team of the Season

Goalkeeper	Defenders	Midfielders	Forwards
(Gibraltar) Dayle Coleing	(Gibraltar) Jack Sergeant (Portugal) Bernardo Lopes (Spain) Olmo González (Gibraltar) Jayce Olivero	(Gibraltar) Lee Casciaro (Spain) Nacho Fernández (Gibraltar) Aymen Mouelhi (Gibraltar) Liam Walker	(Spain) Juanfri (Philippines) Kike Gómez
