= 2022–23 Gibraltar Football League =

Gibraltar Football League
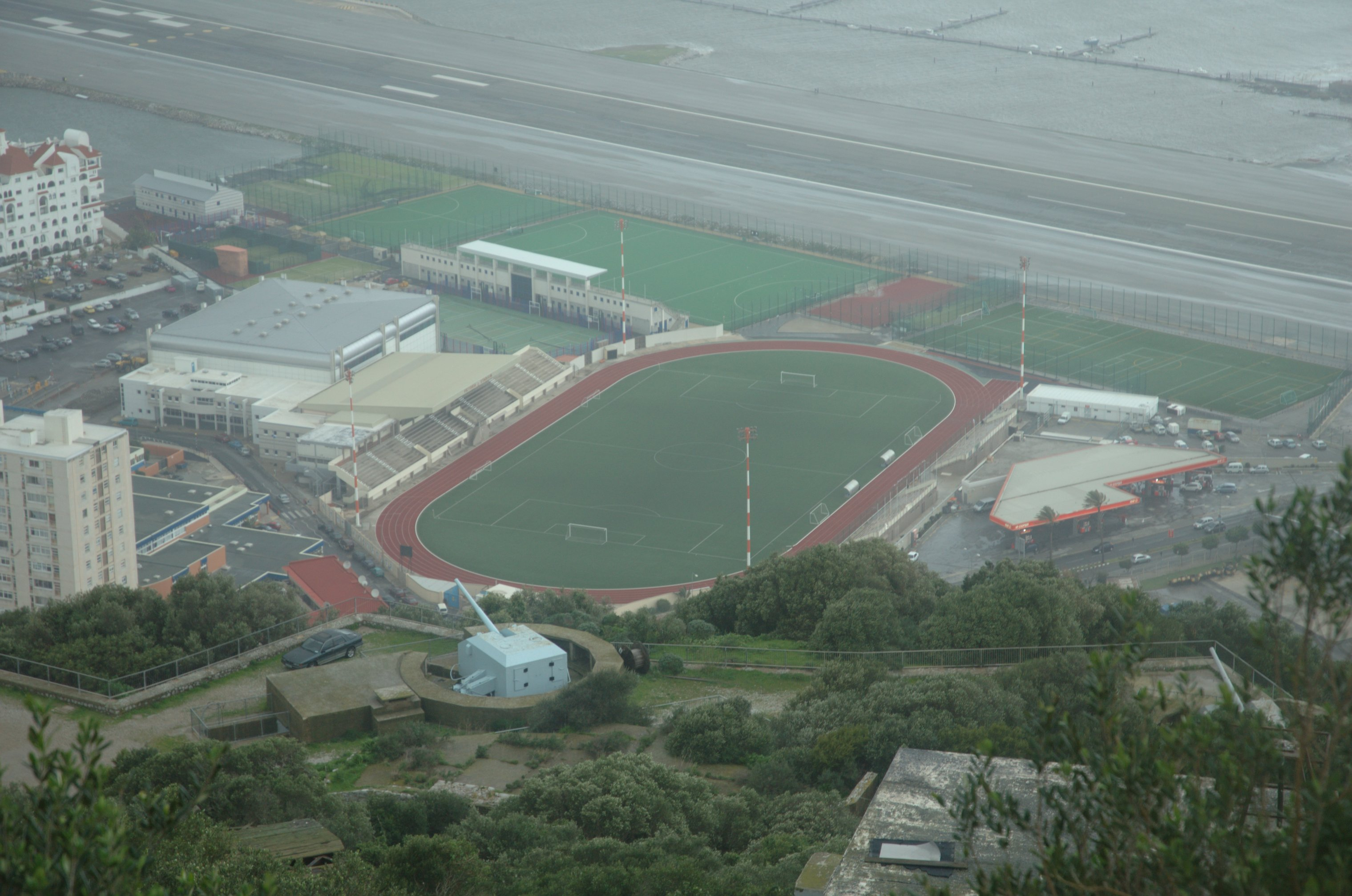
- The Victoria Stadium where each match is played
- Season: 2022–23
- Dates: 30 September 2022 - 23 April 2023
- Champions: Lincoln Red Imps; 3rd GFL title 27th overall
- Champions League: Lincoln Red Imps
- Europa Conference League: Europa; Bruno's Magpies
- Matches: 105
- Goals: 360 (3.43 per match)
- Top goalscorer: Juanfri (21 goals)
- Best goalkeeper: 2 players (7 clean sheets)
- All statistics correct as of 23 April 2023.

The 2022–23 Gibraltar Football League season is the fourth season of the Gibraltar Football League in Gibraltar (first under its current name), and the 124th season of football on the territory overall. The league is due to kick off in Autumn 2022. Lincoln Red Imps are the reigning champions, winning their second title in April 2022. Due to the league's fall down the UEFA coefficient rankings, this season only 2 teams will qualify for the UEFA Europa Conference League.

== Format ==
The structure of the league is expected to follow that of the previous three seasons. Teams will play one round of games as a single league, before splitting into two groups: the Championship Group contested by the top 6 sides, and the Challenge Group between the bottom 5 sides. The winners of the Challenge Group will receive the GFA Challenge Trophy and receive a bye to the second round of the next season's Rock Cup.

== Teams ==
Location of the stadium where all teams play

The Gibraltar FA announced the clubs who had obtained licences to compete in the 2022–23 season on 17 May 2022. Six clubs were granted UEFA club licences: Bruno's Magpies, Glacis United, Lincoln Red Imps, Lions Gibraltar, Europa and St Joseph's. 5 clubs were granted Gibraltar FA Domestic 'Gold' Licenses: College 1975, Europa Point, Lynx, Manchester 62 and Mons Calpe, who lost their UEFA license. As such, the league is unchanged from the previous season.

Note: Flags indicate national team as has been defined under FIFA eligibility rules. Players may hold more than one non-FIFA nationality.

Team	Manager	Captain	Kit manufacturer	Club sponsor	2021–22
Bruno's Magpies	(England) Nathan Rooney	(Gibraltar) Kyle Casciaro	Macron	Chestertons	4th
College 1975	(Argentina) Luis Manuel Blanco	(Gibraltar) Adam Gracia	Joma		8th
Europa	(Spain) Miguel Ángel Berlanga	(Gibraltar) Jayce Olivero	Kappa	Situs Construction	2nd
Europa Point	(Gibraltar) Garry Lowe	(Spain) Daniel Tudela	Xtreme Sports China	BLOKK	10th
Glacis United	(Italy) Michele Di Piedi	(Spain) Nacho Fernández	Macron	LOBO	5th
Lincoln Red Imps	(Spain) Javi Muñoz	(Gibraltar) Roy Chipolina	Givova	Damex	1st
Lions Gibraltar	(Gibraltar) Adrian Parral	(Spain) Antonio Cintas	Macron		11th
Lynx	(Gibraltar) Albert Parody	(Gibraltar) Jesse Victory	Givova	Grupo Casais	9th
Manchester 62	(England) Jamie McDonough	(Gibraltar) Kieron Garcia	Macron	GADS	7th
Mons Calpe	(Spain) David Guti	(Argentina) Emanuel Ojeda	Givova	FanPlay 365	6th
St Joseph's	(Spain) Abraham Paz	(Gibraltar) Aymen Mouelhi	Legea		3rd

=== Managerial changes ===
Team	Outgoing manager	Manner of departure	Date of vacancy	Position in table	Incoming manager	Date of appointment
Mons Calpe	(Spain) Leo Fuentes	Mutual consent	1 May 2022	Pre-season	(Gibraltar) Allen Bula	17 May 2022
St Joseph's	(Spain) Jaime Molina	Mutual consent	1 May 2022	Pre-season	(Spain) Abraham Paz	8 June 2022
Lions Gibraltar	(Spain) Paco Luna	Mutual consent	1 May 2022	Pre-season	(Gibraltar) Adrian Parral	17 June 2022
Europa Point	(England) Tommy Taylor	Mutual consent	1 May 2022	Pre-season	(Gibraltar) Garry Lowe	1 July 2022
Lincoln Red Imps	(England) Mick McElwee	Resigned	9 May 2022	Pre-season	(Spain) Raúl Castillo	18 May 2022
Europa	(Spain) Arteaga	Sacked	2 September 2022	Pre-season	(Gibraltar) Steven Cummings	2 September 2022
Mons Calpe	(Gibraltar) Allen Bula	Sacked	9 October 2022	8th	(Spain) David Guti	12 October 2022
Manchester 62	(Scotland) David Wilson	Sacked	11 October 2022	11th	(England) Jamie McDonough	11 October 2022
Lincoln Red Imps	(Spain) Raúl Castillo	Resigned	31 December 2022	2nd	(Spain) Javi Muñoz	31 December 2022
College 1975	(Spain) Ángel Espinosa	Sacked	9 January 2023	11th	(Argentina) Luis Manuel Blanco	16 January 2023
Europa	(Gibraltar) Steven Cummings	Mutual consent	1 March 2023	3rd	(Spain) Miguel Ángel Berlanga	2 March 2023

== League table ==
Pos	Team	Pld	W	D	L	GF	GA	GD	Pts	Qualification or relegation (Note: Teams play each other once (10 matches), before the league splits into two groups (the top six and the bottom five) for the last 10 respectively 8 matches.)
1	Europa	10	8	1	1	34	4	+30	25	Qualification for the Championship Group
2	Lincoln Red Imps	10	8	1	1	36	8	+28	25	Qualification for the Championship Group
3	Bruno's Magpies	10	8	1	1	24	5	+19	25	Qualification for the Championship Group
4	St Joseph's	10	6	1	3	26	10	+16	19	Qualification for the Championship Group
5	Lynx	10	6	1	3	19	9	+10	19	Qualification for the Championship Group
6	Glacis United	10	4	0	6	14	20	−6	12	Qualification for the Championship Group
7	Lions Gibraltar	10	3	2	5	11	20	−9	11	Qualification for the Challenge Group
8	Mons Calpe	10	3	1	6	7	14	−7	10	Qualification for the Challenge Group
9	Manchester 62	10	2	1	7	12	23	−11	7	Qualification for the Challenge Group
10	Europa Point	10	1	1	8	7	45	−38	4	Qualification for the Challenge Group
11	College 1975	10	1	0	9	4	32	−28	3	Qualification for the Challenge Group

Source: Soccerway
Rules for classification: 1) Points; 2) Head-to-head points; 3) Head-to-head goal difference; 4) Fair Play

== Results ==
Home \ Away	BRU	COL	EFC	EPO	GLA	LIN	LGI	LYN	MAN	MON	SJO
Bruno's Magpies				7–0			2–0	0–1	1–0	2–0	
College 1975	0–4			0–4	1–0	0–5					1–4
Europa	1–1	5–0			7–0	0–1		2–1			1–0
Europa Point			0–9		0–4		0–1				0–6
Glacis United	1–2						1–0	0–2		3–0	2–1
Lincoln Red Imps	1–3			10–0	4–1		6–0		3–0	2–1	
Lions Gibraltar		5–1	0–3					0–0	3–2	1–1	1–4
Lynx		1–0		5–1		1–2			4–2		
Manchester 62		2–0	1–4	2–2	3–2						0–3
Mons Calpe		2–1	0–2	1–0				0–3	1–0		
St Joseph's	1–2					2–2		2–1		3–0	

Source: Soccerway
Legend: Blue = home team win; Yellow = draw; Red = away team win.
- The match between St Joseph's and Mons Calpe on 16 December 2022 originally finished 2–2, but was later awarded as a 3–0 win to St Joseph's.

== Championship and Challenge groups ==
=== Championship Group ===
Pos	Team	Pld	W	D	L	GF	GA	GD	Pts	Qualification or relegation
1	Lincoln Red Imps (C)	20	17	1	2	68	14	+54	52	Qualification for the Champions League first qualifying round
2	Europa	20	14	2	4	48	15	+33	44	Qualification for the Europa Conference League first qualifying round
3	Bruno's Magpies	20	11	4	5	39	18	+21	37	Qualification for the Europa Conference League first qualifying round
4	Lynx	20	10	3	7	33	29	+4	33	
5	St Joseph's	20	10	2	8	36	25	+11	32	
6	Glacis United	20	4	1	15	19	49	−30	13	

Source: Flashscore
Rules for classification: 1) Points; 2) Head-to-head points; 3) Head-to-head goal difference; 4) Fair Play
(C) Champions

=== Championship Group results ===
Home \ Away	BRU	EFC	GLA	LIN	LYN	SJO
Bruno's Magpies		1–2	3–0	1–5	1–1	0–1
Europa	0–0		4–2	0–2	2–1	3–0
Glacis United	0–0	0–1		0–5	0–2	0–2
Lincoln Red Imps	3–1	1–2	4–1		4–0	1–0
Lynx	0–5	2–0	5–2	1–4		1–1
St Joseph's	1–3	2–0	3–2	0–3	0–2	

Source: Flashscore
Legend: Blue = home team win; Yellow = draw; Red = away team win.

=== Challenge Group ===
Pos	Team	Pld	W	D	L	GF	GA	GD	Pts	Qualification
1	Mons Calpe	18	9	1	8	26	26	0	28	GFA Challenge Trophy and bye in 2023–24 Rock Cup
2	Manchester 62	18	9	1	8	34	30	+4	28	
3	Lions Gibraltar	18	5	4	9	25	37	−12	19	
4	College 1975	18	2	3	13	19	51	−32	9	
5	Europa Point	18	1	4	13	12	65	−53	7	

Source: Flashscore
Rules for classification: 1) Points; 2) Head-to-head points; 3) Head-to-head goal difference; 4) Fair Play

=== Challenge Group results ===
Home \ Away	COL	EPO	LGI	MAN	MON
College 1975		2–2	4–1	2–4	2–3
Europa Point	1–1		0–5	0–4	1–4
Lions Gibraltar	2–2	0–0		0–4	2–5
Manchester 62	4–1	2–0	2–1		0–2
Mons Calpe	2–1	2–1	0–3	1–2	

Source: Flashscore
Legend: Blue = home team win; Yellow = draw; Red = away team win.

== Season statistics ==
=== Top scorers ===
Rank	Player	Club	Goals
1	(Spain) Juanfri	Lincoln Red Imps	21
2	(Philippines) Kike Gómez	Lincoln Red Imps	17
3	(Cuba) Aldair Ruiz	Lynx	12
3	(Republic of Ireland) Aodhán O'Hara	Manchester 62	12
5	(Argentina) Pibe	Bruno's Magpies	11
6	(Senegal) Ibrahima Ndiaye	Europa	8
6	(Spain) Labra	Lions Gibraltar	8
6	(Spain) Boro	St Joseph's	8
9	(Gibraltar) Anthony Hernandez	Europa	7
9	(Spain) Sergio Rivera	Europa	7
9	(Albania) Xhelal Terziqi	Glacis United	7
9	(Gibraltar) Liam Walker	Lincoln Red Imps	7

=== Hat-tricks ===
Player	For	Against	Result	Date
(Saint Lucia) Kegan Caull	Europa Point	College 1975	4–0 (A)	2 October 2022
(Philippines) Kike Gómez ^{5}	Lincoln Red Imps	Europa Point	10–0 (H)	16 October 2022
(Spain) Juanfri	Lincoln Red Imps	Europa Point	10–0 (H)	16 October 2022
(Spain) Sergio Rivera	Europa	Europa Point	9–0 (A)	23 October 2022
(Argentina) Pibe ^{4}	Bruno's Magpies	Europa Point	7–0 (H)	29 October 2022
(Philippines) Kike Gómez	Lincoln Red Imps	Glacis United	4–1 (H)	30 October 2022
(Spain) Juanfri	Lincoln Red Imps	College 1975	5–0 (H)	26 November 2022
(Senegal) Ibrahima Ndiaye	Europa	College 1975	5–0 (H)	3 December 2022
(Albania) Xhelal Terziqi	Glacis United	Europa Point	4–0 (A)	14 December 2022
(England) Jack Storer	Bruno's Magpies	Glacis United	3–0 (H)	12 February 2023

=== Clean sheets ===
Rank	Player	Club	Clean sheets
1	(Gibraltar) Jaylan Hankins	Bruno's Magpies	7
1	(Gibraltar) Dayle Coleing	Lincoln Red Imps	7
3	(Gibraltar) Bradley Banda	Europa	6
4	(Spain) Borja Valadés	Lions Gibraltar	5
4	(Gibraltar) Bradley Avellano	Lynx	5
6	(Gibraltar) Jordan Perez	Lynx (Note: Includes one clean sheet for Mons Calpe)	4
6	(Scotland) Alan Martin	St Joseph's	4
8	(Gibraltar) Christian Lopez	Europa	3
8	(Spain) Fernando Canto	Manchester 62	3
10	(Spain) Daniel Tudela	Europa Point	2
10	(Netherlands) Quinn Johnson	Glacis United	2
10	(Spain) Nauzet Santana	Lincoln Red Imps	2
10	(Argentina) Christian Fraiz	Mons Calpe	2

== See also ==
- 2022–23 Gibraltar Intermediate League
- 2022–23 Gibraltar Women's Football League
