= 2020 Rock Cup =

Football tournament season

Tournament details
- Country: Gibraltar
- Dates: 14 February – 8 March 2020
- Teams: 13

Final positions
- Champions: No champion (abandoned)

Tournament statistics
- Matches played: 9
- Goals scored: 54 (6 per match)
- Top goal scorer(s): Sunday Emmanuel (7 goals)

The 2020 Gibtelecom Rock Cup was a single-leg knockout tournament contested by clubs from Gibraltar. There were thirteen clubs participating in the cup this season. The winner of the competition would have qualified to compete in the 2020–21 Europa League.

Europa were the defending champions after defeating Gibraltar United by a score of 3–0 in the previous season's final.

On 1 May 2020, the Gibraltar Football Association announced that the domestic football season had been terminated.

== First round ==
The draw for the first round was held on 10 January 2020. 9 Gibraltar National League sides will enter at this stage along with Hound Dogs, who are competing in the 2019–20 Gibraltar Intermediate League. Three sides (St Joseph's, Lions Gibraltar and Boca Gibraltar) received byes to the second round.

14 February 2020	Hound Dogs	0–10	Europa Point	Gibraltar
20:30		Report	Moody 16', 78'; El Yettefti 25'; Dillon 32', 34', 81'; Collins 37'; Corner 54', 58', 82'	Stadium: Victoria Stadium

15 February 2020	Europa	12–0	Glacis United	Gibraltar
16:00	Avilés 14'; Willy 22', 40'; Velasco 27'; Labra 30', 55', 70', 78'; Olivero 37'; A. Gallardo 46', 74', 82'	Report		Stadium: Victoria Stadium

15 February 2020	Lincoln Red Imps	15–0	College 1975	Gibraltar
18:15	Emmanuel 2', 27', 38', 54', 78', 81', 90'; K. Casciaro 6', 62'; Lopes 11'; Del Rio 30'; Matto 47' (o.g.); J. Coombes 56'; Pibe 63', 71'	Report		Stadium: Victoria Stadium

16 February 2020	Manchester 62	1–2	Mons Calpe	Gibraltar
16:00	Ballantine 15'	Report	D. Díaz 28', 55'	Stadium: Victoria Stadium

16 February 2020	Lynx	0–1	Bruno's Magpies	Gibraltar
18:15		Report	Vinet 60'	Stadium: Victoria Stadium

== Quarter–finals ==
The draw for the quarter–finals was held on 21 February 2020.

6 March 2020	Mons Calpe	3–1	Europa Point	Gibraltar
20:30	D. Díaz 8'; Dos Santos 10'; Vermeeren 55' (o.g.)	Report	Vera 50'	Stadium: Victoria Stadium

7 March 2020	St Joseph's	1–0	Bruno's Magpies	Gibraltar
16:00	Juanfri 57' (pen.)	Report		Stadium: Victoria Stadium

7 March 2020	Europa	2–0	Lions Gibraltar	Gibraltar
18:15	Velasco 38'; Dimas 58'	Report		Stadium: Victoria Stadium

8 March 2020	Lincoln Red Imps	6–0	Boca Gibraltar	Gibraltar
16:00	Pibe 4', 33'; J. Coombes 37'; Oliver 56'; Gato 74'; Álvarez 80'	Report		Stadium: Victoria Stadium

== Semi-finals ==
Cancelled.

== Final ==
Cancelled.

== Scorers ==
As of 8 March 2020.

7 goals

- (Nigeria) Sunday Emmanuel (Lincoln Red Imps)

4 goals

- (Spain) Labra (Europa)
- (Argentina) Pibe (Lincoln Red Imps)

3 goals

- (Spain) Adrián Gallardo (Europa)
- (Sweden) Lukas Corner (Europa Point)
- (Republic of Ireland) Dean Dillon (Europa Point)
- (Argentina) Diego Díaz (Mons Calpe)

2 goals

- (Spain) Willy (Europa)
- (Spain) Fernando Velasco (Europa)
- (United States) Joshua Moody (Europa Point)
- (Gibraltar) Kyle Casciaro (Lincoln Red Imps)
- (Gibraltar) Jamie Coombes (Lincoln Red Imps)

1 goal

- (Gibraltar) Jaron Vinet (Bruno's Magpies)
- (Spain) Alejandro Avilés (Europa)
- (Spain) Manu Dimas (Europa)
- (Gibraltar) Jayce Olivero (Europa)
- (Republic of Ireland) Cian Collins (Europa Point)
- (Gibraltar) Omar El Yettefti (Europa Point)
- (Spain) Diego Vera (Europa Point)
- (Spain) Blas Álvarez (Lincoln Red Imps)
- (Gibraltar) Julian Del Rio (Lincoln Red Imps)
- (Spain) Gato (Lincoln Red Imps)
- (Portugal) Bernardo Lopes (Lincoln Red Imps)
- (Spain) Álvaro Oliver (Lincoln Red Imps)
- (Gibraltar) Scott Ballantine (Manchester 62)
- (Brazil) André Dos Santos (Mons Calpe)
- (Spain) Juanfri (St Joseph's)

Own goals

- (Gibraltar) Jemar Matto (College 1975) vs Lincoln Red Imps
- (Netherlands) Samuel Vermeeren (Europa Point) vs Mons Calpe

== See also ==
- 2019–20 Gibraltar National League
- 2019–20 Gibraltar Intermediate League
