= 2018–19 Gibraltar Premier Division =

Premier Division
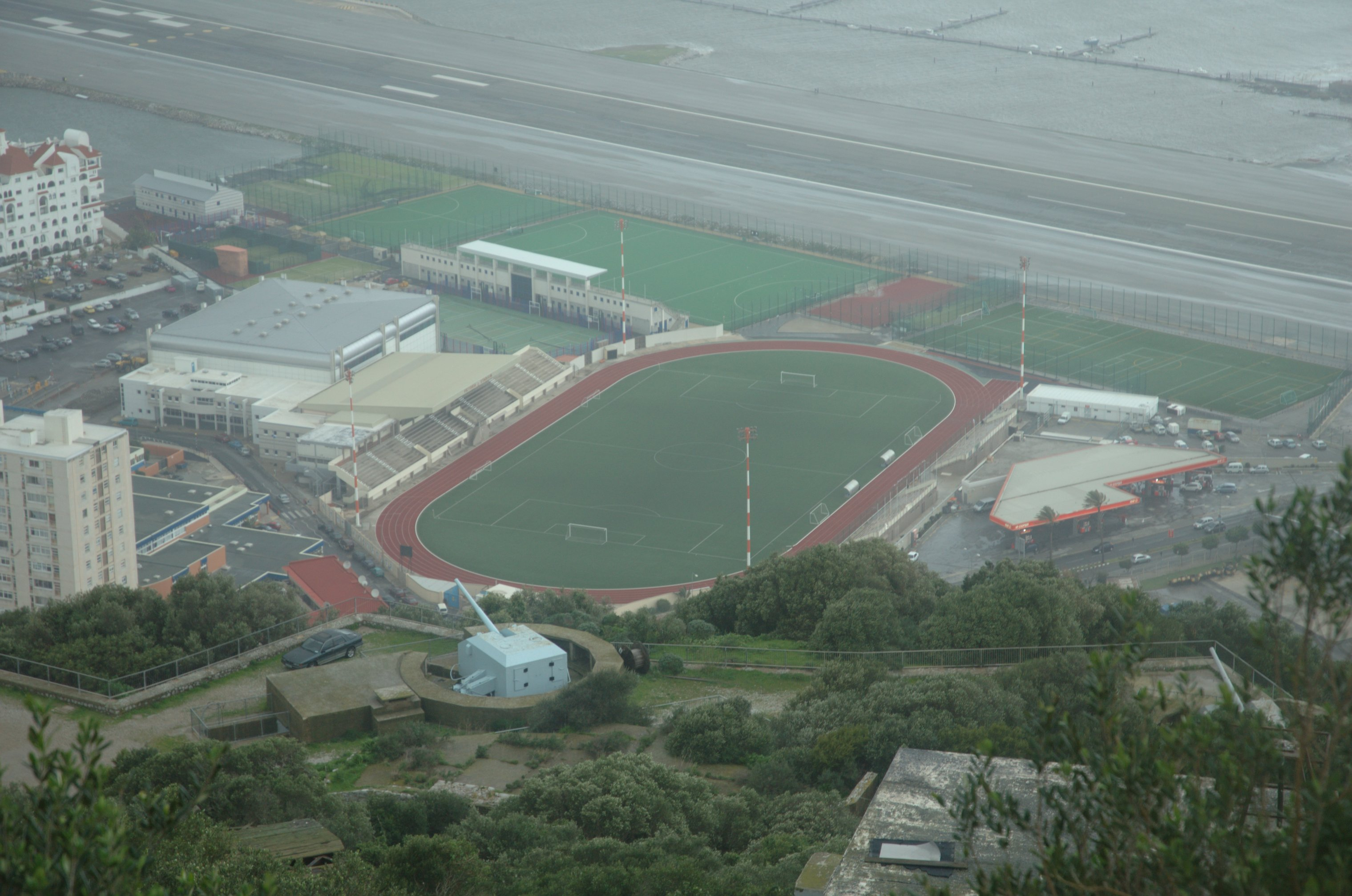
- The Victoria Stadium where each match was played
- Season: 2018–19
- Dates: 13 August 2018 – 20 May 2019
- Champions: Lincoln Red Imps (24th title)
- Champions League: Lincoln Red Imps
- Europa League: Europa; St Joseph's
- Matches: 135
- Goals: 477 (3.53 per match)
- Top goalscorer: Boro (21 goals)
- Best goalkeeper: Jamie Robba; Javi Muñoz (9 clean sheets)
- Biggest home win: Europa 13–1 Boca Gibraltar (18 May 2019)
- Biggest away win: Boca Gibraltar 0–11 Lincoln Red Imps (2 February 2019)
- Highest scoring: Europa 13–1 Boca Gibraltar (18 May 2019)
- Longest winning run: 9 matches Lincoln Red Imps
- Longest unbeaten run: 16 matches Europa
- Longest winless run: 19 matches Boca Gibraltar
- Longest losing run: 16 matches Boca Gibraltar
- All statistics correct as of 20 May 2019.

The 2018–19 Gibraltar Premier Division was the 120th season of the top-tier state football league in Gibraltar, as well as the sixth season since the Gibraltar Football Association joined UEFA in 2013. The league was contested by ten clubs, and began on 13 August 2018.

Lincoln Red Imps were the reigning champions, having won their 23rd title the previous season. They competed in the UEFA Champions League qualifiers, while Europa and St Joseph's contested the UEFA Europa League qualifiers. The season was marred by revelations of betting rules violations by a host of players and coaches at a number of clubs.

== Format ==
The ten Premier Division clubs played each other three times for a total of 27 matches each. The tenth-placed team in the league would be relegated and the ninth-placed team in the league would enter a playoff with the second-placed team from the Second Division for a place in the 2019–20 Premier Division.

The champions earned a place in the preliminary round of the 2019–20 Champions League, and the second–placed club earned a place in the preliminary round of the 2019–20 Europa League. This season also saw the expansion of the Home Grown Player Rule to require all teams to have a minimum of three Gibraltarian players on the field of play at all times, as well as introducing a maximum registered squad size of 25 players. However, the introduction of the Gibraltar Intermediate League allows them to register a reserve squad of 18 players, of which 13 must be Gibraltarian.

=== Violations of betting rules ===
Starting in November, the Gibraltar FA began issuing a number of bans following an in-depth investigation of suspected betting rule violations by players and coaches. At first, several Europa players, including Rubo Blanco, Iván Moya and manager Juan José Gallardo, were banned Following this, Lincoln Red Imps manager Yiyi Pérez was also suspended In March 2019, Lions Gibraltar and Gibraltar Phoenix players including Rafael Bado and Juan Manuel Llaves received bans. On 12 April 4 further players from Boca Gibraltar, Gibraltar United and Manchester 62, as well as former St Joseph's and Glacis United manager Alfonso Cortijo, received bans.

== Teams ==
Location of the stadium where all teams play

At the conclusion of the previous season, Manchester 62 were relegated. Boca Gibraltar took their place, having won the Second Division title and earning promotion for the first time in their history.

Lynx finished 9th the previous season, leaving them to face the runners up in the Second Division, FC Olympique 13, in a play-off. Lynx won the play-off 2–0 on 8 June 2018 to secure their status in the Premier Division.

Note: Flags indicate national team as has been defined under FIFA eligibility rules. Players may hold more than one non-FIFA nationality.

Team	Manager	Captain	Kit manufacturer	Club sponsor	2017–18
Boca Gibraltar	(Gibraltar) Allen Bula	(Gibraltar) Felix Formica-Corsi	ES	Coral	D2, 1st
Europa	(Spain) Rafa Escobar	(Gibraltar) Liam Walker	Jako	La Parrilla; Betfred	2nd
Gibraltar Phoenix	(Spain) Juan Maria Sánchez	(Spain) Ñito Jiménez	Luanvi	Viajes LineaSol	6th
Gibraltar United	(Spain) Paco Luna	(Gibraltar) Kyle Goldwin	Kappa	Quantocoin	4th
Glacis United	(Argentina) Jesús Napolitano	(Spain) Nacho Fernández	Nike		7th
Lincoln Red Imps	(Spain) Víctor Afonso	(Gibraltar) Roy Chipolina	Joma	Mansion.com	1st
Lions Gibraltar	(Spain) Albert Ferri	(Spain) Alberto Caravaca	Givova		8th
Lynx	(Spain) Carlos Gobantes	(Argentina) Gabriel González	Silver Sport	Verralls	9th
Mons Calpe	(Argentina) Luis Manuel Blanco	(Argentina) Federico Villar	Givova	Tokamóvil	5th
St Joseph's	(Spain) Raúl Procopio Baizán	(Spain) Boro	Joma		3rd

- Ñito Jiménez replaced Blas Álvarez as Gibraltar Phoenix captain after the latter was banned by the GFA for the remainder of the season, while Alberto Caravaca replaced Kalian Perez as Lions Gibraltar captain after Perez was banned for 16 months.

=== Managerial changes ===
Team	Outgoing manager	Manner of departure	Date of vacancy	Position in table	Incoming manager	Date of appointment
Gibraltar Phoenix	(Spain) Albert Ferri	Mutual consent	8 June 2018	Pre-season	(Spain) Juan Maria Sánchez	15 June 2018
Glacis United	(Spain) Mariano Marcos Garcia	Signed by CD San Roque	8 June 2018	Pre-season	(Netherlands) Theo Vonk	26 June 2018
Lions Gibraltar	(Gibraltar) Rafael Bado	Mutual consent	29 June 2018	Pre-season	(Spain) Albert Ferri	29 June 2018
Gibraltar United	(Spain) Manolo Nuñez Sánchez	Resigned	13 July 2018	Pre-season	(Spain) Lucas Cazorla	14 July 2018
Glacis United	(Netherlands) Theo Vonk	Resigned	9 August 2018	Pre-season	(Spain) Alfonso Cortijo	10 August 2018
Lincoln Red Imps	(Spain) Yiyi Perez	Suspended	8 November 2018	2nd	(Spain) Manolo Nuñez Sánchez	8 November 2018
Glacis United	(Spain) Alfonso Cortijo	Resigned	9 November 2018	7th	(Argentina) Jesús Napolitano	December 2018
Europa	(Spain) Juanjo Gallardo	Suspended	23 November 2018	1st	(Spain) Miguel Ángel Rodríguez	23 November 2018
Lincoln Red Imps	(Spain) Manolo Nuñez Sánchez	Resigned	12 December 2018	2nd	(Spain) Víctor Afonso	13 December 2018
Boca Gibraltar	(Spain) Juanjo Pomares	Resigned	18 December 2018	9th	(Gibraltar) Allen Bula	19 December 2018
Gibraltar United	(Spain) Lucas Cazorla	Sacked	6 January 2019	4th	(Spain) Paco Luna	7 January 2019
Europa	(Spain) Miguel Ángel Rodríguez	Mutual consent	5 February 2019	2nd	(Spain) Rafa Escobar	6 February 2019

== League table ==
Pos	Team	Pld	W	D	L	GF	GA	GD	Pts	Qualification or relegation
1	Lincoln Red Imps (C)	27	21	3	3	84	19	+65	66	Qualification for the Champions League preliminary round
2	Europa FC	27	20	4	3	84	20	+64	64	Qualification for the Europa League preliminary round
3	St Joseph's	27	17	4	6	69	29	+40	55	Qualification for the Europa League preliminary round
4	Mons Calpe	27	15	4	8	63	29	+34	49	
5	Gibraltar Phoenix	27	13	4	10	42	34	+8	43	
6	Gibraltar United	27	11	6	10	48	37	+11	39	
7	Lynx	27	8	7	12	29	45	−16	31	
8	Glacis United	27	7	3	17	28	58	−30	24	
9	Lions Gibraltar	27	3	0	24	17	77	−60	9	
10	Boca Gibraltar	27	2	1	24	13	129	−116	7	

Source: UEFA, Soccerway
Rules for classification: 1) Points; 2) Goal difference; 3) Goals scored.
(C) Champions

== Results ==
=== Matches 1–18 ===
Home \ Away	BOC	EFC	GPH	GIB	GLA	LIN	LGI	LYN	MCA	SJO
Boca Gibraltar		0–9	2–5	0–4	0–2	0–11	1–0	0–3	0–3	1–1
Europa FC	3–0		2–0	1–0	1–0	1–1	5–1	4–0	2–1	2–3
Gibraltar Phoenix	3–1	0–1		2–1	6–0	0–2	1–0	2–0	1–0	1–2
Gibraltar United	2–1	1–3	1–1		2–1	1–5	4–0	4–1	2–1	0–1
Glacis United	6–1	0–0	1–3	0–2		1–2	3–1	0–0	2–3	0–2
Lincoln Red Imps	3–0	3–2	4–0	0–1	4–0		3–0	1–0	3–1	1–3
Lions Gibraltar	2–1	0–2	1–3	1–0	0–1	0–2		0–3	0–4	0–7
Lynx	0–1	1–1	0–0	2–2	2–1	1–1	1–0		0–3	2–3
Mons Calpe	3–0	1–2	3–0	1–1	0–1	2–2	3–0	1–1		2–1
St Joseph's	5–0	0–1	0–0	2–2	8–0	0–5	3–1	7–1	1–2	

Source: Gibraltar Football Association, UEFA
Legend: Blue = home team win; Yellow = draw; Red = away team win.

=== Matches 19–27 ===
Home \ Away	BOC	EFC	GPH	GIB	GLA	LIN	LGI	LYN	MCA	SJO
Boca Gibraltar			0–8		2–3		0–7		0–5	
Europa FC	13–1		3–0					5–0	4–3	2–0
Gibraltar Phoenix				2–0		0–3	1–0		0–2	
Gibraltar United	7–0	1–1			2–0		4–1	1–1		
Glacis United		1–6	1–1					0–2		0–1
Lincoln Red Imps	10–0	2–0		2–0	2–1		5–1			
Lions Gibraltar		0–8			1–2			0–3		0–1
Lynx	1–0		1–2			1–4			2–1	0–1
Mons Calpe				5–2	4–1	2–0	6–0			
St Joseph's	10–1		3–0	2–1		1–3			1–1	

Source: Gibraltar Football Association, UEFA
Legend: Blue = home team win; Yellow = draw; Red = away team win.

== Season statistics ==
=== Scoring ===
As of 19 May 2019

==== Top scorers ====
Rank	Player	Club	Goals
1	(Spain) Boro	St Joseph's	21
2	(Spain) Juanfri	St Joseph's	20
3	(Argentina) Pibe	Mons Calpe	18
4	(Argentina) Leonardo Carboni	Mons Calpe	16
5	(Gibraltar) Tjay De Barr	Europa	14
6	(Spain) Urko Arroyo	Europa	12
6	(Gibraltar) Liam Walker	Europa	12
8	(Gibraltar) Joseph Chipolina	Lincoln Red Imps	11
8	(Spain) Labra	Gibraltar Phoenix	11
10	(Spain) Manuel Arana	Europa	10
10	(Spain) Héctor Figueroa	Lincoln Red Imps	10
10	(Spain) Raúl Segura	Gibraltar Phoenix	10

==== Hat-tricks ====
Player	For	Against	Result	Date
(Gibraltar) Joseph Chipolina	Lincoln Red Imps	Lions Gibraltar	3–0 (H)	24 August 2018
(Spain) Boro^{4}	St Joseph's	Lynx	7–1 (H)	11 December 2018
(Spain) Giovanni	Lincoln Red Imps	Gibraltar United	5–1 (A)	17 January 2019
(Argentina) Pibe	Mons Calpe	Lions Gibraltar	4–0 (A)	18 January 2019
(Spain) Juan Manuel Llaves	Gibraltar Phoenix	Glacis United	6–0 (H)	19 January 2019
(Gibraltar) Anthony Hernandez	Lincoln Red Imps	Boca Gibraltar	11–0 (A)	2 February 2019
(Philippines) Kike Gómez	Lincoln Red Imps	Boca Gibraltar	11–0 (A)	2 February 2019
(Spain) Boro	St Joseph's	Glacis United	8–0 (H)	2 February 2019
(Spain) Juanfri	St Joseph's	Boca Gibraltar	10–1 (H)	28 February 2019
(Spain) José Luis Reyes	St Joseph's	Boca Gibraltar	10–1 (H)	28 February 2019
(Argentina) Leonardo Carboni	Mons Calpe	Boca Gibraltar	5–0 (A)	9 March 2019
(Spain) Alberto Zapata	Gibraltar United	Boca Gibraltar	7–0 (H)	30 March 2019
(Argentina) Pibe	Mons Calpe	Lions Gibraltar	6–0 (H)	15 April 2019
(Spain) Urko Arroyo	Europa	Lynx	5-0 (H)	4 April 2019
(Argentina) Leonardo Carboni	Mons Calpe	Gibraltar United	5-2 (H)	4 May 2019
(Spain) Héctor Figueroa	Lincoln Red Imps	Boca Gibraltar	10–0 (H)	5 May 2019
(Spain) Alberto Caravaca	Lions Gibraltar	Boca Gibraltar	7-0 (A)	11 May 2019
(Gibraltar) Liam Walker^{4}	Europa	Boca Gibraltar	13-1 (H)	18 May 2019
(Spain) Urko Arroyo^{4}	Europa	Boca Gibraltar	13-1 (H)	18 May 2019

==== Clean Sheets ====
Rank	Player	Club	Clean sheets
1	(Spain) Javi Muñoz	Europa	9
1	(Gibraltar) Jamie Robba	St Joseph's	9
3	(Gibraltar) Matt Cafer	Gibraltar Phoenix	8
3	(Spain) Manuel Soler	Lincoln Red Imps	8
3	(Argentina) Marcos Zappacosta	Mons Calpe	8
6	(Gibraltar) Kyle Goldwin	Gibraltar United	7
7	(Spain) Borja	Glacis United	5
8	(Gibraltar) Dayle Coleing	Europa	4
8	(Gibraltar) Jaylan Hankins	Lincoln Red Imps	4
10	(Spain) Álex Caro	Lynx	3
10	(Argentina) Sebastian Andres Lallana	Lynx	3

== Awards ==
=== Monthly awards ===
No league football was played in September 2018 due to the international break and the Gibraltar Music Festival.

Month	Manager of the Month		Player of the Month		Reference
Month	Manager	Club	Player	Club	Reference
August	(Spain) Yiyi Pérez	Lincoln Red Imps	(Gibraltar) Joseph Chipolina	Lincoln Red Imps	
October	(Spain) Juan Maria Sánchez	Gibraltar Phoenix	(Gibraltar) Tjay De Barr	Europa	
November	(Spain) Raúl Procopio Baizán	St Joseph's	(Spain) Juanfri	St Joseph's	
December	(Spain) Raúl Procopio Baizán	St Joseph's	(Spain) Boro	St Joseph's	
January	(Argentina) Luis Manuel Blanco	Mons Calpe	(Argentina) Pibe	Mons Calpe	
February	(Spain) Víctor Afonso	Lincoln Red Imps	(Philippines) Kike Gómez	Lincoln Red Imps	
March	(Spain) Rafa Escobar	Europa	(Spain) Álex Quillo	Europa	
April	(Spain) Víctor Afonso	Lincoln Red Imps	(Spain) Sergio Molina	Lincoln Red Imps	

=== End-of-season awards ===
End of season awards were handed out by Football Gibraltar, the Gibraltar Football Association's official UEFA correspondents, on 28 May and 2 June.

Award	Winner	Club
Manager of the Season	(Spain) Raúl Procopio Baizán	St Joseph's
Goalkeeper of the Season	(Gibraltar) Jamie Robba	St Joseph's
Defender of the Season	(Portugal) Bernardo Lopes	Lincoln Red Imps
Midfielder of the Season	(Ghana) Mustapha Yahaya	Europa
Striker of the Season	(Spain) Boro	St Joseph's
Player of the Season	(Portugal) Bernardo Lopes	Lincoln Red Imps
Young Player of the Season	(Gibraltar) Tjay De Barr	Europa
Fans' Player of the Season	(Portugal) Bernardo Lopes	Lincoln Red Imps
Fans' Young Player of the Season	(Gibraltar) Tjay De Barr	Europa

== See also ==
- 2018–19 Gibraltar Second Division
- 2018–19 Gibraltar Intermediate League
