= 2021–22 Gibraltar National League =

Gibraltar National League
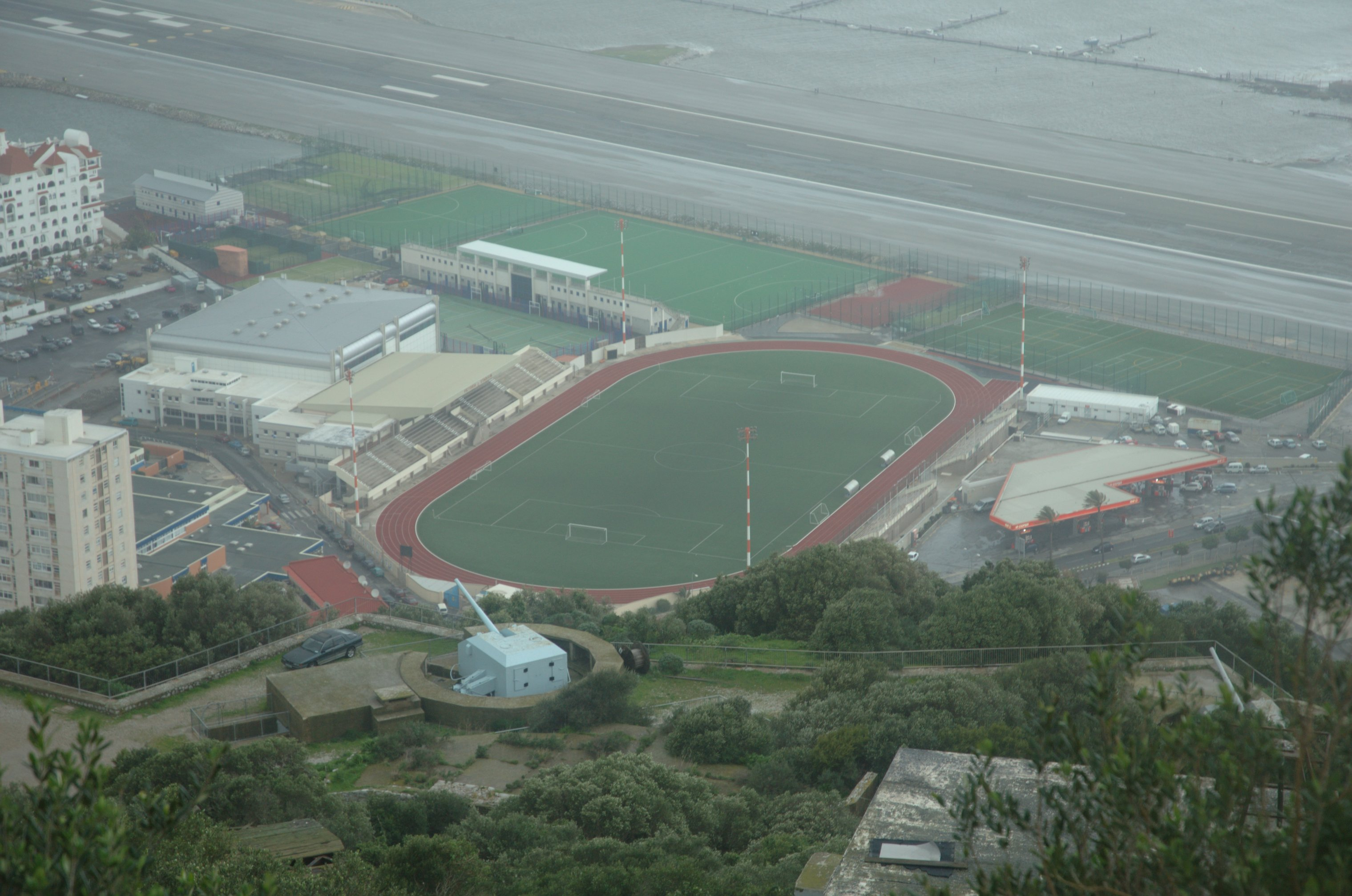
- The Victoria Stadium where the matches were played
- Season: 2021–22
- Dates: 16 October 2021 – 30 April 2022
- Champions: Lincoln Red Imps; 2nd National League title 26th overall
- Champions League: Lincoln Red Imps
- Europa Conference League: Europa; St Joseph's; Bruno's Magpies
- Matches: 105
- Goals: 366 (3.49 per match)
- Top goalscorer: Juanfri (14 goals)
- Best goalkeeper: Alan Martin (8 clean sheets)
- Biggest home win: Bruno's Magpies 5–0 Europa Point (17 October 2021)
- Biggest away win: Europa Point 0–10 Mons Calpe (8 January 2022)
- Highest scoring: Europa Point 0–10 Mons Calpe (8 January 2022)
- All statistics correct as of 5 May 2022.

The 2021–22 Gibraltar National League season was the third season of the Gibraltar National League in Gibraltar, and the 123rd season of football on the territory overall. The league kicked off on 16 October 2021. Lincoln Red Imps were the reigning champions, winning the title on the final day of the 2020–21 season.

== Format ==
The structure of the league was expected to follow that of the previous two seasons. Teams played one round of games as a single league, before splitting into two groups: the Championship Group contested by the top 6 sides, and the Challenge Group between the bottom 5 sides. The winners of the Challenge Group received the GFA Challenge Trophy and a bye to the second round of the next season's Rock Cup.

== Teams ==
Location of the stadium where all teams play

The following 11 teams competed in the 2021–22 season. Boca Gibraltar were expelled from the league in December 2020 and did not return.

Note: Flags indicate national team as has been defined under FIFA eligibility rules. Players may hold more than one non-FIFA nationality.

Team	Manager	Captain	Kit manufacturer	Club sponsor	2020–21
Bruno's Magpies	(England) Nathan Rooney	(Spain) Rubén Díaz	VIVE	Rosso Corsa	7th
College 1975	(Spain) Ángel Espinosa	(Spain) Dani Guerrero	Joma		10th
Europa	(Spain) Arteaga	(Spain) Juampe	Kappa		2nd
Europa Point	(England) Tommy Taylor	(Gibraltar) Aiman Mkerreff	Xtreme Sports China		11th
Glacis United	(Italy) Michele Di Piedi	(Argentina) Marcos Zappacosta	Macron		8th
Lincoln Red Imps	(England) Mick McElwee	(Gibraltar) Roy Chipolina	Givova	Mansion.com	1st
Lions Gibraltar	(Spain) Paco Luna	(Gibraltar) Shea Breakspear	Macron		6th
Lynx	(Gibraltar) Albert Parody	(Gibraltar) Brad Power	Givova	Grupo Casais	5th
Manchester 62	(Scotland) David Wilson	(Gibraltar) Scott Ballantine	Joma	CEPSA GIB	9th
Mons Calpe	(Spain) Leo Fuentes	(Brazil) Andre Dos Santos	Givova	FanPlay 365	4th
St Joseph's	(Spain) Jaime Molina	(Gibraltar) Aymen Mouelhi	Legea		3rd

=== Managerial Changes ===
Team	Outgoing manager	Manner of departure	Date of vacancy	Position in table	Incoming manager	Date of appointment
St Joseph's	(Spain) Raúl Procopio Baizán	Mutual consent	8 June 2021	Pre-season	(Spain) Jaime Molina	30 June 2021
Bruno's Magpies	(Spain) Johnny Parrado	Mutual consent	1 September 2021	Pre-season	(Spain) José Alba Heredia	5 September 2021
Glacis United	(Spain) Javier Sánchez Alfaro	Mutual consent	1 September 2021	Pre-season	(Italy) Michele Di Piedi	1 September 2021
Europa Point	(England) Craig Cowell	Resigned	11 October 2021	Pre-season	(Spain) Paco Luna	11 October 2021
Europa Point	(Spain) Paco Luna	Sacked	8 November 2021	11th	(Gibraltar) Sean Reyes	26 November 2021
Bruno's Magpies	(Spain) José Alba Heredia	Sacked	8 December 2021	6th	(England) Nathan Rooney	13 January 2022
Lions Gibraltar	(Spain) Albert Ferri	Sacked	9 January 2022	11th	(Gibraltar) Adrian Parral (interim)	9 January 2022
Europa Point	(Gibraltar) Sean Reyes	Mutual consent	31 January 2022	10th	(England) Tommy Taylor	18 February 2022
Mons Calpe	(Uruguay) César Vega	Health concerns	4 March 2022	6th	(Spain) Leo Fuentes	4 March 2022
Lions Gibraltar	(Gibraltar) Adrian Parral	End of interim spell	2 March 2022	11th	(Spain) Paco Luna	2 March 2022
Europa	(Spain) Rafa Escobar	Sacked	29 March 2022	2nd	(Spain) Arteaga	29 March 2022

== League table ==
Pos	Team	Pld	W	D	L	GF	GA	GD	Pts	Qualification or relegation (Note: Teams play each other once (10 matches), before the league splits into two groups (the top six and the bottom five) for the last 10 respectively 8 matches.)
1	Lincoln Red Imps	10	10	0	0	40	5	+35	30	Qualification for the Championship Group
2	Europa	10	9	0	1	36	7	+29	27	Qualification for the Championship Group
3	St Joseph's	10	7	1	2	25	9	+16	22	Qualification for the Championship Group
4	Glacis United	10	6	1	3	26	14	+12	19	Qualification for the Championship Group
5	Mons Calpe	10	5	1	4	25	13	+12	16	Qualification for the Championship Group
6	Bruno's Magpies	10	4	2	4	18	15	+3	14	Qualification for the Championship Group
7	Manchester 62	10	4	1	5	11	21	−10	13	Qualification for the Challenge Group
8	Lynx	10	3	1	6	15	25	−10	10	Qualification for the Challenge Group
9	College 1975	10	2	0	8	5	21	−16	6	Qualification for the Challenge Group
10	Europa Point	10	1	0	9	8	49	−41	3	Qualification for the Challenge Group
11	Lions Gibraltar	10	0	1	9	6	36	−30	1	Qualification for the Challenge Group

Source: Soccerway
Rules for classification: 1) Points; 2) Head-to-head points; 3) Head-to-head goal difference; 4) Fair Play

== Results ==
Home \ Away	BRU	COL	EFC	EPO	GLA	LIN	LGI	LYN	MAN	MON	SJO
Bruno's Magpies				5–0	2–3			0–1	4–0		0–0
College 1975	0–2			2–1	0–2			0–2			0–3
Europa	3–1	2–0			2–1			4–0			4–1
Europa Point			0–6			1–5	3–2		1–2	0–10	
Glacis United				5–0		2–4		3–1	1–1	1–0	
Lincoln Red Imps	5–0	4–0	3–1				1–0			3–0	
Lions Gibraltar	2–3	0–3 (Note: Lions Gibraltar vs College 1975 initially finished 1–0, however the result was overturned and awarded 0–3 to College 1975 after Lions violated substitution rules.)	0–9		0–7						1–2
Lynx				6–2		1–7	0–0		1–2	2–3	
Manchester 62		2–0	0–2			0–7	3–0			0–2	
Mons Calpe	1–1	3–0	1–3				5–1				0–2
St Joseph's				6–0	4–1	0–1		4–1	3–1		

Source: Soccerway
Legend: Blue = home team win; Yellow = draw; Red = away team win.

== Championship and Challenge groups ==
=== Championship Group ===
Pos	Team	Pld	W	D	L	GF	GA	GD	Pts	Qualification or relegation
1	Lincoln Red Imps (C)	20	19	1	0	65	17	+48	58	Qualification for the Champions League first qualifying round
2	Europa	20	15	2	3	57	21	+36	47	Qualification for the Europa Conference League first qualifying round
3	St Joseph's	20	11	2	7	45	27	+18	35	Qualification for the Europa Conference League first qualifying round
4	Bruno's Magpies	20	10	3	7	36	25	+11	33	Qualification for the Europa Conference League first qualifying round
5	Glacis United	20	7	1	12	32	36	−4	22	
6	Mons Calpe (Note: Mons Calpe will be banned for 1 season from all UEFA club competitions for the 2022–23 season by the UEFA Club Financial Control Body on 11 March 2022 due to breaches of the UEFA Financial Fair Play Regulations.)	20	6	2	12	34	36	−2	20	

Source: Soccerway
Rules for classification: 1) Points; 2) Head-to-head points; 3) Head-to-head goal difference; 4) Fair Play
(C) Champions

=== Championship Group results ===
Home \ Away	BRU	EFC	GLA	LIN	MON	SJO
Bruno's Magpies		1–1	3–0	2–4	1–0	1–0
Europa	3–1		1–0	0–2	3–2	2–3
Glacis United	0–3	1–2		1–3	1–0	2–5
Lincoln Red Imps	1–0	3–3	1–0		4–2	3–2
Mons Calpe	0–3	0–4	2–0	1–2		1–4
St Joseph's	1–3	1–2	2–1	1–2	1–1	

Source: Soccerway
Legend: Blue = home team win; Yellow = draw; Red = away team win.

=== Challenge Group ===
Pos	Team	Pld	W	D	L	GF	GA	GD	Pts	Qualification
1	Manchester 62	18	7	5	6	25	28	−3	26	GFA Challenge Trophy and bye in 2022–23 Rock Cup
2	College 1975	18	6	2	10	17	28	−11	20	
3	Lynx	18	6	1	11	25	38	−13	19	
4	Europa Point	18	4	2	12	17	65	−48	14	
5	Lions Gibraltar	18	1	5	12	13	45	−32	8	

Source: Soccerway
Rules for classification: 1) Points; 2) Head-to-head points; 3) Head-to-head goal difference; 4) Fair Play

=== Challenge Group results ===
Home \ Away	COL	EPO	LGI	LYN	MAN
College 1975		5–1	1–0	1–0	1–1
Europa Point	2–1		1–1	0–3	0–4
Lions Gibraltar	1–1	0–1		4–2	0–0
Lynx	0–2	0–2	2–0		1–4
Manchester 62	2–0	2–2	1–1	0–2	

Source: Soccerway
Legend: Blue = home team win; Yellow = draw; Red = away team win.

== Season statistics ==
As of 25 April 2022

=== Scoring ===
==== Top scorers ====
Rank	Player	Club	Goals
1	(Spain) Juanfri	St Joseph's	14
2	(Spain) Antonio Pino	Europa	12
3	(Philippines) Kike Gómez	Lincoln Red Imps	11
4	(Gibraltar) Liam Walker	Lincoln Red Imps	10
5	(Spain) Juampe	Europa	9
5	(Gibraltar) John-Paul Duarte	Mons Calpe	9
7	(Spain) Adrián Gallardo	Europa	7
7	(Italy) Stefano Borghi	Glacis United	7
7	(Spain) Javi Moreno	Mons Calpe	7
7	(Spain) Boro	St Joseph's	7

==== Hat-tricks ====
Player	For	Against	Result	Date
(Spain) Javi Casares	Bruno's Magpies	Europa Point	5–0 (H)	17 October 2021
(Spain) Antonio Pino	Europa	Lions Gibraltar	9–0 (A)	17 December 2021
(Gibraltar) Ayoub El Hmidi^{5}	Mons Calpe	Europa Point	10–0 (A)	8 January 2022
(Philippines) Kike Gómez^{4}	Lincoln Red Imps	Europa Point	5–1 (A)	22 January 2022
(Gibraltar) Jaiden Bartolo	Manchester 62	Lynx	4–1 (A)	5 March 2022

==== Clean Sheets ====
Rank	Player	Club	Clean sheets
1	(Scotland) Alan Martin	Bruno's Magpies	8
2	(Gibraltar) Christian Lopez	Europa	6
3	(Gibraltar) Jamie Robba	St Joseph's	4
3	(Spain) Edu Oliva	College 1975	4
5	(Argentina) Marcos Zappacosta	Glacis United	3
5	(Spain) Christian Arco	Lincoln Red Imps	3
5	(Gibraltar) Dayle Coleing	Lincoln Red Imps	3
5	(Spain) Borja Valadés	Lions Gibraltar	3
5	(Gibraltar) Bradley Avellano	Lynx	3
5	(England) Adam Stevens	Manchester 62	3
5	(Argentina) Christian Fraiz	Mons Calpe	3
5	(Gibraltar) Jordan Perez	Glacis United	3

== See also ==
- 2021–22 Gibraltar Intermediate League
- 2021–22 Gibraltar Women's Football League
