= 2019–20 Gibraltar Intermediate League =

Gibraltar Intermediate League
- Season: 2019–20
- Dates: 18 August 2019 – 13 March 2020
- Champions: Lincoln Red Imps Intermediate (2nd title)
- Matches: 68
- Goals: 384 (5.65 per match)
- Top goalscorer: (Gibraltar) Luke Bautista (14 goals)
- Best goalkeeper: (Gibraltar) Elijah Robles (Gibraltar) Bradley Avellano (Gibraltar) John Paul Hernandez (4 clean sheets)
- All statistics correct as of 4 March 2020.

The 2019–20 Gibraltar Intermediate League is the second season of under-23 football in Gibraltar, after reforms to reserve team football in June 2018. The league will be contested by 10 teams - nine under-23 sides plus Hound Dogs, and began on 18 August 2019.

As a result of the COVID-19 pandemic, the Gibraltar FA decided to end the season after 16 games on 13 March 2020. As Lincoln Red Imps Intermediate couldn't be caught by that point, the league title was awarded to the Red Imps.

== Format ==
The Gibraltar Intermediate League was established by the Gibraltar Football Association in June 2018 as a merger of the pre-existing Reserves Division and Under 18 Division, in order to aid player development on the territory. Competing clubs are required to register a reserve squad of 18 players, of which 13 must be Gibraltarian.

== Teams ==
Location of the stadium where all teams play

Following the dissolution of Gibraltar Phoenix and Gibraltar United, along with St Joseph's opting not to return to the league following their withdrawal half-way through the previous season, Bruno's Magpies and College 1975 entered intermediate sides for the first time. Due to the lack of resources necessary to compete in the new Gibraltar National League, Hound Dogs were granted special permission by the Gibraltar FA to participate as a senior side in the Intermediate League.

Note: Flags indicate national team as has been defined under FIFA eligibility rules. Players may hold more than one non-FIFA nationality.

Team	Manager	Captain	Kit manufacturer	Club sponsor
Bruno's Magpies Intermediate	(Gibraltar) Garry Turner-Bone	(Gibraltar) John-Paul Duarte	Nike	GVC Holdings; Chestertons
College 1975 Intermediate	(Spain) Jesús Infante Manzorro	(Gibraltar) Zayne Da Costa	Joma	
Europa Intermediate	(Spain) Bermejo Celso	(Gibraltar) Stefan Moreno	Kappa	La Parrilla; Betfred
Glacis United Intermediate	(Gibraltar) William Marsh	(Gibraltar) Daniel Pratts	Nike	
Hound Dogs	(Gibraltar) Chris Gomez	(Gibraltar) Ivan Borg	Joma	The Calpe Hounds
Lincoln Red Imps Intermediate	(Gibraltar) Malcolm Martin	(Gibraltar) Ethan Thorne-Llambias	adidas	Mansion
Lions Gibraltar Intermediate	(Spain) Albert Ferri	(Gibraltar) James Parkinson	Givova	
Lynx Intermediate	(Gibraltar) Jeky Buhagiar	(Gibraltar) Javan Parody	Givova	Verralls
Manchester 62 Intermediate	(Gibraltar) Luis McCoy	(Gibraltar) Peter Sardeña	Joma	CEPSA GIB
Mons Calpe Intermediate	(Spain) Carlos Gobantes	(Gibraltar) Daniel Segui	Givova	Tokamóvil

== League table ==
Pos	Team	Pld	W	D	L	GF	GA	GD	Pts
1	Lincoln Red Imps Intermediate (C)	16	15	1	0	63	12	+51	46
2	Lynx Intermediate	16	12	0	4	54	28	+26	36
3	Manchester 62 Intermediate	16	9	3	4	40	23	+17	30
4	Europa Intermediate	16	9	2	5	54	36	+18	29
5	Glacis United Intermediate	16	8	3	5	54	24	+30	27
6	Lions Gibraltar Intermediate	16	5	1	10	22	32	−10	16
7	College 1975 Intermediate	16	4	3	9	22	52	−30	15
8	Bruno's Magpies Intermediate	16	4	1	11	36	63	−27	13
9	Hound Dogs	16	3	2	11	17	53	−36	11
10	Mons Calpe Intermediate	16	2	2	12	20	64	−44	8

Source: Gibraltar FA
Rules for classification: 1) Points; 2) Goal difference; 3) Goals scored.
(C) Champions

== Season statistics ==
=== Scoring ===
As of 4 March 2020

==== Top scorers ====
Rank	Player	Club	Goals
1	(Gibraltar) Luke Bautista	Europa Intermediate	14
2	(Gibraltar) Zayne Da Costa	College 1975 Intermediate	13
2	(Gibraltar) Julian Del Rio	Lincoln Red Imps Intermediate	13
2	(Gibraltar) Michael Ruiz (Note: Includes 8 goals for Glacis United Intermediate.)	Lynx Intermediate	13
5	(Gibraltar) Shay Jones	Lincoln Red Imps Intermediate	11
5	(Gibraltar) Leone Seatory	Lynx Intermediate	11
7	(Gibraltar) Jayan Brennan	Europa Intermediate	10
7	(Gibraltar) Brendan Ramagge	Lions Gibraltar Intermediate	10
9	(Gibraltar) Jaron Vinet (Note: Includes 8 goals for Mons Calpe Intermediate.)	Bruno's Magpies Intermediate	8
9	(Gibraltar) Julian Lopez	Glacis United Intermediate	8

==== Hat-tricks ====
Player	For	Against	Result	Date
(Gibraltar) Julian Del Rio	Lincoln Red Imps Intermediate	Bruno's Magpies Intermediate	6–1 (A)	18 August 2019
(Gibraltar) Shay Jones	Lincoln Red Imps Intermediate	Hound Dogs	4–0 (A)	23 September 2019
(Gibraltar) Stefan Thorne	Bruno's Magpies Intermediate	Lions Gibraltar Intermediate	5–2 (A)	24 September 2019
(Gibraltar) Mikey Yome	Europa Intermediate	Mons Calpe Intermediate	10–0 (H)	3 October 2019
(Gibraltar) Robert Montovio	Manchester 62 Intermediate	Bruno's Magpies Intermediate	8–2 (A)	6 October 2019
(Gibraltar) Julian Lopez^{4}	Glacis United Intermediate	Bruno's Magpies Intermediate	9–1 (H)	22 October 2019
(Scotland) Ronan Kearney^{4}	Bruno's Magpies Intermediate	Hound Dogs	5–2 (H)	7 November 2019
(Gibraltar) Zayne Da Costa^{4}	College 1975 Intermediate	Manchester 62 Intermediate	4–4 (H)	10 November 2019
(Gibraltar) Jaron Vinet	Mons Calpe Intermediate	Hound Dogs	6–2 (H)	2 December 2019
(Gibraltar) Leone Seatory	Lynx Intermediate	Mons Calpe Intermediate	10–1 (H)	13 January 2020
(Western Sahara) Sidi Mahamoud	Glacis United Intermediate	Hound Dogs	7–0 (A)	1 February 2020
(Gibraltar) Julian Del Rio	Lincoln Red Imps Intermediate	Lynx Intermediate	5–0 (A)	11 February 2020
(Western Sahara) Sidi Mahamoud	Glacis United Intermediate	Mons Calpe Intermediate	6–0 (H)	4 March 2020

==== Clean Sheets ====
Rank	Player	Club	Clean sheets
1	(Gibraltar) Elijah Robles	Lincoln Red Imps Intermediate	4
1	(Gibraltar) Bradley Avellano	Lincoln Red Imps Intermediate	4
1	(Gibraltar) John-Paul Hernandez	Lions Gibraltar Intermediate	4
4	(Gibraltar) Kaydon Migge	College 1975 Intermediate	3
4	(Gibraltar) Christian Lopez (Note: Includes 2 clean sheets for Manchester 62 Intermediate.)	Europa Intermediate	3
4	(Gibraltar) Ivan Moreno	Glacis United Intermediate	3
4	(Gibraltar) Lewis Ian Victor	Lions Gibraltar Intermediate	3
4	(Gibraltar) Sean Benitez	Manchester 62 Intermediate	3
9	(Gibraltar) Denzel Navarro	Glacis United Intermediate	2
9	(Gibraltar) Bradley Banda	Lynx Intermediate	2
9	(Gibraltar) Mikey Borge	Manchester 62 Intermediate	2
9	(Japan) Takumi Tomizawa	Manchester 62 Intermediate	2
9	(Gibraltar) Jamie Carlin	Mons Calpe Intermediate	2

== See also ==
- 2019–20 Gibraltar National League
