= 2012–13 Gibraltar Premier Division =

Premier Division
- Season: 2012–13
- Champions: Lincoln
- Relegated: None
- Matches played: 45
- Goals scored: 195 (4.33 per match)
- Biggest home win: Lincoln 10–0 Lynx
- Biggest away win: Glacis United 0–7 Lincoln; Glacis United 1–8 Lincoln
- Highest scoring: Lincoln 10–0 Lynx; Lions Gibraltar 4–6 Manchester United

The 2012–13 Gibraltar Premier Division was the 114th season of the national football league in Gibraltar since its establishment - the highest level of football in Gibraltar. It was contested by six clubs - all of which are amateur. The season began on 15 September 2012 and ended on 29 May 2013. Lincoln were the defending champions, and successfully defended their title.

No team was relegated because of an expansion to eight teams next season. Gibraltar's new UEFA membership required the top division of a country to have at least seven participating clubs.

== Participating teams ==
After the 2011–12 season the SJ Athletic Corinthians were relegated and Lynx were promoted from Division 2.

- Glacis United
- Lincoln
- Lions Gibraltar
- Lynx
- St Joseph's
- Manchester United

== League table ==
Pos	Team	Pld	W	D	L	GF	GA	GD	Pts
1	Lincoln (C)	15	13	2	0	68	13	+55	41
2	St Joseph's	15	10	0	5	43	20	+23	30
3	Manchester United	15	7	2	6	22	31	−9	23
4	Lynx	15	4	2	9	18	42	−24	14
5	Lions Gibraltar	15	3	2	10	24	41	−17	11
6	Glacis United	15	3	2	10	20	47	−27	11

Source: 2012–13 Football league of Gibraltar
Rules for classification: 1) points; 2) goal difference; 3) number of goals scored.
(C) Champions

== Results ==
Each team played every other team three times, either twice at home and once away, or once at home and twice away, for a total of 15 matches.

=== Matches 1–5 ===
Home \ Away	GLA	LIN	LGI	LYN	MAN	SJO
Glacis United		0–7	3–3		0–3	2–1
Lincoln			5–3		6–0	2–1
Lions Gibraltar				3–0		1–2
Lynx	2–1	1–5				
Manchester 62			1–0	2–1		
St Joseph's				6–1	4–0	

Source: 2012–13 Football league of Giblartar
Legend: Blue = home team win; Yellow = draw; Red = away team win.

=== Matches 6–10 ===
Home \ Away	GLA	LIN	LGI	LYN	MAN	SJO
Glacis United				4–0		
Lincoln	4–0			10–0		
Lions Gibraltar	3–4	2–3			4–6	
Lynx			0–1			3–5
Manchester 62	2–1	1–5		1–0		0–1
St Joseph's	4–0	0–2	1–0			

Source: 2012–13 Football league of Giblartar
Legend: Blue = home team win; Yellow = draw; Red = away team win.

=== Matches 11–15 ===
Home \ Away	GLA	LIN	LGI	LYN	MAN	SJO
Glacis United		1–8	2–2		0–1	1–4
Lincoln			6–0		1–1	3–2
Lions Gibraltar				0–3		1–5
Lynx	3–1	1–1				
Manchester 62			0–1	1–1		
St Joseph's				1–2	6–3	

Source: 2012–13 Football league of Giblartar
Legend: Blue = home team win; Yellow = draw; Red = away team win.
