= Liam Walker =

Gibraltarian association football player

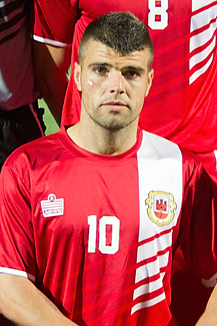
- Walker with Gibraltar in 2014

Personal information
- Full name: Liam Walker
- Date of birth: 13 April 1988 (age 38)
- Place of birth: Gibraltar
- Height: 5 ft 8 in (1.73 m)
- Position: Midfielder

Youth career
- Peña Madridista Linense
- Atlético Zabal
- Calderón
- Algeciras

Senior career*
Years	Team	Apps	(Gls)
2006–2008	Algeciras	2	(0)
2008	Quintanar Rey		
2008–2009	Atlético Zabal	8	(6)
2009–2010	Linense	4	(0)
2010	Los Barrios	13	(2)
2010–2011	Linense	13	(1)
2011	→ San Roque (loan)	6	(1)
2011–2012	San Roque	30	(10)
2012–2013	Portsmouth	26	(2)
2013–2014	San Roque	9	(2)
2014	Bnei Yehuda	13	(1)
2014–2016	Lincoln Red Imps	34	(25)
2016–2017	Europa	26	(15)
2017–2018	Notts County	11	(0)
2018–2021	Europa	53	(41)
2021–2024	Lincoln Red Imps	56	(23)
2024–2025	St Joseph's	21	(4)
2025–2026	Europa	9	(1)

International career^{‡}
2011–2013	Gibraltar XI (Non-FIFA)	22	(4)
2011–	Gibraltar	93	(12)
- * Club domestic league appearances and goals as of 19:10, 7 November 2025 (UTC) ‡ National team caps and goals as of 9 June 2025 (UTC)

Liam Walker (born 13 April 1988) is a Gibraltarian footballer who most recently played as a midfielder for Gibraltar Football League side Europa and the Gibraltar national team.

Walker spent most of his career with lower-league Spanish clubs and in the Gibraltar Premier Division. He has also played in England with Football League sides Portsmouth and Notts County, and in the Israeli Premier League with Bnei Yehuda Tel Aviv.

Walker made his international debut for Gibraltar in November 2013, during their first official match. He is Gibraltar's most capped player and all-time top goalscorer, with seven goals.

== Club career ==
=== Spanish lower levels ===
Walker began his career in Algeciras CF, making his debut on 22 October 2006, against Ayamonte. He received his first start on 22 May 2007, against CD Mairena. He already had trials with Manchester United, Everton and Aston Villa as a teenager.

In 2008 summer, after a short period at CD Quintanar del Rey, Walker joined Atlético Zabal (Real Balompédica Linense's farm team), but only appeared in eight matches (575 minutes overall), scoring six times. During the 2009–10 season, he was promoted to Linense's first team, but only made four appearances, all from the bench, 89 minutes overall, being later separated from the squad due to indiscipline problems.

In January 2010, Walker signed with UD Los Barrios, and made his debut on the 31st, against Puerto Real CF. He scored his first goals on 27 April, against Sevilla FC C. In May 2010, Walker returned to Linense, getting more playing time than his last spell, appearing in 13 matches (849 minutes overall) and scoring once (against UD Los Palacios on 26 September).

In January of the following year, Walker was loaned to CD San Roque, in the Spanish fifth division. In his first season, he only appeared six times and scored once, with his team being promoted to fourth division. In his second season, now with a permanent deal, he was the club's topscorer and best player of the season, scoring ten goals in 30 games (all starts).

=== Portsmouth ===
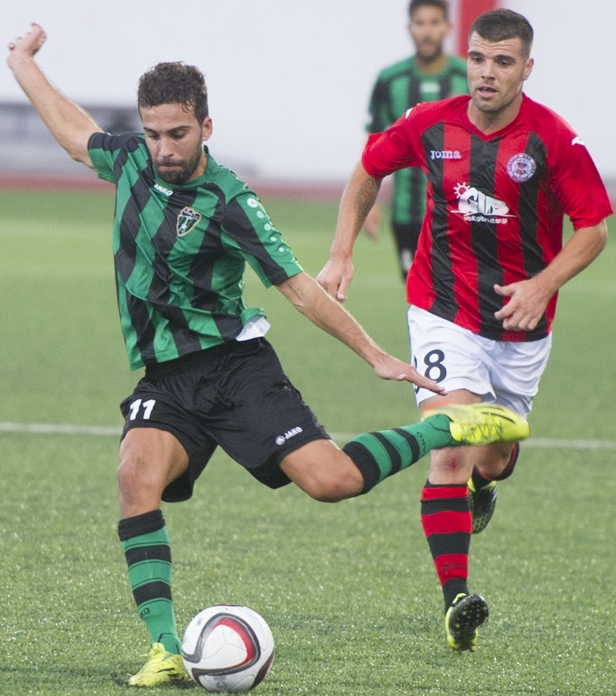
Walker (right) with Lincoln Red Imps in 2015

In July 2012, Walker was called by Portsmouth manager Michael Appleton to train with the club, after an impressive performance for Gibraltar. He was a part of the squad in the club pre-season matches, against Bolton Wanderers, on 4 August. In his next game, on 8 August, he scored the final goal, against AFC Wimbledon.

On 16 August, Walker signed a one-month contract with Pompey. However, due to his international clearance not being made by RFEF in time, he was unable to play on the opening day of the League One season against Bournemouth. He only made his debut on 21 August 2012, in an away match against Colchester United, coming in for Kieran Djilali who started on the bench. Walker played on the wing on his debut whilst Portsmouth captain Brian Howard and Lee Williamson played in the centre. Portsmouth drew with Colchester 2–2, with goals for Pompey through Luke Rodgers and Jordan Obita. Walker hit the post early in the second half and also assisted Rodgers in the first goal of the match. He then started in the following two games (against Carlisle United and Oldham Athletic), before being dropped to the bench. Walker only received a start three months later, against Yeovil Town, on 29 December.

Walker scored his first league goal for Portsmouth against Scunthorpe United on 2 February 2013. He scored his second on the 16th, against Carlisle United, from the penalty spot. Walker finished the season with three assists, only behind Jed Wallace (five) and Howard (six).

At the end of the season, Walker was challenged to earn a new deal by manager Guy Whittingham. However, on 9 July, Walker announced that he would join a Greek club.

=== Trials and back to San Roque ===
It was reported that Walker turned up at a training base of Dundee United in Spain without notice and requested a possible trial. This was however refused by Dundee United's management. He was also linked to a move for Aris Thessaloniki, but the deal fell through.

In late July, Walker returned to San Roque, only training with the club while waiting for a "convincing offer" from any club. On 2 August, he signed with San Roque.

Walker scored in his San Roque re-debut on 5 October, but in a 1–2 home loss against Recreativo B. He finished his second spell with the club with nine appearances, scoring two goals.

=== Bnei Yehuda ===
On 9 January 2014, it was announced that Walker had been released from his contract with CD San Roque after his buyout clause had been met. On 21 January, he joined Israeli Premier League side Beni Yehuda Tel Aviv on a two-and-a-half year contract, after being recommended by Yossi Benayoun and reuniting with former teammate James Keene.

He played 14 total games during his time in the Middle East, scoring a long-range free kick in a 2–0 win at Hapoel Ra'anana on 1 February.

=== Lincoln Red Imps ===
On 16 September 2014, Lincoln Red Imps announced that Walker had returned to Gibraltar to play for them. In his first season, Walker scored 13 goals in 10 league matches, placing him third in the league in scoring. In August 2016, it was Lincoln Red Imps announced that Walkers recently expired contract would not be extended. In total Walker appeared in 43 league matches for the club, scoring 24 goals.

=== Europa FC ===
On 18 August 2016 it was announced that Walker had signed for Europa FC, a regular Europa League participant and fellow Gibraltar Premier Division club. Walker debuted for Europa on 18 September 2016 in the 2016 Pepe Reyes Cup against his former club Lincoln. Europa won the match 2–0 with Enrique "Kike" Gomez scoring a brace. Walker tallied an assists and played all 90 minutes of the match. During Europa's first match of the 2016–17 season, Walker scored his first goal for his new club on his league debut, the only goal in 1–0 victory over Lions Gibraltar.

=== Notts County ===
After scoring in the Greens' Champions League exit to The New Saints, Walker went on trial with EFL League One club Southend United, appearing in the second half of their friendly with Braintree Town. He then went on trial with Notts County of EFL League Two and appeared in a pre-season friendly against Nottingham Forest.

On 25 July 2017, it was confirmed that he had impressed manager Kevin Nolan enough to earn a permanent deal with the Magpies. He made his debut on 5 August, starting in a 3–0 loss at Coventry City in the season opener. On 30 April 2018, Walker left the Meadow Lane club after 19 official games "to pursue opportunities elsewhere". He signed a three-year contract back at Europa in June.

=== Back to Gibraltar ===
In 2021, Walker returned to Lincoln Red Imps. Three years later he moved again, joining rivals St Joseph's.

== International career ==
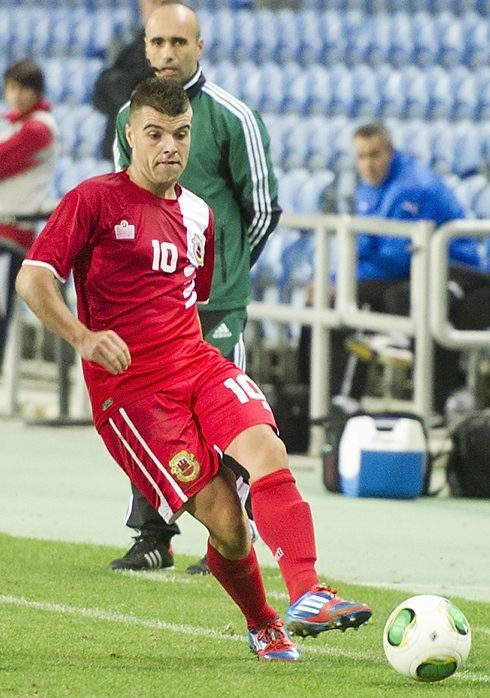
Walker playing for Gibraltar in 2013.

Walker played in 2011 Island Games, starting in all Gibraltar's matches, and scoring a hat-trick against Ynys Môn on 27 June. Walker stood as the only professional player in the national team.

After Gibraltar was accepted as a member of UEFA, Walker was selected as part of the 23-man squad for Gibraltar's official debut against Slovakia on 19 November 2013. He earned a starting spot in the 0–0 draw, played in Faro, Portugal.

On 6 September 2016, Walker scored his first international goal as Gibraltar made their World Cup qualifying debut against Greece. Walker hit the net with a curling left-footed shot from just inside the box, levelling the score at 1–1 before his side eventually fell to a 1–4 defeat. This was Gibraltar's first competitive goal as a member of FIFA. Walker was named the FIFA Player of the Day following the match. Walker scored his second international goal on 25 March 2018, a deflected free-kick which proved decisive as Gibraltar beat Latvia 1–0 in a friendly, their first win on home soil since joining UEFA.

In November 2020, Walker became the first player to reach 50 caps for Gibraltar since the side joined UEFA. On 9 June 2022, he scored his fourth goal for his country from the penalty spot as Gibraltar held Bulgaria - a side then ranked 130 places higher in the FIFA rankings - to a 1–1 draw.

On 8 September 2024, Walker scored directly from a corner and saw a penalty saved as Gibraltar drew 2–2 with Liechtenstein in the 2024-25 Nations League. This goal saw Walker again become Gibraltar's outright top goalscorer, with six goals.

== Career statistics ==
=== Club ===
As of match played 5 July 2024

Appearances and goals by club, season and competition
Club	Season	League			National cup (Note: Includes Copa del Rey, FA Cup, Israel State Cup, Rock Cup)		League cup (Note: Includes Gibraltar Premier Cup)		Continental		Other		Total	
Club	Season	Division	Apps	Goals	Apps	Goals	Apps	Goals	Apps	Goals	Apps	Goals	Apps	Goals
Algeciras	2006–07	Tercera División	2	0	—		—		—		—		2	0
Algeciras	2007–08	Segunda División B	0	0	1	0	—		—		—		1	0
Algeciras	Total		2	0	1	0	—		—		—		3	0
Atlético Zabal	2008–09	Regional Preferente	8	6	—		—		—		—		8	6
Linense	2009–10	Tercera División	4	0	—		—		—		—		4	0
Los Barrios	2009–10	Tercera División	13	2	—		—		—		—		13	2
Linense	2010–11	Tercera División	13	1	—		—		—		—		13	1
San Roque	2010–11	Primera Andaluza	6	1	—		—		—		—		6	1
San Roque	2011–12	Tercera División	30	10	—		—		—		—		30	10
San Roque	Total		36	11	—		—		—		—		36	11
Portsmouth	2012–13	League One	26	2	1	0	0	0	—		1 (Note: Appearance in Football League Trophy)	0	28	2
San Roque	2013–14	Tercera División	9	2	—		—		—		—		9	2
Bnei Yehuda	2013–14	Israeli Premier League	13	1	1	0	—		—		—		14	1
Lincoln Red Imps	2014–15	Gibraltar Premier Division	10	13	2	3	5	3	—		—		17	19
Lincoln Red Imps	2015–16	Gibraltar Premier Division	24	12	?	?	—		4 (Note: Appearance(s) in UEFA Champions League)	0	1	0	29	12
Lincoln Red Imps	2016–17	Gibraltar Premier Division	0	0	0	0	—		4	0	–		4	0
Lincoln Red Imps	Total		34	25	2	3	5	3	8	0	1	0	50	31
Europa	2016–17	Gibraltar Premier Division	26	15	4	1	—		0	0	1	0	31	16
Europa	2017–18	Gibraltar Premier Division	0	0	0	0	—		2	1	0	0	2	1
Europa	Total		26	15	4	1	–		2	1	1	0	33	17
Notts County	2017–18	League Two	11	0	1	0	0	0	—		3	0	15	0
Europa	2018–19	Gibraltar Premier Division	25	12	3	2	—		2	0	1	0	31	14
Europa	2019–20	Gibraltar National League	16	20	0	0	0	0	4	1	0	0	20	21
Europa	2020–21	Gibraltar National League	12	9	3	2	0	0	2	0	0	0	17	11
Europa	Total		53	41	6	4	0	0	8	1	1	0	68	46
Lincoln Red Imps	2021–22	Gibraltar National League	16	11	0	0	0	0	12	4	0	0	28	15
Lincoln Red Imps	2022–23	Gibraltar National League	17	7	2	1	0	0	4	0	0	0	23	8
Lincoln Red Imps	2023–24	Gibraltar National League	23	5	0	0	0	0	4	0	0	0	27	5
Lincoln Red Imps	Total		56	23	2	1	0	0	20	4	0	0	78	28
Career total			304	129	18	9	5	3	38	6	7	0	372	147

=== International ===
As of match played 9 June 2025

Appearances and goals by national team and year
National team	Year	Apps	Goals
Gibraltar	2011	5	4
Gibraltar	2012	0	0
Gibraltar	2013	1	0
Gibraltar	2014	7	0
Gibraltar	2015	7	0
Gibraltar	2016	7	1
Gibraltar	2017	6	0
Gibraltar	2018	7	1
Gibraltar	2019	9	0
Gibraltar	2020	6	0
Gibraltar	2021	7	1
Gibraltar	2022	10	2
Gibraltar	2023	8	0
Gibraltar	2024	10	3
Gibraltar	2025	3	0
Total		93	12

Scores and results list Gibraltar's goal tally first, score column indicates score after each Walker goal.

List of international goals scored by Liam Walker
No.	Date	Venue	Opponent	Score	Result	Competition
1	6 September 2016	Estádio Algarve, Faro, Portugal	Greece	1–1	1–4	2018 FIFA World Cup qualification
2	25 March 2018	Victoria Stadium, Gibraltar	Latvia	1–0	1–0	Friendly
3	16 November 2021	Victoria Stadium, Gibraltar	Latvia	1–0	1–3	2022 FIFA World Cup qualification
4	9 June 2022	Victoria Stadium, Gibraltar	Bulgaria	1–1	1–1	2022–23 UEFA Nations League C
5	16 November 2022	Victoria Stadium, Gibraltar	Liechtenstein	2–0	2–0	Friendly
6	8 September 2024	Europa Point Stadium, Gibraltar	Liechtenstein	1–0	2–2	2024–25 UEFA Nations League D
7	15 November 2024	San Marino Stadium, Serravalle, San Marino	San Marino	1–0	1–1	2024–25 UEFA Nations League D
8	19 November 2024	Europa Point Stadium, Gibraltar	Moldova	1–1	1–1	Friendly

== Honours ==
Lincoln Red Imps

- Gibraltar Premier Division: 2014–15, 2015–16, 2021–22, 2022–23, 2023–24
- Rock Cup: 2014–15, 2015–16, 2021–22, 2023–24
- Pepe Reyes Cup: 2015, 2022

Europa

- Gibraltar Premier Division: 2016–17
- Rock Cup: 2016–17, 2019
- Pepe Reyes Cup: 2019

St Joseph's

- Pepe Reyes Cup: 2024

Individual

- Gibraltar Premier Division Player of the Month: November 2019
- Gibraltar Premier Division Midfielder of the Season: 2019–20
- Gibraltar Premier Division Player of the Season: 2019–20
- Gibraltar Premier Division Fans' Player of the Season: 2019–20
- Gibraltar Premier Division Fans' Team of the Season: 2019–20
