= Idelino Colubali =

Bissau-Guinean footballer (born 1994)

Personal information
- Full name: Idelino Gomes Colubali
- Date of birth: 1 January 1994 (age 32)
- Place of birth: Canchungo, Guinea-Bissau
- Height: 2.04 m (6 ft 8 in)
- Position: Forward

Youth career
- 2009–2010: FC Canchungo
- 2010–2012: CDR Gabú
- 2012: Gondomar

Senior career*
Years	Team	Apps	(Gls)
2012–2014	Gondomar	25	(1)
2014–2015	Fátima	17	(2)
2015	União de Leiria	8	(1)
2015–2016	Torreense	5	(0)
2016	Alcanenense	15	(8)
2016–2019	Boavista	5	(0)
2017	→ FK Jerv (loan)	11	(2)
2017–2018	→ Cinfães (loan)	7	(2)
2018–2019	Boavista B	11	(6)
2019	Sertanense	6	(0)
2019–2020	Lincoln Red Imps	5	(5)
2020	Teuta Durrës	8	(1)
2021	Magni Grenivík	5	(0)
2021–2022	Gondomar	17	(2)
2022–2023	Mazara	28	(13)
2023	Mirandela	7	(0)
2024	Micaelense	14	(5)
2024	Rio Tinto	6	(2)
2024–2025	Leixões B	11	(1)
2025–2026	Boavista SAD	0	(0)
- * Club domestic league appearances and goals

Idelino Gomes Colubali (born 1 January 1994), known as Idé Gomes or Idé Colubali, is a Bissau-Guinean professional footballer who plays as a forward.

== Career ==
On 5 December 2015, Colubali made his professional debut with Boavista in a 2014–15 Primeira Liga match against Paços Ferreira.

In August 2019, he joined Gibraltar National League side Lincoln Red Imps. Colubali then moved to Albanian club Teuta Durrës in January 2020.

He then briefly played in Iceland for 2. deild karla (third tier) club Magni Grenivík. After returning to Gondomar, he moved to Italy to sign for Eccellenza Sicily amateurs Mazara in September 2022. He concluded the season with 13 goals, being the league top-scorer for the Gialloblu.

In June 2023, Colubali returned to Portugal, joining Campeonato de Portugal side Mirandela. Six months later, on 22 December, he departed from the club.

Following the breakup with Mirandela, Coulibali played for several Portuguese clubs in the lower divisions before returning to his former club, Boavista, in August 2025.
