= Víctor Afonso =

Spanish footballer and manager

Personal information
- Full name: Víctor Manuel Afonso Mateo
- Date of birth: 27 August 1971 (age 55)
- Place of birth: Las Palmas, Spain
- Height: 1.83 m (6 ft 0 in)
- Position: Centre back

Youth career
- Las Palmas

Senior career*
Years	Team	Apps	(Gls)
1990–1991	Las Palmas B	22	(0)
1991–2000	Las Palmas	195	(0)
2000–2001	Albacete	0	(0)
2001	Universidad LP	17	(0)
2001–2002	Hércules	24	(1)
2002–2005	Castillo		
2005–2007	Las Palmas	52	(1)
Total		310	(2)

Managerial career
- 2007–2008: Las Palmas (assistant)
- 2008–2014: Las Palmas B
- 2015: Mensajero
- 2015–2016: Atlético Madrid B
- 2018–2019: Lincoln Red Imps
- 2019–2020: Al-Tai U20
- 2020: Al-Tai (caretaker)
- * Club domestic league appearances and goals

Víctor Manuel Afonso Mateos (born 27 August 1971) is a Spanish retired footballer who played as a central defender, and currently is a manager.

== Playing career ==
He spent the majority of his playing time in Las Palmas, his hometown's club in the Canary Islands.

== Managerial statistics ==
As of 13 December 2019

Managerial record by team and tenure
Team	Nat	From	To	Record								Ref
Team	Nat	From	To	G	W	D	L	GF	GA	GD	Win %	Ref
Las Palmas B	(Spain)	25 November 2008	2 June 2014	237	124	62	51	398	218	+180	52.32	
Mensajero	(Spain)	18 June 2015	19 June 2015	0	0	0	0	0	0	+0	—	
Atlético Madrid B	(Spain)	25 June 2015	19 June 2016	40	17	14	9	48	31	+17	42.50	
Lincoln Red Imps	(Gibraltar)	13 December 2018	19 December 2019	31	21	1	9	105	29	+76	67.74	
Total				308	162	77	69	551	278	+273	52.60	—

== Honours ==
=== Manager ===
Lincoln Red Imps

- Gibraltar Premier Division: 2018–19
