= Lynx F.C. =

Association football club in Gibraltar

Lynx
- Full name: Lynx Football Club
- Nickname: The Yellows
- Founded: 2007
- Ground: Victoria Stadium
- Capacity: 2,000
- President: Jack Noble
- Manager: Rafael Berges
- League: Gibraltar Football League
- 2025–26: GFL, 6th
- Website: www.lynxfc.net
Home colours	Away colours

Lynx FC is a professional football club from the British Overseas Territory of Gibraltar. They play in the Gibraltar Football League. The club colours are yellow and black.

== History ==
The club was formed in 2007 and has been managed by Albert Parody for the majority of its history, making him the country's longest serving manager. After winning the Gibraltar Second Division in 2012, thus earning promotion to the Gibraltar Premier Division, the club have established themselves as a top flight team. Lynx recorded an impressive 4th place in the 2013–14 season, Gibraltar's first season with an 8 team league as members of UEFA. Since then, the club have settled into mid-table.

In 2015 they appointed former national team coach Allen Bula as a sporting director, as well as becoming a feeder club to Slovak side MFK Košice, for whom Bula was an academy coach before managing Gibraltar. Another mid-table finish followed, however, squad changes over the summer left them struggling in the bottom of the table for the first half of the 2016–17 season leaving question marks over Albert Parody's future at the club. Changes in January 2017 saw the signing of key players including goalkeeper Dany Fernandes and defender Charlie Mitchell, and an upturn in form saw a comfortable 6th-place finish at the end of the season. On 2 June Albert Parody, the longest serving manager in the Gibraltar Premier Division, resigned and was replaced by Allen Bula. However, after 4 games and 4 defeats without any goals scored, it was reported that Bula had parted ways with the club on 27 October.

=== Domestic history ===
Season	League									Rock Cup	Other		League top goalscorer	
Season	Division	P	W	D	L	GF	GA	Pts	Pos	Rock Cup	Competition	Result	Name	Goals
2012–13	Premier	15	4	2	9	18	42	14	4th	Second round				
2013–14	Premier	14	9	2	3	36	18	29	3rd	Quarter-final	Gibraltar Premier Cup	Semi-finals	Sergio Ginés	14
2014–15	Premier	21	10	8	3	36	18	38	3rd	Runners-Up	Gibraltar Premier Cup	Group stage	Raducio King	10
2015–16	Premier	27	11	2	14	37	40	35	5th	Second round			Agustin Doxagarat	7
2016–17	Premier	27	8	4	15	34	45	28	6th	Quarter-final			Raúl Segura	9
2017–18	Premier	27	6	4	17	22	48	22	9th	Second round			Franco Gargiulo	6
2018–19	Premier	27	8	7	12	29	45	31	7th	Second round			Alberto Valdivia	6
2019–20	National	17	9	2	6	37	30	29	4th (Note: Season abandoned due to the COVID-19 pandemic)	First round			Alberto Valdivia	7
2020–21	National	20	8	2	10	36	40	26	5th	Quarter–final			Aritz Hernández	11
2021–22	National	18	6	1	11	25	38	19	9th	First round			4 players	2
2022–23	GFL	20	10	3	7	33	29	33	4th	Quarter-finals			Aldair Ruiz	12
2023–24	GFL	20	8	3	9	29	31	27	7th	Quarter-finals			Connor Flynn-Gillespie	14
2024–25	GFL	20	5	2	13	25	51	17	9th	First round			Marco Farisato	14

== Honours ==
- Gibraltar Division 2 Cup
  - Winners: 2012

== Players ==
=== Current squad ===
Note: Flags indicate national team as defined under FIFA eligibility rules; some limited exceptions apply. Players may hold more than one non-FIFA nationality.

No.	Pos.	Nation	Player
1	GK	GIB	Robert Rae
2	DF	BRA	André dos Santos (captain)
3	DF	BRA	Renan Bernardes
4	DF	NED	Kai Boham
5	DF	BRA	Vinicius
7	FW	GIB	Michael Ruiz
8	FW	ESP	Denis Cabeza
9	MF	GIB	Omar Salah
10	FW	NGR	Sunday Faleye
11	MF	GIB	Rafi Emrani
13	GK	CAN	Matt Silva
14	FW	BEL	Mamadou Diallo

No.	Pos.	Nation	Player
17	DF	ESP	Joel Coronil
18	MF	ESP	Juan Serrano
19	DF	ESP	Jorge Maristany
20	FW	GIB	Kelvin Morgan
21	MF	SCO	Duncun Lamont
22	MF	GIB	Jonathan Molina
23	MF	GIB	Richard Felipes
33	MF	GIB	Kevagn Robba
39	FW	GIB	Byron Esponisa
66	FW	ESP	Juanjo Pérez
88	MF	ENG	Nader Zeddini
99	GK	GIB	Jamie Robba

== Club staff ==
Position	Name
Club Management
Head coach	(Spain) David Guti
Assistant Coach	(Spain) Antonio Méndez
Goalkeeper Coach	(Spain) José Requena
Physical Trainer	(Spain) Paco Ríos
Physio	(Spain) Chema Triviño
Team delegate	(Spain) Jesús Iglesias
Board
President	(England) Jack Noble
Chief Executive Officer	(Gibraltar) Albert Parody
General Manager	(Gibraltar) Deidre Rae
Sporting Director	(Gibraltar) Jansen Dalli
Director	(Argentina) Sergio Revelli
Youth Co-ordinator	(Gibraltar) Jeky Buhagiar
