= Jayce Olivero =

Gibraltarian footballer (born 1998)

Personal information
- Full name: Jayce Lee Mascarenhas-Olivero
- Date of birth: 2 July 1998 (age 28)
- Place of birth: Gibraltar
- Height: 1.82 m (6 ft 0 in)
- Positions: Left-back; left midfielder

Team information
- Current team: FC Magpies
- Number: 12

Youth career
- Lions Gibraltar

Senior career*
| Years | Team | Apps | (Gls) |
| 2013–2016 | Lions Gibraltar | 49 | (0) |
| 2016–2019 | Abingdon United | 44 | (3) |
| 2019–2023 | Europa | 67 | (2) |
| 2023–2024 | Helsingør | 3 | (0) |
| 2024–2026 | St Joseph's | 35 | (2) |
| 2026– | FC Magpies | 7 | (0) |

International career^{‡}
| 2013–2014 | Gibraltar U-17 | 5 | (0) |
| 2014–2015 | Gibraltar U-19 | 5 | (0) |
| 2017–2020 | Gibraltar U-21 | 4 | (0) |
| 2016– | Gibraltar | 66 | (0) |
- * Club domestic league appearances and goals as of 22 November 2026 ‡ National team caps and goals as of 17 November 2025

Jayce Lee Mascarenhas-Olivero (born 2 July 1998) is a Gibraltarian footballer who plays as a defender for Gibraltar Football League club FC Magpies. He is member of the Gibraltar national football team, having played at every youth level since Gibraltar joined UEFA in 2013.

== Club career ==
Olivero is a product of the Lions Gibraltar youth academy, and broke into the team during the 2014-15 season at the age of 16. In summer 2015 he had a trial at West Ham United to gain experience of professional training. He returned to the revamped Lions team for the coming season and became a regular in the side, playing an important role as the previous season's bottom side made an early challenge for European qualification. In February 2016, he had a short trial at Leicester City, playing in a youth team game watched by scouts from other professional teams, before returning to Gibraltar. In 2016, he moved to Abingdon United for the duration of his studies. In his first season at the club, he helped them to second in the Hellenic League Division One West, and promotion. For his efforts, Olivero was voted Supporters' Player of the Season. After suffering relegation in 2019, it was announced that Olivero had signed for Europa back in Gibraltar on 15 May 2019, joining officially in time for the club's Europa League campaign. He made his debut in the 2019–20 UEFA Europa League preliminary round against UE Sant Julià on 27 June. After four years at Europa, during which time he became club captain, he left the club in 2023 as the owners scaled back investment. He joined Danish 1st Division side FC Helsingør on 30 August 2023. He returned to his native Gibraltar in January 2024, signing for St Joseph's.

== International career ==
He made his debut for the Gibraltar national football team aged 17 years and 264 days on 23 March 2016, starting in a goalless draw against Liechtenstein at the Victoria Stadium - making him the territory's youngest UEFA era player at the time until Dylan Borge broke his record in March 2021. His addition into a five-man defence by manager Jeff Wood allowed the formerly defensive Joseph Chipolina to attack. In the 69th-minute, shortly after being booked, Olivero was substituted for Jeremy Lopez. In October 2020, he was named captain for the first time, against Malta.

=== International statistics ===
As of 17 November 2025

Gibraltar
| Year | Apps | Goals |
|---|---|---|
| 2016 | 6 | 0 |
| 2017 | 5 | 0 |
| 2018 | 7 | 0 |
| 2019 | 9 | 0 |
| 2020 | 6 | 0 |
| 2021 | 4 | 0 |
| 2022 | 9 | 0 |
| 2023 | 8 | 0 |
| 2024 | 9 | 0 |
| 2025 | 3 | 0 |
| Total | 66 | 0 |

== Honours ==
Abingdon United

- Hellenic Football League Division One West - Promotion: 2016–17
- Supporters' Player of the Season: 2016–17

Europa

- Pepe Reyes Cup: 2019, 2021
- Football Gibraltar Young Player of the Season: 2019–20

St Joseph's

- Pepe Reyes Cup: 2024
