= Sergio Molina (footballer, born 1983) =

Spanish footballer

Personal information
- Full name: Sergio Molina Rivero
- Date of birth: 14 November 1983 (age 42)
- Place of birth: Málaga, Spain
- Height: 1.72 m (5 ft 8 in)
- Position: Forward

Youth career
- Málaga

Senior career*
Years	Team	Apps	(Gls)
2001–2002	Málaga B		
2002–2003	Atlético Benamiel		
2003–2004	Atlético Madrid B	9	(0)
2004–2006	Ceuta	25	(3)
2006–2007	Marbella	11	(1)
2007–2008	San Isidro	16	(5)
2008–2009	Granada 74	34	(5)
2009–2010	Caravaca	31	(3)
2010–2011	Orihuela	33	(9)
2011–2012	Puertollano	20	(11)
2012–2014	Albacete	70	(12)
2014	Panthrakikos	13	(1)
2014–2017	Jaén	91	(18)
2017–2018	Linense	8	(1)
2018–2020	Lincoln Red Imps	22	(13)
2020–2021	Antequera	16	(0)
2021	Alhaurino	13	(0)
2022–2023	Rincón	46	(10)
2023–2024	Alhaurino	23	(0)
2024–2025	CD Málaga 1903	29	(2)
- * Club domestic league appearances and goals as of 17 May 2025

Sergio Molina Rivero (born 14 November 1983) is a Spanish professional footballer who plays as a forward.
