= Dayle Coleing =

Gibraltarian footballer

Personal information
- Full name: Dayle Edward Coleing
- Date of birth: 23 October 1996 (age 30)
- Place of birth: Gibraltar
- Height: 1.94 m (6 ft 4 in)
- Position: Goalkeeper

Youth career
- 2003–2005: Warminster Highbury
- 2006–2014: Manchester 62

College career
| Years | Team | Apps | (Gls) |
| 2015–2017 | Leeds Trinity | | |

Senior career*
| Years | Team | Apps | (Gls) |
| 2013–2014 | Manchester 62 | 2 | (0) |
| 2014–2015 | Lincoln Red Imps | 6 | (0) |
| 2015–2017 | Manchester 62 | 2 | (0) |
| 2015–2016 | → Thackley (loan) | 16 | (0) |
| 2016–2017 | → Liversedge (loan) | 2 | (0) |
| 2017–2018 | Gibraltar Phoenix | 0 | (0) |
| 2018–2020 | Europa | 19 | (0) |
| 2020–2022 | Glentoran | 20 | (0) |
| 2021–2022 | → Lincoln Red Imps (loan) | 7 | (0) |
| 2022–2024 | Lincoln Red Imps | 22 | (0) |
| 2024 | FCB Magpies | 3 | (0) |

International career^{‡}
| 2013–2014 | Gibraltar U19 | 6 | (0) |
| 2018 | Gibraltar U21 | 1 | (0) |
| 2019–2024 | Gibraltar | 32 | (0) |
- * Club domestic league appearances and goals as of 14 September 2024 ‡ National team caps and goals as of 21 March 2024

Dayle Edward Coleing (born 23 October 1996) is a Gibraltarian professional footballer who last played as a goalkeeper for Gibraltar Football League club FCB Magpies and the Gibraltar national football team. He currently serves as a goalkeeper coach for Gibraltar.

== Club career ==
=== Early career and breakthrough at Europa ===
As a child, Coleing played youth football in Wiltshire for Warminster Highbury while his father was stationed in the UK, and during this time he trained with Bristol Rovers Academy. Upon his return to Gibraltar, he joined Manchester 62 where he made his senior debut at 16, before progressing to the dominant Lincoln Red Imps side. However, after just one season, he returned to Manchester 62 ahead of a move to the UK, where he would study at Leeds Trinity University. There, he played for the university side as well as non-league clubs Thackley and Liversedge. During this time he was also offered a trial at Sheffield United and trained with Guiseley.

After completing his studies, Coleing returned to Gibraltar in 2017 to join Gibraltar Phoenix, however it would be at Europa where he secured his position as first choice keeper during the 2019–20 season. His performances at club and international level subsequently attracted the attention of a number of overseas clubs, including Northern Irish side Glentoran. However, Europa FC expressed a reluctance to let Coleing leave for Northern Ireland without triggering his £50,000 release clause, citing the UEFA coefficients when stating their belief that Glentoran would be a "sideways step" for the keeper.

=== Glentoran ===
Nonetheless, in August 2020 Glentoran offered the full £50,000 release fee for Coleing, and on 10 August Europa announced that Coleing had left the club. He was officially announced by the Glens the next day, becoming the first Gibraltarian to play for the Northern Irish side since Colin Ramirez in the 1993–94 season. He kept a clean sheet on his debut in a 1–0 Europa League win over Havnar Bóltfelag. Despite securing his status as first choice goalkeeper in his first season with some impressive displays for club and country, he was loaned back to Lincoln Red Imps on 12 August 2021.

After two seasons back with Lincoln Red Imps on a permanent basis, Coleing joined FCB Magpies in summer 2024. However, he ended his time at the club early in September 2024 for personal reasons, and has not played since. In September 2026, he became goalkeeper coach for the Gibraltar national team.

== International career ==
Despite being involved with the senior team since 2014 (and appearing with the team in Non-FIFA football since the age of 15), Coleing made his international debut for Gibraltar on 5 September 2019, starting in the UEFA Euro 2020 qualifying match against Denmark. While studying in England, he also represented the England Universities North squad. Throughout the 2020–21 UEFA Nations League campaign, Coleing shared goalkeeping duties with Kyle Goldwin as Gibraltar earned an historic promotion in a group with Liechtenstein and San Marino. In March 2021, after making a string of impressive saves despite a 3–0 loss to Norway in a 2022 FIFA World Cup qualification game, Coleing earned a number of plaudits from commentators including former Norway striker Jan Åge Fjørtoft, who compared his performance to Manuel Neuer and Jan Oblak.

On 18 November 2023, Coleing conceded 14 goals in a Euro qualifier against France, giving the latter their largest margin of victory in history.

== Career statistics ==
=== International ===
As of 21 March 2024

Gibraltar
| Year | Apps | Goals |
|---|---|---|
| 2019 | 4 | 0 |
| 2020 | 3 | 0 |
| 2021 | 8 | 0 |
| 2022 | 6 | 0 |
| 2023 | 10 | 0 |
| 2024 | 1 | 0 |
| Total | 32 | 0 |
