= Luis Manuel Blanco =

Argentine football coach

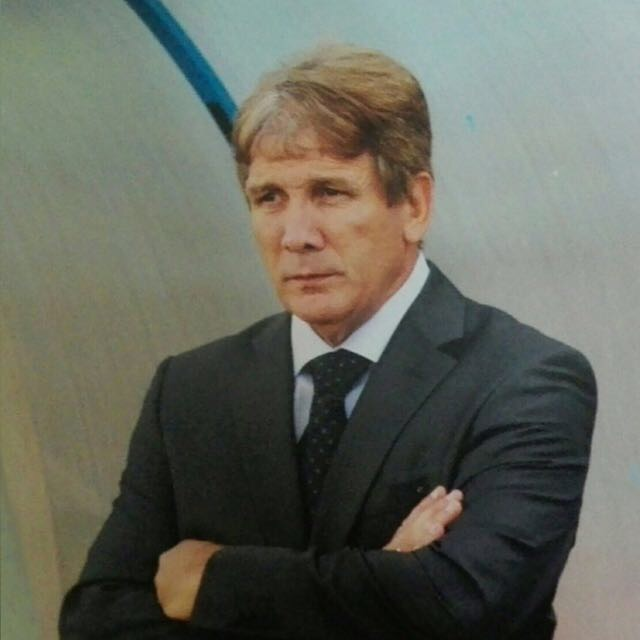
- Blanco in 2000

Personal information
- Full name: Luis Manuel Blanco
- Date of birth: December 13, 1953 (age 72)
- Position: Forward

Team information
- Current team: College 1975

Senior career*
Years	Team	Apps	(Gls)
- Lanús
1973–1974	Boca Juniors		
1975–1976	Oriente Petrolero		
- Club Jorge Wilstermann
1978–1979	Toronto Metros-Croatia		
1979–1980	Chicago Sting		
1980–1981	Tigre		
- Club Jorge Wilstermann

Managerial career
- 1991–1992: Cobras de Ciudad Juárez
- 1993–1996: Platense
- 1997–1998: Veracruz
- 1998: Belgrano
- 1999: Deportivo Español
- 2000–2001: Independiente Rivadavia
- 2002: Godoy Cruz
- 2003: Gimnasia y Esgrima de Jujuy
- 2004: Club Jorge Wilstermann
- 2005: Huracán de Tres Arroyos
- 2006: San Martín de Mendoza
- 2007: Luján de Cuyo
- 2008: CS Cartaginés
- 2009: Universidad de Los Andes
- 2010: Dinamo Tirana
- 2011–2012: 3 de Febrero
- 2012: Beijing U-20
- 2013: Indonesia
- 2014: Flandria
- 2014–2015: Aurora
- 2017: Boxing Club
- 2018–2019: Mons Calpe
- 2020: Mons Calpe
- 2023–: College 1975
- * Club domestic league appearances and goals

Luis Manuel Blanco (born 13 December 1953) is an Argentine football coach and former player, who currently manages College 1975 in the Gibraltar Football League.

He was formerly the head coach of the Indonesia national team. His stay in Indonesia was brief, as he was replaced by Rahmad Darmawan after less than a month and no matches.

In April 2020, he was hospitalised after contracting COVID-19 and spent five days in a coma. A few weeks later, it was announced that he had recovered.
