= Jamie Robba =

Gibraltarian footballer (born 1991)

Personal information
- Full name: Jaime Kevagn Robba
- Date of birth: 26 October 1991 (age 35)
- Place of birth: Gibraltar
- Position: Goalkeeper

Team information
- Current team: Lynx
- Number: 99

Youth career
- 200?–2009: St Joseph's
- 2009–2011: Atlético Zabal Linense

Senior career*
Years	Team	Apps	(Gls)
2011–2013	RB Linense		
2011–2012	→ UD Castellar (loan)		
2013–2014	Lynx	11	(0)
2014–2015	Europa	15	(0)
2015–2016	Le Pontet	0	(0)
2015–2016	→ Lynx (loan)	17	(0)
2016–2017	Torquay United	0	(0)
2017–2023	St Joseph's	91	(0)
2026–	Lynx	11	(0)

International career^{‡}
2014–2016	Gibraltar	8	(0)
- * Club domestic league appearances and goals as of 22 November 2026 ‡ National team caps and goals as of 20:00, 1 September 2016 (UTC)

Jaime Kevagn Robba (born 26 October 1991), known as Jamie Robba, is a Gibraltarian footballer who plays for Lynx, and formerly the Gibraltar national team, as a goalkeeper.

He has played football in Gibraltar, Spain, France and England, while also featuring in the UEFA Europa League qualification rounds with Europa during the 2014–15 season.

== Club career ==
=== Youth ===
Robba began his career with St Joseph's, where he progressed through the youth system until the age of 18. A move across the border saw him join the youth ranks of Spanish outfit Atletico Zabal for two years, before signing for parent club RB Linense in July 2011.

=== UD Castellar ===
Immediately after joining he was loaned out to UD Castellar, where he became the first choice goalkeeper throughout the 2011–12 campaign. Upon his return, he predominantly featured for the B team while acting as third choice goalkeeper for the first team In February 2013, he made his debut for RB Linense when replacing the unavailable Francisco Javier Mateo and being preferred over Emmanuel Sanchez.

=== Lynx and Europa ===
Following Gibraltar's acceptance into UEFA, the Premier Division was allocated one place in both the Champions League and Europa League qualification rounds. As a result, Robba joined Lynx in July 2013 in an attempt to secure European football, but could only achieve a third-place finish. Lincoln Red Imps and Europa claimed the available spots.

In July 2014, he joined Europa in order to feature in their Europa League campaign. As the lowest ranked club of the competition, Europa were unseeded in Group Two and would go on to face Liechtenstein club FC Vaduz in the first qualifying round. Robba was an unused substitute in the 3–0 first leg defeat, before starting in a 1–0 second leg defeat and conceding in the 89th minute. However, he went on to finish second in the Gibraltar Premier Division while lifting the Gibraltar Premier Cup. Robba was also named as the Golden Glove winner after keeping the most clean sheets during the 2014–15 campaign. He terminated his contract at the end of the season.

=== US Le Pontet and return to Lynx ===
Linked to clubs in France and Bulgarian side Lokomotiv Plovdiv in the following weeks, Robba signed a two-year contract with fourth division club US Le Pontet in July 2015. After five months in France, Robba decided to terminate his contract with the club. Initially signed by the sporting director, he struggled to fit into the manager's plans as the second choice goalkeeper and left by mutual consent in November 2015.

Following his release, he returned home to Gibraltar and began training with Lincoln Red Imps. After discussions with the club, he revealed his ambition to play abroad once again and would not enter contract negotiations. However, he re-joined Lynx on an emergency loan for a second spell three weeks later. With the club's first choice goalkeeper ruled out through injury, manager Albert Parody called upon the services of Robba, his nephew, until the transfer window opened. The deal included an agreement that he could terminate his loan at any time should another club show interest.

=== Torquay United and St Joseph's ===
After being spotted by assistant manager Robbie Herrera, National League side Torquay United offered Robba a one-week trial in July 2016. On 25 July, it was announced that he had signed a one-year deal with the English club to compete with first choice goalkeeper Brendan Moore. The deal was confirmed subject to international clearance. On 27 January 2017, Robba left the Gulls by mutual consent, with both the club and the player citing lack of playing time and his loss of the #1 jersey for the national team as a reason for his departure. The same day, he signed for St Joseph's, the club where he began his career as a youth team player. However, Torquay manager Kevin Nicholson refused to rule out bringing the keeper back in future. He made his debut in a 2-0 victory over Manchester 62 on February 18. He kept a clean sheet in each of his first 3 games as the Saints continued their push for Europa League qualification. The next season, he became first choice at the club, and his 9 clean sheets throughout the season helped him earn the Golden Glove at the end of May 2019, tied with Javi Muñoz. He was also awarded "Goalkeeper of the Season" in Football Gibraltar's end of season awards.

== International career ==
Robba made his international debut in a 1–0 victory over Malta on 4 June 2014, appearing from the bench for seven minutes and was later called up to the Gibraltar squad for the 2016 European Championships Qualifiers. Being named on the bench in the opening fixture, he played 30 minutes in a 7–0 defeat to the Republic of Ireland – keeping a clean sheet during his time on the pitch. His performances soon saw him become the first choice goalkeeper, while being noted for a string of impressive stops against the world champions to restrict Germany to a 4–0 victory.

== International statistics ==
As of 1 October 2016

National team	Season	Apps	Goals
Gibraltar	2014	4	0
Gibraltar	2015	3	0
Gibraltar	2016	1	0
Total		8	0
