= Lions Gibraltar F.C. =

Association football club in Gibraltar

Lions Gibraltar
- Full name: Lions Gibraltar Football Club
- Short name: Lions
- Founded: 1966
- Ground: Victoria Stadium, Winston Churchill Avenue Gibraltar
- Capacity: 2,300
- Chairman: Darryl Eales
- Manager: Wally Downes
- League: Gibraltar Football League
- 2025–26: 5th
- Website: www.lionsgibraltarfc.com
Home colours	Away colours

Lions Gibraltar is a professional football club in Gibraltar. They play in the country's top-level league, the Gibraltar Football League.

They were created by a merger of Gibraltar United F.C. and Lions FC in 2011. Aside from their first team, they also run an intermediate (under-23) team, several youth teams, futsal teams and a women's team.

== History ==
Lions Gibraltar was founded as Lions Football Club in 1966 when a group of friends decided to take up a team after the euphoria of England winning the 1966 World Cup, thus the three lions on its club badge. After a quiet 45-year history, the club merged with league giants Gibraltar United in 2011 to create a much stronger side.

Their time together saw the side consistently compete in the Gibraltar Premier Division, and the side continued this upon the GFA's admittance to UEFA in 2013. The 2013–14 season, their final season united with Gibraltar United, saw them narrowly avoid a relegation playoff with a 6th-place finish. After this, Gibraltar United joined the Gibraltar Second Division and Lions restructured, with English coach Jeff Wood appointed manager with ambitions to challenge the top sides and qualify for the UEFA Europa League. In February 2015 the club announced plans to become a feeder club with Premier League club Swansea City, although these plans eventually fell through.

However, after a disappointing season in which the club finished bottom of the league (avoiding relegation due to the league's expansion), the club announced in July 2015 that it was to be taken over by Hercules Sports Promotion, Ltd, headed by Andrew Flowers (who had previously attempted to purchase Leeds United in 2013). Significant investment by the new ownership meant that Lions would now become a semi-professional club with the aim of toppling Lincoln Red Imps' dominance. The following season saw immediate improvement, with the club finishing 4th, however they remained significantly off the pace compared to the region's top two sides Lincoln Red Imps and Europa.

On 31 May, the board announced former national team coach David Wilson as their new manager for the 2016–17 season. However, after the collapse of the club owners' other companies left Lions' future uncertain, Wilson resigned before the beginning of the season to take over at FCB Magpies and the previous season's co-caretaker Rafael Bado was announced as manager. A season spent primarily in the bottom two ended in safety, however, after an upturn in form from the beginning of 2017 despite only winning one game in the first 4 months of the season.

On 28 January 2024, it was announced that Solihull Moors CEO Mark Palmer had purchased a controlling stake in the club, becoming owner and chairman.

=== Seasons (since UEFA acceptance) ===
Season	Division	League record								Rock Cup
Season	Division	P	W	D	L	GF	GA	Pts	Pos	Rock Cup
2013–14	Premier	14	4	2	8	23	33	14	6th	Semi-final
2014–15	Premier	21	1	5	15	9	48	8	8th	Quarter-final
2015–16	Premier	27	14	3	10	49	44	45	4th	Semi-final
2016–17	Premier	27	4	9	14	17	54	21	8th	Quarter-final
2017–18	Premier	27	6	5	16	27	63	23	8th	Second round
2018–19	Premier	27	3	0	24	17	77	9	9th	Quarter-final
2019–20	National	20	4	4	12	13	33	16	6th (Note: Season abandoned due to the COVID-19 pandemic)	Quarter-final
2020–21	National	20	4	4	12	13	33	16	6th	First round
2021–22	National	18	1	5	12	13	45	8	11th	Quarter-final
2022–23	GFL	18	5	4	9	25	37	19	8th	First round
2023–24	GFL	20	3	4	13	16	50	13	10th	Quarter-final
2024–25	GFL	25	8	4	13	35	49	28	6th	Runners-up

== Current squad ==
=== First team ===
As of 30 July 2026

Note: Flags indicate national team as defined under FIFA eligibility rules; some limited exceptions apply. Players may hold more than one non-FIFA nationality.

No.	Pos.	Nation	Player
1	GK	ESP	Nando
2	DF	GIB	Evan Busto
3	DF	MAR	Saber Bchari
4	DF	ENG	Tyler Garratt
5	DF	AUS	James Nikolovski
6	MF	GIB	Frankie Perry (on loan from St Joseph's)
7	MF	GIB	Kye Livingstone
8	MF	ENG	Raynner Marques Silva
9	FW	ENG	Mikael Ndjoli
10	MF	GIB	Ben Seaton (captain)
11	MF	GIB	Yaseen Elmanasra
12	FW	ARG	Lucas Rebagliati

No.	Pos.	Nation	Player
14	FW	GBS	Deimar Queni
15	GK	GIB	Jordan Perez (player-assistant coach)
16	DF	BEL	Moussa Duranville
17	FW	ENG	Alex Taylor
18	DF	SEN	Pape Ly
19	MF	GIB	Jaydan Parody
20	DF	GIB	Shea Breakspear
21	MF	GIB	Matthew Plumb
22	DF	GIB	James Chiles-Cowell
24	MF	GIB	Omar Errouas
25	GK	POL	Maks Klugowski

== Club staff ==
Position	Name
Club Management
Head coach	(England) Wally Downes
Assistant coach	(Gibraltar) Jordan Perez
Head Physio	(Hungary) Kopi Godri
Fitness Coach	(Gibraltar) Justin Santos
Sports Therapist	(Gibraltar) Luke Henshaw
Board
Chairman	(England) Darryl Eales
Director	(England) James Pickering (England) Gary Holliday
Club Secretary	(Gibraltar) Kadrian Bugeja
Head of Operations	(Gibraltar) Alex Grech
Head of Communications	(England) Sharon Millar
Head of Facilities	(Gibraltar) Daniel Buhagiar

== See also ==
- Lions Gibraltar F.C. Women
