= Juanfri =

Spanish footballer

Personal information
- Full name: Juan Francisco García Peña
- Date of birth: 1 October 1989 (age 37)
- Place of birth: Fuengirola, Spain
- Height: 1.81 m (5 ft 11 in)
- Position: Striker

Team information
- Current team: St Joseph's
- Number: 19

Youth career
- 2005–2006: Fuengirola
- 2006–2007: Murcia
- 2007–2008: Fuengirola

Senior career*
| Years | Team | Apps | (Gls) |
| 2006 | Fuengirola | 7 | (5) |
| 2007–2008 | Fuengirola | 9 | (0) |
| 2008–2009 | Estepona | 35 | (13) |
| 2009–2012 | Málaga B | 94 | (40) |
| 2010 | Málaga | 0 | (0) |
| 2012–2013 | Écija | 10 | (1) |
| 2013 | Sporting Goa | 9 | (2) |
| 2013–2014 | Écija | 29 | (5) |
| 2014–2015 | San Pedro | 33 | (18) |
| 2015–2016 | Marbella | 31 | (9) |
| 2016 | Lincoln Red Imps | 0 | (0) |
| 2016–2017 | Saburtalo | 11 | (2) |
| 2017–2018 | Antequera | 49 | (15) |
| 2018–2022 | St Joseph's | 80 | (81) |
| 2022–2024 | Lincoln Red Imps | 37 | (38) |
| 2024– | St Joseph's | 38 | (17) |
- * Club domestic league appearances and goals as of 08:50, 11 April 2026 (UTC)

Juan Francisco García Peña (born 1 October 1989), known as Juanfri, is a Spanish footballer who plays for Gibraltarian club St Joseph's as a striker.

== Club career ==
=== Early years and Málaga ===
Born in Fuengirola, Province of Málaga, Juanfri made his senior debut at the age of just 16 with local club UD Fuengirola Los Boliches in the Tercera División, scoring a hat-trick in a 9–0 win against Úbeda CF. In the 2008–09 season he moved to another modest side in Andalusia, Unión Estepona CF, partnering former Málaga CF legend Catanha up front, and both were instrumental as they first promoted to Segunda División B; in the process, he netted the team's first-ever goal in the fourth tier of Spanish football.

Juanfri signed with Málaga in July 2009, being assigned to the reserves in division four. He made his first-team debut on 7 January 2010, in a 2–1 home defeat of Getafe CF in the round of 16 of the Copa del Rey.

=== Sporting Goa ===
Juanfri did not appear in any more competitive games for Málaga and, in summer 2012, left for neighbouring Écija Balompié in the third division. On 31 January 2013, however, he moved abroad and joined I-League franchise Sporting Clube de Goa until the end of the season.

Juanfri made his first appearance for his new team on 1 February 2013, being replaced in the 81st minute of the fixture against Churchill Brothers SC (1–0 home victory). He scored his first goal on 20 March, equalising an eventual 3–1 win at Salgaocar FC through a penalty.

In June 2013, Juanfri was released. He went on to resume his career in his country's lower leagues.

=== Later career ===
Early into the 2017 January transfer window, Juanfri left FC Saburtalo Tbilisi from Georgia and joined Tercera División club Antequera CF. On 3 August 2018, he signed for St Joseph's in Gibraltar, where he formed an efficient attacking partnership with his compatriot Salva Boro; in 2020, he led a list of Spanish players abroad by scoring 21 goals in a calendar year.

== Career statistics ==
As of match played on 27 May 2018

| Club | Season | League | | | Cup | | Other | | Total | |
| Club | Season | Division | Apps | Goals | Apps | Goals | Apps | Goals | Apps | Goals |
|---|---|---|---|---|---|---|---|---|---|---|
| Fuengirola | 2005–06 | Tercera División | 7 | 5 | 0 | 0 | — | | 7 | 5 |
| Fuengirola | 2007–08 | Tercera División | 9 | 0 | 0 | 0 | — | | 9 | 0 |
| Fuengirola | Total | | 16 | 5 | 0 | 0 | — | | 16 | 5 |
| Estepona | 2008–09 | Tercera División | 35 | 13 | 0 | 0 | — | | 35 | 3 |
| Málaga B | 2009–10 | Tercera División | 32 | 13 | — | | — | | 32 | 13 |
| Málaga B | 2010–11 | Tercera División | 32 | 13 | — | | 2 (Note: Appearances in Tercera División relegation play-offs) | 0 | 34 | 13 |
| Málaga B | 2011–12 | Tercera División | 30 | 14 | — | | — | | 30 | 14 |
| Málaga B | Total | | 94 | 40 | — | | 2 | 0 | 96 | 40 |
| Málaga | 2010–11 | La Liga | 0 | 0 | 1 | 0 | — | | 1 | 0 |
| Écija | 2012–13 | Segunda División B | 10 | 1 | 0 | 0 | — | | 10 | 1 |
| Sporting Goa | 2012–13 | I-League | 9 | 2 | 0 | 0 | — | | 9 | 2 |
| Écija | 2013–14 | Segunda División B | 29 | 5 | 1 | 0 | — | | 30 | 5 |
| San Pedro | 2014–15 | Tercera División | 33 | 18 | 0 | 0 | 6 | 3 | 39 | 21 |
| Marbella | 2015–16 | Segunda División B | 31 | 9 | 0 | 0 | — | | 31 | 9 |
| Lincoln Red Imps | 2016–17 | Gibraltar Premier Division | 0 | 0 | 0 | 0 | 1 (Note: Appearance in UEFA Europa League) | 0 | 1 | 0 |
| Saburtalo | 2016 | Umaglesi Liga | 11 | 2 | 1 | 0 | — | | 12 | 2 |
| Antequera | 2016–17 | Tercera División | 16 | 2 | 0 | 0 | 3 | 1 | 19 | 3 |
| Antequera | 2017–18 | Tercera División | 33 | 13 | 1 | 0 | 2 | 0 | 36 | 13 |
| Antequera | Total | | 49 | 15 | 1 | 0 | 5 | 1 | 54 | 16 |
| Career total | | | 317 | 110 | 4 | 0 | 14 | 4 | 335 | 114 |
