= 2022–23 Gibraltar Intermediate League =

Fifth season of under-23 football in Gibraltar

Gibraltar Intermediate League
- Season: 2022–23
- Dates: 6 September 2022 – TBC
- Champions: Manchester 62 Intermediate (2nd title)
- Matches: 54
- Goals: 253 (4.69 per match)
- Top goalscorer: Ashton Wahnon (10 goals)
- Best goalkeeper: Ben Maidens; Jake Victor (3 clean sheets)
- All statistics correct as of 5 January 2023.

The 2022–23 Gibraltar Intermediate League is the fifth season of under-23 football in Gibraltar, after reforms to reserve team football in June 2018. The league will be contested by 11 teams - ten under-23 sides of the Gibraltar Football League clubs plus Hound Dogs.

Manchester 62 are the reigning champions. The league kicked off on 6 September 2022.

== Format ==
The Gibraltar Intermediate League was established by the Gibraltar Football Association in June 2018 as a merger of the pre-existing Reserves Division and Under 18 Division, in order to aid player development on the territory. Competing clubs are required to register a reserve squad of 18 players, of which 13 must be Gibraltarian.

== Teams ==
Location of the stadium where all teams play

Mons Calpe declined to enter a team this season, taking the number of teams down to 11. Due to the lack of resources necessary to compete in the Gibraltar Football League, Hound Dogs were granted special permission by the Gibraltar FA to participate as a senior side in the Intermediate League.

Note: Flags indicate national team as has been defined under FIFA eligibility rules. Players may hold more than one non-FIFA nationality.

| Team | Manager | Captain | Kit manufacturer | Club sponsor |
|---|---|---|---|---|
| Bruno's Magpies Intermediate | (England) Neil Ross | | Macron | Chestertons |
| College 1975 Intermediate | (Gibraltar) Ezzard Mir | (Gibraltar) Christopher Parkinson | Joma | |
| Europa Intermediate | (Gibraltar) Edgar Harrison | (Gibraltar) Sam Yeo | Kappa | Situs Construction |
| Europa Point Intermediate | (Republic of Ireland) Ryan McCarthy | (Gibraltar) Johnny Barceló | TBC | Cargo Care |
| Glacis United Intermediate | (Netherlands) Bennie Brinkman | (Gibraltar) Joseph Chipolina | Macron | |
| Hound Dogs | (Gibraltar) Chris Gomez | (Gibraltar) Ivan Borg | Joma | The Calpe Hounds |
| Lincoln Red Imps Intermediate | (Gibraltar) Tarik Chrayeh | (Gibraltar) Kyle Clinton | Givova | Damex |
| Lions Gibraltar Intermediate | (Gibraltar) Adrian Parral | (Gibraltar) Leon Payas | Macron | |
| Lynx Intermediate | (Spain) José Navas | (Gibraltar) Jonathan Molina | Givova | Grupo Casais |
| Manchester 62 Intermediate | (Scotland) Ross Gray | (Gibraltar) Kieron Garcia | Macron | CEPSA GIB |
| St Joseph's Intermediate | (Republic of Ireland) Kane Forster | (Gibraltar) Jesse Clinton | Legea | |

== League table ==
| Pos | Team | Pld | W | D | L | GF | GA | GD | Pts |
|---|---|---|---|---|---|---|---|---|---|
| 1 | Manchester 62 Intermediate (C) | 10 | 10 | 0 | 0 | 44 | 3 | +41 | 30 |
| 2 | Glacis United Intermediate | 10 | 8 | 0 | 2 | 44 | 8 | +36 | 24 |
| 3 | College 1975 Intermediate | 10 | 8 | 0 | 2 | 40 | 18 | +22 | 24 |
| 4 | Europa Intermediate | 10 | 5 | 2 | 3 | 23 | 16 | +7 | 17 |
| 5 | Lincoln Red Imps Intermediate | 10 | 4 | 1 | 5 | 13 | 22 | −9 | 13 |
| 6 | Bruno's Magpies Intermediate | 10 | 4 | 1 | 5 | 23 | 44 | −21 | 13 |
| 7 | Lynx Intermediate | 10 | 3 | 2 | 5 | 16 | 21 | −5 | 11 |
| 8 | Europa Point Intermediate | 9 | 3 | 0 | 6 | 16 | 25 | −9 | 9 |
| 9 | Lions Gibraltar Intermediate | 10 | 2 | 1 | 7 | 12 | 31 | −19 | 7 |
| 10 | St Joseph's Intermediate | 9 | 2 | 0 | 7 | 12 | 39 | −27 | 6 |
| 11 | Hound Dogs | 10 | 1 | 1 | 8 | 10 | 26 | −16 | 4 |

Updated to match(es) played on 5 January 2023. Source: Gibraltar FA
Rules for classification: 1) Points; 2) Goal difference; 3) Goals scored.
(C) Champions

== Season statistics ==
=== Scoring ===
==== Top scorers ====
| Rank | Player | Club | Goals |
|---|---|---|---|
| 1 | (Gibraltar) Ashton Wahnon | Bruno's Magpies Intermediate | 10 |
| 2 | (Gibraltar) Stefan Viagas | Manchester 62 Intermediate | 9 |
| 3 | (Canada) Arjun Mann | Glacis United Intermediate | 6 |
| 4 | (Lithuania) Edvinas Valatka | Glacis United Intermediate | 5 |
| 4 | (Gibraltar) Lee Chipolina | Lincoln Red Imps Intermediate | 5 |
| 4 | (Gibraltar) Kevan Gonzalez | Manchester 62 Intermediate | 5 |
| 4 | (Gibraltar) Theo Pizarro | Manchester 62 Intermediate | 5 |
| 8 | (Gibraltar) Christian Mason | Bruno's Magpies Intermediate | 4 |
| 8 | (Spain) Germán Cortés | College 1975 Intermediate | 4 |
| 8 | (Gibraltar) Adam Gracia | College 1975 Intermediate | 4 |
| 8 | (Spain) Pollo | College 1975 Intermediate | 4 |
| 8 | (Portugal) Sergio Nascimento | Europa Intermediate | 4 |
| 8 | (Gibraltar) Kyle Rodriguez | Europa Intermediate | 4 |
| 8 | (Gibraltar) Matthew Plumb | Europa Point Intermediate | 4 |
| 8 | (Gibraltar) Oli Williams | Glacis United Intermediate | 4 |
| 8 | (Gibraltar) Aiden Olivares | Lynx Intermediate | 4 |

==== Clean Sheets ====
| Rank | Player | Club | Clean sheets |
|---|---|---|---|
| 1 | (England) Ben Maidens | Manchester 62 Intermediate | 3 |
| 1 | (Gibraltar) Jake Victor | College 1975 Intermediate | 3 |
| 3 | (United States) Leeor Brounchtine | College 1975 Intermediate | 2 |
| 3 | (Netherlands) Quinn Johnson | Glacis United Intermediate | 2 |
| 3 | (Spain) Miguel Cereceda | Lynx Intermediate | 2 |
| 3 | (Gibraltar) Leigh Rae | Lynx Intermediate | 2 |
| 3 | (Gibraltar) Owen Bosano | St Joseph's Intermediate^{1} | 2 |
| 8 | (Spain) Edu Oliva | College 1975 Intermediate | 1 |
| 8 | (Spain) José González | Europa Intermediate | 1 |
| 8 | (Gibraltar) Jesse Gonzalez | Europa Point Intermediate | 1 |
| 8 | (Gibraltar) Luke Bautista | Glacis United Intermediate | 1 |
| 8 | (Italy) Giuseppe Domanico | Glacis United Intermediate | 1 |
| 8 | (Netherlands) André Krul | Glacis United Intermediate | 1 |
| 8 | (Gibraltar) Ethan Llambias | Glacis United Intermediate | 1 |
| 8 | (Spain) Juan Carcaño | Hound Dogs | 1 |
| 8 | (Gibraltar) Lee Mifsud | Lincoln Red Imps Intermediate | 1 |
| 8 | (Spain) Juan Muñoz | Lions Gibraltar Intermediate | 1 |
| 8 | (Scotland) Ross Gray | Manchester 62 Intermediate | 1 |
| 8 | (Gibraltar) Ayden Vinales | Manchester 62 Intermediate | 1 |
| 8 | (Gibraltar) Soufiane El Morabet | St Joseph's Intermediate | 1 |

^{1}Includes one clean sheet for Europa Intermediate

== See also ==
- 2022–23 Gibraltar Football League
- 2022–23 Gibraltar Women's Football League
