= Lee Casciaro =

Gibraltarian footballer

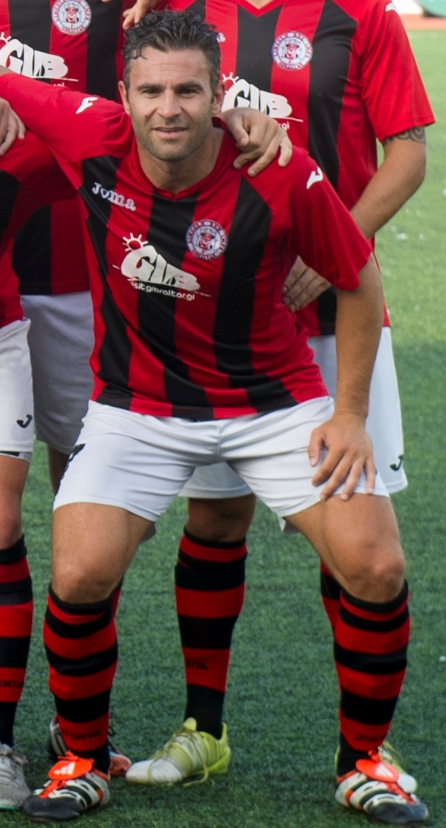
- Casciaro with Lincoln Red Imps in 2015

Personal information
- Full name: Lee Henry Casciaro
- Date of birth: 29 September 1981 (age 45)
- Place of birth: Gibraltar
- Height: 1.75 m (5 ft 9 in)
- Position: Forward

Team information
- Current team: Lincoln Red Imps
- Number: 7

Youth career
- 1988–1998: Lincoln Red Imps

Senior career*
Years	Team	Apps	(Gls)
1998– (Note: Pre-UEFA Gibraltar football stats before 2013 are unknown)	Lincoln Red Imps	190+	(72+)

International career
2002–2011	Gibraltar XI (Non-FIFA)	12	(12)
2014–2026	Gibraltar	67	(3)
- * Club domestic league appearances and goals as of 25 April 2026

Lee Henry Casciaro (born 29 September 1981) is a Gibraltarian professional footballer and police officer who plays as a forward for Gibraltar Premier Division club Lincoln Red Imps.

A one-club man, Casciaro also has the record for the player with most years at the same club, spending 28 years at Lincoln, making over 190 appearances for the club. With 62 titles won with Lincoln recognized by UEFA, Casciaro has the record for most titles with one club, most club titles, and most titles in association football.

Casciaro made his senior debut for the Gibraltar national team in 2014, when the nation was first recognised by UEFA. Between 2019 and 2022, he was Gibraltar's all-time leading scorer since joining UEFA, with three goals.

== Club career ==
Casciaro joined the youth team of Lincoln Red Imps in 1988 and he made his senior debut for Lincoln Red Imps in 1998. His highest scoring seasons were 2014–15 and 2015–16 when he scored 20 goals.

On 7 July 2015, Casciaro scored the winning goal as Lincoln Red Imps came from behind to win 2–1 away to FC Santa Coloma in the UEFA Champions League first qualifying round, advancing on aggregate by the same score to become the first Gibraltarian team to advance into the second qualifying round. On 12 July 2016, he scored the only goal in a 1–0 Red Imps victory over Celtic in the first leg of the 2nd qualifying round of the UEFA Champions League.

On 12 July 2022, he became the oldest player to score in any round of the Champions League or European Cup at the age of 40 years and 286 days. Casciaro's record-breaking goal came against KF Shkupi in the first qualifying round.

In June 2026, Casciaro extended his contract with the club until the end of the 2026–27 season.

== International career ==
On 7 September 2014, Casciaro made his international debut for Gibraltar in a UEFA Euro 2016 Group D qualifying match against Poland with Gibraltar losing 7–0 at the Estádio Algarve. He had played for the official team since 2007, scoring 9 goals in 7 appearances, but these appearances were considered unofficial upon Gibraltar's entry to UEFA in 2013. On 29 March 2015, he scored Gibraltar's first ever goal in a full international competitive match; netting an equaliser against Scotland in a 6–1 European qualification loss at Hampden Park, Glasgow. For his services to sport in Gibraltar, he was awarded the Gibraltar Medallion of Distinction in August 2019. He captained Gibraltar for the first time against Liechtenstein on 10 October 2020, aged 39.

On 24 March 2023, a 41-year-old Casciaro became the oldest ever player to appear at a UEFA European Championship qualifying match in a 3–0 defeat to Greece, although the record had initially been misattributed to Swedish striker Zlatan Ibrahimović, who played the same day yet is 4 days younger than Casciaro, but a 43-year-old Ildefons Lima of Andorra broke his record on 16 June 2023.

On 21 May 2026, it was announced that Casciaro would play his final international match for Gibraltar on 3 June, in a friendly against the British Virgin Islands which Gibraltar won 4–0.

== Personal life ==
Casciaro is a policeman for the Gibraltar Defence Police. His brothers Kyle and Ryan have also played with Gibraltar's national side.

== Career statistics ==
=== Club ===
As of match played 25 April 2026

Known appearances and goals by club, season and competition
Club	Season	League			Rock Cup		Pepe Reyes Cup		Europe		Total	
Club	Season	Division	Apps	Goals	Apps	Goals	Apps	Goals	Apps	Goals	Apps	Goals
Lincoln Red Imps	1998–99 to 2013–14	Gibraltar Premier Division	?	?	?	?	?	?	—		?	?
Lincoln Red Imps	2014–15	Gibraltar Premier Division	20	19	4	1	0	0	2 (Note: Appearances in UEFA Champions League)	0	26	20
Lincoln Red Imps	2015–16	Gibraltar Premier Division	18	17	2	0	1	2	4	1	25	20
Lincoln Red Imps	2016–17	Gibraltar Premier Division	25	13	4	2	1	0	4	1	34	16
Lincoln Red Imps	2017–18	Gibraltar Premier Division	13	5	3	0	1	0	2 (Note: Appearances in UEFA Europa League)	0	19	5
Lincoln Red Imps	2018–19	Gibraltar Premier Division	17	4	1	0	1	0	3 (Note: Two appearances in UEFA Champions League, one appearance in UEFA Europa League)	0	22	4
Lincoln Red Imps	2019–20	Gibraltar Football League	14	2	2	0	0	0	0	0	16	2
Lincoln Red Imps	2020–21	Gibraltar Football League	7	1	4	3	0	0	2	1	12	5
Lincoln Red Imps	2021–22	Gibraltar Football League	18	4	3	0	0	0	9 (Note: Four appearances in UEFA Champions League, two appearances in UEFA Europa League, three appearance in UEFA Europa Conference League)	0	30	4
Lincoln Red Imps	2022–23	Gibraltar Football League	14	2	3	0	1	0	4 (Note: Two appearances and one goal in UEFA Champions League, two appearances in UEFA Europa Conference League)	1	22	3
Lincoln Red Imps	2023–24	Gibraltar Football League	21	3	3	1	1	0	2	0	27	4
Lincoln Red Imps	2024–25	Gibraltar Football League	17	1	0	0	0	0	7 (Note: Three appearances in UEFA Champions League, two appearances in UEFA Europa League, two appearances in UEFA Conference League)	0	24	1
Lincoln Red Imps	2025–26	Gibraltar Football League	6	1	1	0	1	0	2 (Note: One appearance in UEFA Europa League, one appearance in UEFA Conference League)	0	10	1
Lincoln Red Imps	Total		190+	72+	30+	7+	7+	2+	41	4	268+	85+
Lincoln Red Imps Intermediate	2018–19	Gibraltar Intermediate League	1	0	—		—		—		1	0
Lincoln Red Imps Intermediate	2020–21	Gibraltar Intermediate League	1	0	—		—		—		1	0
Lincoln Red Imps Intermediate	2023–24	Gibraltar Intermediate League	1 (Note: Appearance in Gibraltar Intermediate Cup)	2	—		—		—		1	2
Lincoln Red Imps Intermediate	Total		3	2	—		—		—		3	2
Career total			193+	74+	30+	7+	7+	2+	41	4	271+	87+

=== International ===
Appearances and goals by national team and year
National team	Year	Apps	Goals
Gibraltar XI (non-FIFA)	2002	1	1
Gibraltar XI (non-FIFA)	2003	1	2
Gibraltar XI (non-FIFA)	2004	0	0
Gibraltar XI (non-FIFA)	2005	0	0
Gibraltar XI (non-FIFA)	2006	2	0
Gibraltar XI (non-FIFA)	2007	0	0
Gibraltar XI (non-FIFA)	2008	0	0
Gibraltar XI (non-FIFA)	2009	3	5
Gibraltar XI (non-FIFA)	2010	0	0
Gibraltar XI (non-FIFA)	2011	5	4
Gibraltar XI (non-FIFA)	Total	12	12
Gibraltar	2014	4	0
Gibraltar	2015	6	1
Gibraltar	2016	4	1
Gibraltar	2017	4	0
Gibraltar	2018	7	0
Gibraltar	2019	8	1
Gibraltar	2020	4	0
Gibraltar	2021	6	0
Gibraltar	2022	10	0
Gibraltar	2023	8	0
Gibraltar	2024	5	0
Gibraltar	2025	0	0
Gibraltar	2026	1	0
Gibraltar	Total	67	3
Career total		79	15

Scores and results list Gibraltar's goal tally first, score column indicates score after each Casciaro goal.

List of non-FIFA international goals scored by Lee Casciaro
No.	Date	Venue	Cap	Opponent	Score	Result	Competition
1	28 February 2002	Stade Municipal Cap-d'Ail, Cap-d'Ail, France	1	Monaco	2–2	2–2	Friendly
2	29 June 2006	Blanche Pierre Lane, Saint Martin, Guernsey	2	Sark	4–0	19–0	2003 Island Games
3	29 June 2006	Blanche Pierre Lane, Saint Martin, Guernsey	2	Sark	8–0	19–0	2003 Island Games
4	29 June 2009	Solvallen, Eckerö, Åland	6	Frøya	1–0	8–0	2009 Island Games
5	29 June 2009	Solvallen, Eckerö, Åland	6	Frøya	4–0	8–0	2009 Island Games
6	29 June 2009	Solvallen, Eckerö, Åland	6	Frøya	5–0	8–0	2009 Island Games
7	3 July 2009	Vikingavalenn, Jomala, Åland	7	Isle of Wight	1–0	3–0	2009 Island Games
8	3 July 2009	Vikingavalenn, Jomala, Åland	7	Isle of Wight	2–0	3–0	2009 Island Games
9	26 June 2011	St George's Park, Newport, Isle of Wight	9	Alderney	4–0	6–1	2011 Island Games
10	26 June 2011	St George's Park, Newport, Isle of Wight	9	Alderney	5–0	6–1	2011 Island Games
11	28 June 2011	Vicarage Lane, Brading, Isle of Wight	10	Ynys Môn	2–0	6–3	2011 Island Games
12	28 June 2011	Vicarage Lane, Brading, Isle of Wight	10	Ynys Môn	6–3	6–3	2011 Island Games

Scores and results list Gibraltar's goal tally first, score column indicates score after each Casciaro goal.

List of international goals scored by Lee Casciaro
No.	Date	Venue	Cap	Opponent	Score	Result	Competition
1	29 March 2014	Hampden Park, Glasgow, Scotland	5	Scotland	1–1	1–6	UEFA Euro 2016 qualification
2	13 November 2016	GSP Stadium, Nicosia, Cyprus	14	Cyprus	1–1	1–3	2018 FIFA World Cup qualification
3	15 October 2019	GSP Stadium, Nicosia, Cyprus	31	Georgia	1–2	2–3	UEFA Euro 2020 qualification

== Honours ==
Lincoln Red Imps

- Gibraltar League (23): 2000–01, 2002–03, 2003–04, 2004–05, 2005–06, 2006–07, 2007–08, 2008–09, 2009–10, 2010–11, 2011–12, 2012–13, 2013–14, 2014–15, 2015–16, 2017–18, 2018–19, 2020–21, 2021–22, 2022–23, 2023–24, 2024–25, 2025–26
- Rock Cup (16): 2001–02, 2003–04, 2004–05, 2005–06, 2006–07, 2007–08, 2008–09, 2009–10, 2010–11, 2014, 2015, 2016, 2021, 2021–22, 2023–24, 2025–26
- Pepe Reyes Cup (13): 2001, 2002, 2004, 2007, 2008, 2009, 2010, 2011, 2014, 2015, 2017, 2022, 2025
- Gibraltar Premier Cup (11): 1999–2000, 2001–02, 2002–03, 2003–04, 2004–05, 2005–06, 2006–07, 2007–08, 2010–11, 2011–12, 2013–14

== See also ==
- List of world association football records
- List of one-club men in football
