= 2021–22 Gibraltar Intermediate League =

Football season in Gibraltar

Gibraltar Intermediate League
- Season: 2021–22
- Dates: 18 October 2021 – TBC
- Top goalscorer: Ashton Wahnon (11 goals)
- Best goalkeeper: 6 players (2 clean sheets)
- All statistics correct as of 21 April 2022.

The 2021–22 Gibraltar Intermediate League is the fourth season of under-23 football in Gibraltar, after reforms to reserve team football in June 2018. The league will be contested by 12 teams - the eleven under-23 sides of the Gibraltar National League clubs plus Hound Dogs, and is set to begin on 18 October 2021. There are no reigning champions due to the previous season's abandonment.

== Format ==
The Gibraltar Intermediate League was established by the Gibraltar Football Association in June 2018 as a merger of the pre-existing Reserves Division and Under 18 Division, in order to aid player development on the territory. Competing clubs are required to register a reserve squad of 18 players, of which 13 must be Gibraltarian.

== Teams ==
Location of the stadium where all teams play

Manchester 62 returned to the league after a one-year absence, while Europa Point make their debut at U23 level, meaning that all 11 Gibraltar National League sides entered the Intermediate League for the first time. Due to the lack of resources necessary to compete in the new Gibraltar National League, Hound Dogs were granted special permission by the Gibraltar FA to participate as a senior side in the Intermediate League.

Note: Flags indicate national team as has been defined under FIFA eligibility rules. Players may hold more than one non-FIFA nationality.

Team	Manager	Captain	Kit manufacturer	Club sponsor
Bruno's Magpies Intermediate	(Gibraltar) Johnny Thicke		VIVE	Rosso Corsa
College 1975 Intermediate	(Gibraltar) Tarik Chrayeh	(Gibraltar) Angel Field	Joma	
Europa Intermediate	(Gibraltar) Jonathan Sodi	(Gibraltar) Peter Cabezutto	Kappa	
Europa Point Intermediate	(Gibraltar) Garry Lowe	(Gibraltar) Felix Formica-Corsi	Hope + Glory	Marbella Ketones
Glacis United Intermediate	(Netherlands) Bennie Brinkman	(Gibraltar) James Castle	Nike	
Hound Dogs	(Gibraltar) Chris Gomez	(Gibraltar) Ivan Borg	Joma	The Calpe Hounds
Lincoln Red Imps Intermediate	(Gibraltar) Malcolm Martin	(Gibraltar) Kian Ronan	Givova	Mansion
Lions Gibraltar Intermediate	(Spain) Alberto Ferri	(Gibraltar) Jaydan Catania	Macron	
Lynx Intermediate	(Spain) Carlos Gobantes	(Gibraltar) Francis Huart Guerra	Givova	Grupo Casais
Manchester 62 Intermediate	(Gibraltar) Andrew Horsey	(Gibraltar) Scott Ballantine	Joma	CEPSA GIB
Mons Calpe Intermediate	(Argentina) Claudio Racino		Givova	FanPlay 365
St Joseph's Intermediate	(Gibraltar) Chisum Sanchez	(Gibraltar) Harry Victor	Legea	

== League table ==
Pos	Team	Pld	W	D	L	GF	GA	GD	Pts
1	Manchester 62 Intermediate	11	10	1	0	46	9	+37	31
2	Glacis United Intermediate	10	8	1	1	42	8	+34	25
3	Lynx Intermediate	11	8	1	2	31	15	+16	25
4	Bruno's Magpies Intermediate	11	7	0	4	42	25	+17	21
5	Lincoln Red Imps Intermediate	11	6	1	4	34	31	+3	19
6	College 1975 Intermediate	11	5	1	5	23	21	+2	16
7	Europa Intermediate	11	5	0	6	24	20	+4	15
8	Lions Gibraltar Intermediate	11	3	3	5	14	26	−12	12
9	Europa Point Intermediate	10	3	1	6	18	36	−18	10
10	Hound Dogs	11	1	2	8	14	36	−22	5
11	St Joseph's Intermediate	11	1	1	9	8	35	−27	4
12	Mons Calpe Intermediate	11	0	4	7	11	45	−34	4

Updated to match(es) played on 21 April 2022. Source: Gibraltar FA
Rules for classification: 1) Points; 2) Goal difference; 3) Goals scored.

== Season statistics ==
=== Scoring ===
==== Top scorers ====
Rank	Player	Club	Goals
1	(Gibraltar) Ashton Wahnon	Bruno's Magpies Intermediate	15
2	(Gibraltar) Kadrian Verjaque^{1}	Glacis United Intermediate	14
3	(Gibraltar) Francis Huart	Lynx Intermediate	10
4	(Scotland) David Moir	Manchester 62 Intermediate	7
5	(Gibraltar) Finlay Cawthorn	College 1975 Intermediate	6
5	(Gibraltar) Zayne Da Costa	Lincoln Red Imps Intermediate	6
5	(Gibraltar) Stefan Viagas	Manchester 62 Intermediate	6
8	(Gibraltar) Byron Espinosa	Europa Intermediate	5
8	(Gibraltar) Julian Lopez	Glacis United Intermediate	5
8	(Spain) Ismael El Mansouri	Hound Dogs	5
8	(Poland) Andrzej Bielanowicz	Lincoln Red Imps Intermediate	5
8	(Gibraltar) Dylan Peacock	Lincoln Red Imps Intermediate	5
8	(Gibraltar) Ayden Buckley	Manchester 62 Intermediate	5
8	(Gibraltar) Kaydrian Martinez	Bruno's Magpies Intermediate	5

- ^{1} Includes 1 goal for Bruno's Magpies Intermediate.

==== Clean Sheets ====
Rank	Player	Club	Clean sheets
1	(Gibraltar) Lee Mifsud	Lincoln Red Imps Intermediate	2
1	(Gibraltar) Peter Cabezutto	Europa Intermediate	2
3	(Gibraltar) Kean Galia	Bruno's Magpies Intermediate	3
3	(Gibraltar) Ivan Moreno	College 1975 Intermediate	3
3	(Gibraltar) Lewis Victor	Lions Gibraltar Intermediate	3
6	(Spain) Manu Caro	College 1975 Intermediate	2
6	(Gibraltar) Albert Chichon	Europa Point Intermediate	2
6	(Gibraltar) James Rovegno	Lions Gibraltar Intermediate	2
6	(Gibraltar) Giuseppe Plantone	Lynx Intermediate	2
6	(Gibraltar) Robert Rae	Lynx Intermediate	2
6	(Gibraltar) Noah Sene	Manchester 62 Intermediate	2

== See also ==
- 2021–22 Gibraltar National League
- 2021–22 Gibraltar Women's Football League
