= 2023–24 Gibraltar Football League =

Gibraltar Football League
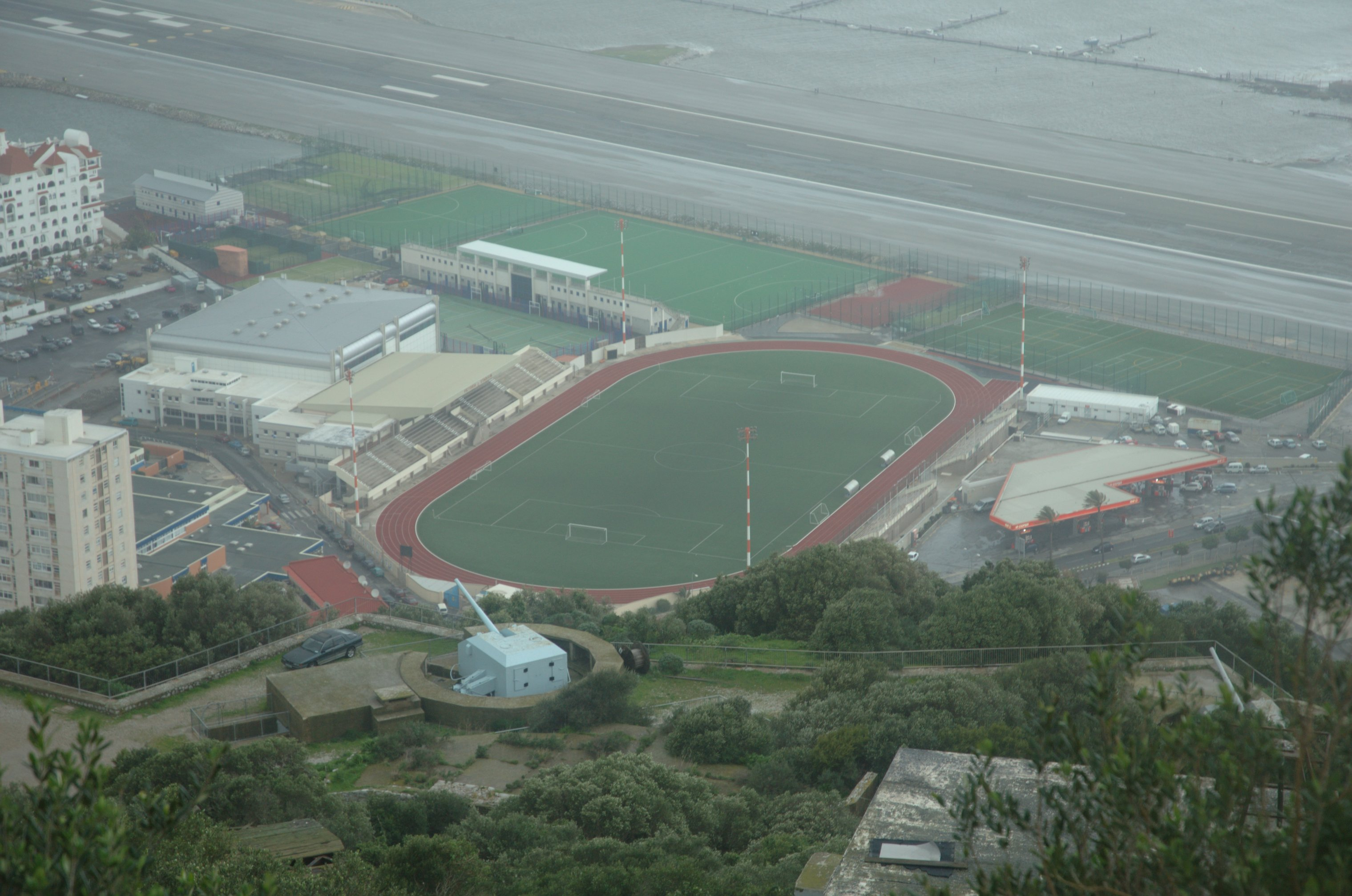
- The Victoria Stadium, where each match is played
- Season: 2023–24
- Dates: 16 September 2023 – 12 May 2024
- Champions: Lincoln Red Imps; 4th GFL title 28th overall
- Champions League: Lincoln Red Imps
- Conference League: FCB Magpies; St Joseph's
- Matches: 125
- Goals: 411 (3.29 per match)
- Top goalscorer: (Spain) Juanfri (17 goals)
- Best goalkeeper: (Gibraltar) Bradley Banda (13 clean sheets)
- Biggest home win: Manchester 62 7–0 Lions Gibraltar (5 November 2023); Lincoln Red Imps 7–0 College 1975 (17 December 2023)
- Biggest away win: Manchester 62 1–10 Lincoln Red Imps (21 April 2024)
- Highest scoring: Manchester 62 1–10 Lincoln Red Imps (21 April 2024)
- Longest winning run: 9 games Lincoln Red Imps
- Longest unbeaten run: 11 games St Joseph's
- Longest winless run: 16 games College 1975
- Longest losing run: 7 games Lions Gibraltar; Glacis United

The 2023–24 Gibraltar Football League season was the fifth season of the Gibraltar Football League in Gibraltar (and second under its current name), and the 125th season of football on the territory overall. The league began on 16 September 2023. Lincoln Red Imps were the reigning champions, winning their third successive title in April 2023. Due to the league's fall down the UEFA coefficient rankings, this season only had 2 teams qualify for the UEFA Conference League.

The winners (Lincoln Red Imps, their sixth consecutive title win and twenty-eighth overall) qualified for the 2024–25 UEFA Champions League first qualifying round. The runners-up (St Joseph's) and third-placed team (FCB Magpies) qualified for the 2024–25 UEFA Conference League first qualifying round.

== Format ==
The 2023–24 season saw a change in the format of the GFL. Instead of playing one round of fixtures before splitting, teams played each other twice for a total of 20 games this season. After the second round of games, the top 6 entered the GFL Championship Group, where each team played each other once to decide the league champion. However, the Challenge Group was scrapped.

== Controversy ==
In November 2023, it was reported that Lynx had been planning to report the Gibraltar Football Association to UEFA and FIFA after it was revealed that Lincoln Red Imps had fielded an ineligible player (believed to be Ibrahim Ayew) in their opening league match, which Lincoln had won 3-2. The GFA's ruling stated that though the player was suspended, Lincoln would not be punished for the mistake. This was despite the fact that Mons Calpe had been punished for a similar infraction the previous season. This led to complaints of bias and corruption within the GFA which formed the basis of the Lynx complaint.

Lynx subsequently finished 7th in the league, missing out on the Championship Group by a single point.

== Teams ==
Location of the stadium where all teams play

The following clubs compete in the 2023–24 season.

Note: Flags indicate national team as has been defined under FIFA eligibility rules. Players may hold more than one non-FIFA nationality.

Team	Manager	Captain	Kit manufacturer	Club sponsor	2022–23
FCB Magpies	(England) Nathan Rooney	(Mexico) Paco Zúñiga	Macron	Chestertons	3rd
College 1975	(Argentina) Leo Vela	(Gibraltar) Jamie-Luke McCarthy	Joma		10th
Europa	(Italy) Michele Di Piedi	(Spain) Antonio Bello	Kappa	Situs Construction	2nd
Europa Point	(Republic of Ireland) Ryan McCarthy (interim)	(Sweden) Martin Falkeborn	Custimoo	Bull Casino	11th
Glacis United	(Argentina) Claudio Racino	(Gibraltar) Julio Bado	Macron	LOBO	6th
Lincoln Red Imps	(Spain) Javi Muñoz	(Gibraltar) Roy Chipolina	Givova	Damex	1st
Lions Gibraltar	(Gibraltar) Adrian Parral	(Spain) Antonio Cintas	Macron		9th
Lynx	(Gibraltar) Albert Parody	(Gibraltar) Jesse Victory	Joma	Grupo Casais	4th
Manchester 62	(England) Jamie McDonough	(Gibraltar) Ethan Santos	Joma	Concussion Legacy Foundation	8th
Mons Calpe	(Spain) Juan Marí Sánchez	(Argentina) Christian Fraiz	Givova	FanPlay 365	7th
St Joseph's	(Spain) Abraham Paz	(Spain) Juanma González	Legea		5th

=== Managerial changes ===
Team	Outgoing manager	Manner of departure	Date of vacancy	Position in table	Incoming manager	Date of appointment
FCB Magpies	(England) Nathan Rooney	Resigned	17 May 2023	Pre-season	(Spain) Alfonso Cortijo	1 June 2023
Manchester 62	(England) Jamie McDonough	Appointed assistant coach	31 May 2023	Pre-season	(Australia) Anthony Limbrick	20 June 2023
Europa Point	(Gibraltar) Garry Lowe	Signed by Bruno's Magpies	6 July 2023	Pre-season	(Sweden) Dalibor Savic	12 July 2023
Glacis United	(Italy) Michele Di Piedi	Sacked	16 August 2023	Pre-season	(Argentina) Claudio Racino	1 September 2023
Europa	(Spain) Miguel Ángel Berlanga	Mutual consent	25 August 2023	Pre-season	(Spain) Mario Pérez	25 August 2023
FCB Magpies	(Spain) Alfonso Cortijo	Promoted to Director	1 September 2023	Pre-season	(England) Nathan Rooney	1 September 2023
Mons Calpe	(Spain) David Guti	Sacked	2 October 2023	8th	(Spain) Juan Marí Sánchez	3 October 2023
Manchester 62	(Australia) Anthony Limbrick	Resigned	23 November 2023	6th	(Gibraltar) Allen Bula (caretaker)	3 December 2023
Europa	(Spain) Mario Pérez	Sacked	6 December 2023	10th	(Spain) Ángel Espinosa (caretaker)	6 December 2023
Manchester 62	(Gibraltar) Allen Bula	End of caretaker spell	14 December 2023	4th	(England) Jamie McDonough	15 December 2023
Europa	(Spain) Ángel Espinosa	End of caretaker spell	1 January 2024	10th	(Italy) Michele Di Piedi	1 January 2024
College 1975	(Argentina) Luis Manuel Blanco	Resigned	17 February 2024	10th	(Argentina) Leo Vela	18 February 2024
Europa Point	(Sweden) Dalibor Savic	End of contract	30 April 2024	6th	(Republic of Ireland) Ryan McCarthy (interim)	1 May 2024

== Regular season ==
During the regular season, each team faced each other twice (once at home at once away), before the league is split into two (with only the top six teams advancing to the GFL Championship Group).

=== League table ===
Pos	Team	Pld	W	D	L	GF	GA	GD	Pts	Qualification (Note: Teams play each other twice (20 matches), before the top six teams advance to the GFL Championship Group.)
1	Lincoln Red Imps	20	17	1	2	63	12	+51	52	Qualification for the GFL Championship Group
2	St Joseph's	20	16	2	2	49	15	+34	50	Qualification for the GFL Championship Group
3	FCB Magpies	20	13	3	4	52	28	+24	42	Qualification for the GFL Championship Group
4	Mons Calpe	20	8	5	7	31	28	+3	29	Qualification for the GFL Championship Group
5	Manchester 62	20	9	1	10	39	41	−2	28	Qualification for the GFL Championship Group
6	Europa Point	20	8	4	8	27	22	+5	28	Qualification for the GFL Championship Group
7	Lynx	20	8	3	9	29	31	−2	27	
8	Europa	20	6	2	12	25	34	−9	20	
9	Glacis United	20	5	1	14	21	47	−26	16	
10	Lions Gibraltar	20	3	4	13	16	50	−34	13	
11	College 1975	20	3	2	15	21	65	−44	11	

Source: Soccerway
Rules for classification: 1) Points; 2) Head-to-head points; 3) Head-to-head goal difference; 4) Fair Play

=== Results ===
Home \ Away	FCB	COL	EFC	EPO	GLA	LIN	LGI	LYN	MAN	MON	SJO
FCB Magpies	—	7–2	3–1	2–2	3–0	0–0	3–1	2–1	2–0	3–1	2–4
College 1975	2–6	—	2–3	0–5	1–1	0–6	2–1	0–2	2–4	1–3	0–3
Europa	4–3	0–3	—	0–1	3–2	1–4	1–2	1–3	0–1	3–1	0–1
Europa Point	0–1	4–0	1–0	—	2–0	1–2	0–0	0–1	1–5	1–1	1–0
Glacis United	1–2	1–0	0–1	3–1	—	2–8	3–1	2–0	0–1	2–1	1–3
Lincoln Red Imps	3–0	7–0	2–1	1–0	3–1	—	2–0	3–2	5–0	2–1	1–2
Lions Gibraltar	0–2	1–1	0–5	1–3	1–0	0–2	—	0–4	2–1	0–0	1–5
Lynx	1–0	2–3	0–0	1–1	2–1	0–3	4–1	—	1–3	2–1	1–2
Manchester 62	1–5	4–1	1–1	0–2	5–0	0–7	7–0	5–1	—	1–2	0–3
Mons Calpe	2–4	1–0	1–0	3–1	5–1	0–2	2–2	1–1	2–0	—	1–1
St Joseph's	2–2	4–1	3–0	1–0	4–0	1–0	3–2	2–0	4–0	1–2	—

Source: Soccerway
Legend: Blue = home team win; Yellow = draw; Red = away team win.

== GFL Championship Group ==
The top six teams from the regular season contest the GFL Championship Group to decide the league champion. Results from the regular season were carried over into this round.

=== League table ===
Pos	Team	Pld	W	D	L	GF	GA	GD	Pts	Qualification
1	Lincoln Red Imps (C)	25	21	2	2	86	15	+71	65	Qualification for the Champions League first qualifying round
2	St Joseph's	25	20	3	2	62	16	+46	63	Qualification for the Conference League first qualifying round (Note: The 2023–24 Rock Cup winners also qualified for the Conference League first qualifying round. Since the cup winners (Lincoln Red Imps) qualified based on league position, the Conference League spot was passed to the third-placed team.)
3	FCB Magpies	25	14	4	7	55	36	+19	46	Qualification for the Conference League first qualifying round
4	Europa Point	25	10	5	10	32	31	+1	35	
5	Mons Calpe	25	9	6	10	37	39	−2	33	
6	Manchester 62	25	9	2	14	44	64	−20	29	

Source: Soccerway
Rules for classification: 1) Points; 2) Head-to-head points; 3) Head-to-head goal difference; 4) Fair Play
(C) Champions

=== Results ===
Home \ Away	FCB	EPO	LIN	MAN	MON	SJO
FCB Magpies	—	—	0–3	3–1	—	—
Europa Point	0–0	—	—	—	—	0–3
Lincoln Red Imps	—	4–0	—	—	5–1	—
Manchester 62	—	1–3	1–10	—	—	0–5
Mons Calpe	2–0	1–2	—	2–2	—	0–2
St Joseph's	2–0	—	1–1	—	—	—

Source: Soccerway
Legend: Blue = home team win; Yellow = draw; Red = away team win.

== Season statistics ==
=== Scoring ===
==== Top scorers ====
As of 12 May 2024.

Rank	Player	Club	Goals
1	(Spain) Juanfri	Lincoln Red Imps	17
2	(Sweden) Hugo Jesslén	Europa Point	16
3	(Spain) Pablo Rodríguez	St Joseph's	15
4	(Scotland) Connor Flynn-Gillespie	Lynx	14
5	(Spain) Labra	Europa	12
6	(Spain) Víctor Villacañas	Lincoln Red Imps	10
7	(Cuba) Aldair Ruiz	Manchester 62	9
8	(Argentina) Facu Álvarez	FCB Magpies	8
8	(Argentina) Seba Díaz	FCB Magpies	8
8	(Spain) José Giráldez	FCB Magpies	8
8	(Gibraltar) Tjay De Barr	Lincoln Red Imps	8
8	(England) Ahmed Salam	Manchester 62	8
8	(Poland) Hugo Bartkowiak (Note: Includes 4 goals for College 1975.)	Mons Calpe	8

==== Hat-tricks ====
Player	For	Against	Result	Date
(Netherlands) Manny Duku	Manchester 62	Lions Gibraltar	7–0 (H)	5 November 2023
(Sweden) Hugo Jesslén^{4}	Europa Point	College 1975	5–0 (A)	25 November 2023
(Argentina) Seba Díaz	FCB Magpies	Glacis United	3–0 (H)	8 December 2023
(Spain) Labra^{4}	Europa	Lions Gibraltar	5–0 (A)	16 December 2023
(Spain) Juanfri	Lincoln Red Imps	College 1975	7–0 (H)	17 December 2023
(Scotland) Connor Flynn-Gillespie	Lynx	Lions Gibraltar	4–0 (A)	28 January 2024
(Argentina) Facu Álvarez	FCB Magpies	College 1975	7–2 (H)	17 February 2024
(Spain) Juanfri^{4}	Lincoln Red Imps	Manchester 62	10–1 (A)	21 April 2024
(Spain) Manuel Caballero	St Joseph's	Manchester 62	5–0 (A)	3 May 2024

=== Clean sheets ===
Rank	Player	Club	Clean sheets
1	(Gibraltar) Bradley Banda	St Joseph's	13
2	(Spain) Nauzet Santana	Lincoln Red Imps	11
3	(Finland) Johannes Ström	Europa Point	9
4	(Gibraltar) Christian Lopez	FCB Magpies	5
4	(Gibraltar) Bradley Avellano	Lynx	5
6	(Argentina) Marcos Zappacosta	Europa	3
6	(Spain) Borja Valadés	Lions Gibraltar	3
6	(Spain) Daniel Tudela	Mons Calpe	3
9	(Spain) Walid Birrou	Glacis United	2
9	(Gibraltar) Dayle Coleing	Lincoln Red Imps	2
9	(Spain) Fernando Canto	Manchester 62	2
9	(Scotland) Alan Martin	Manchester 62	2
9	(Argentina) Christian Fraiz	Mons Calpe	2

== See also ==
- 2023–24 Gibraltar Intermediate League
- 2023–24 Gibraltar Women's Football League
