= 2023–24 Gibraltar Intermediate League =

Under-23 football league season

Gibraltar Intermediate League
- Season: 2023–24
- Dates: 18 September 2023 – 9 April 2024
- Matches: 42
- Goals: 197 (4.69 per match)
- All statistics correct as of 5 February 2024.

The 2023–24 Gibraltar Intermediate League is the sixth season of under-23 football in Gibraltar, after reforms to reserve team football in June 2018. The league will be contested by 11 teams - ten under-23 sides of the Gibraltar Football League clubs plus Hound Dogs.

Manchester 62 are the reigning champions. The league kicks off on 19 September 2023.

== Format ==
The Gibraltar Intermediate League was established by the Gibraltar Football Association in June 2018 as a merger of the pre-existing Reserves Division and Under 18 Division, in order to aid player development on the territory. Competing clubs are required to register a reserve squad of 18 players, of which 13 must be Gibraltarian.

== Teams ==
Location of the stadium where all teams play

Mons Calpe returned after a one-year absence, while Glacis United withdrew. Due to the lack of resources necessary to compete in the Gibraltar Football League, Hound Dogs were granted special permission by the Gibraltar FA to participate as a senior side in the Intermediate League.

Note: Flags indicate national team as has been defined under FIFA eligibility rules. Players may hold more than one non-FIFA nationality.

Team	Manager	Captain	Kit manufacturer	Club sponsor
FCB Magpies Intermediate	(Gibraltar) Terrence Jolley	(England) Jack Horrocks	Macron	Chestertons
College 1975 Intermediate	(Argentina) Leo Vela	(Gibraltar) Angel Field	Joma	
Europa Intermediate	(Gibraltar) Edgar Harrison	(Gibraltar) Sam Yeo	Kappa	Situs Construction
Europa Point Intermediate	(Republic of Ireland) Ryan McCarthy	(Gibraltar) Antony Moulds	Custimoo	Bull Casino
Hound Dogs	(Gibraltar) Chris Gomez	(Gibraltar) Jaygan Chipol	Joma	Sprint Sports
Lincoln Red Imps Intermediate	(Gibraltar) Ryan Casciaro	(Gibraltar) Kyle Clinton	Givova	Damex
Lions Gibraltar Intermediate	(Gibraltar) Adrian Parral	(Gibraltar) Kaylan Rumbo	Macron	
Lynx Intermediate	(Spain) José Navas	(Gibraltar) Jonathan Molina	Joma	Grupo Casais
Manchester 62 Intermediate	(England) Craig Cowell	(Gibraltar) Javan Peacock	Joma	MLEM
Mons Calpe Intermediate	(Spain) Manolo Muiño	(Wales) Tom Farmer	Givova	FanPlay 365
St Joseph's Intermediate	(Scotland) David Wilson	(Gibraltar) Bradley Beards	Legea	

== League table ==
Pos	Team	Pld	W	D	L	GF	GA	GD	Pts
1	Lincoln Red Imps Intermediate	8	8	0	0	32	9	+23	24
2	Lions Gibraltar Intermediate	8	6	1	1	19	10	+9	19
3	Manchester 62 Intermediate	8	5	1	2	20	15	+5	16
4	Europa Point Intermediate	8	5	0	3	34	12	+22	15
5	FCB Magpies Intermediate	6	4	0	2	15	11	+4	12
6	Mons Calpe Intermediate	7	3	1	3	13	16	−3	10
7	Lynx Intermediate	7	3	0	4	15	15	0	9
8	St Joseph's Intermediate	10	2	3	5	14	22	−8	9
9	Europa Intermediate	7	2	0	5	19	14	+5	6
10	College 1975 Intermediate	6	0	1	5	9	27	−18	1
11	Hound Dogs	9	0	1	8	7	46	−39	1

Updated to match(es) played on 5 February 2024. Source: Gibraltar FA
Rules for classification: 1) Points; 2) Goal difference; 3) Goals scored.

== Season statistics ==
=== Scoring ===
==== Top scorers ====
As of 5 February 2024.

Rank	Player	Club	Goals
1	(Gibraltar) Ashton Wahnon	Lincoln Red Imps Intermediate	12
2	(Gibraltar) Adam Gracia	St Joseph's Intermediate	9
3	(Saint Lucia) Kegan Caull	Europa Point Intermediate	8
3	(Sweden) Lukas Jonsson	Europa Point Intermediate	8
5	(England) Frankie Perry	Manchester 62 Intermediate	6
6	(England) Ike Nzuruba	Europa Point Intermediate	5
7	(Morocco) Saber Bchari	Europa Intermediate	4
7	(Gibraltar) Lee Chipolina	Lincoln Red Imps Intermediate	4
7	(Gibraltar) Kyle Clinton	Lincoln Red Imps Intermediate	4
7	(Gibraltar) Jonathan Sciortino	Lincoln Red Imps Intermediate	4

==== Hat-tricks ====
Player	For	Against	Result	Date
(England) Liam Preston	Lions Gibraltar Intermediate	St Joseph's Intermediate	3–3 (H)	25 September 2023
(Gibraltar) Ashton Wahnon	Lincoln Red Imps Intermediate	Manchester 62 Intermediate	4–2 (H)	26 September 2023
(Gibraltar) Ashton Wahnon	Lincoln Red Imps Intermediate	St Joseph's Intermediate	3–0 (H)	23 October 2023
(Saint Lucia) Kegan Caull^{5}	Europa Point Intermediate	Hound Dogs	11–1 (A)	26 October 2023
(Sweden) Lukas Jonsson	Europa Point Intermediate	Hound Dogs	11–1 (A)	26 October 2023
(Gibraltar) Kyle Clinton	Lincoln Red Imps Intermediate	Europa Intermediate	4–3 (A)	31 October 2023
(Sweden) Lukas Jonsson	Europa Point Intermediate	College 1975 Intermediate	6–1 (H)	2 November 2023
(Saint Lucia) Kegan Caull	Europa Point Intermediate	St Joseph's Intermediate	4–0 (A)	5 February 2024

=== Clean Sheets ===
Rank	Player	Club	Clean sheets
1	(Gibraltar) Lee Mifsud	Lincoln Red Imps Intermediate	3
2	(Gibraltar) Jordan Perez	Europa Intermediate	1
2	(Argentina) Marcos Zappacosta	Europa Intermediate	1
2	(Czech Republic) Ondrej Jacko-Lysak	Europa Point Intermediate	1
2	(Gibraltar) Jesse Gonzalez	Europa Point Intermediate	1
2	(Gibraltar) John Paul Hernandez	Lions Gibraltar Intermediate	1
2	(Spain) Juan Muñoz	Lions Gibraltar Intermediate	1
2	(Spain) Jorge Díaz	Lynx Intermediate	1
2	(Gibraltar) Thomas Recagno	Manchester 62 Intermediate	1
2	(Gibraltar) Michael Charvetto Parody	Mons Calpe Intermediate	1
2	(Argentina) Gonzalo Paz	St Joseph's Intermediate	1

== See also ==
- 2023–24 Gibraltar Football League
- 2023–24 Gibraltar Women's Football League
