= 2020–21 Gibraltar Intermediate League =

Third season of under-23 football in Gibraltar

Gibraltar Intermediate League
- Season: 2020–21
- Dates: 8 December 2020 – 17 May 2021 (abandoned)
- Matches: 30
- Goals: 166 (5.53 per match)
- Top goalscorer: (Gibraltar) Dylan Borge (Italy) Alessandro Borghi (8 goals)
- Best goalkeeper: (Gibraltar) Peter Cabezutto (3 clean sheets)
- Biggest home win: Glacis United Intermediate 7–0 Hound Dogs (15 May 2021)
- Biggest away win: College 1975 Intermediate 0–11 Europa Intermediate (4 April 2021); Mons Calpe Intermediate 1–12 Europa Intermediate (24 April 2021)
- Highest scoring: Mons Calpe Intermediate 1–12 Europa Intermediate (24 April 2021)
- Longest winning run: 5 matches Europa Intermediate; Lincoln Red Imps Intermediate
- Longest unbeaten run: 5 matches Europa Intermediate; Lincoln Red Imps Intermediate
- Longest winless run: 6 matches Mons Calpe Intermediate
- Longest losing run: 6 matches Mons Calpe Intermediate
- All statistics correct as of 17 May 2021.

The 2020–21 Gibraltar Intermediate League is the third season of under-23 football in Gibraltar, after reforms to reserve team football in June 2018. The league will be contested by 10 teams - nine under-23 sides plus Hound Dogs and began on 8 December 2020. Lincoln Red Imps are the reigning champions. The league was suspended from 17 December 2020 to 4 April 2021 due to the COVID-19 pandemic. As a result, when the league resumed play, the format of the league changed so that they would only play each other once.

== Format ==
The Gibraltar Intermediate League was established by the Gibraltar Football Association in June 2018 as a merger of the pre-existing Reserves Division and Under 18 Division, in order to aid player development on the territory. Competing clubs are required to register a reserve squad of 18 players, of which 13 must be Gibraltarian.

== Teams ==
Location of the stadium where all teams play

Following the early end to the previous season, Manchester 62 opted not to field an Intermediate team this season, with St Joseph's returning to the league. Boca Gibraltar were initially set to enter the league for the first time, but the revocation of their domestic license in November 2020 meant that the side did not enter. Due to the lack of resources necessary to compete in the new Gibraltar National League, Hound Dogs were granted special permission by the Gibraltar FA to participate as a senior side in the Intermediate League.

Note: Flags indicate national team as has been defined under FIFA eligibility rules. Players may hold more than one non-FIFA nationality.

Team	Manager	Captain	Kit manufacturer	Club sponsor
Bruno's Magpies Intermediate	(Gibraltar) Ben Parody		Joma	GVC Holdings; Chestertons
College 1975 Intermediate	(Gibraltar) Ezzard Mir	(Gibraltar) Zayne Da Costa	Joma	
Europa Intermediate	(Gibraltar) Jonathan Sodi	(Gibraltar) Christian Lopez	Kappa	La Parrilla; Betfred
Glacis United Intermediate	(Netherlands) Bennie Brinkman	(Gibraltar) Kivan Castle	Nike	
Hound Dogs	(Gibraltar) Chris Gomez	(Gibraltar) Ivan Borg	Joma	The Calpe Hounds
Lincoln Red Imps Intermediate	(Gibraltar) Malcolm Martin	(Gibraltar) Sean Montovio	adidas	Mansion
Lions Gibraltar Intermediate	(Spain) Alberto Ferri	(Gibraltar) Craig Bossano-Anes	Macron	
Lynx Intermediate	(Gibraltar) Jeky Buhagiar		Givova	Grupo Casais
Mons Calpe Intermediate	(Argentina) Claudio Racino		Joma	
St Joseph's Intermediate	(Gibraltar) Chisum Sanchez	(Gibraltar) Harry Victor	Hope + Glory	

== League table ==
Pos	Team	Pld	W	D	L	GF	GA	GD	Pts
1	Lincoln Red Imps Intermediate	6	6	0	0	29	8	+21	18
2	Europa Intermediate	6	5	0	1	35	3	+32	15
3	Lions Gibraltar Intermediate	6	5	0	1	19	7	+12	15
4	Bruno's Magpies Intermediate	6	4	0	2	19	15	+4	12
5	Lynx Intermediate	6	3	0	3	17	17	0	9
6	College 1975 Intermediate	6	3	0	3	17	18	−1	9
7	Glacis United Intermediate	6	2	0	4	13	15	−2	6
8	St Joseph's Intermediate	6	1	0	5	6	17	−11	3
9	Hound Dogs	6	1	0	5	5	28	−23	3
10	Mons Calpe Intermediate	6	0	0	6	5	37	−32	0

Updated to match(es) played on 17 May 2021. Source: Gibraltar FA
Rules for classification: 1) Points; 2) Goal difference; 3) Goals scored.

== Results ==
Home \ Away	BRU	COL	EFC	GLA	HOU	LIN	LGI	LYN	MCA	SJO
Bruno's Magpies				3–0			2–3			4–3
College 1975			0–11				2–3		7–0	
Europa							1–0			5–0
Glacis United		0–3			8–0			0–3		2–0
Hound Dogs			0–5			1–9			2–0	
Lincoln Red Imps	6–0	2–1	2–1	6–3						
Lions Gibraltar					4–1					
Lynx	1–7	2–4				2–4				
Mons Calpe	2–3		1–12							
St Joseph's					2–1		0–3	1–2		

Updated to match(es) played on 17 May 2021. Source: Gibraltar FA
Legend: Blue = home team win; Yellow = draw; Red = away team win.

Note: Glacis United Intermediate vs College 1975 Intermediate originally finished 5–1, before the result was overturned by the GFA. The same happened in the game against Lynx Intermediate, which originally finished 8–3 to Glacis. The match between Bruno's Magpies Intermediate and Glacis United Intermediate, scheduled for 6 May 2021, did not go ahead. Bruno's Magpies Intermediate were awarded a 3–0 win. The match between St Joseph's Intermediate and Lions Gibraltar Intermediate on 14 May was awarded to Lions.

== Season statistics ==
=== Scoring ===
As of 15 May 2021

==== Top scorers ====
Rank	Player	Club	Goals
1	(Italy) Alessandro Borghi	Glacis United Intermediate	8
1	(Gibraltar) Dylan Borge	Europa Intermediate	8
3	(Gibraltar) Kaylan Franco	College 1975 Intermediate	7
3	(Gibraltar) Luke Bautista	Europa Intermediate	7
5	(Gibraltar) Ashton Wahnon	Lincoln Red Imps Intermediate	6
6	(Gibraltar) Christian Mason	Bruno's Magpies Intermediate	5
6	(Gibraltar) Mitch Gibson	Europa Intermediate	5
6	(Gibraltar) Anthony Hernandez	Lincoln Red Imps Intermediate	5
6	(Spain) José Manuel Gómez	Lions Gibraltar Intermediate	5
6	(Gibraltar) Michael Ruiz	Lynx Intermediate	5

==== Hat-tricks ====
Player	For	Against	Result	Date
(Gibraltar) Michael Ruiz^{4}	Lynx Intermediate	Mons Calpe Intermediate	7–1 (H)	8 December 2020
(Gibraltar) Dylan Borge	Europa Intermediate	Hound Dogs	5–0 (A)	10 December 2020
(Gibraltar) Dylan Borge^{4}	Europa Intermediate	College 1975 Intermediate	11–0 (A)	4 April 2021
(Gibraltar) Kyle Rodriguez	Europa Intermediate	College 1975 Intermediate	11–0 (A)	4 April 2021
(Gibraltar) Kyle Casciaro	Lincoln Red Imps Intermediate	Glacis United Intermediate	6–3 (H)	12 April 2021
(Italy) Alessandro Borghi^{4}	Glacis United Intermediate	College 1975 Intermediate	5–1 (H)	15 April 2021
(Gibraltar) Luke Bautista^{6}	Europa Intermediate	Mons Calpe Intermediate	12–1 (A)	24 April 2021
(Gibraltar) Mitch Gibson^{4}	Europa Intermediate	Mons Calpe Intermediate	12–1 (A)	24 April 2021
(Gibraltar) Kadrian Verjaque	Lions Gibraltar Intermediate	Mons Calpe Intermediate	6–1 (H)	10 May 2021
(Gibraltar) Kaylan Franco	College 1975 Intermediate	Mons Calpe Intermediate	7–0 (H)	13 May 2021
(Gibraltar) Craig Galliano	Glacis United Intermediate	Hound Dogs	8–0 (H)	15 May 2021

==== Clean Sheets ====
Rank	Player	Club	Clean sheets
1	(Gibraltar) Peter Cabezutto	Europa Intermediate	3
2	(Gibraltar) Christian Lopez	Europa Intermediate	2
3	(Gibraltar) Mark Warwick	College 1975 Intermediate	1
3	(Gibraltar) Ivan Moreno	Glacis United Intermediate	1
3	(Argentina) Marcos Zappacosta	Glacis United Intermediate	1
3	(Spain) Juan Carcaño Blanco	Hound Dogs	1
3	(Gibraltar) Elijah Robles	Lincoln Red Imps Intermediate	1

== See also ==
- 2020–21 Gibraltar National League
- 2020–21 Gibraltar Women's Football League
