= 2023–24 Rock Cup =

Football tournament season

Tournament details
- Country: Gibraltar
- Dates: 30 January – 17 April 2024
- Teams: 12

Final positions
- Champions: Lincoln Red Imps
- Runners-up: Europa

Tournament statistics
- Matches played: 11
- Goals scored: 38 (3.45 per match)
- Top goal scorer: (Spain) Labra (4 goals)

The 2023–24 Rock Cup was a single-leg knockout tournament contested by clubs from Gibraltar. The cup was contested by the eleven teams from the 2023–24 Gibraltar Football League teams and one team from the 2023–24 Gibraltar Intermediate League. The winners qualified for the 2024–25 UEFA Conference League first qualifying round.

Lincoln Red Imps won the cup (their twentieth cup win) on 17 April 2024, defeating Europa 3–0 in the final.

== First round ==
Seven clubs from the 2023–24 Gibraltar Football League and one team from the 2023–24 Gibraltar Intermediate League entered the first round. The remaining Gibraltar Football League teams (Lincoln Red Imps, Lynx, Manchester 62, and Mons Calpe) received byes.

30 January 2024	Glacis United	9–0	Hound Dogs	Gibraltar
21:00	Robinson 5', 55', 60'; Trotman 47', 48'; Moore 65'; Brinkman 70', 85'; Pizarro 83'			Stadium: Victoria Stadium; Referee: José Antonio Díaz

31 January 2024	Europa	3–0	Europa Point	Gibraltar
21:00	Labra 67', 72'; Vigolo 65' (pen.)			Stadium: Victoria Stadium; Referee: Denis Perez

6 February 2024	College 1975	1–3	Lions Gibraltar	Gibraltar
21:00	Lima 45+1'		David 6'; Navas 19'; McGrail 90+1'	Stadium: Victoria Stadium; Referee: Timothy Reoch

7 February 2024	FCB Magpies	0–2	St Joseph's	Gibraltar
21:00			Rodríguez 27'; Cardozo 77'	Stadium: Victoria Stadium; Referee: Eduardo Vasquez

== Quarter-finals ==
The four first round winners and four teams given first round byes entered the quarter-finals.

20 February 2024	Lynx	0–4	Lincoln Red Imps	Gibraltar
21:00			Chipolina 4'; Britto 44'; Mandi 65'; Walker 90+1'	Stadium: Victoria Stadium; Referee: Jose Antonio Delgado

21 February 2024	Lions Gibraltar	0–2	Manchester 62	Gibraltar
21:00			Salam 31', 50'	Stadium: Victoria Stadium; Referee: Herbert Warwick

27 February 2024	St Joseph's	3–0	Mons Calpe	Gibraltar
21:00	Gaúcho 45'; Caballero 57', 80'			Stadium: Victoria Stadium

28 February 2024	Europa	3–1	Glacis United	Gibraltar
21:00	Gibson 30'; Labra 78', 81'		Huijzer 49'	Stadium: Victoria Stadium

== Semi-finals ==
The four quarter-final winners entered the semi-finals.

6 April 2024	Europa	3–0	Manchester 62	Gibraltar
19:30	Cataruozzolo 45'; Gracia 82'; Cipri 88'	Report		Stadium: Victoria Stadium; Referee: Jason Barcelo

7 April 2024	St Joseph's	0–1	Lincoln Red Imps	Gibraltar
19:30		Report	Nano 39'	Stadium: Victoria Stadium; Referee: Denis Perez

== Final ==
The final was held between the two semi-final winners.

17 April 2024
19:00 CEST

Lincoln Red Imps	3–0	Europa
Villacañas 45'; Casciaro 88'; De Barr 90+5'

Victoria Stadium, Gibraltar
Referee: Seth Galia

== Scorers ==
4 goals

- (Spain) Labra (Europa)

3 goals

- (Bermuda) Luke Robinson (Glacis United)

2 goals

- (Gibraltar) Julian Brinkman (Glacis United)
- (Barbados) Ryan Trotman (Glacis United)
- (England) Ahmed Salam (Manchester 62)
- (Spain) Manuel Caballero (St Joseph's)

1 goal

- (Spain) Gustavo Lima (College 1975)
- (Gibraltar) Mitchell Gibson (Europa)
- (Argentina) Federico Cataruozzolo (Europa)
- (Spain) Cipri (Europa)
- (Gibraltar) Adam Gracia (Europa)
- (Italy) Vittorio Vigolo (Europa)
- (Netherlands) Jasper Huijzer (Glacis United)
- (England) Leon Moore (Glacis United)
- (Gibraltar) Theo Pizarro (Glacis United)
- (Gibraltar) Ethan Britto (Lincoln Red Imps)
- (Gibraltar) Lee Casciaro (Lincoln Red Imps)
- (Gibraltar) Roy Chipolina (Lincoln Red Imps)
- (Gibraltar) Tjay De Barr (Lincoln Red Imps)
- (Spain) Mandi (Lincoln Red Imps)
- (Spain) Nano (Lincoln Red Imps)
- (Spain) Víctor Villacañas (Lincoln Red Imps)
- (Gibraltar) Liam Walker (Lincoln Red Imps)
- (Spain) Joel David (Lions Gibraltar)
- Kiri McGrail (Lions Gibraltar)
- (Spain) Eduardo Navas (Lions Gibraltar)
- (Uruguay) Gabri Cardozo (St Joseph's)
- (Brazil) Lucas Gaúcho (St Joseph's)
- (Spain) Pablo Rodríguez (St Joseph's)
