= Gibraltar Intermediate League =

Association football league in Gibraltar

- Founded: 2018
- Country: Gibraltar
- Confederation: UEFA
- Number of clubs: 11
- League cup: Gibraltar Intermediate Cup
- Current champions: Manchester 62 (2nd title) (2022-23)
- Most championships: Lincoln Red Imps; Manchester 62 (2 titles)
- Website: Gibraltar FA
- Current: 2023–24 Gibraltar Intermediate League

The Gibraltar Intermediate League is a semi-professional football league administered by the Gibraltar Football Association, launched in June 2018 as a replacement for the Gibraltar Reserves Division and the Under 18 Division in an effort to improve the standards of young Gibraltarian footballers.

== History ==
From 2008 until 2018, reserve team football in Gibraltar had been run under the Gibraltar Reserves Division. In this league, there were no restrictions on what players could participate, and some clubs would often field numerous members of the first team in fixtures. However, on 5 June 2018, the Gibraltar Football Association announced sweeping changes to the league structure, introducing the Intermediate League. In the new league, teams can register teams of up to 18 players, of which a minimum of 13 must be eligible for the Gibraltar national football team and a maximum of 5 players can be over the age of 23. Soon after the launch of the league, it was announced that clubs in the league will be subject to a salary cap, in order to prevent larger teams from hoarding players.

The first team to formally announce their intention to join the Intermediate League was Gibraltar Phoenix, signing 10 players for the new team on 10 June and appointing former Gibraltar under-19 and Mons Calpe manager Terrence Jolley. However, Phoenix would fold entirely the following season, while St Joseph's withdrew their side mid-season. These sides were replaced by new U23 sides from Bruno's Magpies and College 1975, while Hound Dogs were granted permission to play in the league as a senior side. In 2020, Boca Gibraltar also formed an U23 team, however they never competed in the league due to the club having its domestic license revoked. Manchester 62 also disbanded its Intermediate team in 2020, replaced by the returning St Joseph's.

== Teams for 2023-24 season ==
- Bruno's Magpies Intermediate
- College 1975 Intermediate
- Europa Intermediate
- Europa Point Intermediate
- Hound Dogs
- Lincoln Red Imps Intermediate
- Lions Gibraltar Intermediate
- Lynx Intermediate
- Manchester 62 Intermediate
- Mons Calpe Intermediate
- St Joseph's Intermediate

Note: Hound Dogs were granted special dispensation to compete as a senior team in the league.

== List of champions ==
Season	Champions	Runners up	Third place
2018–19	Lincoln Red Imps Intermediate (1)	Glacis United Intermediate	Gibraltar Phoenix Intermediate
2019–20	Lincoln Red Imps Intermediate (2)	Lynx Intermediate	Manchester 62 Intermediate
2020–21	Season abandoned		
2021–22	Manchester 62 Intermediate (1)	Glacis United Intermediate	Lynx Intermediate
2022–23	Manchester 62 Intermediate (2)	Glacis United Intermediate	College 1975 Intermediate
