= 2018–19 Gibraltar Intermediate League =

Gibraltar Intermediate League
- Season: 2018–19
- Dates: 21 August 2018 – 25 May 2019
- Champions: Lincoln Red Imps (1st title)
- Matches: 58
- Goals: 208 (3.59 per match)
- Top goalscorer: (Gibraltar) Adam Gracia (14 goals)
- Best goalkeeper: (Gibraltar) Jaylan Hankins (7 clean sheets)
- Biggest home win: Lincoln Red Imps 5–0 Mons Calpe (10 February 2019)
- Biggest away win: St Joseph's 0–9 Lincoln Red Imps (26 August 2018)
- Highest scoring: St Joseph's 0–9 Lincoln Red Imps (26 August 2018); Manchester 62 1–8 Europa (25 April 2019); Lions Gibraltar 4–5 Europa (23 May 2019)
- Longest winning run: 6 matches Lincoln Red Imps
- Longest unbeaten run: 15 matches Lincoln Red Imps
- Longest winless run: 9 matches Manchester 62
- Longest losing run: 9 matches Manchester 62
- All statistics correct as of 25 May 2019.

The 2018–19 Gibraltar Intermediate League is the first season of under-23 football in Gibraltar, after reforms to reserve team football in June 2018. The league is expected to be contested by ten clubs, and began on 21 August 2018 despite initially being set to begin on 13 August.

== Format ==
The Gibraltar Intermediate League was established by the Gibraltar Football Association in June 2018 as a merger of the pre-existing Reserves Division and Under 18 Division, in order to aid player development on the territory. Competing clubs are required to register a reserve squad of 18 players, of which 13 must be Gibraltarian.

== Teams ==
Location of the stadium where all teams play

The following teams were registered by the Gibraltar Football Association to compete. However, Gibraltar United withdrew from the league on the eve of their first game, citing a lack of players. St Joseph's resigned in December 2018 ahead of their Gibraltar Intermediate Cup tie against Gibraltar Phoenix.

Note: Flags indicate national team as has been defined under FIFA eligibility rules. Players may hold more than one non-FIFA nationality.

| Team | Manager | Captain | Kit manufacturer | Club sponsor |
|---|---|---|---|---|
| Europa | (Spain) Dani Izquierdo | (Gibraltar) Jemar Matto | Kappa | La Parrilla; Betfred |
| Gibraltar Phoenix | (Gibraltar) Terence Jolley | (Gibraltar) Peter Sardeña | Luanvi | Viajes LineaSol |
| Gibraltar United (withdrew) | (England) Graham Malcolm | | Kappa | Quantocoin |
| Glacis United | (Gibraltar) William Marsh | (Gibraltar) Daniel Pratts | Nike | |
| Lincoln Red Imps | (Gibraltar) Stephen Head | (Gibraltar) Tarik Chrayeh | Joma | Mansion.com |
| Lions Gibraltar | (Spain) Albert Ferri | (Gibraltar) James Parkinson | Givova | |
| Lynx | (Gibraltar) Jeky Buhagiar | (Gibraltar) Javan Parody | Silver Sport | Verralls |
| Manchester 62 | (Gibraltar) Michael Borge | (Gibraltar) Kieron Garcia | Joma | CEPSA GIB |
| Mons Calpe | (Argentina) Pedro González | (Spain) Juan Pablo Sosa | Givova | Tokamóvil |
| St Joseph's | (Gibraltar) Francis Picardo | (Gibraltar) Francis Picardo Jr | Joma | |

=== Managerial Changes ===
| Team | Outgoing manager | Manner of departure | Date of vacancy | Position in table | Incoming manager | Date of appointment |
|---|---|---|---|---|---|---|
| Mons Calpe | (Scotland) Lewis Fraser | Mutual consent | 27 October 2018 | 6th | (Argentina) Pedro González | November 2018 |

== League table ==
| Pos | Team | Pld | W | D | L | GF | GA | GD | Pts | Promotion or Qualification |
|---|---|---|---|---|---|---|---|---|---|---|
| 1 | Lincoln Red Imps Intermediate (C) | 14 | 11 | 3 | 0 | 39 | 4 | +35 | 36 | |
| 2 | Glacis United Intermediate | 14 | 7 | 6 | 1 | 27 | 11 | +16 | 27 | |
| 3 | Gibraltar Phoenix Intermediate | 14 | 8 | 3 | 3 | 31 | 17 | +14 | 27 | |
| 4 | Lynx Intermediate | 14 | 7 | 3 | 4 | 27 | 16 | +11 | 24 | |
| 5 | Europa Intermediate | 14 | 4 | 2 | 8 | 25 | 38 | −13 | 14 | |
| 6 | Lions Gibraltar Intermediate | 14 | 3 | 2 | 9 | 22 | 38 | −16 | 11 | |
| 7 | Mons Calpe Intermediate | 14 | 2 | 5 | 7 | 19 | 34 | −15 | 11 | |
| 8 | Manchester 62 Intermediate | 14 | 1 | 2 | 11 | 11 | 43 | −32 | 5 | |
| 9 | St Joseph's Intermediate (E) | 0 | 0 | 0 | 0 | 0 | 0 | 0 | 0 | Club resigned, record expunged |

Source: Gibraltar FA
Rules for classification: 1) Points; 2) Goal difference; 3) Goals scored.
(C) Champions; (E) Eliminated

== Season statistics ==
=== Scoring ===
As of 23 May 2019

==== Top scorers ====
| Rank | Player | Club | Goals |
|---|---|---|---|
| 1 | (Gibraltar) Adam Gracia | Lincoln Red Imps | 14 |
| 2 | (Gibraltar) Brendan Ramagge | Lions Gibraltar | 7 |
| 3 | (Gibraltar) Aaron Champion | Glacis United | 6 |
| 3 | (Gibraltar) Julian Del Rio | Lincoln Red Imps | 6 |
| 5 | (Gibraltar) Dylan Peacock | Lincoln Red Imps | 5 |
| 5 | (Gibraltar) Leone Seatory | Lynx | 5 |
| 5 | (Gibraltar) Daylian Victor | Gibraltar Phoenix | 5 |
| 8 | (Gibraltar) Luke Bautista | Mons Calpe | 4 |
| 8 | (Gibraltar) Sean Borg | Glacis United | 4 |
| 8 | (Germany) Razak Iddrisu | Europa | 4 |
| 8 | (Gibraltar) Jayce Marsh | Lions Gibraltar | 4 |
| 8 | (Gibraltar) Christian Mason | Gibraltar Phoenix | 4 |
| 8 | (Gibraltar) Lee Muscat | Europa | 4 |

==== Hat-tricks ====
| Player | For | Against | Result | Date |
|---|---|---|---|---|
| (Gibraltar) Zane Holgado | Mons Calpe | St Joseph's | 4–0 (H) | 29 November 2018 |
| (Germany) Razak Iddrisu | Europa | Lions Gibraltar | 3–2 (H) | 17 February 2019 |
| (Gibraltar) Adam Gracia | Lincoln Red Imps | Europa | 8-0 (A) | 7 April 2019 |
| (Gibraltar) Lee Muscat | Europa | Manchester 62 | 8-1 (A) | 25 April 2019 |
| (Gibraltar) Aaron Champion^{5} | Glacis United | Manchester 62 | 8-0 (A) | 23 May 2019 |

==== Clean Sheets ====
| Rank | Player | Club | Clean sheets |
|---|---|---|---|
| 1 | (Gibraltar) Jaylan Hankins | Lincoln Red Imps | 7 |
| 2 | (Gibraltar) Bradley Banda^{1} | Lynx | 6 |
| 3 | (Spain) Victor Ayala | Gibraltar Phoenix | 4 |
| 4 | (Gibraltar) Denzel Navarro | Glacis United | 2 |
| 4 | (Gibraltar) Liam Neale | Gibraltar Phoenix | 2 |
| 4 | (Gibraltar) Robert Rae | Lynx | 2 |
| 7 | (Gibraltar) Bradley Avellano | Lincoln Red Imps | 1 |
| 7 | (Gibraltar) Mickey Borge | Manchester 62 | 1 |
| 7 | (Gibraltar) Tarik Chrayeh | Lincoln Red Imps | 1 |
| 7 | (Spain) Christian Fraiz | Mons Calpe | 1 |
| 7 | (Argentina) Lucio Hernando | Lincoln Red Imps | 1 |
| 7 | (Gibraltar) Kaaron Macedo | Lions Gibraltar | 1 |
| 7 | (Gibraltar) Frank Warwick | Glacis United | 1 |

^{1}:Bradley Banda kept 3 clean sheets for Glacis United before transferring to Lynx.

== See also ==
- 2018–19 Gibraltar Premier Division
- 2018–19 Gibraltar Second Division
