= Julio Bado =

Spanish-Gibraltarian footballer (born 1983

Personal information
- Full name: Julio Gil Bado
- Date of birth: 3 June 1983 (age 43)
- Place of birth: Los Barrios, Spain
- Position: Midfielder

Senior career*
Years	Team	Apps	(Gls)
2002–2003	CD Guadiaro		
2003–2010	Unknown		
2010–2011	AD Los Cortijillos	10	(0)
2011–2014	Lynx		
2014	Manchester 62	1	(0)
2014–2017	Glacis United	53	(3)
2017–2018	Mons Calpe	12	(0)
2018–2019	Boca Gibraltar	9	(0)
2019	Gibraltar United	9	(0)
2019–2020	Boca Gibraltar	9	(0)
2020	Europa Point	9	(0)
2021–2023	Mons Calpe	35	(0)
2023–2024	Glacis United	17	(0)
2025	Lynx	3	(0)

International career
2013	Gibraltar	1	(0)
- * Club domestic league appearances and goals

Julio Gil Bado (born 3 June 1983) is a Spanish-Gibraltarian former professional footballer who played as a midfielder. He earned one cap for the Gibraltar national team in 2013.

== International career ==
Bado made his international debut with Gibraltar on 19 November 2013 in a 0–0 home draw with Slovakia. This was Gibraltar's first game since being admitted to UEFA

=== International career statistics ===
As of match played 19 November 2013.

Gibraltar national team
Year	Apps	Goals
2013	1	0
Total	1	0
