= Hugo Jesslén =

Swedish footballer

Personal information
- Full name: Jan Hugo Jesslén
- Date of birth: 19 February 2004 (age 22)
- Place of birth: Sweden
- Height: 1.76 m (5 ft 9 in)
- Position: Attacking midfielder

Team information
- Current team: St Joseph's
- Number: 18

Youth career
- –2023: IFK Lidingö Fotboll

Senior career*
Years	Team	Apps	(Gls)
2023–2024	Europa Point	24	(16)
2024–2025	Täby	13	(2)
2025–	St Joseph's	4	(2)
- * Club domestic league appearances and goals as of 7 March 2025

Jan Hugo Jesslén (born 19 February 2004) is a Swedish association footballer who currently plays for St Joseph's in the Gibraltar Football League.

== Career ==
In 2023, Jesslén signed for Europa Point F.C. in the Gibraltar Football League having played through his youth with IFK Lidingö Fotboll In his first season at the club, he would go on to win the Golden Boot for the club with 16 goals scored from 24 appearances, missing out on the league golden boot by one goal.

At the end of the season, he returned to Sweden to join Ettan Norra side Täby FK. He was unable to prevent their relegation with 2 goals in 13 games, and signed for St Joseph's on 31 January 2025. He scored twice in 4 league appearances in the tail end of the season as the Saints missed out on the title due to a worse head-to-head record against rivals Lincoln Red Imps. In July, he made his European debut with St Joseph's in the UEFA Conference League. In his second appearance, he scored an extra-time winner to secure progress against Northern Irish side Cliftonville.
