= Aldair Ruiz =

Cuban footballer

Personal information
- Full name: Aldair Issac Ruiz Ruiz
- Date of birth: 13 November 1997 (age 29)
- Place of birth: Cuba
- Height: 1.87 m (6 ft 2 in)
- Position: Forward

Team information
- Current team: Europa
- Number: 73

Youth career
- Santo Domingo
- –2016: San José

Senior career*
Years	Team	Apps	(Gls)
2016–2017	Morata		
2017–2018	Utrillas		
2018–2019	Utebo	35	(10)
2019–2020	Villanueva	27	(3)
2020–2021	Almudévar	17	(6)
2021–2022	Utebo	28	(5)
2022–2023	Lynx	20	(12)
2023	Europa	0	(0)
2023–2024	Manchester 62	17	(9)
2024–2025	Barbastro	10	(2)
2025–	Europa	30	(6)

International career^{‡}
2023	Cuba	4	(0)
- * Club domestic league appearances and goals as of 31 October 2026 ‡ National team caps and goals as of 2 July 2023

Aldair Issac Ruiz Ruiz (born 13 November 1997) is a professional Cuban footballer who plays as a forward for Gibraltar Football League side Europa and the Cuba national football team.

== Career ==
Aldair was called up for the Cuba national football team for the first time in June 2023, as part of their preliminary squad for the 2023 CONCACAF Gold Cup. He made his debut 10 days later, starting and playing 63 minutes in a 3–0 defeat to Chile.

== Career statistics ==
=== International ===
As of 2 July 2023

Cuba
Year	Apps	Goals
2023	4	0
Total	4	0
