= Johan Andersson (footballer, born May 1995) =

Swedish footballer

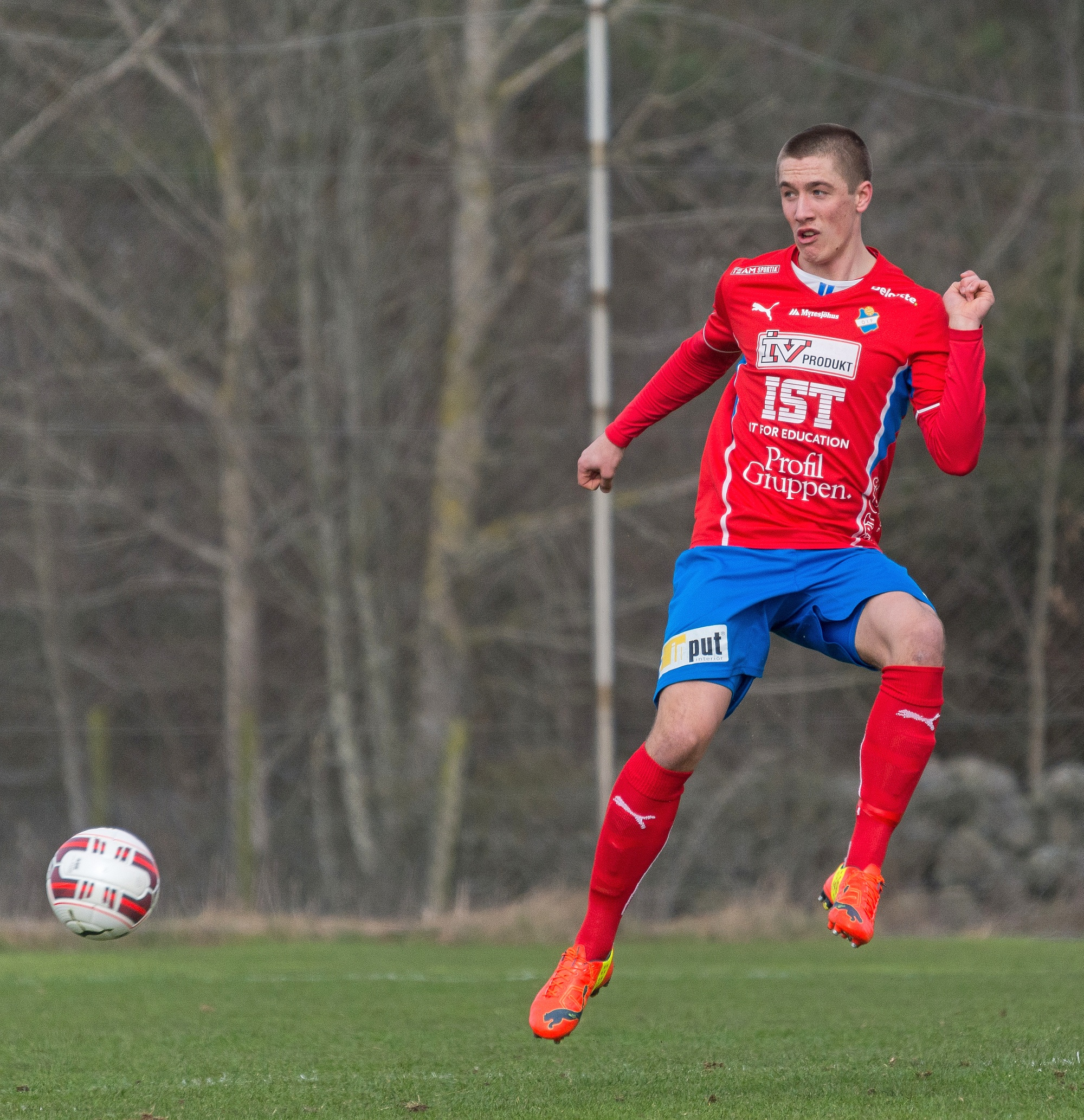

Personal information
- Date of birth: 7 May 1995 (age 31)
- Height: 1.87 m (6 ft 2 in)
- Position: Defender

Team information
- Current team: Europa Point
- Number: 3

Youth career
- Bredaryds IK

Senior career*
Years	Team	Apps	(Gls)
2012–2015	Öster	27	(0)
2015–2018	IFK Värnamo	59	(1)
2019–2020	Lund	58	(4)
2021–2023	Tvååker	65	(6)
2023–	Europa Point	23	(5)
- * Club domestic league appearances and goals as of 11 May 2024

Johan Andersson (born 7 May 1995) is a Swedish footballer who plays for Gibraltar Football League side Europa Point as a defender.

== Career ==
Andersson has played for Öster, IFK Värnamo and Lund.

In August 2023, he moved abroad for the first time, joining Europa Point in Gibraltar.
