= Jaron Vinet =

Gibraltarian footballer

Personal information
- Full name: Jaron Emmanuel Vinet
- Date of birth: 16 December 1997 (age 28)
- Place of birth: Gibraltar
- Height: 1.79 m (5 ft 10 in)
- Position: Midfielder

Team information
- Current team: Europa
- Number: 7

Youth career
- –2016: Lincoln Red Imps

Senior career*
Years	Team	Apps	(Gls)
2016–2018	Lincoln Red Imps	0	(0)
2017	→ Europa Point (loan)	12	(0)
2017–2018	→ Gibraltar Phoenix (loan)	4	(0)
2018–2020	Mons Calpe	19	(4)
2020–2021	Bruno's Magpies	17	(2)
2021–2023	Europa	12	(1)
2023–2024	Mons Calpe	23	(5)
2024–	Europa	55	(9)

International career^{‡}
2017–2018	Gibraltar U21	9	(0)
2025–	Gibraltar	2	(0)
- * Club domestic league appearances and goals as of 6 November 2026 ‡ National team caps and goals as of 17 November 2025

Jaron Emmanuel Vinet (born 16 December 1997) is a Gibraltarian association footballer who plays as a midfielder for Europa and the Gibraltar national football team.

== Club career ==
Vinet came through the youth ranks at Lincoln Red Imps. In January 2017 he was one of a number of young prospects that joined Gibraltar Premier Division strugglers Europa Point on loan for the remainder of the season, playing 12 times for them but was unable to prevent relegation. The next season, he went out on loan again, to Gibraltar Phoenix, before joining Mons Calpe permanently in 2018. He made his debut on 18 August 2018 against Boca Gibraltar. After a season and a half, he moved to Bruno's Magpies, making his debut in the aborted 2019–20 Championship Group campaign against St Joseph's on 18 January 2020.

== International career ==
Vinet made his international debut for Gibraltar on 8 October 2025, in a friendly against New Caledonia.

=== International ===
As of 17 November 2025

Gibraltar
Year	Apps	Goals
2025	2	0
Total	2	0
