= Sander Sybrandy =

Dutch footballer (born 2004)

Personal information
- Full name: Sander Julian Sybrandy
- Date of birth: 31 March 2004 (age 22)
- Place of birth: Zutphen, Netherlands
- Height: 1.76 m (5 ft 9 in)
- Position: Left winger

Team information
- Current team: Glacis United
- Number: 11

Youth career
- 2013–2020: Twente
- 2020–2023: Twente/Heracles Academie

Senior career*
Years	Team	Apps	(Gls)
2023–2025	Twente	1	(0)
2024	→ Ilves (loan)	1	(0)
2026	Feyenoord	0	(0)
2026–	Glacis United	10	(2)
- * Club domestic league appearances and goals as of 21 November 2026

Sander Julian Sybrandy (born 31 March 2004) is a Dutch professional footballer who plays as a left winger for Glacis United.

== Honours ==
Ilves

- Veikkausliiga runner-up: 2024
