= Antony Moulds =

Footballer (born 1988)

Personal information
- Full name: Antony James Moulds
- Date of birth: 4 February 1988 (age 38)
- Place of birth: Dunstable, England
- Height: 1.80 m (5 ft 11 in)
- Position: Full-back

Team information
- Current team: Europa Point
- Number: 3

Youth career
- Barton Rovers

College career
Years	Team	Apps	(Gls)
2006–2009	Loughborough University	–	(–)
2009–2010	Virginia Tech Hokies	–	(–)

Senior career*
Years	Team	Apps	(Gls)
2004–2006	Barton Rovers		
2010–2011	Leighton Town		
2011–2017	Raynes Park Vale		
2019	Boca Gibraltar	10	(1)
2019–2021	Europa Point	23	(2)
2021	St Joseph's	6	(0)
2022–	Europa Point	86	(3)

International career^{‡}
2006	England Schoolboys		
2021	Gibraltar	2	(0)
- * Club domestic league appearances and goals as of 20 November 2026 ‡ National team caps and goals as of 30 March 2021

Antony James Moulds (born 4 February 1988) is a semi-professional footballer who plays as a full-back for Europa Point in the Gibraltar Football League. Born in England and a former schoolboy international, he plays for the Gibraltar national team.

== International career ==
After naturalising for Gibraltar in 2019, Moulds made his international debut for Los Llanis on 27 March 2021 in a 2022 FIFA World Cup qualifying game against Montenegro.
