= Admonio =

Bissau-Guinean footballer

Personal information
- Full name: Admonio Vicente Gomes
- Date of birth: 10 November 1993 (age 33)
- Place of birth: Bissau, Guinea-Bissau
- Height: 1.78 m (5 ft 10 in)
- Position: Centre back

Team information
- Current team: Europa
- Number: 4

Youth career
- La Mojonera

Senior career*
Years	Team	Apps	(Gls)
2012–2013	La Mojonera	28	(4)
2013–2014	Berja	32	(1)
2014–2017	El Ejido	79	(7)
2017–2018	Linares	38	(0)
2018–2019	Unionistas	32	(1)
2019–2020	Numancia	8	(0)
2020–2022	UCAM Murcia	27	(0)
2022	→ Linares Deportivo (loan)	12	(0)
2022–2024	Algeciras	45	(0)
2024–	Europa	41	(4)
- * Club domestic league appearances and goals as of 10 October 2026

Admonio Vicente Gomes (born 10 November 1993), simply known as Admonio, is a Bissau-Guinean professional footballer who plays for Gibraltarian club Europa as a central defender.

== Club career ==
Admonio was born in Bissau, but moved to La Mojonera, Almería, Andalusia at early age. A La Mojonera CF youth graduate, he made his first team debut on 9 September 2012, starting in a 0–0 Regional Preferente home draw against CD Viator.

Admonio scored his first senior goal on 28 October 2012, netting the opener in a 3–1 away defeat of Ciudad Las Marinas. On 18 November, he scored a brace in a 3–3 draw at Comarca Nascimneto.

In July 2013, Admonio moved to fellow fifth division side Berja CF. Roughly one year later, after being a regular starter, he moved to CD El Ejido in Tercera División.

On 4 July 2016, after achieving promotion to Segunda División B, Admonio renewed his contract for a further year. On 19 July of the following year, he signed for Linares Deportivo in the fourth division.

On 3 July 2018, Admonio agreed to a contract with third division side Unionistas de Salamanca CF. He further extended his contract with the club on 22 August, being an undisputed starter.

On 9 January 2019, Admonio agreed to a deal with Segunda División side CD Numancia, effective as of 1 July. He only made his professional debut on 21 June of the following year, replacing Curro Sánchez late into a 0–2 away loss against CF Fuenlabrada.

On 28 September 2020, after suffering relegation, Admonio joined UCAM Murcia CF in the third division.
