= Gibraltar Intermediate Cup =

Knock-out soccer cup for under-23 sides in Gibraltar

- Founded: 2018
- Region: Gibraltar
- Teams: 11
- Current champions: Manchester 62 (1st title)
- Most championships: Manchester 62; Mons Calpe (1 title)
- 2022–23 Gibraltar Intermediate Cup

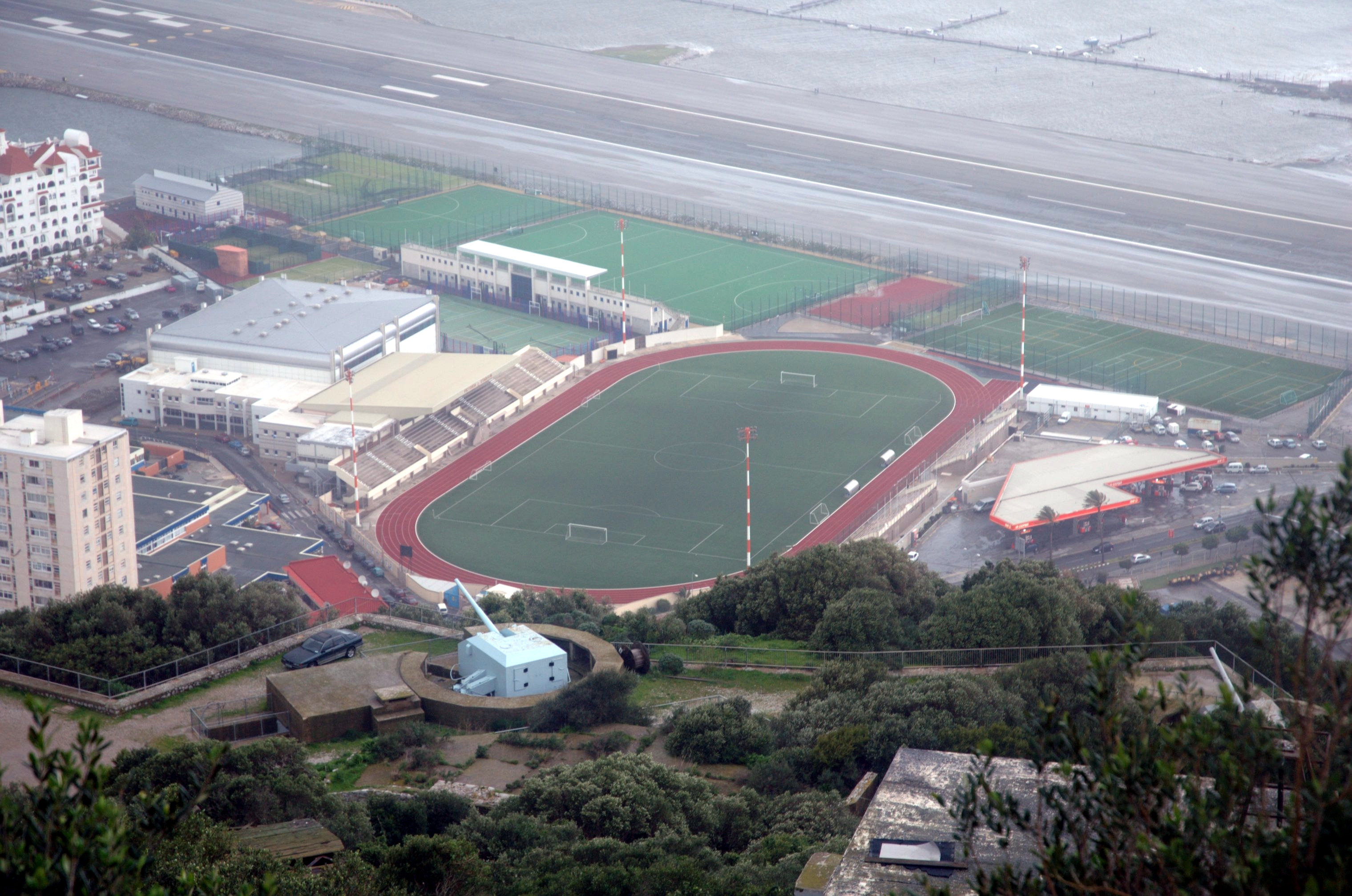
Victoria Stadium and the Bayside Sports Centre

The Gibraltar Intermediate Cup is a knock-out association football competition for under-23 sides in Gibraltar, organised by the Gibraltar Football Association. The cup was formed in 2018, with its first edition held that year. In its first edition, 9 teams competed, with a first round played by two teams in order to allow for an 8 team quarter final in the next round.

The competition was scrapped after one edition, but returned in the 2022–23 season under a revised format, including a group stage.
