= Adrian Parral =

Gibraltarian football manager (born 1970)

Personal information
- Date of birth: 23 September 1970 (age 56)
- Place of birth: Gibraltar

Managerial career
- Years: Team
- 2004–2014: Lion Gibraltar (youth)
- 2012–2015: Gibraltar (women)
- 2015–2018: Gibraltar (assistant)
- 2022–2024: Lion Gibraltar
- 2024–: Billericay Town (women)

Adrian Parral (born 23 September 1970) is a Gibraltarian football manager who manages Billericay Town.

== Career ==
In 2004, Parral was appointed as a youth manager of Gibraltarian side Lion Gibraltar. He managed the club from under-6 to under-eighteen level. In 2012, he was appointed manager of the Gibraltar women's national football team. He also worked as manager of the Gibraltar women's national under-21 football team. In 2015, he was appointed as an assistant manager of the Gibraltar national football team. He also worked as goalkeeper coach of the Gibraltar national football team.

In 2022, he returned to Gibraltarian side Lion Gibraltar as manager. He was regarded to have revived the club at the end of the 2021/22 season and make their style of play less defensive. In 2024, he was appointed manager of English side Billericay Town. He became the first Gibraltarian football manager to manage a senior team outside of Gibraltar. He was described as "aim[ing]... to build up the club to challenge for a Championship place over the next 3 years" while managing the club.

== Personal life ==
Parral was born on 23 September 1970 in Gibraltar. He has been regarded to use the 4-3-3 formation. He obtained a UEFA Ap1 License. He founded the European Soccer Coaching Academy in the United States.
