= F.C. Hound Dogs =

Association football club in Gibraltar

Hound Dogs
- Full name: Football Club Hound Dogs
- Founded: 2012; 14 years ago
- Ground: Victoria Stadium, Gibraltar
- Capacity: 2,300
- President: Jordan Duo
- Manager: Ryan McCarthy
- League: Gibraltar Football League
- 2025–26: 11th
- Website: Official Website
Home colours	Away colours

FC Hound Dogs is a football and futsal club from Gibraltar. They play their football in the Gibraltar Football League and the Rock Cup; their Futsal team compete in the Futsal 1st Division.

FC Hound Dogs offers young footballers in Gibraltar the platform and opportunity to play football and futsal. The club was founded with a strict rotation policy where the focus is on giving everyone game time.

== History ==
=== Formation ===
The club was founded in the summer of 2012 by Chris Gomez, Carl Bradford, David Bradford and Ercan Mehmet. The four of them set up the club from scratch, and later added Tyrone Smith to the backroom staff for the 2013–14 season. Chris and Tyrone had both been involved in coaching youth football for many years in Gibraltar, and as a result, had a group of young players interested in signing for them.

The vast majority of this group of players had been involved with Chris and Tyrone at Lions Gibraltar F.C., and later SJ Corinthians where they played alongside Ercan during the 2011–12 season and gained invaluable experience playing in the Gibraltar Premier Division. When SJ Corinthians folded at the end of the 2011–12 season, these young players had no club to play for, and as a result FC Hound Dogs was born.

After raising money via the players and founder members they were able to register and enter a football team into Gibraltar Second Division for the 2012–13 season; sponsorship was later secured via the Calpe Hounds Public House. The club started positively in their first season, finishing 4th.

=== After UEFA membership ===
The ascension of the Gibraltar Football Association to membership of UEFA led to a lot more money coming into football on the Rock, and as such, results began to decline for Hound Dogs with lower end of season finishes following in the coming seasons, although the club did provide a platform for young players such as Nick Castle, Etien Victory, Jamie Fortuna and Alan Wszeberowski to move to bigger clubs. Co-founder Ercan "Urge" Mehmet left the club in 2017, with a testimonial played in June that year.

However, results and finances continued to lag behind the rest of the pack, and in 2019 Hound Dogs withdrew from the newly formed Gibraltar National League, earning special dispensation to play in the Gibraltar Intermediate League along with U23 sides from other clubs in Gibraltar. After six years competing in the Intermediate League, Hound Dogs officially joined the Gibraltar Football League ahead of the 2025–26 season, after obtaining a Silver License. This was followed by the appointment of Ryan McCarthy as head coach, ending Chris Gomez's 13 years in charge of the club.

== Current football squad ==
As of 16 August 2026.

Note: Flags indicate national team as defined under FIFA eligibility rules; some limited exceptions apply. Players may hold more than one non-FIFA nationality.

No.	Pos.	Nation	Player
1	GK	POL	Jan Miazek
2	MF	GIB	Shane Borda
3	DF	EGY	Lucka Gasser
4	DF	ENG	Matt Clenahan
5	DF	ENG	Jayden Welch
6	MF	GIB	Titan Perez
7	MF	GIB	Cecil Prescott
8	MF	ENG	Harvey Welch (captain)
9	FW	GIB	Aiden Mansfield
10	FW	CAF	Rocky Lendet (vice-captain)
12	DF	GIB	Jesse Clinton
13	MF	BRA	Pedro Ivo
15	MF	ENG	Daniel Smith

No.	Pos.	Nation	Player
16	MF	JAM	Morais Lee
17	FW	USA	Vincent Luglio
18	FW	UGA	Alfred Oketayot
21	MF	GIB	Etien Victory
23	MF	ESP	Ismael Barkia
24	MF	POL	Oskar Skuza
26	DF	GIB	Leon Payas
27	DF	SWE	Neo Meijer
28	DF	GAB	Nélson Benga
31	GK	GAM	Famara Touray
45	GK	GIB	Keith Medhurst
77	GK	GIB	Jesse Gonzalez
—	MF	GIB	Aiden Holmes

=== Retired numbers ===
Note: Flags indicate national team as defined under FIFA eligibility rules; some limited exceptions apply. Players may hold more than one non-FIFA nationality.

No.	Pos.	Nation	Player
11	DF	GIB	Carl Bradford (posthumous honour)

== Current staff ==
=== Coaching staff ===
Position	Name
Head Coach	(Republic of Ireland) Ryan McCarthy
Assistant Coach	(Scotland) Ross Gray
Assistant Coach	(Spain) Pedro Mateo
Goalkeeper Coach	(Argentina) Raúl Cabrera
Goalkeeper Coach	(Gibraltar) Terry Victory
Physio	(Gibraltar) Kamyl Hammond
Physio	(Gibraltar) Sarah Montovio
Kitman	(Gibraltar) Kaylan Lopez
Head of Youth	(Gibraltar) Peter Hyde

=== Club committee ===
Position	Name
Club President	(Gibraltar) Jordan Duo
Vice President	(Gibraltar) Chris Gomez
Club Secretary	(Gibraltar) Steven Vassallo
Committee Member	(Gibraltar) Ivan Borg
Committee Member	(Gibraltar) Sean Calderon
