= Europa Point F.C. =

Association football club in Gibraltar

Europa Point
- Full name: Europa Point Football Club
- Nickname: A Progressive Club
- Founded: 2014; 12 years ago
- Ground: Victoria Stadium, Gibraltar
- Capacity: 2,000
- Chairman: Pär Magnus Roos
- Head coach: Claudio Racino
- League: Gibraltar Football League
- 2025–26: GFL, 8th of 12
- Website: http://www.europapointfc.com/
Home colours	Away colours

Europa Point F.C. is a professional football club from Gibraltar. The club currently plays in the Gibraltar Football League, the top tier of football in Gibraltar. They also participate in the Rock Cup, the territory's primary cup competition.

== History ==
The club formed in 2014 amidst the growing interest in association football on the territory of Gibraltar. The club held trials specifically aimed at bringing in youth team players that had been released by professional sides in England and Spain with the goal of getting them back into competitive football, with club founder John Gontier having formerly worked with such players while working for League Football Education. Before their maiden season, the club also announced a partnership with Chesterfield in League One, where the English side has first option on any Europa Point player.

After a strong start to the season, including a tight promotion challenge against Gibraltar United, the club narrowly missed out on promotion, finishing third in the league despite having the strongest goalscoring record in the Gibraltar Second Division. Despite missing out on promotion on the final day of the season, the club did end the season with silverware as they beat promoted side Angels 5–3 in a thrilling Gibraltar Division 2 Cup final that went to extra time.

After missing out on promotion in 2014–15, Europa Point were crowned champions of the 2015–16 Gibraltar Second Division after an unbeaten league campaign (W17 D5) and completed the double by retaining the Gibraltar Second Division Cup by beating Bruno's Magpies 3–2 A.E.T in the final. In preparation for the new season in the Premier Division they have signed many players including ex-Norwich City players George Jermy and Tom Walters. However, the players failed to impress and despite substantial changes in playing and coaching staff throughout the season, Europa Point finished bottom of the Premier Division and were relegated.

On 1 November 2017, it was announced that an American consortium headed by Peter Grieve and Corey Woolfolk had purchased a controlling stake in Europa Point. Woolfolk took over as chairman of the club, while John Gontier moved to CEO. On 10 November, Joaquin Rodriguez was announced as the new Head of Commercial and Football Operations. As part of the takeover, Europa Point became a partner club to Bantu Rovers in Zimbabwe. Gontier negotiated to re-take control of the club in early 2019, helping the club to a second-place finish in the league.

In the inaugural season newly formed Gibraltar National League, Europa Point started poorly under former Gibraltar national football team manager Allen Bula. However, the appointment of ex-Leyton Orient boss Ian Hendon in late November 2019 saw a significant upturn in results, only for the season to be voided by the onset of the COVID-19 pandemic.

In July 2020, Andrew Pritchard purchased a majority stake in the club, while John Gontier stayed on as minority shareholder. Following the end of the 2020–21 season, Gontier sold his remaining stake in the club to focus on Gibraltar Women's Football League side Gibraltar Wave. In November 2021, former Charlton Athletic player and Kemi City chairman Mark Tivey was announced as the club's new co-owner and technical director. However, this ownership was short lived and in July 2022, a Swedish consortium led by Pär Magnus Roos took over the club.

In July 2023, Swedish coach Dalibor Savić was appointed head coach, with player Ryan McCarthy becoming player-assistant manager. In his first season in charge, aided by a number of high-profile Scandinavian signings such as Johan Andersson, Johannes Ström and former Norway international Thomas Drage, Europa Point secured a top 6 finish in the Gibraltar Football League for the first time in their history.

=== Seasons ===
Season	Division	League record								Rock Cup
Season	Division	P	W	D	L	GF	GA	Pts	Pos	Rock Cup
2014–15	Second	26	20	3	3	124	20	63	3rd	Quarter-finals
2015–16	Second	22	17	5	0	76	79	56	1st ↑	First round
2016–17	Premier	27	2	2	23	13	120	8	10th ↓	Quarter-finals
2017–18	Second	14	7	3	4	31	18	24	4th	Second round
2018–19	Second	18	13	0	5	50	26	39	2nd	Second round
2019–20 (Note: Season abandoned due to COVID-19 pandemic. Results not officially recognised.)	National	18	7	4	7	35	38	25	8th	Quarter-finals
2020–21	National	18	1	0	17	10	73	3	11th	First round
2021–22	National	18	4	2	12	17	65	14	10th	Quarter-finals
2022–23	GFL	18	1	4	13	12	65	7	11th	First Round
2023–24	GFL	25	10	5	10	32	31	35	4th	First Round
2024–25	GFL	20	0	4	16	14	70	4	11th	First Round

== Current squad ==
=== First team ===
Correct as of 17 August 2026.

Note: Flags indicate national team as defined under FIFA eligibility rules; some limited exceptions apply. Players may hold more than one non-FIFA nationality.

No.	Pos.	Nation	Player
1	GK	SWE	Alex Jerner
2	GK	ESP	Pablo Bustamante
3	DF	GIB	Antony Moulds
4	DF	GIB	Will Sanders
5	DF	SCO	William Sandford (captain)
6	DF	SWE	Viktor Krüger
7	FW	POR	Nuno Miguel
8	MF	GIB	Leon Clinton
9	FW	SWE	André Nader
10	FW	JPN	Wataru Yamamoto
11	FW	SWE	Alexandar Mutić
12	DF	MAR	Yassine Ait Elhaj
13	GK	GIB	Mikey Charvetto
14	MF	SWE	Johannes Layton
15	FW	SWE	Dante Holmqvist
16	MF	GIB	Max Bautista
17	FW	JPN	Shinsho Yamahira

No.	Pos.	Nation	Player
18	DF	ENG	Luke Sowerby
19	MF	ESP	Javi Méndez
20	DF	GIB	Adam Achhoud
21	FW	ESP	José López
22	MF	JPN	Riku Yamamura
23	MF	GIB	Sykes Garro
24	MF	SWE	Oliver Silverholt
25	MF	GIB	Mark Chichon
27	MF	ESP	Denzel Sosa
28	FW	DMA	Theo Jeremy
29	DF	GIB	Adam El Haouzi
61	FW	POL	Hugo Bartkowiak
—	MF	DEN	Alex Johannesen
—	MF	LBA	Mohammad Kawan
—	MF	GIB	Dylan Duo, Jr.
—	MF	LAT	Taylor Kalinins

== Club staff ==
Position	Name
Club Management
Head Coach	(Argentina) Claudio Racino
Assistant Coach	(Spain) Roberto Carrasco
Goalkeeper Coach	(Spain) Cristopher Jackson
Physio	(Gibraltar) Gabriel Benatar
Board
Chairman	(Sweden) Pär Magnus Roos
Head of Youth	(Spain) Roberto Carrasco

== Honours ==
- Gibraltar National League – Challenge Group
  - Runners-up (1): 2019–20
- Gibraltar Second Division
  - Winners (1): 2015–16
  - Runners-up (1): 2018–19
- Gibraltar Second Division Cup
  - Winners (1): 2015, 2016
