= Europa F.C. =

Association football club in Gibraltar

Europa
- Full name: Europa Football Club
- Nickname: The Green Machine
- Founded: 1925; 101 years ago
- Ground: Victoria Stadium, Gibraltar
- Capacity: 2,000
- President: Eddie Yome
- Head coach: Michele Di Piedi
- League: Gibraltar Football League
- 2024–25: 3rd
- Website: http://www.europafc.gi
Home colours	Away colours

Europa FC is a professional football club from Gibraltar that competes in the Gibraltar National League. As other clubs in the territory, Europa FC currently shares the Victoria Stadium on Winston Churchill Avenue. The club also operates a women's team which competes in the Gibraltar Women's Football League.

== History ==
The club was founded in 1925. It was continuously active up to 1970. The club merged with College in the 1980s, going by College Cosmos until 2013, and in 2015 split again from College, changing from College Europa back to Europa FC, while College 1975 entered the Gibraltar Second Division. The name change was cleared by UEFA and the Gibraltar Football Association has granted back the honours the club lost when it folded initially.

The club saw considerable success in the late 1920s and early 1930s, where it won 4 of its 7 titles. However, against the likes of Prince of Wales, the club struggled to become a major force and won its 6th and final title in the 1951–52. After further declining fortunes, the club merged with College in 1970, although it failed to see a revival in fortunes as it would continue to move between the top two divisions of Gibraltar football for the next 40 years, last being out of the top flight in 2012–13.

Despite a 4th-place finish in the 2013–14 Gibraltar Premier Division, 2014 they were the first team from Gibraltar to play the UEFA Europa League after they finished runners-up in the Rock Cup. They lost the first match 0–3 against FC Vaduz from Liechtenstein. In the second leg they lost 1–0 at home, resulting in a 4–0 aggregate defeat. In 2015 the club had Gibraltar's first player to appear at a major international tournament, with Charly representing Equatorial Guinea at the 2015 Africa Cup of Nations.

In 2015 the club was renamed to their original name Europa FC. The side entered the UEFA Europa League once again, without a manager as Dimas Carrasco had not yet been appointed. The side lost 9–0 on aggregate to SK Slovan Bratislava with a new look side that received criticism from fans due to the lack of Gibraltarian players and large number of Spanish signings. Another season in 2nd place followed, although July 2016 did see Europa win their first continental cup tie, winning 3–2 on aggregate against FC Pyunik in the 2016-17 UEFA Europa League.

Further investment in the side under Juan Jose Gallardo saw an influx of young Gibraltarians join the Greens to align them with the league's new Home Grown Player Rule, including eventual international Sykes Garro and, most notably, key player Liam Walker from title rivals Lincoln Red Imps. The investment in the side drew dividends as the title race between Lincoln and Europa went down to the final round of games. Victory against Glacis United on 21 May, thanks to goals from Liam Walker and Kike Gómez, saw the club win their first title since 1952. A week later, the Greens won the 2017 Rock Cup, completing a domestic treble of Pepe Reyes Cup, Gibraltar Premier Division and Rock Cup for the first time in their history. However, after their extra-time defeat to The New Saints in the 2017–18 UEFA Champions League in July 2017, Gallardo stepped down from his managerial position to focus on his role as sporting director. Jonathan Parrado was brought in to take over management of the team.

== Notable managers ==
The following manager(s) made at least one major accomplishment while in charge of Europa:

Name	Period	Achievements
(Spain) José Requena	2014	Europa League qualification
(Bosnia and Herzegovina) Bruno Akrapović	2014–15	Gibraltar Premier Cup, Europa League qualification
(Spain) Dimas Carrasco	2015–16	Europa League qualification
(Spain) Juan José Gallardo	2016–2017; 2018	2016–17 Domestic Treble, Europa League 2Q round, 2018 Rock Cup

== Honours ==
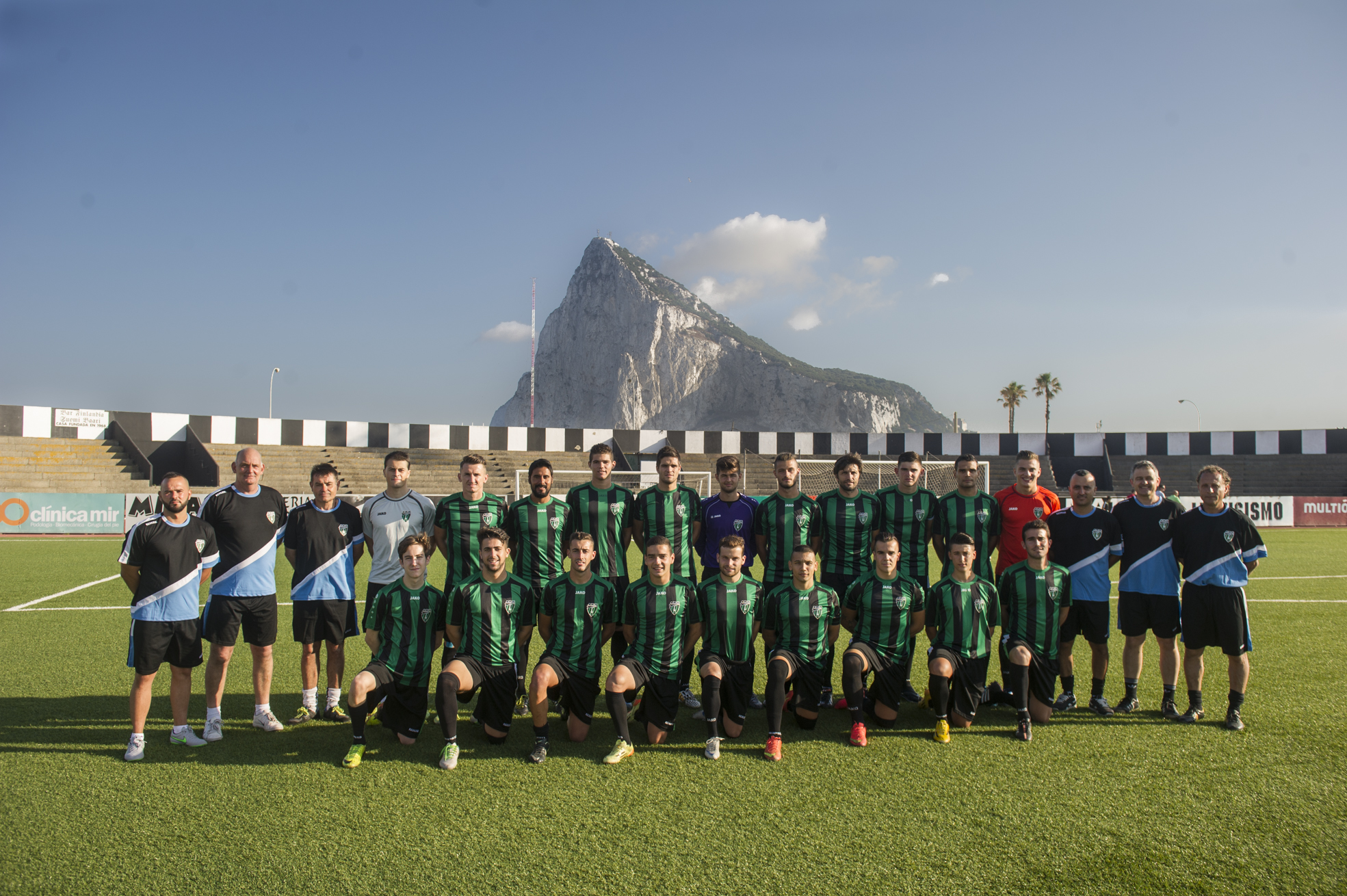
Europa FC squad on 25 June 2015

- Gibraltar Premier Division & Gibraltar Football League
  - Winners (7): 1928–29, 1929–30, 1931–32, 1932–33, 1937–38, 1951–52, 2016–17
- Gibraltar Second Division
  - Winners: 2012–13
- Rock Cup
  - Winners (11): 1939–40, 1945–46, 1949–50, 1950–51, 1951–52, 1955–56, 1957–58, 1960–61, 2017, 2017–18, 2019
- Gibraltar Premier Cup
  - Winners: 2014–15
- Pepe Reyes Cup
  - Winners (4): 2016, 2018, 2019, 2021
- Gibraltar Division 2 Cup
  - Winners: 2010

== European record ==
Season	Competition	Round	Club	Home	Away	Aggregate
2014–15	UEFA Europa League	1Q	(Liechtenstein) Vaduz	0–1	0–3	0–4
2015–16	UEFA Europa League	1Q	(Slovakia) Slovan Bratislava	0–6	0–3	0–9
2016–17	UEFA Europa League	1Q	(Armenia) Pyunik	2–0	1–2	3–2
2016–17	UEFA Europa League	2Q	(Sweden) AIK	0–1	0–1	0–2
2017–18	UEFA Champions League	1Q	(Wales) The New Saints	1–3	2–1	3–4
2018–19	UEFA Europa League	PR	(Kosovo) Prishtina	1–1	0–5	1–6
2019–20	UEFA Europa League	PR	(Andorra) Sant Julià	4−0	2−3	6–3
2019–20	UEFA Europa League	1Q	(Poland) Legia Warsaw	0–0	0−3	0–3
2020–21	UEFA Champions League	1Q	(Serbia) Red Star Belgrade	—N/a	0–5	—N/a
2020–21	UEFA Europa League	2Q	(Sweden) Djurgårdens IF	—N/a	1–2	—N/a
2021–22	UEFA Europa Conference League	1Q	(Lithuania) Kauno Žalgiris	0–0	0–2	0–2
2022–23	UEFA Europa Conference League	1Q	(Faroe Islands) Víkingur	1–2	0–1	1–3
2023–24	UEFA Europa Conference League	1Q	(Kosovo) Dukagjini	2–3	1–2	3–5
2026–27	UEFA Conference League	1Q	(North Macedonia) Shkëndija	0–5	0–1	0–6

Notes

- 1Q: First qualifying round
- 2Q: Second qualifying round
- PR: Preliminary round

== Current squad ==
=== First team ===
As of 3 August 2026

Note: Flags indicate national team as defined under FIFA eligibility rules; some limited exceptions apply. Players may hold more than one non-FIFA nationality.

No.	Pos.	Nation	Player
1	GK	GIB	Christian Lopez
2	DF	GIB	Julian Pecino
3	MF	AND	Marc Vales
4	DF	GBS	Admonio
5	DF	GHA	Oluwasegun Olalere
6	MF	ESP	Victor Corral
7	MF	GIB	Jaron Vinet
9	MF	ESP	Sergi García
10	MF	ESP	Alberto Quintana (captain)
11	FW	ITA	Vittorio Vigolo
12	FW	NED	Chardi Landu
14	DF	GIB	Luke Bautista
15	DF	USA	Lukas Rickenbach
16	DF	GIB	Aymen Mouelhi
18	MF	ESP	Bauti

No.	Pos.	Nation	Player
19	FW	VEN	Marco Farisato
20	MF	GIB	Shay Jones
21	DF	ESP	Pablo de Castro
22	DF	GIB	Sam Yeo
23	GK	ITA	Camillo De Luca
26	DF	GAM	Mustafa Drammeh
27	MF	GEQ	Cristian Boateng
29	FW	GIB	Patrick Cabezutto
30	FW	ESP	Pepe Carmona
37	FW	ESP	Álvaro Rey
44	MF	ESP	Borja Fernández
73	FW	CUB	Aldair Ruiz
90	FW	ESP	Rodri
99	FW	ITA	Francesco Di Piedi

==== On Loan ====
Note: Flags indicate national team as defined under FIFA eligibility rules; some limited exceptions apply. Players may hold more than one non-FIFA nationality.

No. / Pos. / Nation / Player	No. / Pos. / Nation / Player

== Club staff ==
Position	Name
Club Management
Manager	(Italy) Michele Di Piedi
Assistant coach	(Gibraltar) Leo Vela
Goalkeeper coach	(Spain) Raúl de la Vega
Physical trainer	(Italy) Mauro Daturi
Physio	(Spain) Julio Salvador
Team delegate	(Spain) Jordi Lardin
Board
Chairman	(Gibraltar) Patrick Cabezutto
Vice President	(Gibraltar) Peter Cabezutto
Director	(England) Guy Langton
