= Gibraltar Football League =

Association football league in Gibraltar

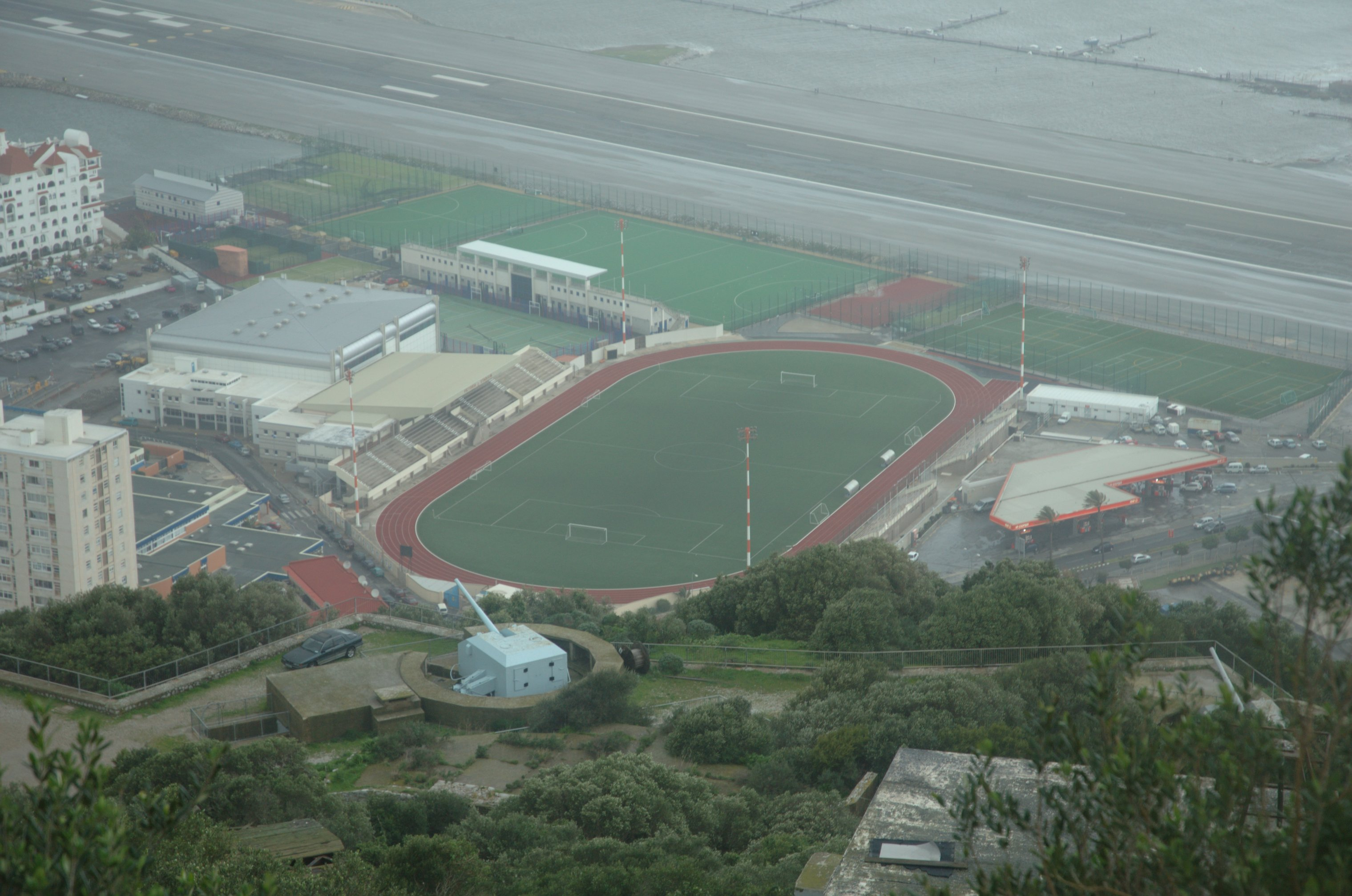
- Founded: 2019
- Country: Gibraltar
- Confederation: UEFA
- Number of clubs: 12
- Level on pyramid: 1
- Domestic cup: Rock Cup
- International cup(s): UEFA Champions League; UEFA Conference League
- Current champions: Lincoln Red Imps (6th title) (2025–26)
- Top scorer: Juanfri (107 goals)
- Broadcaster(s): Gibraltar FA TV
- Website: gibraltarfootballleague.com; www.gibraltarfa.com
- Current: 2026–27 Gibraltar Football League

The Gibraltar Football League is the only senior tier of association football in Gibraltar, founded in 2019 as the Gibraltar National League after a merger of the Gibraltar Premier Division, which served as the top division of football on the Rock since 1905, and the Gibraltar Second Division, which had existed since 1909. It was announced in August 2019 by the Gibraltar Football Association. The league is supported by the Gibraltar Intermediate League for U23 sides.

== Format ==
Rumours of the new league began in 2018, when the Gibraltar FA announced plans for a single tier format in its league constitution for the 2018–19 Gibraltar Premier Division. On 1 August 2019, the GFA confirmed details of the restructure of domestic football in Gibraltar, and the format of the new 16 team league. After 4 teams left the league, the remaining 12 teams are to follow the same league format. For the first 4 editions of the competition, teams played one round of games as a single league, before splitting into two groups: the Championship Group contested by the top 6 sides, and the Challenge Group between the bottom 6 sides. The winners of the Challenge Group will receive the GFA Challenge Trophy and receive a bye to the second round of the next season's Rock Cup. Hound Dogs, who participated in the final season of the Gibraltar Second Division, were granted special dispensation to compete in the Gibraltar Intermediate League.

The first season of the Gibraltar National League had no champion, as the season was declared null and void by the Gibraltar FA as a result of the COVID-19 pandemic.

In 2021, the Gibraltar FA announced that every game of the 2021–22 Gibraltar National League season would be streamed online through a broadcasting deal with Footters.

In July 2022, the league rebranded as the Gibraltar Football League, with a new identity and logo. The following year saw a change of format for the league. Instead of a single round-robin before the league split, the league instead returned to a double round robin format, with each team playing each other twice. At the end of the regular season, only the top 6 progressed to the next stage, entering the GFL Championship Group to decide the champion.

== Teams ==
Of the 17 teams that formed the initial league, three founder teams withdrew before the inaugural season started: Gibraltar Phoenix, Gibraltar United, and Leo. Additionally, Olympique 13 were expelled from the league after forfeiting the first two matches of the 2019-20 season. Hound Dogs, while a founding member, opted not to join the National League, instead competing in the Gibraltar Intermediate League for financial reasons until joining the league in 2025. In December 2020, Boca Gibraltar were also expelled from the league. FCB Magpies merged with youth side Calpe City in 2025, forming a new club, Calpe City Magpies, although as of May 2026 the status of this merger is unknown. Manchester 62 folded after being denied a license in May 2026. As such, the following 11 teams currently contest the competition.

Current clubs
Team	Formed	Joined	Previous season	Premier Division titles	GFL titles	GFA Challenge Trophies	Head coach
College 1975	1975	2019	9th	0	0	0	(Spain) Óscar León
Europa	1925	2019	3rd	7	0	0	(Italy) Michele Di Piedi
Europa Point	2014	2019	8th	0	0	0	(Argentina) Claudio Racino
Glacis United	1965	2019	10th	17	0	0	(England) Jonny Elwood
Hound Dogs	2012	2025 (Note: Though a founding member of the GFL, Hound Dogs played in the Gibraltar Intermediate League from 2019 to 2025.)	11th	0	0	0	(Republic of Ireland) Ryan McCarthy
Lincoln Red Imps	1976	2019	1st	24	6	0	(Spain) Juanma Pavón
Lions Gibraltar	1966	2019	5th	0	0	0	(England) Wally Downes
Lynx	2007	2019	6th	0	0	0	(Spain) Rafael Berges
FC Magpies	2013	2019	7th	0	0	1	(Netherlands) Youri Loen
Mons Calpe	2013	2019	4th	0	0	1	(Spain) Juan Marí Sánchez
St Joseph's	1912	2019	2nd	1	0	0	(Spain) Javi Muñoz

Former clubs
Team	Formed	Joined	Premier Division titles	GFL titles	GFA Challenge Trophies	Final season
Gibraltar Phoenix	2011	2019	0	0	0	N/A (Note: Club folded before start of first season.)
Gibraltar United	1943	2019	11	0	0	N/A
Leo	2004	2019	0	0	0	N/A
Olympique 13	2013	2019	0	0	0	2019–20 (Note: Club was expelled during the season.)
Boca Gibraltar	2012	2019	0	0	0	2020–21
Manchester 62	1962	2019	7	0	1	2025–26

== List of winners ==
Table includes top three of the Championship Group (top half of table) and Challenge Group (bottom half of table)

Season	Championship Group			Challenge Group			Golden Boot		Golden Glove	
Season	Champions	Runners Up	Third Place	First Place	Second Place	Third Place	Player	Goals	Player	Clean Sheets
2019–20	Abandoned due to COVID-19 pandemic (Note: The season was abandoned and declared null and void due to the COVID-19 pandemic, with title left vacant.)						(Spain) Juanfri	24	(Gibraltar) Dayle Coleing (Gibraltar) Jamie Robba	7
2020–21	Lincoln Red Imps	Europa	St Joseph's	Bruno's Magpies	Glacis United	Manchester 62	(Philippines) Kike Gómez	24	(Gibraltar) Christian Lopez	11
2021–22	Lincoln Red Imps	Europa	St Joseph's	Manchester 62	College 1975	Lynx	(Spain) Juanfri	14	(Scotland) Alan Martin	8
2022–23	Lincoln Red Imps	Europa	Bruno's Magpies	Mons Calpe	Manchester 62	Lions Gibraltar	(Spain) Juanfri	21	(Gibraltar) Dayle Coleing (Gibraltar) Jaylan Hankins	7
2023–24	Lincoln Red Imps	St Joseph's	FCB Magpies	Discontinued (Note: The GFA Challenge Trophy was discontinued after the 2022–23 season.)			(Spain) Juanfri	17	(Gibraltar) Bradley Banda	13
2024–25	Lincoln Red Imps	St Joseph's	Europa	Discontinued			(Italy) Vittorio Vigolo	15	(Gibraltar) Bradley Banda	10
2025–26	Lincoln Red Imps	St Joseph's	Europa	Discontinued			(Spain) Manu Toledano	30	(Gibraltar) Bradley Banda	14

== See also ==
- Gibraltar Premier Division
- Gibraltar Second Division
- Rock Cup
- Gibraltar Premier Cup
- Pepe Reyes Cup
