= Glacis United F.C. =

Association football club in Gibraltar

Glacis United
- Full name: Glacis United Football Club
- Nickname: The Clarets
- Founded: 1965; 61 years ago
- Ground: Victoria Stadium, Winston Churchill Avenue; Gibraltar
- Capacity: 2,000
- Owner: Glacis United FC Ltd.
- Chairman: Bennie Brinkman
- Manager: Jonny Elwood
- League: Gibraltar Football League
- 2025–26: 10th
- Website: www.glacisunited.com
Home colours	Away colours

Glacis United Football Club is a professional football club from Gibraltar, founded in 1965 and a member of the Gibraltar Football Association (GFA). The club share the Victoria Stadium with all other teams in the territory.

One of Gibraltar's most decorated teams, Glacis United currently compete in the Gibraltar Football League.

== History ==
Glacis United were formed in 1965 and immediately saw success as the dominant force in Gibraltarian football throughout the 1960s through to the 1980s, winning 9 consecutive titles from 1965 to 1966 to 1973–74 and further consecutive titles in the 1980s. However, the emergence of Lincoln Red Imps saw Glacis's dominance decline, and their 17th and final title to date came in the 1999–2000 season. Since then, the club have settled into mid-table in Gibraltar, with the club particularly struggling since the GFA joined UEFA in 2013. The recruitment of Manuel Jimenez Perez in 2016, however, saw a more successful season with the club finishing 4th in the 2016–17 season, challenging St Joseph's for 3rd place and UEFA Europa League qualification. Manager Manuel Jimenez Perez left at the end of the season, and was replaced by Mariano Marcos Garcia on 9 July 2017. Juan Andrés Espinosa was announced as his assistant.

== Honours ==
- Gibraltar Premier Division: 17

1965–66, 1966–67, 1967–68, 1968–69, 1969–70, 1970–71, 1971–72, 1972–73, 1973–74, 1975–76, 1980–81, 1981–82, 1982–83, 1984–85, 1988–89, 1996–97, 1999–2000

- Rock Cup: 5

1974–75, 1980–81, 1981–82, 1996–97, 1997–98

- Pepe Reyes Cup: 2

2000, 2005

- Gibraltar Division 2 Cup: 2

2005, 2007 (won by Glacis United Reserve team)

== Players ==
=== Current squad ===
As of 30 August 2026

Note: Flags indicate national team as defined under FIFA eligibility rules; some limited exceptions apply. Players may hold more than one non-FIFA nationality.

No.	Pos.	Nation	Player
1	GK	GIB	Harry Victor
2	DF	ARU	Gladwin Curiel
3	DF	GIB	Reed Wilson
4	DF	NED	Remi Akanni
5	DF	NED	Jelte Priem
6	DF	NED	Jaylan van Schooneveld
7	DF	AUS	Evan Allen
8	DF	GIB	Bilal Douah
9	FW	RSA	Simon van Duivenbooden
10	MF	ESP	José Cañas
11	FW	NED	Sander Sybrandy
12	FW	ENG	Justin Dass
13	DF	CUW	Jaïr Bryson
14	MF	GIB	Julian Brinkman

No.	Pos.	Nation	Player
15	MF	IRL	Pierce Lowth
16	MF	JAM	Jovauni Williams
17	FW	BRB	Ryan Trotman
18	FW	BER	Luke Robinson
19	MF	GIB	Kaleem Smith
20	MF	BAN	Mohamed Nehal
21	DF	GHA	Ibrahim Ayew (player-coach)
22	FW	FRA	Elijo Colin
23	FW	BER	Roger Williams, Jr.
24	FW	ENG	Shefe Odojukan
25	DF	GIB	Jayron Negron
26	MF	ESP	Cristian Díez
30	GK	ROU	Darius Cnacoschi

== Club staff ==
Position	Name
Club Management
Head coach	(England) Jonny Elwood
Assistant coach	(England) Michael Bakare
Player-coach	(Ghana) Ibrahim Ayew
Goalkeeper coach	(Italy) Simone Indeo
Physio	(Spain) Vanessa Sanchez
Board
Chairman	(Netherlands) Bennie Brinkman
Head of Youth Development	(Gibraltar) Kieran Alman
