= Manchester 62 F.C. =

Association football club in Gibraltar

Manchester 62
- Full name: Manchester 62 Football Club
- Nickname: The Red Devils of Gibraltar
- Founded: 1962; 64 years ago
- Dissolved: 2026
Home colours	Away colours	Third colours

Manchester 62 F.C. was a football club based in Gibraltar. The club last competed in the Gibraltar Football League.

== History ==
The club was founded as Manchester United F.C. in 1962, named in honour of the English club Manchester United by a group of supporters, after the manager Matt Busby gave them permission to use the name. They play in the Gibraltar Football League's First Division. United play their home games in the Victoria Stadium. In 2013, UEFA gave the Gibraltar Football League one place each in the qualifying rounds of both the Europa League and the Champions League, meaning that, for the first time, the two clubs could potentially meet in the same competition.

In June 2022, after years playing as a members-owned amateur club, Manchester 62 was sold to Pittsburgh City United founder Michael Anton Monsour. As part of the takeover, the club announced plans to follow the lead of Pittsburgh City United by mandating protective headgear for its players, subject to approval from the Gibraltar Football Association.

As part of the takeover, the club filmed a documentary and announced plans in March 2023 to submit a report to UEFA regarding the impact of protective headgear on head injuries.

On 19 February 2023, the club announced that 21-year-old YouTuber Theo Ogden would assume the role of technical director, making Ogden the youngest person to take up the role at a professional European club, however, Ogden has since left the role. This was followed by the appointment of Anthony Limbrick as manager in June 2023. However, the club suffered huge setbacks with investors pulling funding mid-season, leaving the club in a precarious position with multiple players leaving after the club failed to pay them. The club's future was secured in May 2024 with a $20 million cash injection from angel investor Takashi Cheng, through his private equity firm Monstranamus. However, financial troubles persisted and in 2026 they were denied a license to compete in the 2026–27 season, subsequently folding.

Manchester 62 FC fans were known for their unique tradition of singing "Gibraltar, Rock and Roll," a modified version of Chuck Berry's "Rock and Roll Music," during home games. The song has become the unofficial anthem of the club, and it is played before every match at Victoria Stadium.

== Club names ==
- 1962–2000 : Manchester United (Gibraltar) Football Club.
- 2000–2002 : Manchester United Eurobet Football Club.
- 2002–2008 : Manchester United (Gibraltar) Football Club.
- 2009–2013 : Manchester United Digibet Football Club.
- 2013–2026 : Manchester 62 Football Club.

== Sponsors ==
From 2013 to 2022, the club was sponsored by CEPSA Gibraltar. Upon the takeover by Monsour, the club partnered with Gibraltar Alzheimer's and Dementia Society (GADS). As of 2024, the club's kits are supplied by Joma. In 2023, the club partnered with Unequal Technologies to provide protective headgear for players. The club's shirt sponsors since 2023 are the Concussion Legacy Foundation.

== Players ==
=== Final squad ===
As of 1 April 2026.

Note: Flags indicate national team as defined under FIFA eligibility rules; some limited exceptions apply. Players may hold more than one non-FIFA nationality.

No.	Pos.	Nation	Player
1	GK	GIB	Jake Victor
3	MF	ANG	Kelson Jesus
5	DF	ENG	George Forrest
6	MF	ESP	Ginés
7	FW	MAR	Aimen Salmi
8	MF	GIB	Max Bautista
9	MF	ENG	Joshua Kazadi
10	MF	GIB	Omar Errouas
11	DF	ENG	Cemal Omer
13	GK	ESP	David Pérez
14	DF	GIB	Niall Garratt
17	DF	ENG	Mark Edzes

No.	Pos.	Nation	Player
19	DF	GIB	Daniel Sanchez
20	FW	SUI	Kevin Kagua
21	MF	ESP	José Galán (player-head coach)
23	MF	SYR	Ronyar Ossman
25	DF	GER	Giuliano Hill
30	DF	GIB	Evan Lopez
31	DF	GIB	Oliver Imossi
77	FW	GIB	Adam Aboudi
87	FW	AFG	Jafar Khan
93	MF	FRA	Simon-Antoine Aoudou
94	GK	GIB	Ethan Bonfante

== Club staff ==
Position	Name
Club Management
Player-Head Coach	(Spain) José Galán
Player-Assistant Coach	(Ghana) Ishmael Kofi Antwi
Assistant Coach	(Gibraltar) Craig Fortunato
Goalkeeper Coach	(Spain) José Requena
Strength & Conditioning Coach	(England) Oli Williams
Physio	(Spain) Javier Garcia
Board
Chairman	(United States) Michael Anton Monsour
General Manager	(Gibraltar) Melanie Mackenzie
General Secretary	(Gibraltar) Sean Cruz
Team Delegate	(Gibraltar) Randal Aldorino

== Honours ==
Gibraltar Premier Division: (7)

- Champions: 1974–75, 1976–77, 1978–79, 1979–80, 1983–84, 1994–95, 1998–99

Gibraltar Second Division: (1)

- Champions: 1973–74

Rock Cup: (3)

- Winners: 1976–77, 1979–80, 2002–03

Gibraltar Premier Cup: (7)

- Winners: 1975–76, 1976–77, 1980–81, 1984–85, 1985–86, 1994–95, 1998–99

Pepe Reyes Cup: (2)

- Winners: 2003, 2006

GFA Challenge Trophy

- Winners: 2021–22

== Honours Manchester United Reserves ==
Gibraltar Second Division: (3)

- Winners: 2002–03, 2004–05, 2005–06

Rock Cup: (1)

- Winners: 1973–74
