= Gibraltar Football Association =

Governing body of association football in Gibraltar

UEFA
- Founded: 1895
- Headquarters: World Trade Center, Gibraltar
- FIFA affiliation: 13 May 2016
- UEFA affiliation: 24 May 2013
- President: Michael Llamas, KC
- Website: gibraltarfa.com

The Gibraltar Football Association or also Gibraltar FA (GFA) is the governing body for Gibraltarian football and futsal. It was formed as the Gibraltar Civilian Football Association in 1895, changing to its current name in later years. It is one of the oldest football associations in the world. From October 2012, the GFA were provisional members of UEFA and the Gibraltar national futsal team, under-19 and under-17 representative teams participated in the 2013/14 UEFA season competitions. At the XXXVII UEFA Congress held in London on 24 May 2013, Gibraltar was accepted as a full member of UEFA. Gibraltar were admitted to FIFA as a full member on 13 May 2016 at the 66th FIFA Congress in Mexico.

== History ==
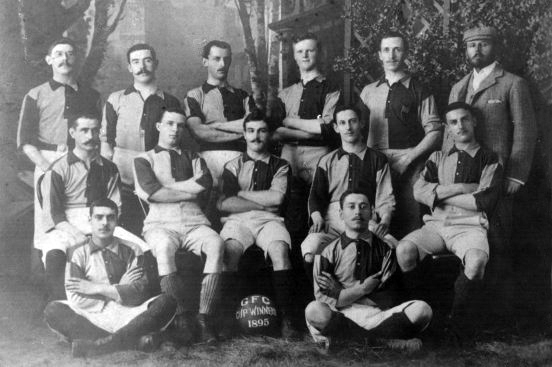
Winning team of the 1895 Merchants Cup of the Gibraltar Football Club.

The GFA was formed as an increasing number of football clubs were coming into existence in Gibraltar, and the association was designed to bring some form of organisation to the game there. Between the association's formation and 1907 the only football competition in Gibraltar was the Merchant's Cup. However, in 1907 the GFA established a league to complement the existing cup competition.

By 1901 the GFA had established a representative national team, competing against British military teams. This representative team continued to play down the years, their highlight probably being a draw against Real Madrid in 1949.

=== UEFA/FIFA application ===
The GFA affiliated with The Football Association in 1909, and became a full member of FIFA in 2016 allowing its national team to compete in all international competitions. This attempt was met with fierce opposition from the Royal Spanish Football Federation but was ratified on 13 May 2016 at the 66th FIFA Congress in Mexico.

The GFA's application to become a member of FIFA was filed in 1997. Two years later, FIFA confirmed the opening of the procedure and forwarded the GFA application to the appropriate continental confederation, UEFA, since according to FIFA statutes it is the responsibility of confederations to grant membership status to applicants. In 2000, a joint delegation of UEFA and FIFA conducted an inspection on the GFA's facilities and infrastructure. The Spanish FA strongly opposed the GFA's application. In 2001, UEFA changed its statutes so that only associations in a country "recognised by the United Nations as an independent State" could become members. On such grounds, UEFA denied the GFA's application.

Current FIFA and UEFA members include several federations which cannot be said to represent fully independent nations, such as the UK Home Nations (England, Northern Ireland, Scotland and Wales), the Faroe Islands, Guam, Hong Kong, Macau, New Caledonia, Puerto Rico and Tahiti (French Polynesia). Additionally, French Guiana, Guadeloupe, Martinique and Saint Martin each have national teams which, despite not being FIFA members, are allowed to compete at the CONCACAF confederation level. FIFA has also accepted members from other British overseas territories who compete in FIFA World Cup qualification tournaments despite not being sovereign states, including Anguilla, Bermuda, British Virgin Islands, Cayman Islands, Montserrat and Turks and Caicos Islands.

The GFA appealed to the world's highest sporting court, the Court of Arbitration for Sport (CAS), which in 2003 ruled that the GFA application should be handled according to the old statute. However, UEFA continued to refuse accepting the GFA as member. In August 2006, the CAS ruled again that Gibraltar had to be allowed as a full UEFA and FIFA member, and on 8 December 2006, it was announced that Gibraltar had become a provisional member of UEFA.

However, full membership required a vote of the UEFA membership. Leading up to this vote, the Spanish football federation lobbied against Gibraltar's membership. The Federation's president Ángel María Villar attributed Spain's opposition to the Spanish claim over Gibraltar. He also claimed it was a political issue and referred to the Treaty of Utrecht of 1713. On 26 January 2007 at the UEFA Congress held in Düsseldorf (Germany), Gibraltar's application to become a full member of UEFA was rejected, with 45 votes against, 3 in favour (namely, England, Scotland and Wales), and 4 undecided.

=== UEFA and FIFA membership approved ===
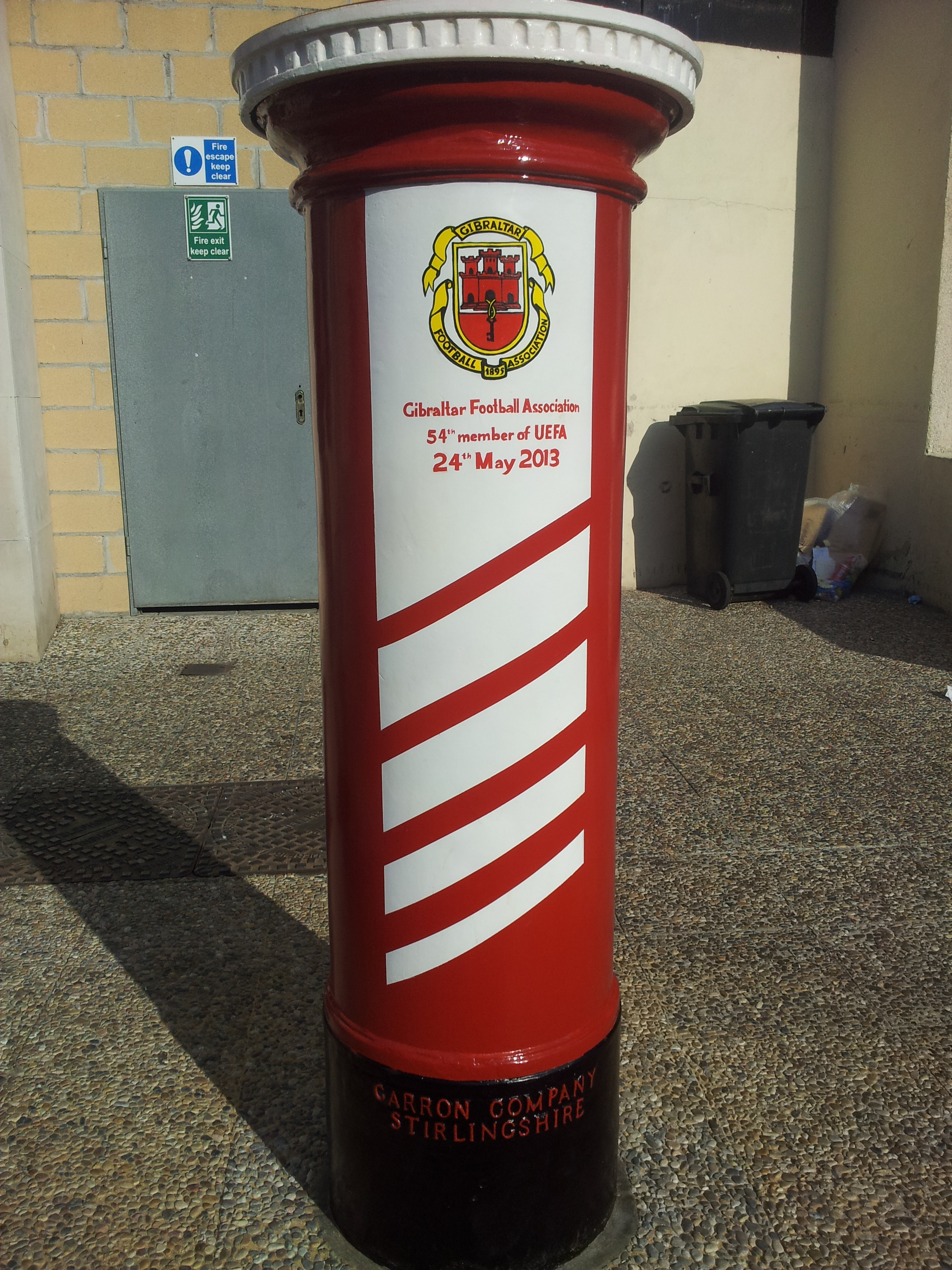
A Royal Gibraltar Post Office pillar box is painted as a tribute to the GFA's success in becoming a full member of UEFA on 24 May 2013

On 21 March 2012 the request for full UEFA membership by Gibraltar was discussed again, and a road map which includes financial and educational support from UEFA was agreed. This road map was to run until the Ordinary UEFA Congress in 2013, when member associations would vote on the request for admission. UEFA's Executive Committee admitted the GFA as a provisional member as of 1 October 2012, pending a vote at its Congress in May 2013 to make it a full member.

After the vote at the UEFA Congress held in London on 24 May 2013, Gibraltar was accepted as a full UEFA member. A vote was carried out, a clear majority was found to have voted to admit Gibraltar to UEFA. Two national associations; Belarus and Spain voted against the proposal.

Gibraltar became the smallest UEFA member by population, behind San Marino, then Liechtenstein and the Faroe Islands. Following the example of Armenia and Azerbaijan, Russia and Georgia, it was confirmed that Gibraltar and Spain would be kept apart in qualifying groups in all major tournaments such as the FIFA World Cup and the European Championship (the Euros).

As part of the celebrations for the GFA's achievement, a 54p stamp was issued by the Gibraltar Philatelic Bureau commemorating the association becoming the 54th member of UEFA.

On 13 May 2016, Gibraltar was accepted as a member of FIFA with a vote of 172 to 12 in favour. Gibraltar became FIFA's 211th member immediately after the Football Federation of Kosovo was voted member 210.

== See also ==
- Football in Gibraltar
- Gibraltar national football team
