= 2019 Rock Cup =

Tournament details
- Country: Gibraltar
- Dates: 20 January – 26 May 2019
- Teams: 17

Final positions
- Champions: Europa
- Runners-up: Gibraltar United

Tournament statistics
- Matches played: 16
- Goals scored: 100 (6.25 per match)
- Top goal scorer(s): Tjay De Barr (7 goals)

The 2019 Gibtelecom Rock Cup was a single-leg knockout tournament contested by clubs from Gibraltar. There were seventeen clubs participating in the cup this season. The final was played on 26 May 2019. The winner of the competition qualified to compete in the 2019–20 Europa League.

Europa were the defending champions after defeating Mons Calpe by a score of 2–1 in the previous season's final.

== First round ==
The draw for the first round was held on 29 November 2018. One first round match was played and all remaining clubs received a bye to the second round.

20 January 2019	Leo (2)	0–10	Bruno's Magpies (2)	Gibraltar
18:15		Report	Assumpção 13', 62', 86'; Parry 28', 67', 80'; Wyatt 50', 72'; Cuesta 56'; Dimitriu 71'	Stadium: Victoria Stadium

== Second round ==
The draw for the second round took place on 23 January 2019. The ties were played between 6 and 10 February 2019. A total of 16 clubs played in this round; the winner of the first round, the remaining five teams from the Second Division and all ten teams from the Premier Division.

6 February 2019	St Joseph's (1)	12–0	Hound Dogs (2)	Gibraltar
20:30	Green 4'; Andrew Hernandez 10', 33'; Reyes 18', 34', 87'; S. Gonzalez 52', 89' (pen.); R. Casciaro 54'; Lobato 62'; Anaya 78'; Harrison 83' (o.g.)	Report		Stadium: Victoria Stadium; Referee: Colin Griffiths

7 February 2019	Mons Calpe (1)	14–0	College 1975 (2)	Gibraltar
18:15	Carboni 3', 6', 82'; Pibe 10', 28', 51'; Panes 33' (o.g.); Trecco 34' (pen.), 74'; Pereyra 44'; Morgan 65'; Pegalajar 68', 77', 79'	Report		Stadium: Victoria Stadium

7 February 2019	Lincoln Red Imps (1)	1–2	Europa (1)	Gibraltar
20:30	Gómez 88'	Report	Arana 52'; Dimas 81'	Stadium: Victoria Stadium

8 February 2019	Manchester 62 (2)	0–12	Gibraltar United (1)	Gibraltar
20:30		Report	Ratto 23', 77', 90'; Dani Ponce 36', 86'; N. Santos 39', 45', 57'; Zapata 52', 88'; F. Álvarez 71'; De Torres 82' (pen.)	Stadium: Victoria Stadium

9 February 2019	Lynx (1)	1–3	Gibraltar Phoenix (1)	Gibraltar
16:00	Badr 45'	Report	Labra 27' (pen.); Serna 47'; Llaves 90'	Stadium: Victoria Stadium

9 February 2019	Glacis United (1)	1–1 (3–4 p)	Lions Gibraltar (1)	Gibraltar
18:15	Parker 36'	Report	Cantelmi 53'	Stadium: Victoria Stadium
	Penalties
	Gándara (penalty missed); Parker (penalty scored); N. Fernández (penalty scored); Ferrer (penalty scored); Novello (penalty missed)		(penalty scored) R. Bado; (penalty missed) Estiven; (penalty scored) Cintas; (penalty scored) Buhagiar; (penalty scored) Caravaca

9 February 2019	Europa Point (2)	0–2	Olympique 13 (2)	Gibraltar
20:30		Report	A. Carenote 63'; Egbo 73'	Stadium: Victoria Stadium

10 February 2019	Boca Gibraltar (1)	2–5	Bruno's Magpies (2)	Gibraltar
16:00	Castillo 12', 49'	Report	Cuesta 8', 79'; Fortuna 30'; Assumpção 72'; Grech 90'	Stadium: Victoria Stadium

== Quarter-finals ==
The draw for the quarter-finals took place on 15 February 2019. Two Second Division sides, Bruno's Magpies and Olympique 13, remained in the tournament. Ties were played on 12 and 13 March 2019.

12 March 2019	Gibraltar United (1)	4–2	Olympique 13 (2)	Gibraltar
18:15	Zapata 45'; Rubio 48'; Mouelhi 64'; N. Santos 85'	Report	Andrew Lopez 72'; A. Carenote 88'	Stadium: Victoria Stadium

12 March 2019	St Joseph's (1)	1–4	Mons Calpe (1)	Gibraltar
20:30	Cornejo 86'	Report	Zúñiga 47'; Britto 54'; Pibe 70'; Di Toro 90'	Stadium: Victoria Stadium

13 March 2019	Gibraltar Phoenix (1)	4–0	Lions Gibraltar (1)	Gibraltar
18:15	Labra 10' (pen.), 71'; Llaves 32'; K. Perez 90' (o.g.)	Report		Stadium: Victoria Stadium

13 March 2019	Bruno's Magpies (2)	1–9	Europa (1)	Gibraltar
20:30	Assumpção 75' (pen.)	Report	Quillo 17'; De Barr 27', 59', 72', 78', 86'; Jørgensen 31'; Ayew 47'; Walker 53'	Stadium: Victoria Stadium

== Semi-finals ==
9 April 2019	Gibraltar Phoenix	1–4	Europa	Gibraltar
19:30	Miñano 90+1'	Report	Jørgensen 3'; Dimas 24'; De Barr 49', 87'	Stadium: Victoria Stadium; Attendance: 54

10 April 2019	Gibraltar United	1–0	Mons Calpe	Gibraltar
19:30	F. Álvarez 35'	Report		Stadium: Victoria Stadium

== Final ==
26 May 2019
19:00

Gibraltar United	0–3	Europa
		Arana 54'; Arroyo 62'; Walker 65' (pen.)

Victoria Stadium, Gibraltar
Referee: Herbert Warwick

GK	1	(Gibraltar) Kyle Goldwin (c)
CB	5	(Gibraltar) Erin Barnett		Yellow card
CB	15	(Gibraltar) Aymen Mouelhi		Yellow card
CB	28	(Uruguay) Nicolás Márquez
RM	27	(Spain) Héctor Antona
LM	16	(Spain) Francisco Álvarez
CM	4	(Spain) David Gómez	(substituted off) 62'
CM	6	(Spain) Carlos Carrasco		Yellow card
CM	17	(Spain) Chico Rubio	(substituted off) 55'
ST	14	(Gibraltar) Nathan Santos	(substituted off) 74'
ST	26	(Spain) Alberto Zapata
Substitutes:
GK	13	(Gibraltar) Jorge Avellano
DF	22	(Spain) Moisés Suárez
MF	20	(Gibraltar) Michael Negrette	(substituted on) 62'
MF	21	(Argentina) Guido Ratto
MF	23	(Gibraltar) Julio Bado	(substituted on) 74'
FW	7	(Netherlands) Achraf Nait Brahim
FW	10	(Spain) Dani Ponce	(substituted on) 55'
Manager:
(Spain) Paco Luna

GK	23	(Gibraltar) Dayle Coleing
RB	5	(Ghana) Ibrahim Ayew
LB	2	(Gibraltar) Ethan Jolley
CB	4	(Spain) Olmo González
CB	6	(Denmark) Emil Peter Jørgensen
RM	10	(Gibraltar) Liam Walker (c)
LM	17	(Spain) Urko Arroyo	(substituted off) 73'
CM	8	(Spain) Álex Quillo
CM	20	(Ghana) Mustapha Yahaya	(substituted off) 70'
ST	9	(Spain) Manuel Arana		Yellow card
ST	19	(Spain) Manu Dimas	(substituted off) 86'
Substitutes:
GK	1	(Spain) Javi Muñoz
DF	3	(France) Nalys Castro
MF	12	(Germany) Razak Iddrisu	(substituted on) 86'
MF	15	(Spain) Domingo	(substituted on) 70'
MF	18	(Gibraltar) Aaron Payas
MF	22	(Gibraltar) Philip Gillingwater-Pedersen
FW	16	(Gibraltar) Mikey Yome	(substituted on) 73'
Manager:
(Spain) Rafa Escobar

Man of the match:

Match officials

- Assistant referees: Daniel Gomez & Michael Gordillo
- Forth official: José Antonio Delgado
- Reserve assistant referee: Kyron Azopardi
- Referee observer: Denis Alvarez

Match rules

- 90 minutes.
- 30 minutes of extra-time if necessary.
- Penalty shoot-out if scores still level.
- Seven named substitutes.
- Maximum of three substitutions.

== Scorers ==
As of 26 May 2019.

7 goals

- (Gibraltar) Tjay De Barr (Europa)

5 goals

- (Brazil) Matheus Assumpção (Bruno's Magpies)

4 goals

- Nathan Santos (Gibraltar United)
- (Argentina) Pibe (Mons Calpe)

3 goals

- (Spain) Fernando Cuesta (Bruno's Magpies)
- (England) Thomas Parry (Bruno's Magpies)
- (Spain) Labra (Gibraltar Phoenix)
- (Argentina) Guido Ratto (Gibraltar United)
- (Spain) Alberto Zapata (Gibraltar United)
- (Argentina) Leonardo Carboni (Mons Calpe)
- (Spain) Juanse Pegalajar (Mons Calpe)
- (Spain) José Luis Reyes (St Joseph's)

2 goals

- (Spain) Israel Castillo (Boca Gibraltar)
- (England) Finnlay Wyatt (Bruno's Magpies)
- (Spain) Manuel Arana (Europa)
- (Spain) Manu Dimas (Europa)
- (Denmark) Emil Peter Jørgensen (Europa)
- (Gibraltar) Liam Walker (Europa)
- (Spain) Juan Manuel Llaves (Gibraltar Phoenix)
- (Spain) Francisco Álvarez (Gibraltar United)
- (Spain) Dani Ponce (Gibraltar United)
- (Argentina) Néstor Trecco (Mons Calpe)
- (Spain) Alejandro Carenote (Olympique 13)
- (Gibraltar) Shawn Gonzalez (St Joseph's)
- (Gibraltar) Andrew Hernandez (St Joseph's)

1 goal

- (Canada) Alex Dimitriu (Bruno's Magpies)
- (Gibraltar) Jamie Fortuna (Bruno's Magpies)
- (Gibraltar) Matthew Grech (Bruno's Magpies)
- (Spain) Urko Arroyo (Europa)
- (Ghana) Ibrahim Ayew (Europa)
- (Spain) Álex Quillo (Europa)
- (Gibraltar) Alan Parker (Glacis United)
- (Spain) Cristofer Miñano (Gibraltar Phoenix)
- (France) Jordan Serna (Gibraltar Phoenix)
- Tito De Torres (Gibraltar United)
- Aymen Mouelhi (Gibraltar United)
- (Spain) Chico Rubio (Gibraltar United)
- (Spain) Kike Gómez (Lincoln Red Imps)
- (Argentina) Javier Cantelmi (Lions Gibraltar)
- (Egypt) Mohamed Badr (Lynx)
- (Gibraltar) Ethan Britto (Mons Calpe)
- (Argentina) Jonathan Di Toro (Mons Calpe)
- (Gibraltar) Kelvin Morgan (Mons Calpe)
- (Argentina) Jonathan Pereyra (Mons Calpe)
- (Mexico) Francisco Zúñiga (Mons Calpe)
- (Nigeria) Godwin Egbo (Olympique 13)
- (Gibraltar) Andrew Lopez (Olympique 13)
- (Spain) Javi Anaya (St Joseph's)
- (Gibraltar) Ryan Casciaro (St Joseph's)
- (Spain) Ernesto Cornejo (St Joseph's)
- (Gibraltar) Evan Green (St Joseph's)
- (Spain) Iván Lobato (St Joseph's)

Own goals

- (England) Ashley Harrison (Hound Dogs) - for St Joseph's
- (Spain) Sergio Panes (College 1975) - for Mons Calpe
- Kalian Perez (Lions Gibraltar) – for Gibraltar Phoenix

== See also ==
- 2018–19 Gibraltar Premier Division
- 2018–19 Gibraltar Second Division
