= 2020–21 Gibraltar National League =

Gibraltar National League
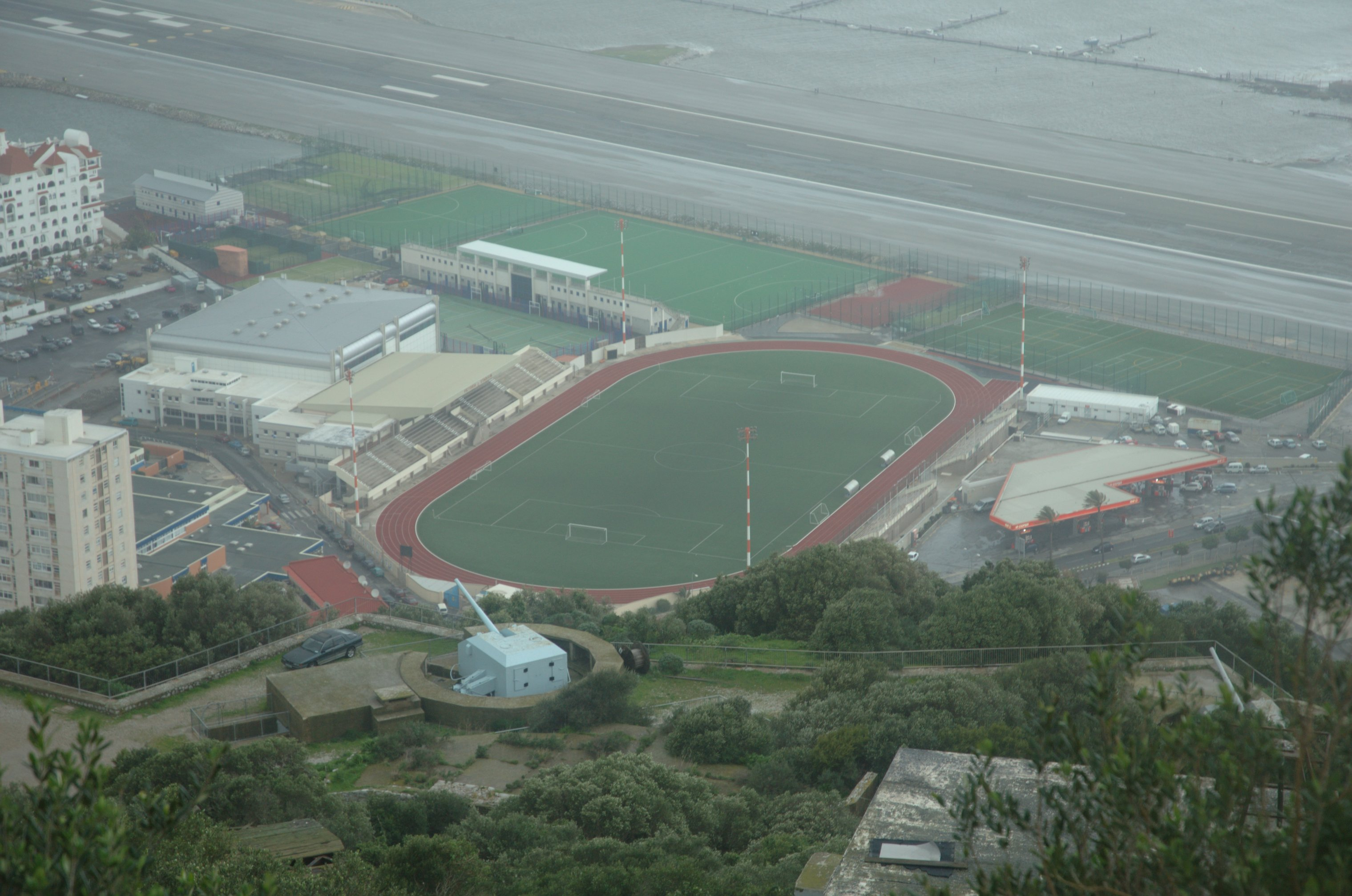
- The Victoria Stadium where each match will be played
- Season: 2020–21
- Dates: 16 October 2020 – 16 May 2021
- Champions: Lincoln Red Imps; 1st National League title 25th Gibraltar title
- Champions League: Lincoln Red Imps
- Europa Conference League: Europa; St Joseph's; Mons Calpe
- Matches: 104
- Goals: 418 (4.02 per match)
- Top goalscorer: Kike Gómez (24 goals)
- Best goalkeeper: Christian Lopez (11 clean sheets)
- Biggest home win: St Joseph's 13–1 College 1975 (12 December 2020)
- Biggest away win: Europa Point 0–9 Europa (25 October 2020); Manchester 0–9 Europa (13 December 2020)
- Highest scoring: St Joseph's 13–1 College 1975 (12 December 2020)
- Longest winning run: 7 matches Europa
- Longest unbeaten run: 10 matches Europa
- Longest winless run: 10 matches College 1975
- Longest losing run: 10 matches College 1975
- All statistics correct as of 20 March 2021.

The 2020–21 Gibraltar National League season is the second season of the new Gibraltar National League in Gibraltar, and the 122nd season of football on the territory overall. There are no reigning champions this season, as the previous season was declared abandoned as a result of the COVID-19 pandemic. The league is due to kick off on 16 October 2020. Instead of qualifying for the 2021–22 UEFA Europa League, teams placed 2nd, 3rd and the 2021 Rock Cup winners will qualify for the inaugural UEFA Europa Conference League.

== Format ==
The structure of the league will follow that of the previous season. Teams will play one round of games as a single league, before splitting into two groups: the Championship Group contested by the top 6 sides, and the Challenge Group between the bottom 6 sides. The winners of the Challenge Group will receive the GFA Challenge Trophy and receive a bye to the second round of the next season's Rock Cup. The league paused after the game on 20 December between Bruno's Magpies and St Joseph's, but resumed on 22 February 2021 with Lions Gibraltar defeating College 1975 3-2.

== Teams ==
Location of the stadium where all teams play

The following 12 teams began the 2020–21 Gibraltar National League. League positions from the previous season represent where teams stood when the season was abandoned.

Note: Flags indicate national team as has been defined under FIFA eligibility rules. Players may hold more than one non-FIFA nationality.

Team	Manager	Captain	Kit manufacturer	Club sponsor	2019–20
~~Boca Gibraltar~~	(Gibraltar) ~~Aaron Edwards~~	(England) ~~Lennie Armstrong~~	~~Forever 17~~	~~Plug-N-Go~~	~~10th~~
Bruno's Magpies	(Spain) Johnny Parrado	(Spain) Rubén Díaz	Joma	GVC Holdings; Chestertons	5th
College 1975	(Spain) Ángel Espinosa	(Gibraltar) Nazim Hughes	Joma		12th
Europa	(Spain) Rafa Escobar	(Gibraltar) Liam Walker	Kappa	La Parrilla; Betfred	1st
Europa Point	(England) Craig Cowell	(Gibraltar) Kailan Perez	Hope + Glory	Marbella Ketones (front); Eco Wave Power (back); AKHS Management (sleeve)	8th
Glacis United	(Spain) Javier Sánchez Alfaro	(Argentina) Miguel Londero	Nike		11th
Lincoln Red Imps	(Gibraltar) Mick McElwee	(Gibraltar) Roy Chipolina	adidas	Mansion.com	3rd
Lions Gibraltar	(Spain) Alberto Ferri	(Gibraltar) Jay Bosio	Macron		6th
Lynx	(Gibraltar) Albert Parody	(Gibraltar) Chuky González	Givova	Grupo Casais	4th
Manchester 62	(Scotland) David Wilson	(Gibraltar) Robert Montovio	Joma	CEPSA GIB	9th
Mons Calpe	(Uruguay) César Vega	(Argentina) Christian Fraiz	Givova	FanPlay 365	7th
St Joseph's	(Spain) Raúl Procopio Baizán	(Spain) Boro	Hope + Glory		2nd

=== Managerial Changes ===
Team	Outgoing manager	Manner of departure	Date of vacancy	Position in table	Incoming manager	Date of appointment
Lincoln Red Imps	(Spain) Germán Crespo	Mutual consent	20 May 2020	Pre-season	(Brazil) William	28 May 2020
Bruno's Magpies	(Spain) Juan Maria Sánchez	Mutual consent	31 May 2020	Pre-season	(Spain) Johnny Parrado	23 July 2020
Boca Gibraltar	(England) Craig Cowell	Moved to U23 Manager	1 June 2020	Pre-season	(England) Stephen Vaughan Jr.	1 June 2020
Boca Gibraltar	(England) Stephen Vaughan Jr.	Denied license by GFA	9 August 2020	Pre-season	(Gibraltar) Aaron Edwards	9 August 2020
Glacis United	(Italy) Michele Di Piedi	Promoted to Director of Football	1 September 2020	Pre-season	(Nigeria) Paul Aigbogun	1 September 2020
Mons Calpe	(Argentina) Luis Manuel Blanco	Mutual consent	16 September 2020	Pre-season	(Uruguay) César Vega	16 September 2020
Europa Point	(England) Ian Hendon	Mutual consent	1 October 2020	Pre-season	(Spain) Dani Amaya	1 October 2020
Lincoln Red Imps	(Brazil) William	Mutual consent	5 October 2020	Pre-season	(Gibraltar) Mick McElwee	5 October 2020
Glacis United	(Nigeria) Paul Aigbogun	Signed by Nigeria Football Federation	23 October 2020	7th	(Spain) Javier Sánchez Alfaro	25 October 2020
Europa Point	(Spain) Dani Amaya	Mutual consent	2 November 2020	11th	(England) Steve Cummings	2 November 2020
Europa Point	(England) Steve Cummings	Sacked	19 March 2021	12th	(England) Craig Cowell	19 March 2021

== League table ==
Pos	Team	Pld	W	D	L	GF	GA	GD	Pts	Qualification or relegation (Note: Teams play each other once (10 matches), before the league splits into two groups (the top six and the bottom five) for the last 10 respectively 8 matches.)
1	Europa	10	9	1	0	44	5	+39	28	Qualification for the Championship Group
2	Lincoln Red Imps	10	8	1	1	33	7	+26	25	Qualification for the Championship Group
3	St Joseph's	10	7	1	2	49	11	+38	22	Qualification for the Championship Group
4	Lynx	10	6	1	3	26	10	+16	19	Qualification for the Championship Group
5	Mons Calpe	10	6	1	3	21	13	+8	19	Qualification for the Championship Group
6	Lions Gibraltar	10	4	3	3	12	10	+2	15	Qualification for the Championship Group
7	Bruno's Magpies	10	4	2	4	14	16	−2	14	Qualification for the Challenge Group
8	Glacis United	10	3	0	7	10	18	−8	9	Qualification for the Challenge Group
9	Manchester 62	10	2	0	8	8	44	−36	6	Qualification for the Challenge Group
10	Europa Point	10	1	0	9	7	38	−31	3	Qualification for the Challenge Group
11	College 1975	10	0	0	10	8	60	−52	0	Qualification for the Challenge Group
12	Boca Gibraltar (E)	0	0	0	0	0	0	0	0	Club expelled, record expunged

Source: Soccerway
Rules for classification: 1) Points; 2) Goal difference; 3) Goals scored
(E) Excluded

== Results ==
Home \ Away	BOC	BRU	COL	EFC	EPO	GLA	LIN	LGI	LYN	MAN	MON	SJO
Boca Gibraltar												
Bruno's Magpies				1–3	4–0			0–0		3–2		0–3
College 1975		0–3			1–3	1–5	0–8		1–7		0–6	
Europa			9–0			1–0	2–2		3–1		3–0	
Europa Point				0–9			1–6	0–1			2–4	
Glacis United		0–1			3–0		0–3		0–3		0–1	0–5
Lincoln Red Imps		3–0						3–0		2–0		4–2
Lions Gibraltar			3–2	0–1		3–0			0–3			
Lynx		1–1			3–0		2–0			5–0	0–1	1–4
Manchester 62			3–2	0–9	3–1	0–2		0–4				
Mons Calpe		4–1					0–2	0–0		5–0		0–5
St Joseph's			13–1	1–4	4–0			1–1		11–0		

Source: Soccerway
Legend: Blue = home team win; Yellow = draw; Red = away team win.

=== Forfeits for Home Grown Player violations ===
The season suffered early controversy when several teams were forced to forfeit games for violations of the Home Grown Player rule, due to confusion over the new rules regarding time limits for changes if a Home Grown Player is sent off. Below are the games that have been forfeited for rule breaches.

Date	Original score	GFA decision
31 October 2020	Bruno's Magpies 1–0 Boca Gibraltar	3-0 win to Bruno's Magpies
1 November 2020	Glacis United 1–1 Lynx	3-0 win to Lynx
21 November 2020	Glacis United 1–1 Europa Point	3-0 win to Glacis United
28 November 2020	Europa Point 1–2 Boca Gibraltar	3-0 win to Europa Point

Additionally, Boca Gibraltar failed to field a team on 5 December 2020 against Mons Calpe, subsequently forfeiting the tie. After doing so again on 9 December, they were expelled from the league.

== Championship and Challenge groups ==
After 11 games (reduced to 10 after Boca Gibraltar were expelled) the league splits into two groups: the top 6 into the Championship Group, and the bottom 6 (later reduced to 5) into the Challenge Group. The Championship Group will compete for the league title and European qualification places, while the Challenge Group will compete for the GFA Challenge Trophy.

=== Championship Group ===
Pos	Team	Pld	W	D	L	GF	GA	GD	Pts	Qualification
1	Lincoln Red Imps (C)	20	15	3	2	62	13	+49	48	Qualification for the Champions League first qualifying round
2	Europa	20	15	2	3	66	14	+52	47	Qualification for the Europa Conference League first qualifying round (Note: Since the winners of the 2021 Rock Cup, Lincoln Red Imps, qualified for the Champions League based on league position, the Europa Conference League berth awarded to the Cup winners was transferred to the fourth-placed team.)
3	St Joseph's	20	14	3	3	71	20	+51	45	Qualification for the Europa Conference League first qualifying round
4	Mons Calpe	20	10	2	8	36	35	+1	32	Qualification for the Europa Conference League first qualifying round
5	Lynx	20	8	2	10	36	40	−4	26	
6	Lions Gibraltar	20	4	4	12	13	33	−20	16	

Source: Soccerway
Rules for classification: 1) Points; 2) Head-to-head points; 3) Head-to-head goal difference; 4) Goal difference; 5) Goals scored
(C) Champions

=== Championship Group results ===
Home \ Away	EFC	LIN	LGI	LYN	MON	SJO
Europa		0–3	3–0	3–0	2–0	0–2
Lincoln Red Imps	3–1		3–0	1–0	5–1	0–1
Lions Gibraltar	0–2	1–1		0–1	0–4	0–2
Lynx	0–6	0–7	4–0		2–2	0–5
Mons Calpe	0–3	0–4	1–0	3–1		0–4
St Joseph's	1–1	2–2	1–0	3–2	1–4	

Source: Soccerway
Legend: Blue = home team win; Yellow = draw; Red = away team win.

=== Challenge Group ===
Pos	Team	Pld	W	D	L	GF	GA	GD	Pts	Qualification
1	Bruno's Magpies	18	10	2	6	46	27	+19	32	GFA Challenge Trophy and bye in 2021–22 Rock Cup
2	Glacis United	18	10	0	8	35	27	+8	30	
3	Manchester 62	18	5	2	11	25	60	−35	17	
4	College 1975	18	2	2	14	23	81	−58	8	
5	Europa Point	18	1	0	17	10	73	−63	3	

Source: Soccerway
Rules for classification: 1) Points; 2) Head-to-head points; 3) Head-to-head goal difference; 4) Goal difference; 5) Goals scored

=== Challenge Group results ===
Home \ Away	BRU	COL	EPO	GLA	MAN
Bruno's Magpies		3–0	7–0	1–5	4–0
College 1975	1–8		4–1	0–2	0–0
Europa Point	0–4	0–6		0–3	1–4
Glacis United	4–1	4–1	3–1		4–1
Manchester 62	1–4	3–3	4–0	4–0	

Source: Soccerway
Legend: Blue = home team win; Yellow = draw; Red = away team win.

== Season statistics ==
=== Scoring ===
==== Top scorers ====
Rank	Player	Club	Goals
1	(Philippines) Kike Gómez	Lincoln Red Imps	24
2	(Spain) Juanfri	St Joseph's	22
3	(Spain) Rubo Blanco	Bruno's Magpies	19
4	(Spain) Adrián Gallardo	Europa	14
5	(Spain) Boro	St Joseph's	13
6	(Gibraltar) Dylan Borge	Europa	11
6	(Spain) Aritz Hernández	Lynx	11
6	(Argentina) Diego Díaz	Mons Calpe	11
9	(Spain) Luisma Gallardo	College 1975	9
9	(Gibraltar) Liam Walker	Europa	9

==== Hat-tricks ====
Player	For	Against	Result	Date
(Philippines) Kike Gómez^{4}	Lincoln Red Imps	College 1975	8–0 (A)	19 October 2020
(Spain) Alberto Caravaca	Lions Gibraltar	Glacis United	3–0 (H)	24 October 2020
(Gibraltar) Liam Walker	Europa	Europa Point	9–0 (A)	25 October 2020
(England) Luke Wall	Boca Gibraltar	College 1975	6–1 (H)	25 October 2020
(Spain) Aritz Hernández	Lynx	Manchester 62	5–0 (H)	27 October 2020
(Argentina) Diego Díaz^{4}	Mons Calpe	College 1975	6–0 (A)	2 November 2020
(Spain) Juanfri^{4}	St Joseph's	Manchester 62	11–0 (H)	21 November 2020
(Philippines) Ángel Guirado^{4}	St Joseph's	College 1975	13–1 (H)	12 December 2020
(Spain) Boro	St Joseph's	College 1975	13–1 (H)	12 December 2020
(Spain) Adrián Gallardo^{4}	Europa	Manchester 62	9–0 (A)	13 December 2020
(Brazil) Andre Dos Santos^{4}	Mons Calpe	Europa Point	4–2 (A)	14 December 2020
(Gibraltar) Kelvin Morgan	Bruno's Magpies	Europa Point	4–0 (H)	6 March 2021
(Nigeria) Darlington Nwosu	Glacis United	College 1975	4–1 (H)	20 March 2021
(Spain) Rubo Blanco	Bruno's Magpies	College 1975	8–1 (A)	9 April 2021
(Belgium) Elyakim Musoni	Mons Calpe	Lions Gibraltar	4–0 (A)	11 April 2021
(Gibraltar) Adam Gracia^{4}	College 1975	Europa Point	6–0 (A)	18 April 2021
(Spain) Juanfri^{4}	St Joseph's	Lynx	5–0 (A)	27 April 2021
(Spain) Rubo Blanco^{4}	Bruno's Magpies	Europa Point	7–0 (H)	30 April 2021
(Spain) Adrián Gallardo	Europa	Mons Calpe	3–0 (A)	15 May 2021

==== Clean Sheets ====
Rank	Player	Club	Clean sheets
1	(Gibraltar) Christian Lopez	Europa	11
2	(Gibraltar) Jamie Robba	St Joseph's	9
3	(Gibraltar) Kyle Goldwin	Lincoln Red Imps	8
4	(Argentina) Christian Fraiz	Mons Calpe	7
5	(Gibraltar) Bradley Banda	Lynx	6
6	(Spain) Borja Valadés	Lions Gibraltar	5
7	(Scotland) Alan Martin	Bruno's Magpies	4
7	(Argentina) Marcos Zappacosta	Glacis United	4
9	(Gibraltar) Jordan Perez	Bruno's Magpies	3
9	(Spain) Manuel Soler	Lincoln Red Imps	3
9	(Gibraltar) Ayden Viñales	Manchester 62	3

== Awards ==
=== Player of the week ===
Week	Player	Club	Reference
1	(Philippines) Kike Gómez	Lincoln Red Imps	
2	(Gibraltar) Dylan Peacock	Boca Gibraltar	
3	(Spain) Borja Valadés	Lions Gibraltar	
4	Not awarded		
5	(England) Kieren Proctor	Boca Gibraltar	
6	(Spain) Boro	St Joseph's	
7	(Gibraltar) Dylan Borge	Europa	
8	(Spain) Bauti	Lynx	
9	(Spain) Nano	St Joseph's	
10	(Spain) Iván Ruiz	Lions Gibraltar	
11	(Spain) Carra	Lincoln Red Imps	
12	(Ghana) Mustapha Yahaya	Lincoln Red Imps	

=== Monthly awards ===
Month	Player of the Month		Manager of the Month		Reference
Month	Manager	Club	Player	Club	Reference
October	(Spain) Albert Ferri	Lions Gibraltar	(Philippines) Kike Gómez	Lincoln Red Imps	
November	(Spain) Juanfri	St Joseph's	(Spain) Rafa Escobar	Europa	
December	League paused 20 December–22 February				
January	League paused 20 December–22 February				
February	League paused 20 December–22 February				
March					

== See also ==
- 2020–21 Gibraltar Intermediate League
- 2020–21 Gibraltar Women's Football League
