= 2026–27 Gibraltar Football League =

Gibraltar Football League
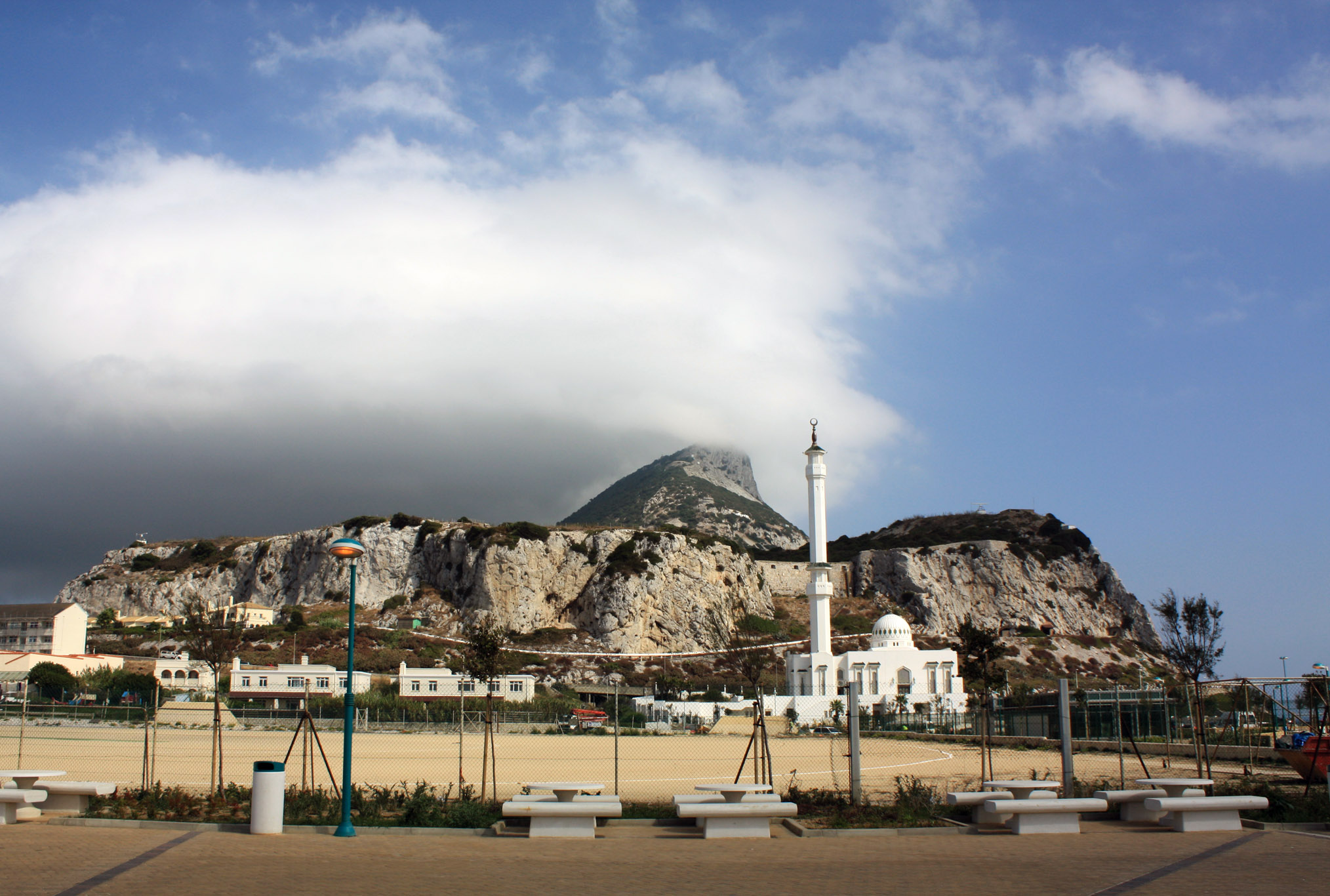
- The Europa Sports Park, where each match is played
- Season: 2026–27
- Dates: 21 August 2026 – 25 April 2027
- Matches: 53
- Goals: 184 (3.47 per match)
- All statistics correct as of 22 November 2026.

The 2026–27 Gibraltar Football League season is the eighth season of the Gibraltar Football League in Gibraltar (and fifth under its current name), and the 128th season of football on the territory overall. Lincoln Red Imps are the reigning champions, winning their fifth successive title on the penultimate weekend of the previous season. 11 teams are expected to compete this season.

Following a rise in the UEFA coefficient rankings, four teams will qualify for European competition. The winners will qualify for the 2027–28 UEFA Champions League first qualifying round. The runners-up, play-off winners and Rock Cup winners will all qualify for the 2027–28 UEFA Conference League first qualifying round.

== Format ==
The 2026–27 season is set to continue with roughly the same format used the previous season. Instead of playing one round of fixtures before splitting, teams will instead play each other twice for a total of 20 games this season. After the second round of games, the top 6 enter the GFL Championship Group, where each team plays each other once to decide the league champion. This season, the Challenge Group returns, with the winner of the 5 team group advancing to playoffs with teams placed 3rd-6th (depending on the winner of the Rock Cup) for a spot in the UEFA Conference League.

Due to the continued reconstruction of Victoria Stadium, games will continue to be played at the Europa Sports Park this season.

== Teams ==
Location of the stadia where all teams play

The Gibraltar Football Association announced on 9 February 2026 that all 12 of last season's GFL members had reapplied for their licenses into the 2026–27 season. FC Magpies, despite announcing a merger the previous year, appeared on the list under their current name. On 11 May it was announced that all clubs would receive a Domestic Gold License except for Lincoln Red Imps, St Joseph's, Europa, Magpies and Mons Calpe, who all received a UEFA Club License; and Manchester 62, who failed to submit complete documentation for their license and subsequently folded. The competing teams are subsequently as follows:

Note: Flags indicate national team as has been defined under FIFA eligibility rules. Players may hold more than one non-FIFA nationality.

Team	Manager	Captain	Kit manufacturer	Club sponsor	2025-26
College 1975	(Spain) Óscar León	(Gibraltar) Thomas Hastings	Nike		9th
Europa	(Italy) Michele Di Piedi	(Gibraltar) Aymen Mouelhi	Kappa	Turicum Private Bank	3rd
Europa Point	(Argentina) Claudio Racino	(Scotland) William Sandford	Legea	FAAS.no	8th
Glacis United	(England) Jonny Elwood	(England) Michael Bakare	Meyba	VIA Sports Experiences	10th
Hound Dogs	(Republic of Ireland) Ryan McCarthy	(England) Harvey Welch	Almer Apparel	Boluda Towage	11th
Lincoln Red Imps	(Spain) Juanma Pavón	(Gibraltar) Bernardo Lopes	Givova	Bet365	1st
Lions Gibraltar	(England) Wally Downes	(Gibraltar) Ben Seaton	VX3	GibSams	5th
Lynx	(Spain) David Guti	(Brazil) André dos Santos	Givova	EWMS	6th
FC Magpies	(Netherlands) Youri Loen	(Gibraltar) Kevagn Ronco	Macron		7th
Mons Calpe	(Spain) Alfonso Cortijo	(Spain) Jesús Ayala	Givova	FanPlay 365	4th
St Joseph's	(Spain) Javi Muñoz	(Spain) Juanma	Macron	Sprint Sports	2nd

=== Managerial changes ===
Team	Outgoing manager	Manner of departure	Date of vacancy	Position in table	Incoming manager	Date of appointment
St Joseph's	(Spain) Alberto Cifuentes	Mutual consent	26 April 2025	Pre-season	(Spain) Javi Muñoz	16 May 2026
Lincoln Red Imps	(Spain) Juanjo Bezares	Promoted to Technical Secretary	13 May 2026	Pre-season	(Spain) Juanma Pavón	19 May 2026
Mons Calpe	(Spain) Juan Marí Sánchez	Signed by St Joseph's	16 May 2026	Pre-season	(Spain) Alfonso Cortijo	4 June 2026
Lynx	(Spain) Rafael Berges	End of contract	31 May 2026	Pre-season	(Spain) David Guti	23 July 2026

== Regular season ==
During the regular season, each team faced each other twice before the league is split into two (with only the top six teams advancing to the GFL Championship Group).

=== League table ===
Pos	Team	Pld	W	D	L	GF	GA	GD	Pts	Qualification (Note: Teams play each other twice (20 matches), before the top six teams advance to the GFL Championship Group.)
1	Lincoln Red Imps	9	8	1	0	28	3	+25	25	Qualification for the GFL Championship Group.
2	St Joseph's	9	7	2	0	33	3	+30	23	Qualification for the GFL Championship Group.
3	Mons Calpe	9	6	2	1	17	7	+10	20	Qualification for the GFL Championship Group.
4	FC Magpies	10	5	4	1	23	10	+13	19	Qualification for the GFL Championship Group.
5	Glacis United	10	5	2	3	19	12	+7	17	Qualification for the GFL Championship Group.
6	Europa	10	4	2	4	13	11	+2	14	Qualification for the GFL Championship Group.
7	Lions Gibraltar	9	4	1	4	15	17	−2	13	Qualification for the Challenge Group
8	Europa Point	10	3	1	6	16	26	−10	10	Qualification for the Challenge Group
9	College 1975	10	1	1	8	8	32	−24	4	Qualification for the Challenge Group
10	Hound Dogs	10	1	1	8	5	37	−32	4	Qualification for the Challenge Group
11	Lynx	10	0	1	9	7	26	−19	1	Qualification for the Challenge Group

Updated to match(es) played on 22 November 2026. Source: Soccerway
Rules for classification: 1) Points; 2) Head-to-head points; 3) Head-to-head goal difference; 4) Fair Play

=== Results ===
Home \ Away	COL	EFC	EPO	GLA	HOU	LIN	LGI	LYN	FCM	MON	SJO
College 1975		0–2		2–4			1–2		2–3	0–2	
Europa				2–2	3–0			2–0	1–1	1–2	
Europa Point	7–0	0–2		0–3			4–2			0–1	
Glacis United					4–0	0–2		1–0	0–3		1–1
Hound Dogs	1–1		1–2			0–5		2–1			0–8
Lincoln Red Imps	6–0	2–0	4–0				3–0				
Lions Gibraltar		1–0		0–4	5–1				1–1		
Lynx	0–2		2–2			1–2	1–4				0–6
FC Magpies			6–1		4–0	1–3		2–0			1–1
Mons Calpe				2–0	4–0	1–1		3–2	1–1		
St Joseph's	5–0	3–0	5–0				2–0			2–1	

Updated to match(es) played on 22 November 2026. Source: Soccerway
Legend: Blue = home team win; Yellow = draw; Red = away team win.

== GFL Championship Group ==
The top six teams from the regular season contest the GFL Championship Group to decide the league champion. Results from the regular season were carried over into this round.

== Challenge Group ==
The bottom five teams will contest the Challenge Group for the first time since the 2022–23 season. The winner of this group will advance to the play-offs.

== Season statistics ==
=== Scoring ===
As of 22 November 2026.

==== Top scorers ====
Rank	Player	Club	Goals
1	(South Africa) Simon van Duivenbooden	Glacis United	10
2	(Spain) Manu Toledano	Lincoln Red Imps	8
3	(Argentina) Lucas Rebagliati	Lions Gibraltar	6
4	(Spain) Álvaro Cascajo	St Joseph's	5
4	(Spain) Francis Ferrón	St Joseph's	5
4	(Spain) Miguel Pérez	St Joseph's	5
7	(Poland) Hugo Bartkowiak	Europa Point	4
7	(Sweden) Andre Nader	Europa Point	4
7	(Spain) Álex Mula	Lincoln Red Imps	4
7	(Russia) Aleksandr Grachev	FC Magpies	4

==== Hat-tricks ====
Player	For	Against	Result	Date
(Argentina) Lucas Rebagliati	Lions Gibraltar	Hound Dogs	5–1 (H)	5 September 2026
(Spain) Francis Ferrón^{4}	St Joseph's	Lynx	6–0 (A)	19 September 2026
(Poland) Hugo Bartkowiak	Europa Point	College 1975	7–0 (H)	11 October 2026
(South Africa) Simon van Duivenbooden	Glacis United	Hound Dogs	4–0 (H)	11 October 2026
(Spain) Manu Toledano^{5}	Lincoln Red Imps	College 1975	6–0 (H)	8 November 2026

=== Clean sheets ===
Rank	Player	Club	Clean sheets
1	(Gibraltar) Bradley Banda	St Joseph's	6
2	(Gibraltar) Harry Victor	Glacis United	4
2	(Spain) Nauzet Santana	Lincoln Red Imps	4
4	(Argentina) Marcos Zappacosta	FC Magpies	3
4	(Poland) Oli Oleksiewicz	Mons Calpe	3
6	(Italy) Camillo de Luca	Europa	2
6	(Gibraltar) Christian Lopez	Europa	2
6	(Gibraltar) Jaylan Hankins	Lincoln Red Imps	2
9	(Spain) Lolo Soler	College 1975	1
9	(Sweden) Alex Jerner	Europa Point	1
9	(Spain) Nando	Lions Gibraltar	1
9	(Gibraltar) Thomas Chakraverty	Mons Calpe	1

== See also ==
- 2026–27 Rock Cup
