= 2021 Rock Cup =

Football tournament season

Tournament details
- Country: Gibraltar
- Dates: 6 April – 21 May 2021
- Teams: 12

Final positions
- Champions: Lincoln Red Imps
- Runners-up: Glacis United

Tournament statistics
- Matches played: 11
- Goals scored: 42 (3.82 per match)
- Top goal scorer(s): Dylan Borge; Adrián Gallardo (4 goals)

The 2021 Gibtelecom Rock Cup was a single-leg knockout tournament contested by clubs from Gibraltar, with twelve clubs participating. The winner of the competition qualified to compete in the 2021–22 UEFA Europa Conference League.

Europa were the defending champions after defeating Gibraltar United by a score of 3–0 in the 2019 final. There was no 2020 winner, as the tournament was abandoned after 2 rounds due to the COVID-19 pandemic.

== First round ==
The draw for the all rounds of this season's tournament was held on 12 March 2021. Seven Gibraltar National League sides entered at this stage along with Hound Dogs, who were competing in the abandoned 2020–21 Gibraltar Intermediate League. Games were played on 6–7 April.

6 April 2021	Bruno's Magpies	1–2	St Joseph's	Gibraltar
18:30	Casares 51'	Report	Juanfri 42'; And. Hernandez 86'	Stadium: Victoria Stadium

6 April 2021	Europa	10–0	Europa Point	Gibraltar
20:45	Walker 5', 21'; Borge 6', 35', 70', 74'; O. González 44'; Yome 58'; A. Gallardo 82', 88'	Report		Stadium: Victoria Stadium

7 April 2021	Glacis United	6–1	Hound Dogs	Gibraltar
18:30	Gallo 9', 70'; Londero 11'; A. Borghi 20'; Galliano 22'; Kaleba 41'	Report	Waine 69'	Stadium: Victoria Stadium

7 April 2021	Lincoln Red Imps	6–0	Lions Gibraltar	Gibraltar
20:45	Gómez 11'; L. Casciaro 21', 66'; Ronan 39'; J. Coombes 85'; G. Torrilla 90+2'	Report		Stadium: Victoria Stadium

== Quarter–finals ==
The 4 teams that received a bye from the first round entered the competition at the quarter-final stage. These 4 teams were: Mons Calpe, Lynx, Manchester 62 and College 1975.

13 April 2021	Europa	3–0	St Joseph's	Gibraltar
18:30	A. Gallardo 5', 23'; Yome 27'	Report		Stadium: Victoria Stadium

13 April 2021	Manchester 62	1–1 (5–4 p)	College 1975	Gibraltar
20:45	Montovio 18'	Report	Franco 33'	Stadium: Victoria Stadium
	Penalties
	Montovio (penalty scored); Ballantine (penalty missed); Negrette (penalty scored); K. Garcia (penalty scored); Pizarro (penalty scored); Pereira (penalty scored)		(penalty scored) L. Gallardo; (penalty scored) Hughes; (penalty scored) Gracia; (penalty missed) J. Rodríguez; (penalty scored) Rubio; (penalty missed) G. Pérez

14 April 2021	Lincoln Red Imps	2–1	Lynx	Gibraltar
18:30	Wall 61'; L. Casciaro 89'	Report	Valdivia 78'	Stadium: Victoria Stadium

14 April 2021	Glacis United	1–1 (4–2 p)	Mons Calpe	Gibraltar
20:45	Londero 57'	Report	Díaz 29'	Stadium: Victoria Stadium
	Penalties
	Galliano (penalty scored); A. Borghi (penalty scored); Nwosu (penalty scored); Londero (penalty scored)		(penalty missed) Ojeda; (penalty missed) N. El Andaloussi; (penalty scored) Dos Santos; (penalty scored) Musoni

== Semi-finals ==
The semi-finals were played on 20–21 April. After winning their match on penalties, Europa were found to be in breach of competition rules and Lincoln were awarded a 3–0 victory.

20 April 2021	Lincoln Red Imps	3–0 vo (a.e.t.) (2–4 p)	Europa	Gibraltar
20:30				Stadium: Victoria Stadium

21 April 2021	Manchester 62	0–1	Glacis United	Gibraltar
20:30		Report	Marquez 35'	Stadium: Victoria Stadium

== Final ==
The final was played on 19 May.

19 May 2021
19:00

Glacis United	0–2	Lincoln Red Imps
	Report	Gómez Bernal 4'; Miguel Carralero 19'

Victoria Stadium, Gibraltar
Referee: Patrick Canepa

== Scorers ==
4 goals

- (Gibraltar) Dylan Borge (Europa)
- (Spain) Adrián Gallardo (Europa)

3 goals

- (Gibraltar) Lee Casciaro (Lincoln Red Imps)

2 goals

- (Gibraltar) Liam Walker (Europa)
- (Gibraltar) Mikey Yome (Europa)
- (Italy) Salvatore Gallo (Glacis United)
- (Argentina) Miguel Londero (Glacis United)
- (Philippines) Kike Gómez (Lincoln Red Imps)

1 goal

- (Spain) Javi Casares (Bruno's Magpies)
- (Gibraltar) Kaylan Franco (College 1975)
- (Spain) Olmo González (Europa)
- (Italy) Alessandro Borghi (Glacis United)
- (Gibraltar) Craig Galliano (Glacis United)
- (France) Quentin Kaleba (Glacis United)
- (Gibraltar) Lython Marquez (Glacis United)
- (England) Joseph Waine (Hound Dogs)
- (Spain) Fernando Carralero (Lincoln Red Imps)
- (Gibraltar) Jamie Coombes (Lincoln Red Imps)
- (Gibraltar) Kian Ronan (Lincoln Red Imps)
- (Gibraltar) Graeme Torrilla (Lincoln Red Imps)
- (England) Luke Wall (Lincoln Red Imps)
- (Spain) Alberto Valdivia (Lynx)
- (Gibraltar) Robert Montovio (Manchester 62)
- (Argentina) Diego Díaz (Mons Calpe)
- (Spain) Juanfri (St Joseph's)
- (Gibraltar) Andrew Hernandez (St Joseph's)

== See also ==
- 2020–21 Gibraltar National League
- 2020–21 Gibraltar Intermediate League
