= 2021–22 Rock Cup =

Football tournament season

Tournament details
- Country: Gibraltar
- Dates: 5 February 2022 – 7 May 2022
- Teams: 12

Final positions
- Champions: Lincoln Red Imps
- Runners-up: Bruno's Magpies

Tournament statistics
- Matches played: 11
- Goals scored: 45 (4.09 per match)

The 2021–22 Rock Cup was a single-leg knockout tournament contested by clubs from Gibraltar, with twelve clubs that participated. The winners, Lincoln Red Imps qualified for the 2022–23 UEFA Champions League, due to finishing first in the 2021–22 Gibraltar National League, so the fourth-placed team, Bruno's Magpies qualified for the 2022–23 UEFA Europa Conference League instead.

Lincoln Red Imps are the defending champions, who also won this edition by defeating Bruno's Magpies in the final, 2–1, after scoring two late goals in the 89th and 90+1st minute to come back from a 1–0 deficit.

== Bracket ==
First round
6 February 2022
Manchester 62	2
Lincoln Red Imps	5
5 February 2022
St Joseph's	9
Hound Dogs	0
6 February 2022
Glacis United	0 (3)
College 1975 (p)	0 (5)
5 February 2022
Europa	6
Lynx	0

Quarter-finals
10 March 2022
Lions Gibraltar	0
Lincoln Red Imps	3
9 March 2022
St Joseph's	1 (3)
College 1975 (p)	1 (4)
8 March 2022
Mons Calpe	1 (3)
Europa (p)	1 (4)
11 March 2022
Bruno's Magpies	3
Europa Point	0

Semi-finals
19 April 2022
Lincoln Red Imps	5
College 1975	0
20 April 2022
Europa	1
Bruno's Magpies	3

Final
7 May 2022
Lincoln Red Imps	2
Bruno's Magpies	1

== First round ==
The draw for the first round of this season's tournament was held on 7 January 2022. Bruno's Magpies received a bye to the quarter-finals by virtue of winning the GFA Challenge Trophy last season.

After the draw, 3 more teams received byes to the next round: Europa Point, Lions Gibraltar and Mons Calpe.

All kick off times are in CET.

5 February 2022	Europa	6–1	Lynx	Gibraltar
16:00	Juampe 11'; Pino 23', 84'; Hernandez 32'; Borge 71'; Willy 88'	Report	Valdivia 37'	Stadium: Victoria Stadium

5 February 2022	St Joseph's	9–0	Hound Dogs	Gibraltar
18:30	Juanfri 10', 30', 38'; Ruíz 45+1'; Valarino 53' (55); Antwi 63'; Boro 81', 84'	Report		Stadium: Victoria Stadium

6 February 2022	Glacis United	0–0 (3–5 p)	College 1975	Gibraltar
16:00		Report		Stadium: Victoria Stadium
	Penalties
	Fernández (penalty scored); Goicoechea (penalty scored); Borghi (penalty missed); Bautista (penalty scored)		(penalty scored) Anaya; (penalty scored) El Yettefti; (penalty scored) Utrera; (penalty scored) Cawthorn; (penalty scored) Guerrero

6 February 2022	Manchester 62	2–5	Lincoln Red Imps	Gibraltar
18:30	Nezval 2'; Lubango 88'	Report	J. Chipolina 12'; Azarkan 30', 37'; Britto 34'; Carralero 73'	Stadium: Victoria Stadium

== Quarter-finals ==
The draw for the quarter-finals took place on 7 February 2022. Matches took place between 8–10 March.

8 March 2022	Mons Calpe	1–1 (3–4 p)	Europa	Gibraltar
20:45	Montovio 71'	Report	Pino 3'	Stadium: Victoria Stadium
	Penalties
	Bado (penalty scored); E. Santos (penalty missed); Cózar (penalty scored); Montovio (penalty scored); Moreno (penalty missed)		(penalty scored) Willy; (penalty missed) Juampe; (penalty scored) Gallardo; (penalty scored) Olmo; (penalty scored) Sánchez

9 March 2022	St Joseph's	1–1 (3–4 p)	College 1975	Gibraltar
20:45	Serra 76'	Report	Gracia 19'	Stadium: Victoria Stadium
	Penalties
	Nano (penalty scored); Juanfri (penalty scored); Juanma (penalty scored); Valarino (penalty missed); Pecci (penalty missed)		(penalty scored) Anaya; (penalty scored) Utrera; (penalty scored) Cawthorn; (penalty scored) Guerrero; (penalty missed) Valero

10 March 2022	Lions Gibraltar	0–3	Lincoln Red Imps	Gibraltar
18:30		Report	Añón 55'; Yahaya 69'; Azarkan 83'	Stadium: Victoria Stadium

11 March 2022	Bruno's Magpies	3–0	Europa Point	Gibraltar
20:45	Galán 48'; Bergonsi 64'; Murr 85'	Report		Stadium: Victoria Stadium

== Semi-finals ==
The draw for the semi-finals took place on 14 March 2022. Ties took place on 19 and 20 April 2022.

19 April 2022	Lincoln Red Imps	5–0	College 1975	Gibraltar
19:30	Azarkan 14'; J. Chipolina 27'; Anaya 45+1' (o.g.); Gómez 71', 72'	Report		Stadium: Victoria Stadium

20 April 2022	Europa	1–3	Bruno's Magpies	Gibraltar
19:30	Gallardo 76'	Report	Pibe 28' (pen.); Bayode 64'; Lopez 83'	Stadium: Victoria Stadium

== Final ==
The final was played on 7 May.

7 May 2022
17:00 CEST

Lincoln Red Imps	2–1	Bruno's Magpies
Añón 89'; Ronan 90+1'		Sastrie 45+1'

Victoria Stadium, Gibraltar

== Scorers ==
4 goals

- (Spain) Adil Azarkan (Lincoln Red Imps)

3 goals

- (Spain) Antonio Pino (Europa)
- (Spain) Juanfri (St Joseph's)

2 goals

- (Gibraltar) Joseph Chipolina (Lincoln Red Imps)
- (Philippines) Kike Gómez (Lincoln Red Imps)
- (Spain) Boro (St Joseph's)
- (Gibraltar) Julian Valarino (St Joseph's)

1 goal

- (England) Olatunde Bayode (Bruno's Magpies)
- (Brazil) Edenilson Bergonsi (Bruno's Magpies)
- (Spain) José Galán (Bruno's Magpies)
- (Gibraltar) Julian Lopez (Bruno's Magpies)
- (England) Nathan Murr (Bruno's Magpies)
- (Argentina) Pibe (Bruno's Magpies)
- (Gibraltar) Adam Gracia (College 1975)
- (Gibraltar) Dylan Borge (Europa)
- (Spain) Adrián Gallardo (Europa)
- (Gibraltar) Anthony Hernandez (Europa)
- (Spain) Juampe (Europa)
- (Spain) Willy (Europa)
- (Spain) Javier Añón (Lincoln Red Imps)
- (Gibraltar) Ethan Britto (Lincoln Red Imps)
- (Spain) Fernando Carralero (Lincoln Red Imps)
- (Ghana) Mustapha Yahaya (Lincoln Red Imps)
- (Spain) Alberto Valdivia (Lynx)
- (Angola) Alberto Lubango (Manchester 62)
- (Australia) Matt Nezval (Manchester 62)
- (Gibraltar) Robert Montovio (Mons Calpe)
- (Ghana) Ishmael Antwi (St Joseph's)
- (Spain) Iván Ruíz (St Joseph's)
- (Gibraltar) Jamie Serra (St Joseph's)

Own goals

- (Spain) Javi Anaya (College 1975) vs Lincoln Red Imps

== See also ==
- 2021–22 Gibraltar National League
- 2021–22 Gibraltar Intermediate League - Hound Dogs participate in this league.
