= 2022–23 Gibraltar Intermediate Cup =

Tournament details
- Country: Gibraltar
- Dates: 9 January 2023 – 16 April 2023
- Teams: 11

Final positions
- Champions: Manchester 62 Intermediate (1st title)
- Runners-up: St Joseph's Intermediate

Tournament statistics
- Matches played: 33
- Goals scored: 123 (3.73 per match)

The 2022–23 Gibraltar Intermediate Cup was a single-leg knockout tournament played by under-23 clubs from Gibraltar, who compete in the Gibraltar Intermediate League.

The champions of the first edition were Mons Calpe, who defeated Manchester 62 4–1 in the final on 15 January 2019. This second edition will see the tournament return for the first time in 4 years, with a new format.

== Format ==
The new format was revealed along with the draw in December 2022. Teams will be split into 3 groups (two groups of 4 and one group of 3), with the group winners and best runner-up progressing to the semi-finals.

== Group stage ==
=== Group 1 ===
Pos	Team	Pld	W	D	L	GF	GA	GD	Pts	Qualification
1	Lions Gibraltar Intermediate	6	4	1	1	19	6	+13	13	Qualification for Semifinals
2	College 1975 Intermediate	6	3	0	3	17	17	0	9	
3	Bruno's Magpies Intermediate	6	2	1	3	8	13	−5	7	
4	Lynx Intermediate	6	2	0	4	7	15	−8	6	

Source: GFA
Rules for classification: 1) points; 2) goal difference; 3) number of goals scored

10 January 2023	Bruno's Magpies Intermediate	0–3	Lions Gibraltar Intermediate	Victoria Stadium
20:45			Preston 42'; Lee 87'; Mai 90+3'	Referee: Jose Luis Jimenez

16 January 2023	College 1975 Intermediate	0–4	Lynx Intermediate	Victoria Stadium
18:30			A. Olivares 23'; Noble 54'; Salah 82'; Canas 86'	Referee: Sergio Liñan

23 January 2023	College 1975 Intermediate	2–4	Bruno's Magpies Intermediate	Victoria Stadium
20:45	Gracia 37'; Bartkowiak 59'		Wahnon 30', 41'; Levy 32'; Mason 71'	Referee: Aaron Perales

26 January 2023	Lions Gibraltar Intermediate	2–1	Lynx Intermediate	Victoria Stadium
20:45	Walton 11'; Gaivizo 45+2' (pen.)		Canas 90+5'	Referee: Jose Antonio Diaz

31 January 2023	Bruno's Magpies Intermediate	3–1	Lynx Intermediate	Victoria Stadium
18:30	C. Carnegie 33'; Del Rio 38', 40'		Salah 51'	Referee: Sergio Liñan

2 February 2023	Lions Gibraltar Intermediate	0–3	College 1975 Intermediate	Victoria Stadium
20:45			Gracia 49', 62', 80'	Referee: David Murphy

6 February 2023	Lynx Intermediate	1–0	Bruno's Magpies Intermediate	Victoria Stadium
18:30	Salah 45'			Referee: Ruben Navarro

7 February 2023	College 1975 Intermediate	1–9	Lions Gibraltar Intermediate	Victoria Stadium
18:30	Codali 15'		Hanglin 26'; C. Gaivizo 35', 63'; Mai 54'; Walton 56', 82'; Green 59', 64'; Preston 67'	Referee: Ruben Navarro

13 February 2023	Lynx Intermediate	0–6	College 1975 Intermediate	Victoria Stadium
18:30			Rodgers 12'; Gracia 24', 29'; J. Zammitt 66'; Codali 70'; McMillan-López 73'	Referee: Juan Jose Villada

14 February 2023	Lions Gibraltar Intermediate	1–1	Bruno's Magpies Intermediate	Victoria Stadium
18:30	Labra 90+5'		Del Rio 80'	Referee: Ruben Navarro

21 February 2023	Bruno's Magpies Intermediate	0–5	College 1975 Intermediate	Victoria Stadium
18:30			Giampaoli 36', 52'; Franco 66'; K. Castle 76' (pen.); Codali 82'	Referee: Martin Connolly

21 February 2023	Lynx Intermediate	0–4	Lions Gibraltar Intermediate	Victoria Stadium
20:45			Preston 37', 46'; Delgado 85'; Lee 89'	Referee: Jose Antonio Delgado

=== Group 2 ===
Pos	Team	Pld	W	D	L	GF	GA	GD	Pts	Qualification
1	St Joseph's Intermediate	6	4	1	1	12	4	+8	13	Qualification for Semifinals
2	Europa Intermediate	6	3	1	2	15	9	+6	10	
3	Europa Point Intermediate	6	3	0	3	11	13	−2	9	
4	Hound Dogs	6	1	0	5	3	15	−12	3	

Source: GFA
Rules for classification: 1) points; 2) goal difference; 3) number of goals scored

9 January 2023	Hound Dogs	0–5	Europa Intermediate	Victoria Stadium
18:30			Vinet 24', 67'; Poggio 41'; Gibson 71'; Orihuela 78'	Referee: Martin Connolly

9 January 2023	Europa Point Intermediate	1–3	St Joseph's Intermediate	Victoria Stadium
20:45	McMillan-López 53'		Zeulevoet 62' (pen.); A. El Ouahabi 72'; Ka. Gonzalez 80'	Referee: Aaron Perales

23 January 2023	St Joseph's Intermediate	0–1	Hound Dogs	Victoria Stadium
18:30			Celecia 90'	Referee: Juan Jose Villada

24 January 2023	Europa Intermediate	2–3	Europa Point Intermediate	Victoria Stadium
18:30	Thorne 2'; Byrne 26'		R. Wilson 7'; Westerberg 41'; Hammond 66'	Referee: Martin Connolly

30 January 2023	Europa Intermediate	2–2	St Joseph's Intermediate	Victoria Stadium
18:30	Pizarro 4'; Castle 22'		Zeulevoet 33'; Ka. Gonzalez 39'	Referee: Martin Connolly

31 January 2023	Europa Point Intermediate	3–0	Hound Dogs	Victoria Stadium
20:45	Krebs 27'; Black 49'; Cruz 89'			Referee: Esteban Cabrera

6 February 2023	Europa Intermediate	2–1	Hound Dogs	Victoria Stadium
20:45	Caetano 30'; Gibson 77'		J. Tavares 16'	Referee: Aaron Perales

7 February 2023	St Joseph's Intermediate	3–0; Awarded (Note: Initially finished 4-2 to Europa Point, but result awarded to St Joseph's after Europa Point were found to breach the Home Grown Player rules.)	Europa Point Intermediate	Victoria Stadium
20:45	J. Segui 1'; Ka. Gonzalez 16'		Krebs 45' (pen.); Hardiman 71'; Black 72', 89'	Referee: Esteban Cabrera

13 February 2023	Hound Dogs	0–2	St Joseph's Intermediate	Victoria Stadium
20:45			Guest 43', 57'	Referee: Mario Morales

22 February 2023	St Joseph's Intermediate	2–0	Europa Intermediate	Victoria Stadium
18:30	Ka. Gonzalez 36'; Zeulevoet 41'			Referee: Juan Jose Villada

23 February 2023	Hound Dogs	1–3	Europa Point Intermediate	Victoria Stadium
20:45	A. Harrison 75'		Mbye 15' (pen.); Hardiman 45'; Plumb 87'	Referee: Jose Antonio Diaz

28 February 2023	Europa Point Intermediate	1–4	Europa Intermediate	Victoria Stadium
20:45	Hammond 85'		Gibson 15'; Ledesma 41', 45', 76'	Referee: Juan Jose Villada

=== Group 3 ===
Pos	Team	Pld	W	D	L	GF	GA	GD	Pts	Qualification
1	Lincoln Red Imps Intermediate	4	2	0	2	8	6	+2	6	Qualification for Semifinals
2	Manchester 62 Intermediate	4	2	0	2	9	7	+2	6	Qualification for Semifinals
3	Glacis United Intermediate	4	2	0	2	7	11	−4	6	

Source: GFA
Rules for classification: 1) points; 2) goal difference; 3) number of goals scored

10 January 2023	Lincoln Red Imps Intermediate	3–0	Glacis United Intermediate	Victoria Stadium
18:30	K. Clinton 12'; Sciortino 35'; Omari 87' (pen.)			Referee: Juan Jose Villada

24 January 2023	Manchester 62 Intermediate	2–1	Lincoln Red Imps Intermediate	Victoria Stadium
20:45	Viagas 63'; Segovia 68' (o.g.)		Sciortino 70' (pen.)	Referee: Denis Perez

30 January 2023	Glacis United Intermediate	4–2	Manchester 62 Intermediate	Victoria Stadium
20:45	Julerson 67' (pen.); J. Britto 71'; Ba 73'; Prescott 82'		F. Carnegie 20'; Viagas 41'	Referee: Jose Antonio Delgado

9 February 2023	Manchester 62 Intermediate	4–0	Glacis United Intermediate	Victoria Stadium
20:45	Ke. Gonzalez 7'; K. Garcia 11'; T. Pizarro 87', 89'			Referee: Juan Jose Villada

14 February 2023	Glacis United Intermediate	3–2	Lincoln Red Imps Intermediate	Victoria Stadium
20:45	Julerson 30'; Akroum 71', 87'		Sciortino 35', 55'	Referee: Aaron Perales

22 February 2023	Lincoln Red Imps Intermediate	2–1	Manchester 62 Intermediate	Victoria Stadium
20:45	J. Duarte 45'; Sciortino 58'		Laguea 78' (o.g.)	Referee: Denis Perez

== Semifinals ==
2 April 2023	Lincoln Red Imps Intermediate	0–1	St Joseph's Intermediate	Gibraltar
16:00			Duo 88'	Stadium: Victoria Stadium; Referee: Denis Perez

2 April 2023	Lions Gibraltar Intermediate	1–2	Manchester 62 Intermediate	Gibraltar
19:30	Preston 76'		O'Hara 31'; Benítez 47'	Stadium: Victoria Stadium; Referee: Eduardo Vasquez

== Final ==
16 April 2023	St Joseph's Intermediate	0–4	Manchester 62 Intermediate	Gibraltar
20:00			Ke. Gonzalez 29'; Benítez 33', 61'; T. Pizarro 80'	Stadium: Victoria Stadium; Referee: Denis Perez

== Scorers ==
6 goals

- (Gibraltar) Adam Gracia (College 1975 Intermediate)

5 goals

- (Gibraltar) Jonathan Sciortino (Lincoln Red Imps Intermediate)
- (England) Liam Preston (Lions Gibraltar Intermediate)

4 goals

- (Gibraltar) Kayden Gonzalez (St Joseph's Intermediate)

3 goals

- (Gibraltar) Matthew Codali (College 1975 Intermediate)
- (Gibraltar) Mitch Gibson (Europa Intermediate)
- (Spain) Manuel Ledesma (Europa Intermediate)
- (England) Stevie Black (Europa Point Intermediate)
- (England) Charlie Hardiman (Europa Point Intermediate)
- Charles Gaivizo (Lions Gibraltar Intermediate)
- Luigi Walton (Lions Gibraltar Intermediate)
- (Gibraltar) Omar Salah (Lynx Intermediate)
- (Spain) Samu Benítez (Manchester 62 Intermediate)
- (Gibraltar) Theo Pizarro (Manchester 62 Intermediate)
- (Belgium) Maxim Zeulevoet (St Joseph's Intermediate)

2 goals

- (Gibraltar) Julian Del Rio (Bruno's Magpies Intermediate)
- (Gibraltar) Ashton Wahnon (Bruno's Magpies Intermediate)
- (Argentina) Ignacio Giampaoli (College 1975 Intermediate)
- (British Virgin Islands) Charley McMillan-Lopez (College 1975 Intermediate) (Note: Includes one goal for Europa Point Intermediate.)
- (Gibraltar) Jaron Vinet (Europa Intermediate)
- (Gibraltar) Dion Hammond (Europa Point Intermediate)
- (Sweden) Kristoffer Krebs (Europa Point Intermediate)
- (France) Hicham Akroum (Glacis United Intermediate)
- (Brazil) Julerson (Glacis United Intermediate)
- Evan Green (Lions Gibraltar Intermediate)
- (England) Jack Lee (Lions Gibraltar Intermediate)
- (Spain) Mai (Lions Gibraltar Intermediate)
- (Spain) Manuel Canas (Lynx Intermediate)
- (Gibraltar) Kevan Gonzalez (Manchester 62 Intermediate)
- (Gibraltar) Stefan Viagas (Manchester 62 Intermediate)
- (Gibraltar) Jairon Guest (St Joseph's Intermediate)

1 goal

- (Gibraltar) Cameron Carnegie (Bruno's Magpies Intermediate)
- (Spain) Aaron Levy (Bruno's Magpies Intermediate)
- (Gibraltar) Christian Mason (Bruno's Magpies Intermediate)
- (Poland) Hugo Bartkowiak (College 1975 Intermediate)
- (Gibraltar) Kivan Castle (College 1975 Intermediate)
- (Gibraltar) Kaylan Franco (College 1975 Intermediate)
- (Gibraltar) Daniel Rodgers (College 1975 Intermediate)
- (Gibraltar) Jyron Zammitt (College 1975 Intermediate)
- (Gibraltar) Rhys Byrne (Europa Intermediate)
- (Gibraltar) James Caetano (Europa Intermediate)
- (Gibraltar) James Castle (Europa Intermediate)
- (Spain) Christian Orihuela (Europa Intermediate)
- (Gibraltar) Declan Pizarro (Europa Intermediate)
- (Gibraltar) Karl Poggio (Europa Intermediate)
- (Gibraltar) Stefan Thorne (Europa Intermediate)
- (Gibraltar) Andrew Cruz (Europa Point Intermediate)
- (Sweden) Modoumatarr Mbye (Europa Point Intermediate)
- (Gibraltar) Matthew Plumb (Europa Point Intermediate)
- (Sweden) Jonathan Westerberg (Europa Point Intermediate)
- (England) Reed Wilson (Europa Point Intermediate)
- (Italy) Soulemane Ba (Glacis United Intermediate)
- (Gibraltar) Julian Britto (Glacis United Intermediate)
- (Gibraltar) Cecil Prescott (Glacis United Intermediate)
- (Gibraltar) Anthony Celecia (Hound Dogs)
- (England) Ashley Harrison (Hound Dogs)
- (Gibraltar) Jian Tavares (Hound Dogs)
- (Gibraltar) Kyle Clinton (Lincoln Red Imps Intermediate)
- (Gibraltar) Jaylen Duarte (Lincoln Red Imps Intermediate)
- (Gibraltar) Samir Omari (Lincoln Red Imps Intermediate)
- (Spain) Luismi Delgado (Lions Gibraltar Intermediate)
- Aaram Hanglin (Lions Gibraltar Intermediate)
- (Gibraltar) Leonard Noble (Lynx Intermediate)
- (Gibraltar) Aiden Olivares (Lynx Intermediate)
- (Gibraltar) Fraser Carnegie (Manchester 62 Intermediate)
- (Gibraltar) Kieron Garcia (Manchester 62 Intermediate)
- (Republic of Ireland) Aodhán O'Hara (Manchester 62 Intermediate)
- (Gibraltar) Dylan Duo (St Joseph's Intermediate)
- (Gibraltar) Ahmed El Ouahabi (St Joseph's Intermediate)
- (Gibraltar) Jesse Segui (St Joseph's Intermediate)

Own goals

- (Gibraltar) Kyle Segovia (Lincoln Red Imps Intermediate) vs Manchester 62 Intermediate
- (Gibraltar) Julian Laguea (Lincoln Red Imps Intermediate) vs Manchester 62 Intermediate

== See also ==
- 2022–23 Gibraltar Intermediate League
