= Kian Ronan =

Gibraltarian footballer

Personal information
- Full name: Kian Joe Ronan
- Date of birth: 9 March 2001 (age 25)
- Place of birth: Harlow, England
- Positions: Defender; midfielder

Team information
- Current team: Chelmsford City
- Number: 2

Youth career
- –2019: Ipswich Town

Senior career*
Years	Team	Apps	(Gls)
2018–2019	Ipswich Town	0	(0)
2018	→ Mildenhall Town (loan)	6	(0)
2019	→ Leyton Athletic (loan)	5	(0)
2019–2020	Manchester 62	13	(6)
2020–2023	Lincoln Red Imps	53	(9)
2023–2025	King's Lynn Town	64	(3)
2025–	Chelmsford City	35	(1)

International career^{‡}
2016	Gibraltar U16		
2016	Gibraltar U17	3	(0)
2017–2019	Gibraltar U19	5	(1)
2018–2020	Gibraltar U21	7	(0)
2020–	Gibraltar	55	(0)
- * Club domestic league appearances and goals as of 21 November 2026 ‡ National team caps and goals as of 18 November 2026

Kian Joe Ronan (born 9 March 2001) is an English-born Gibraltarian footballer who plays as a defender or midfielder for Chelmsford City and the Gibraltar national team.

== Club career ==
=== Youth career ===
Ronan played his youth football at Ipswich Town, and made two appearances in the 2018–19 FA Youth Cup.

=== Senior career ===
==== Work experience loans ====
On 14 November 2018, Ronan joined Isthmian League North team Mildenhall Town on loan. Later that season, he also spent time with Leyton Athletic in the Essex Senior League, playing five games. He was released by Ipswich at the end of the season.

==== Manchester 62 ====
In 2019, Ronan joined Gibraltar National League team Manchester 62. While at the Red Devils, he was occasionally utilised as a makeshift striker, scoring six goals for the club in 13 games during his only season at the club.

==== Lincoln Red Imps ====
On 8 July 2020, he signed with Gibraltar Premier League side Lincoln Red Imps. After three seasons in which he won the Gibraltar Football League three times and the Rock Cup twice, alongside a season in the group stage of the inaugural UEFA Conference League, he left the club upon the expiry of his contract in July 2023.

==== King's Lynn Town ====
After his contract with Lincoln Red Imps ended, Ronan returned to England and joined National League North side King's Lynn Town. After two seasons at the club, he left the Linnets on 12 June 2025 upon the expiry of his contract.

==== Chelmsford City ====
On 19 June 2025, Ronan signed for National League South side Chelmsford City.

== International career ==
Ronan has represented Gibraltar at various youth levels.

Ronan made his international debut for Gibraltar on 5 September 2020 in the UEFA Nations League against San Marino.

== Career statistics ==
=== International ===
As of match played 16 November 2026

Gibraltar
Year	Apps	Goals
2020	4	0
2021	10	0
2022	7	0
2023	8	0
2024	8	0
2025	8	0
2026	10	0
Total	55	0

== Honours ==
Lincoln Red Imps

- Gibraltar National League: 2020–21, 2021–22, 2022–23
- Rock Cup: 2021, 2022
- Pepe Reyes Cup: 2022
