= Ayew =

Ayew is a surname. Notable people with the surname include:

- Abédi Ayew, better known professionally as Abedi Pele (born 1964), Ghanaian footballer, or his sons:
  - Ibrahim Ayew (born 1988), Ghanaian footballer
  - André Ayew (born 1989), Ghanaian footballer
  - Jordan Ayew (born 1991), Ghanaian footballer
- Kwame Ayew (born 1973), Ghanaian footballer
