= Urko =

Urko is a Basque male given name. Notable people with the name include:

- Urko Arroyo (born 1987), Spanish footballer
- Urko Berrade (born 1997), Spanish cyclist
- Urko González de Zárate (born 2001), Spanish footballer
- Urko Izeta (born 1999), Spanish footballer
- Urko Olazabal (born 1978), Spanish actor
- Urko Pardo (born 1983), Belgian football goalkeeper who played on the Cyprus national team
- Urko Vera (born 1987), Spanish footballer
- Cibernético and Urko, ring names of Mexican professional wrestler Octavio López Arreola (born 1975)
