= Mustapha Yahaya =

Ghanaian footballer (born 1994)

Personal information
- Date of birth: 9 January 1994 (age 32)
- Place of birth: Ejisu, Ghana
- Height: 1.86 m (6 ft 1 in)
- Position: Midfielder

Team information
- Current team: Lincoln Red Imps
- Number: 8

Youth career
- Consult Academy
- 2012–2016: Twente

Senior career*
Years	Team	Apps	(Gls)
2013–2016	Jong FC Twente	22	(0)
2016–2019	Europa	62	(6)
2019–	Lincoln Red Imps	71	(11)
- * Club domestic league appearances and goals as of 9 November 2024

Mustapha Yahaya (born 9 January 1994) is a Ghanaian footballer who plays as a midfielder for Lincoln Red Imps.

== Career ==
=== Early career ===
Yahaya started his career in Ghana before moving to join FC Twente youth side Jong FC Twente. He played in the U-19 before being promoted to the U-21 side.

=== Europa FC ===
In July 2016, Yahaya joined Gibraltar-side Europa FC on a free transfer. On 14 July 2016, he made his debut in the UEFA Europa League, playing the full 90 minutes in a 1–0 loss to AIK Fotboll. He also played the full 90 minutes in the return leg on 21 July 2017, which ended in the same 1–0 scoreline as the first leg. On 26 June 2017, he played the full 90 minutes in the UEFA Champions league knockout match against The New Saints F.C. which ended in a 2–1 victory for his club. He also played the full time in the return leg on 4 July 2017, with the match ending in a 1–3 loss culminating to a 3–4 on aggregate ending their campaign at 1st qualifying round.

=== Lincoln Red Imps ===
In August 2019, Yahaya joined fellow Gibraltar-side Lincoln Red Imps. On 27 August 2020, he featured in the club's UEFA Europa League campaign match against Union Titus Pétange, and scored the second goal in the 95th minute of added time to help push the club to a 2–0 victory and help them qualify for the next round of the competition. He played the full 90 minutes in the club's 5–0 loss to Rangers on 17 September 2019, ending their run in the competition.

== Honours ==
Europa

- Gibraltar Premier Division: 2016–17
- Rock Cup: 2016–17, 2017–18, 2019
- Pepe Reyes Cup: 2018

Lincoln Red Imps

- Gibraltar Premier Division: 2020–21, 2021–22, 2022–23
- Rock Cup: 2021, 2021–22
- Pepe Reyes Cup: 2022

Individual

- Gibraltar Premier Division Midfielder of the Season: 2018–19
