= Ethan Britto =

Gibraltarian footballer

Personal information
- Date of birth: 30 November 2000 (age 25)
- Place of birth: Gibraltar
- Positions: Left-back; left wing

Team information
- Current team: Lincoln Red Imps
- Number: 20

Youth career
- –2015: Lincoln Red Imps

Senior career*
Years	Team	Apps	(Gls)
2015–2018	Lincoln Red Imps	15	(1)
2017	→ Europa Point (loan)	11	(2)
2018–2019	Mons Calpe	17	(1)
2019–	Lincoln Red Imps	115	(20)

International career^{‡}
2014–2016	Gibraltar U17	7	(1)
2017–2022	Gibraltar U21	8	(0)
2018–	Gibraltar	48	(1)
- * Club domestic league appearances and goals as of 22 November 2026 ‡ National team caps and goals as of 15 November 2026

Ethan Britto (born 30 November 2000) is a Gibraltarian footballer who plays for Lincoln Red Imps and the Gibraltar national team. Primarily a left-back, he can also play anywhere along the left flank and has often been utilised as a winger in a front three.

== Club career ==
Britto began his career at Lincoln Red Imps, breaking through at the age of 15. In January 2017, he joined Europa Point on loan along with 4 other players including Jaron Vinet and Tjay De Barr, to gain experienced at the newly promoted side. However, despite scoring twice in 11 games he was unable to prevent the side's relegation and returned to Lincoln at the end of the season. In summer 2018, he moved to Mons Calpe in order to gain more first team football, but again returned to Lincoln the next summer amidst financial problems for the Calpeans. Despite limited opportunities, Britto still impressed and earned a trial at UD Las Palmas alongside Julian Del Rio in February 2020.

== International career ==
Britto made his international debut for Gibraltar on 13 October 2018, coming on as a substitute in the 85th minute for Andrew Hernandez in the 2018–19 UEFA Nations League D match against Armenia. The match finished as a 1–0 away win for Gibraltar, their first ever competitive victory.

== Career statistics ==
=== International ===
As of match played 13 November 2026

Gibraltar
Year	Apps	Goals
2018	1	0
2019	7	0
2020	1	0
2021	7	0
2022	10	0
2023	8	0
2024	9	1
2025	3	0
2026	2	0
Total	48	1

Scores and results list Gibraltar's goal tally first, score column indicates score after each Britto’s goal

List of international goals scored by Ethan Britto
No.	Date	Venue	Opponent	Score	Result	Competition
1	10 October 2024	Europa Point Stadium, Gibraltar	San Marino	1–0	1–0	2024–25 UEFA Nations League D

== Honours ==
Lincoln Red Imps

- Gibraltar Premier Division / Gibraltar National League: 2017–18, 2020–21
- Rock Cup: 2016
