= Rubo Blanco =

Spanish footballer

Personal information
- Full name: Rubén Blanco Rodríguez
- Date of birth: 15 June 1993 (age 33)
- Place of birth: Soria, Spain
- Height: 1.83 m (6 ft 0 in)
- Position: Forward

Team information
- Current team: Cristo Atlético

Youth career
- Numancia

Senior career*
Years	Team	Apps	(Gls)
2011–2012	Numancia B		
2011–2012	Numancia	1	(0)
2012–2013	→ Real Ávila (loan)	18	(4)
2013	→ Collado Villalba (loan)		
2013–2014	Alavés B		
2014–2015	Langreo	18	(2)
2015	Tuilla	12	(4)
2015	Peña Deportiva	4	(0)
2015–2016	Ceares	13	(2)
2016	Atlético Tordesillas	17	(5)
2016–2017	Borja	12	(3)
2017	Atlético Tordesillas	14	(6)
2017–2018	Mons Calpe	24	(15)
2018	Europa	3	(0)
2019–2020	Ávila	4	(2)
2020–2021	Bruno's Magpies	18	(19)
2021–2022	Lanzarote	14	(5)
2022–2023	Somozas	41	(13)
2023–2024	Arosa	35	(7)
2024–	Cristo Atlético	6	(1)
- * Club domestic league appearances and goals as of 13 October 2024

Rubén Blanco Rodríguez (born 15 June 1993), simply known as Rubo Blanco is a Spanish footballer who plays for Cristo Atlético as a forward.

== Club career ==
Born in Madrid, Blanco graduated from the youth academy of CD Numancia and made his debut with the senior team in a 0–0 draw against FC Cartagena on 3 December 2011. On 3 August 2012, he was loaned out to Real Ávila CF. After a stint with Deportivo Alavés B, Blanco joined Segunda División B club UP Langreo in 2014. After having contributed with 2 goals in eighteen matches, he stepped a division down and joined CD Tuilla in January 2015.

On 14 July 2015, Blanco moved to fellow club SCR Peña Deportiva, after agreeing to a one-year deal. In the subsequent years, he played for UC Ceares, Atlético Tordesillas and SD Borja (scoring three goals in 12 appearances), before returning to Atlético Tordesillas on 23 January 2017 for personal reasons.

On 22 August 2017, Blanco moved abroad and signed with Gibraltarian club Mons Calpe. After scoring 15 goals in his first season at the club, he was signed by Europa. However, after just 3 league games, Rubo left the club after being found guilty of irregular betting activities alongside a number of other Europa FC players. For his part, he was banned for 6 months by the Gibraltar Football Association.

== Statistics ==
As of 2 May 2018

Club	Season	League			Cup		Other		Total	
Club	Season	Division	Apps	Goals	Apps	Goals	Apps	Goals	Apps	Goals
Numancia	2011–12	Segunda División	1	0	0	0	—		1	0
Real Ávila (loan)	2012–13	Tercera División	18	4	1	0	—		19	4
Collado Villalba (loan)	2012–13	Tercera División			—		—			
Alavés B	2013–14	Tercera División			—		—			
Langreo	2014–15	Segunda División B	18	2	0	0	—		18	2
Tuilla	2014–15	Tercera División	12	4	0	0	1 (Note: Appearance in promotion play-offs)	0	13	4
Peña Deportiva	2014–15	Tercera División	4	0	0	0	—		4	0
Ceares	2015–16	Tercera División	13	2	0	0	—		13	2
Atlético Tordesillas	2015–16	Tercera División	17	5	0	0	—		17	5
Borja	2016–17	Tercera División	12	3	0	0	—		12	3
Atlético Tordesillas	2016–17	Tercera División	14	6	0	0	—		14	6
Mons Calpe	2017–18	Gibraltar Premier Division	22	13	3	6	—		25	19
Career total			132	39	4	6	1	0	137	45
