= Rafa Bado =

Spanish-Gibraltarian footballer

Personal information
- Full name: Rafael Jesús Bado Blanco
- Date of birth: 30 December 1984 (age 41)
- Place of birth: La Línea de la Concepción, Spain
- Height: 1.80 m (5 ft 11 in)
- Position: Midfielder

Team information
- Current team: AD Taraguilla (head coach)

Senior career*
Years	Team	Apps	(Gls)
2005–2007	UD Tesorillo	25	(1)
2005	→ Los Barrios (loan)	2	(0)
2007	Xerez B	1	(0)
2007	UD Manilva Sabinillas	6	(1)
2007–2008	AD Los Cortijillos	?	(1)
2008	Atlético Zabal		
2008–2009	UD Pastores	7	(0)
2009–2010	Los Barrios	29	(2)
2011	UD Castellar	1	(0)
2011–2013	Lynx		
2013–2015	Lynx	26	(4)
2015–2018	Lions Gibraltar	18	(0)
2018–2019	Mons Calpe	3	(0)
2019	Lions Gibraltar	6	(1)
2019–2020	UD Castellar	6	(0)
2022–2023	AD Taraguilla	18	(1)

International career^{‡}
2014	Gibraltar	2	(0)

Managerial career
- 2016: Lions Gibraltar (interim)
- 2016–2018: Lions Gibraltar (player-manager)
- 2026–: AD Taraguilla
- * Club domestic league appearances and goals as of 21:00, 26 March 2023 (UTC) ‡ National team caps and goals as of 11 January 2015

Rafael Jesús Bado Blanco (born 30 December 1984) is a Spanish-Gibraltarian former footballer who last played for Primera Andaluza Cádiz side AD Taraguilla, and formerly represented the Gibraltar national team, as a central midfielder. From 2016 to 2018 he served as player-manager of Lions Gibraltar, and currently serves as head coach of AD Taraguilla.

== Club career ==
=== Early career in Spain ===
Born and raised in Spain, Bado spent the majority of his career playing in the lower divisions of Spanish football, beginning his career at UD Tesorillo. Spending the majority of his time at amateur clubs on the border between Spain and Gibraltar such as Atlético Zabal in 2008, he most notably spent time at Xerez's B team along with two spells with UD Los Barrios, once on loan from his first club UD Tesorillo in 2005, and again returning to them in 2009 as they finished third in the 2009–10 Tercera División, scoring twice in 29 games as they narrowly missed out on promotion to the third tier of Spanish football. After leaving Los Barrios at the end of the season, he spent a few months out of football before returning for UD Castellar towards the end of the 2010–11 season. He ended his journeyman career in Spain after playing for 8 clubs in 6 years, moving to Gibraltar, where his family came from, to work as a store clerk and revive his football career.

=== Lynx ===
In 2011, he moved to Lynx, at the time in the Gibraltar Second Division, helping them gain promotion to the Gibraltar Premier Division in his first season. Once in the Gibraltar top flight, he remained a key figure as Lynx finished 4th in Gibraltar's final season as a 6 team league before expanding to 8 teams, in order to match requirements for the territory's UEFA entry in 2013 and subsequent qualification to the UEFA Champions League and UEFA Europa League. Even with Lynx's continued rebuilding and improvements on the field, he stayed in the first team as they finished 3rd in the 2013–14 season, narrowly missing out on Europa League qualification but impressing enough to earn a callup to the Gibraltar national football team in September 2015. His final season at Lynx saw another 3rd-place finish, before he entered talks with the ambitious Lions Gibraltar, who at the time had just been taken over by Hercules Sports Promotion.

=== Lions Gibraltar ===
Like his time at Lynx, Bado was a regular in the Lions midfield, helping his new team finish 4th at the end of the 2015–16 season, a significant improvement on their previous last place under Jeff Wood (only surviving relegation due to the league's expansion). In April 2016, after the departure of their previous manager, Bado took joint-caretaker charge of the club along with former national team coach David Wilson. While Bado was a candidate for the job on a permanent basis in the summer, Wilson was given the job. However, Wilson resigned from the post in September 2016 after Lions' ownership entered financial difficulties, joining Bruno's Magpies instead, and Rafael Bado was eventually given the job instead. He retired as a player at this time in order to focus on club management. However, in January 2017 he re-registered as a player, making his first appearance off the bench in Lions' 2–0 defeat to Gibraltar Phoenix in the 2017 Rock Cup. He went on to play 3 more games in the season, all as a substitute. He remained a registered player the next season. After leaving the club in the summer, he joined Mons Calpe in July 2018. However, after only 3 games for the Calpeans, on 18 January 2019 he rejoined Lions, starting the game against his former club that same day. He scored his first goal since the 2014–15 season on 23 February 2019, converting a penalty in a 3–1 defeat to St Joseph's. On 28 March 2019, it was announced that Bado had received an 8-month suspension from the Gibraltar Football Association for violating betting rules, effectively ending his spell at Lions. Following his ban, he returned to Spain, playing for UD Castellar.

== International career ==
On 7 September 2014, Bado made his international début for Gibraltar in a UEFA Euro 2016 Group D qualifying match against Poland with Gibraltar losing 7–0.

=== International statistics ===
As of 7 September 2014.

National team	Season	Apps	Goals
Gibraltar	2014	2	0
Total		2	0

== Managerial career ==
Towards the end of the 2015-16 Gibraltar Premier Division season, Bado was appointed interim coach at Lions Gibraltar alongside David Wilson. Although Wilson went on to get the job full-time at the end of the season, he resigned in September 2016, leaving Bado to take control of the club. After a difficult start to the 2016–17 season saw Lions only win one game in 4 months, a number of new signings in January 2017 saw significant improvement and allowed Bado to steer the club clear of relegation, eventually finishing 4 points clear of the relegation playoff in 8th place. Further changes to the squad over the summer saw him lead Lions to an impressive start to the next season, with a victory over reigning champions Europa FC putting them in the race for a position in next season's UEFA Europa League. However, a collapse in form after the winter break dragged the club into a relegation battle, eventually finishing a disappointing 8th and narrowly avoiding the relegation play-off. Bado left his post as manager at the end of the season.

== Managerial statistics ==
As of 4 March 2019

Team	From	To	Record						
Team	From	To	G	W	D	L	GF	GA	Win %
Lions Gibraltar	October 2016	July 2018	57	11	14	32	48	124	19.30

== Personal life ==
Bado works as a storeman in Gibraltar.
