= Esteban Goicoechea =

Argentinian footballer

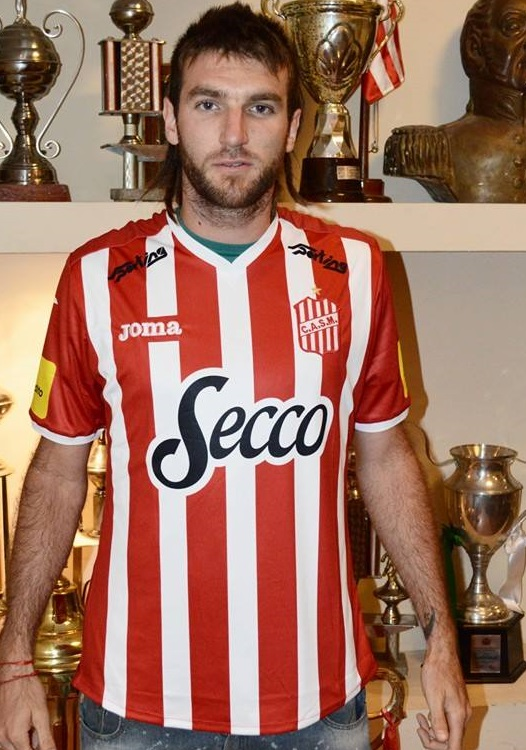
- 2015

Personal information
- Full name: Alberto Esteban Goicoechea
- Date of birth: September 22, 1986 (age 40)
- Place of birth: Rosario, Argentina
- Height: 1.83 m (6 ft 0 in)
- Position: Defender

Team information
- Current team: Glacis United
- Number: 33

Senior career*
Years	Team	Apps	(Gls)
2006–2008	Unión de Santa Fe	9	(0)
2008–2011	Sportivo Belgrano	92	(1)
2011–2012	Defensa y Justicia	6	(0)
2012–2013	San Martín (T)	28	(3)
2013–2014	San Jorge (T)	8	(0)
2014	Sol de América (F)	4	(0)
2015	Juventud Unida	19	(1)
2015–2017	San Martín (T)	52	(3)
2017–2018	Instituto	18	(0)
2018–2019	Sportivo Belgrano	17	(1)
2019	Mons Calpe	9	(0)
2020	Bangor		
2020–2021	Sambenedettese	12	(0)
2021–	Glacis United	14	(2)
- * Club domestic league appearances and goals as of 25 April 2022

Alberto Esteban Goicoechea (born 22 September 1986) is an Argentinean footballer.

== Career ==
Goicochea started his senior career with Unión de Santa Fe in the Argentinean Primera B Nacional, where he made nin league appearances and scored zero goals. After that, he played for Sportivo Belgrano, Defensa y Justicia, San Martín de Tucumán, San Jorge de Tucumán, Sol de América de Formosa, Juventud Unida Universitario, Instituto Atlético Central Córdoba, Mons Calpe S.C., and Bangor City.
