= Mohamed Badr Hassan =

Egyptian-born Gibraltarian footballer (born 1989)

Personal information
- Full name: Mohamed Badr Hassan
- Date of birth: 25 November 1989 (age 36)
- Place of birth: Maadi, Cairo, Egypt
- Height: 1.85 m (6 ft 1 in)
- Position: Midfielder

Team information
- Current team: Glacis United
- Number: 17

Youth career
- 2004–2008: Wadi Degla

Senior career*
Years	Team	Apps	(Gls)
2008–2012	Ittihad El Shorta	–	(–)
2012–2014	Aswan	–	(–)
2014–2020	Lynx	110	(21)
2020–2023	Europa	33	(0)
2021–2022	→ Mons Calpe (loan)	8	(1)
2023–2025	Manchester 62	40	(2)
2025–	Glacis United	10	(0)

International career^{‡}
2019–2023	Gibraltar	16	(0)
- * Club domestic league appearances and goals as of 22:42, 20 December 2025 (UTC) ‡ National team caps and goals as of 22:42, 21 November 2023 (UTC)

Mohamed Badr Hassan (Arabic: محمد بدر حسن; born 25 November 1989) is an Egyptian-born footballer who plays as a midfielder for Glacis United and the Gibraltar national team.

== Career ==
Badr Hassan made his international debut for Gibraltar on 10 October 2019 in a friendly match against Kosovo, which finished as a 0–1 away loss.

On 20 August 2021, Badr Hassan joined Mons Calpe on loan for the first half of the 2021–22 season.

== Personal life ==
Badr Hassan was born in the Cairo district of Maadi. He became a British Overseas Territories citizen in late 2019, after 5 years living in Gibraltar and playing for Lynx.

== Career statistics ==
=== International ===
As of 21 November 2023

Gibraltar
Year	Apps	Goals
2019	4	0
2020	5	0
2021	5	0
2023	2	0
Total	16	0
