= César Vega (footballer) =

Uruguayan footballer (born 1959)

Personal information
- Full name: César Javier Vega Perrone
- Date of birth: September 2, 1959 (age 67)
- Place of birth: Montevideo, Uruguay
- Height: 1.84 m (6 ft 0 in)
- Position: Defender

Team information
- Current team: Mons Calpe (manager)

Senior career*
Years	Team	Apps	(Gls)
1975–1985	Danubio	207	(6)
1985–1987	Progreso	43	(1)
1987–1988	Atlante	36	(1)
1988–1991	Deportivo Mandiyú	101	(2)
1992–?	Central Español	31	(0)

International career
1983–1986	Uruguay	8	(0)

Managerial career
- 2011: Indios de Ciudad Juárez
- Mexico U23
- 2020–: Mons Calpe
- * Club domestic league appearances and goals as of August 2022

César Javier Vega Perrone (born 2 September 1959) is a retired Uruguayan football defender and current manager. Vega received a total of eight international caps (no goals) for the Uruguay national football team. He represented his native country at the 1986 FIFA World Cup, wearing the number 13 jersey. He is currently the manager of Mons Calpe in the Gibraltar National League.

Vega played professional club football for Danubio, Progreso and Central Español in Uruguay, he also played for Atlante in Mexico and Textil Mandiyú in Argentina.

He was named as the head coach of Indios de Ciudad Juárez in Mexico's Liga de Ascenso in July 2011.
