= Massimo Sammartino =

Italian footballer

Personal information
- Date of birth: 8 September 1995 (age 31)
- Place of birth: Rome, Italy
- Height: 1.70 m (5 ft 7 in)
- Position: Defender

Team information
- Current team: Boreale

Youth career
- –2015: Roma

Senior career*
Years	Team	Apps	(Gls)
2015–2017	Roma	0	(0)
2015–2017	→ Pistoiese (loan)	39	(0)
2018–2019	Mosta	28	(1)
2019–2020	Bangor City	15	(1)
2020	Boca Gibraltar	1	(0)
2022	Aprilia	1	(0)
2022–2023	Audace 1919		
2023–	Boreale	5	(0)
- * Club domestic league appearances and goals as of 8 October 2023

Massimo Sammartino (born 8 September 1995) is an Italian footballer who plays as a defender for Serie D side Boreale.

== Club statistics ==
=== Club ===
As of 25 August 2020.

Club	Season	League			National Cup		League Cup		Other		Total	
Club	Season	Division	Apps	Goals	Apps	Goals	Apps	Goals	Apps	Goals	Apps	Goals
Roma	2015–16	Serie A	0	0	0	0	–		0	0	0	0
Roma	2016–17	Serie A	0	0	0	0	–		0	0	0	0
Roma	Total		0	0	0	0	0	0	0	0	0	0
Pistoiese (loan)	2015–16	Serie C	13	0	0	0	1 (Note: Appearances in the Coppa Italia Serie C)	0	0	0	14	0
Pistoiese (loan)	2016–17	Serie C	25	0	0	0	2	0	0	0	27	0
Pistoiese (loan)	Total		38	0	0	0	3	0	0	0	41	0
Mosta	2017–18	Maltese Premier League	8	0	0	0	–		0	0	0	0
Mosta	2018–19	Maltese Premier League	20	1	2 (Note: Appearances in the Maltese FA Trophy)	0	–		0	0	22	1
Mosta	Total		28	1	2	0	0	0	0	0	30	1
Career total			66	1	2	0	3	0	0	0	71	1
