= Abdoul Bandaogo =

Burkinabé footballer

Personal information
- Date of birth: 31 May 1998 (age 28)
- Place of birth: Ouagadougou, Burkina Faso
- Height: 1.92 m (6 ft 4 in)
- Position: Midfielder

Team information
- Current team: Mons Calpe
- Number: 6

Senior career*
Years	Team	Apps	(Gls)
–2019	Racing Club France		
2019–2022	Linense	40	(0)
2020–2021	→ Betis Deportivo (loan)	12	(0)
2022	→ Betis Deportivo (loan)	14	(0)
2022	Trofense	3	(0)
2023	Dinamo Minsk	1	(0)
2023	Celje	0	(0)
2023–2024	Melilla	15	(0)
2025–2026	Cornellà	10	(0)
2026	Socuéllamos	12	(0)
2026–	Mons Calpe	9	(1)

International career^{‡}
2020–2022	Burkina Faso	6	(0)
- * Club domestic league appearances and goals as of 20 November 2026 ‡ National team caps and goals as of 28 September 2022

Abdoul Bandaogo (born 31 May 1998) is a Burkinabé professional footballer who plays as a midfielder for Gibraltar Football League club Mons Calpe.

== International career ==
On 9 October 2020, Bandaogo made his debut for the Burkina Faso national team in a 3–0 friendly win over DR Congo.
