= Andrew Hernandez (footballer) =

Gibraltarian footballer

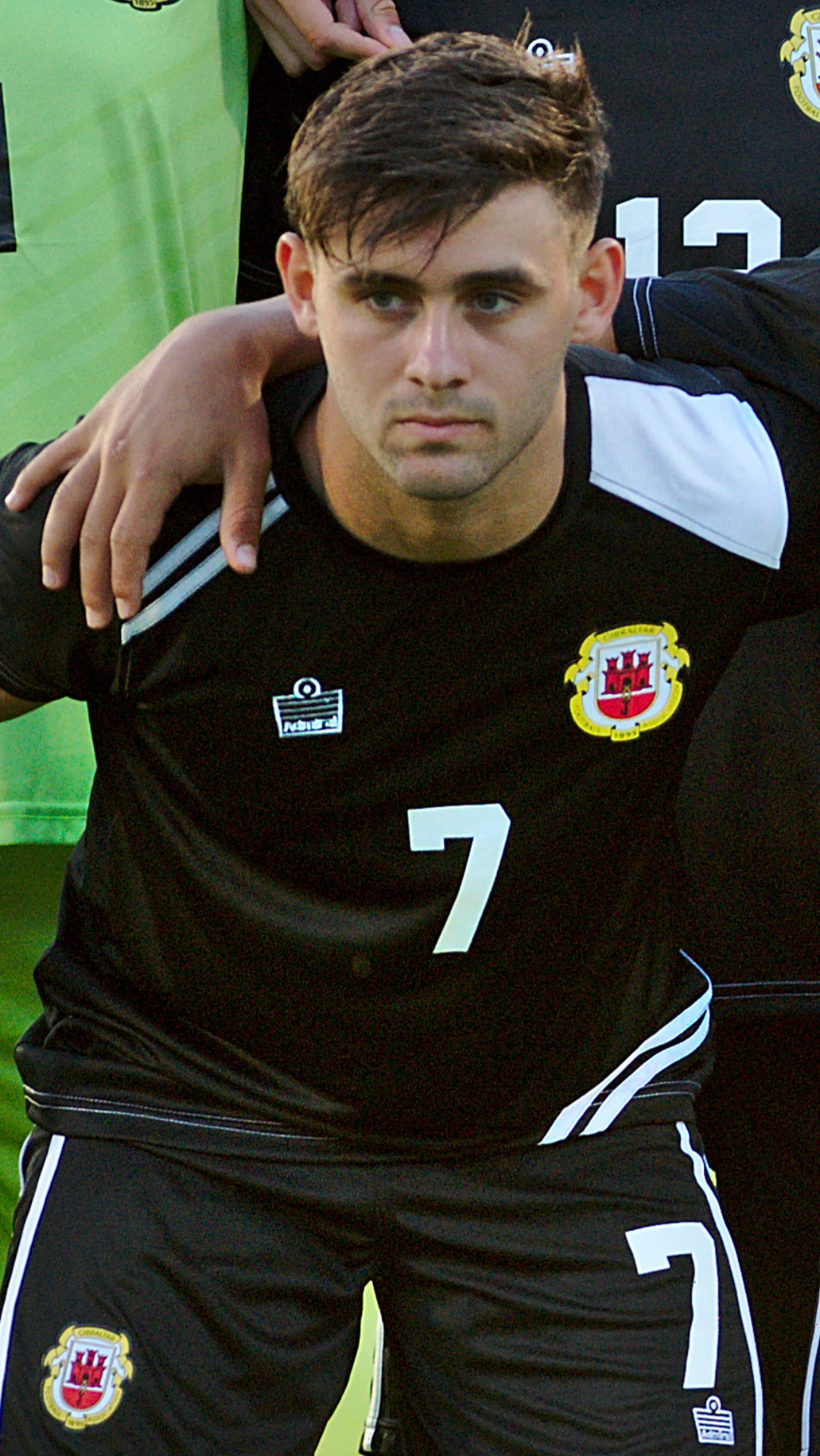

Personal information
- Full name: Andrew Albert Hernandez
- Date of birth: 10 January 1999 (age 27)
- Place of birth: Gibraltar
- Height: 1.74 m (5 ft 8 1/2 in)
- Position: Midfielder

Team information
- Current team: FC Magpies
- Number: 6

Youth career
- –2014: Cádiz CF

Senior career*
| Years | Team | Apps | (Gls) |
| 2014–2016 | Manchester 62 | 19 | (1) |
| 2016–2017 | Gibraltar United | 24 | (1) |
| 2018–2019 | Lincoln Red Imps | 3 | (0) |
| 2019–2022 | St Joseph's | 41 | (0) |
| 2022–2023 | Europa | 20 | (0) |
| 2025 | Lions Gibraltar | 6 | (0) |
| 2025– | FC Magpies | 17 | (2) |

International career^{‡}
| 2013–2014 | Gibraltar U16 | | |
| 2013–2015 | Gibraltar U17 | 9 | (0) |
| 2015–2017 | Gibraltar U19 | 9 | (0) |
| 2017–2020 | Gibraltar U21 | 12 | (0) |
| 2018–2021 | Gibraltar | 11 | (0) |
- * Club domestic league appearances and goals as of 17 January 2026 ‡ National team caps and goals as of 27 March 2021

Andrew Albert Hernandez (born 10 January 1999), also known as Pishu, is a Gibraltarian footballer who plays as a midfielder for FC Magpies and the Gibraltar national team.

== Club career ==
Andrew "Pishu" Hernandez started his career on the books of Cádiz CF in Spain, eventually returning to Gibraltar to play for Manchester 62. While in the Red Devils youth team, he attended a trial at English side Chesterfield in a move orchestrated by fellow Gibraltar side Europa Point.

After starting his senior career at Gibraltar United in 2016 with his brother, he joined Lincoln Red Imps in July 2018. However, he struggled to break into the side, making only 3 league appearances, and he joined rivals St Joseph's on 2 January 2019. He made his debut for the Saints against his old club the next day, coming off the bench in 3-1 win. Pishu scored his first two goals for the club on 6 February 2019, scoring twice before coming off injured in a 12-0 Rock Cup win over Hound Dogs.

== International career ==
Pishu first made international headlines in April 2015, when playing for Gibraltar's under-16 side in a UEFA Development Tournament against Macedonia. After scoring what they believed to be a late winner, Macedonia were caught celebrating inside their own half as Gibraltar restarted. Hernandez scored the controversial decisive goal into an empty net, winning the tournament on goal difference.

After playing for Gibraltar at various age groups from under-17 to under-21 level (being the record caps holder for the under-17s and under-19s as of February 2019), Hernandez made his senior international debut for Gibraltar on 13 October 2018, starting in the 2018–19 UEFA Nations League D match against Armenia before coming off in the 85th minute for Ethan Britto. The match finished as a 1–0 away win for Gibraltar, their first ever competitive victory. At the November match against Macedonia on the road, he impressed the home crowd with his dribbling skills.

== Personal life ==
Hernandez's older brother Anthony is also a footballer, playing with FCB Magpies and the Gibraltar national team.

== Career statistics ==
=== International ===
As of 27 March 2021

Gibraltar
| Year | Apps | Goals |
|---|---|---|
| 2018 | 4 | 0 |
| 2019 | 6 | 0 |
| 2021 | 1 | 0 |
| Total | 11 | 0 |
