= Anthony Hernandez (footballer, born 1995) =

Gibraltarian footballer

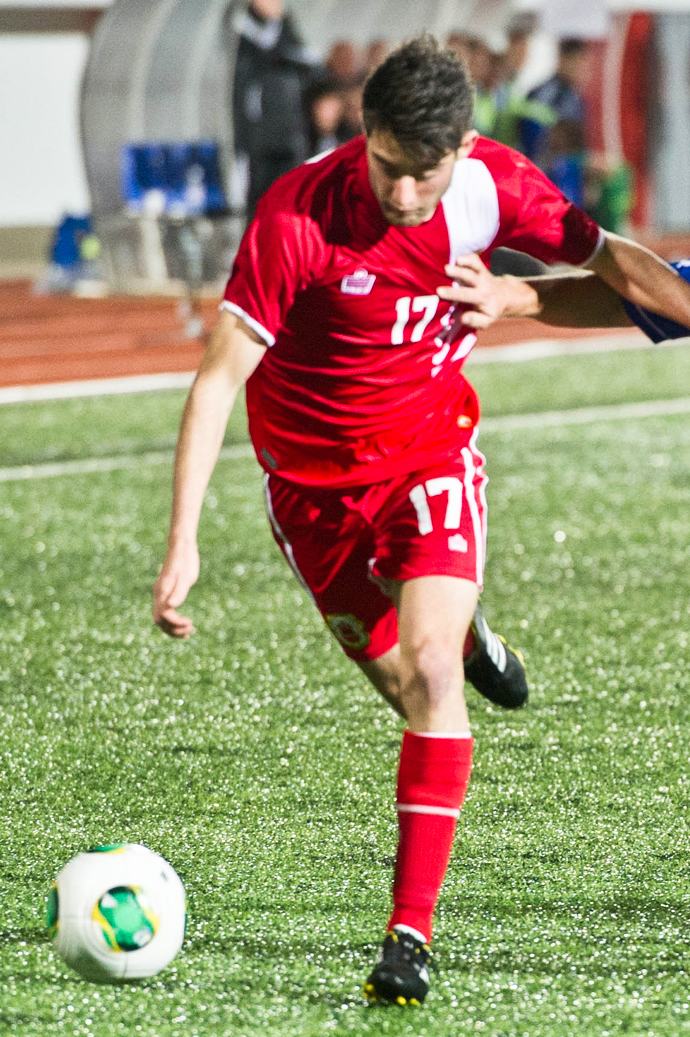

Personal information
- Full name: Anthony Alland Hernandez
- Date of birth: 3 February 1995 (age 31)
- Place of birth: Gibraltar
- Height: 1.82 m (5 ft 11 1/2 in)
- Positions: Forward; winger; attacking midfielder

Team information
- Current team: College 1975
- Number: 18

Youth career
- Cádiz

Senior career*
Years	Team	Apps	(Gls)
2013–2014	Cádiz B	10	(2)
2014–2016	Manchester 62	11	(4)
2016–2017	Gibraltar United	24	(4)
2017–2021	Lincoln Red Imps	50	(16)
2021–2023	Europa	32	(10)
2023–2026	FC Magpies	46	(11)
2026–	College 1975	8	(0)

International career^{‡}
2011	Gibraltar (Non-FIFA)	1	(1)
2013	Gibraltar U19	4	(1)
2015	Gibraltar (Development Squad)	3	(0)
2014–2022	Gibraltar	28	(1)
- * Club domestic league appearances and goals as of 21 November 2026 ‡ National team caps and goals as of 12 June 2022

Anthony Alland Hernandez (born 3 February 1995) is a Gibraltarian footballer who plays as an attacking midfielder for College 1975. He is also a member of the Gibraltar national team. His younger brother, Andrew "Pishu" Hernandez, has also played for the national team.

== International career ==
Hernandez made his international debut for Gibraltar in an unofficial match against the Faroe Islands on 11 March 2011, two years before their first official international match, entering as a substitute and scoring in a 3–0 win, and in doing so at the age of 16 years and 36 days, he became the third youngest goalscorer in the history of European international football, official or otherwise, only behind Samuel Johnston (15 years and 160 days) and József Horváth (16 years and 12 days).

Hernandez was first called up to the official Gibraltar senior team in February 2014 for friendlies against Faroe Islands and Estonia on 1 and 5 March 2014. He made his international début for Gibraltar on 1 March 2014 in a 4–1 home loss against the Faroe Islands as a 71-minute substitute. He was called up to the Gibraltar development squad for the 2015 Island Games in June 2015. He scored his first senior international goal on 9 June 2017 against Cyprus.

=== International goals ===
Score and result list Gibraltar's goal tally first.

#	Date	Venue	Opponent	Score	Result	Competition
1	9 June 2017	Estádio Algarve, Faro, Portugal	Cyprus	1–1	1–2	2018 FIFA World Cup qualification

== Personal life ==
Hernandez's younger brother Andrew is also a footballer, playing with the Gibraltar national team.
