= Michael Yome =

Gibraltarian footballer

Personal information
- Full name: Michael Thomas Yome
- Date of birth: 29 August 1994 (age 32)
- Place of birth: Gibraltar
- Height: 1.80 m (5 ft 11 in)
- Positions: Striker; winger

Team information
- Current team: St Joseph's
- Number: 16

Youth career
- 2002–2005: Gibraltar United
- 2005–2007: Recreativo Linense
- 2007–2011: Atletico Zabal

Senior career*
Years	Team	Apps	(Gls)
2011–2016	Lincoln Red Imps	45	(34)
2016	Manchester 62	10	(2)
2016–2017	Canterbury City	13	(1)
2017–2022	Europa	76	(23)
2022–2025	St Joseph's	46	(9)

International career^{‡}
2014	Gibraltar U19	1	(0)
2015–2016	Gibraltar	9	(0)
- * Club domestic league appearances and goals as of 19 April 2025 ‡ National team caps and goals as of 11 October 2016

Michael Thomas Yome (born 29 August 1994) is a retired Gibraltarian footballer who last played for St Joseph's and the Gibraltar national team.

== Career ==
Yome began his career as a youth player at Gibraltar United, before moving across the border to play for Recreativo Linense and Atletico Zabal. He later returned to Gibraltar signing with the Premier Division reigning champions, Lincoln Red Imps and remained at the club until January 2016, when he signed for Manchester 62 for the remainder of the campaign. Internationally, Yome has 7 caps for the Gibraltar National Team.

Yome moved to the UK to study teaching at Canterbury Christ Church University, and joined Canterbury City for the duration of his course. He scored on his debut for the club in their Kent Senior Trophy tie against Meridian in a 6–0 victory. At the end of the season, Yome scored once in 13 appearances to help City to a 9th place finish in the 2016–17 Southern Counties East Football League.

In August 2017, he entered talks with reigning Gibraltar Premier Division champions Europa, after leaving Canterbury City. His signing was confirmed by the club on 16 August 2017. After 5 years at the club, he was released in July 2022. He subsequently joined St Joseph's in August 2022.

== International career ==
Yome made his international debut on 4 September 2015 against the Republic of Ireland in the Euro 2016 qualifiers.

== Honours ==
With Lincoln

- Gibraltar League: 2014–15, 2015–16
- Rock Cup: 2016
- Pepe Reyes Cup: 2015

With Europa

- Rock Cup: 2017–18, 2019
- Pepe Reyes Cup: 2018
