= Emil Peter Jørgensen =

Danish footballer (born 1995)

Emil Jørgensen
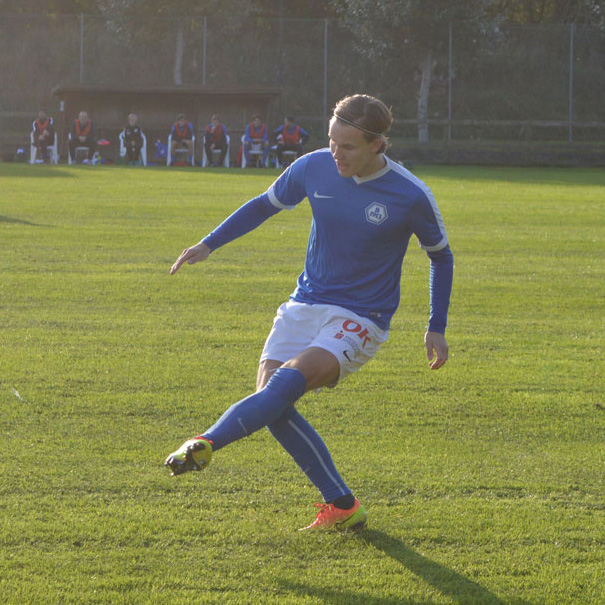

Personal information
- Full name: Emil Peter Jørgensen
- Date of birth: 14 November 1995 (age 30)
- Place of birth: Denmark
- Height: 1.86 m (6 ft 1 in)
- Position: Centre-back

Team information
- Current team: B 1913

Youth career
- Nr. Lyndelse - Søby FC
- OB

Senior career*
Years	Team	Apps	(Gls)
2013–2015	OB	1	(0)
2014	→ FC Roskilde (loan)	0	(0)
2015–2016	FC Fredericia	15	(0)
2016–2017	Omonia	0	(0)
2017	BK Marienlyst	10	(1)
2017	B 1913	1	(0)
2018	BK Frem	14	(0)
2018	Vereya	15	(0)
2019	Europa	6	(0)
2019–	B 1913		

International career^{‡}
2010–2011	Denmark U16	7	(0)
2012–2012	Denmark U17	4	(2)
2012–2013	Denmark U18	5	(0)
2013–2014	Denmark U19	14	(0)
2013	Denmark U20	2	(0)
- * Club domestic league appearances and goals as of 18 May 2019 ‡ National team caps and goals as of 31 January 2019

Emil Peter Jørgensen (born 14 November 1995) is a Danish footballer who plays as a centre-back for B 1913.

== Career ==
=== Move to Europa F.C. ===
On 30 January 2019, Jørgensen joined Europa F.C. from Gibraltar Premier Division side until the end of the season.

=== Return to B1913 ===
In September 2019, it was confirmed that Jørgensen had returned to his former club B 1913.
