= Evan Green (footballer) =

English-born Gibraltarian footballer

Personal information
- Full name: Evan James Green
- Date of birth: 13 March 1993 (age 33)
- Place of birth: Eastbourne, England
- Positions: Midfielder; forward

Team information
- Current team: Lions Gibraltar
- Number: 3

Senior career*
Years	Team	Apps	(Gls)
2012–2016	Lions Gibraltar		
2016	→ Gibraltar United (loan)	9	(3)
2016–2017	Gibraltar United	17	(0)
2017	Kingstonian	0	(0)
2017–2018	Chertsey Town	4	(0)
2018–2020	St Joseph's	12	(1)
2019–2020	→ Boca Gibraltar (loan)	5	(0)
2021–	Lions Gibraltar	34	(4)

International career^{‡}
2015	Gibraltar development squad	3	(0)
2017	Gibraltar	1	(0)
- * Club domestic league appearances and goals as of 13 April 2024 (UTC) ‡ National team caps and goals as of 3 September 2017 (UTC)

Evan James Green (born 13 March 1993) is an English-born Gibraltarian association footballer who currently plays for Lions Gibraltar, and the Gibraltar national football team.

== Club career ==
Until 2016, Green played for Lions Gibraltar in the Gibraltar Premier Division, before spending the second half of the 2015–16 season on loan at Gibraltar United. At the end of the season, he made the transfer permanent as he played 17 times, helping Gibraltar United to stay up. However, he was deemed surplus to requirements at the club once they were taken over by a consortium led by Pablo Dana and Míchel Salgado, catching the attention of Kingstonian during their pre-season tour of Gibraltar, and scoring in a 2–1 victory for Kingstonian against Lynx.

His performances led to him being signed by the English club for the coming season. After spending the majority of his early time at the club on the bench, Green finally made his debut for Kingstonian on 31 October 2017, as a substitute in their FA Trophy replay win over Thurrock. However, that was the only competitive appearance he made for the team; following a change in manager, the club released Green in early November. Later that month, he dropped two levels to join Chertsey Town in the Combined Counties League, making his debut in a Southern Combination Cup game against Ash United on 14 November 2017.

In January 2018 he left Chertsey to return to Gibraltar with St Joseph's. Registration rules meant that he had to wait until 31 March for his debut, coming on as a substitute in the club's 3–1 win against Lynx. He scored his first goal for the club the next season, in a 7–1 victory over Lynx on 11 December 2018. In August 2019 he moved on loan to Boca Gibraltar for the duration of the 2019–20 season.

== International career ==
Green first received a call-up to the Gibraltar national football team in 2016, having previously played for a development side at the 2015 Island Games, but he did not play until September 3, 2017, when he was named in the starting lineup for their match against Bosnia and Herzegovina.
