= Jesús Ayala =

Spanish footballer

Personal information
- Full name: Jesús María Ayala Sánchez
- Date of birth: 16 November 1993 (age 33)
- Place of birth: Algeciras, Spain
- Height: 1.76 m (5 ft 9 in)
- Position: Winger

Team information
- Current team: Mons Calpe
- Number: 7

Youth career
- Monitores Algeciras
- 2005–2007: Algeciras
- 2007–2009: Salesianos Algeciras
- 2009–2011: AD Taraguilla
- 2011–2012: Recreativo

Senior career*
Years	Team	Apps	(Gls)
2012–2015	Recreativo B	69	(8)
2012–2014	Recreativo	2	(0)
2013–2014	→ Algeciras (loan)	21	(0)
2015–2016	San Roque	20	(5)
2016	Vilafranca	15	(1)
2016–2019	Algeciras	76	(11)
2019	Los Barrios	10	(0)
2019–2021	San Roque	33	(6)
2021–2023	Guadiaro	28	(4)
2023–	Mons Calpe	75	(17)
- * Club domestic league appearances and goals as of 20 November 2026

Jesús María Ayala Sánchez (born 16 November 1993) is a Spanish footballer who plays for Mons Calpe as a left winger.

== Club career ==
Born in Algeciras, Province of Cádiz, Ayala graduated from Recreativo de Huelva's youth system, making his senior debuts with the reserves in the 2011–12 season, in Tercera División. On 14 October 2012 he made his professional debut with the Andalusians, playing the last four minutes in a 2–5 away loss against Girona FC in the Segunda División.

On 21 June 2013 Ayala was loaned to Algeciras CF of the Segunda División B.
