= Aaron Edwards (football) =

Gibraltarian footballer

Personal information
- Date of birth: 1979 (age 46–47)
- Place of birth: Gibraltar

Managerial career
- Years: Team
- 2010–2017: Gibraltar (Assistant)
- 2020: Boca Gibraltar

Aaron Edwards (born 1979) is a Gibraltarian football manager, and current vice-chairman of Bruno's Magpies, having formerly served as co-owner of Boca Gibraltar. Since 2010, he has been the assistant manager of the Gibraltar national football team under head coach Allen Bula and held the position when the Gibraltar Football Association (GFA) was admitted to UEFA in May 2013. In March 2013, Edwards successfully passed his FA Coaching Level 2 course, part of the requirements for obtaining an UEFA B licence. Additionally, he serves as Head of Analysis and Player Performance for the GFA.

Edwards has also served as a committee member for the GFA council.
