= Ibrahim Ayew =

Ghanaian footballer (born 1988)

Personal information
- Full name: Ibrahim Abdul Rahim Ayew
- Date of birth: 16 April 1988 (age 38)
- Place of birth: Tamale, Ghana
- Height: 1.78 m (5 ft 10 in)
- Position: Defensive midfielder

Team information
- Current team: Glacis United (player-coach)
- Number: 21

Youth career
- Adisadel College
- Nania

Senior career*
Years	Team	Apps	(Gls)
2005–2008	Nania	77	(13)
2008–2009	Eleven Wise	30	(6)
2009–2010	Zamalek	11	(1)
2011–2013	Lierse	39	(0)
2013–2015	Asante Kotoko	11	(0)
2016–2021	Europa	83	(4)
2022–2023	Bruno's Magpies	18	(0)
2023–2026	Lincoln Red Imps	39	(0)
2026–	Glacis United	1	(0)

International career
- Ghana U-17
- Ghana U-20
- Ghana U-23
2009–2010	Ghana	8	(0)
- * Club domestic league appearances and goals as of 21 November 2026

Ibrahim Abdul Rahim Ayew (born 16 April 1988), also known as Ibrahim Ayew or Rahim Ayew, is a Ghanaian professional footballer who plays as a defensive midfielder for Glacis United.

== Club career ==
Ayew began to play football at Adisadel College, and later started his professional career with his father's team F.C. Nania and was in January 2009 transferred to Eleven Wise. He agreed to sign for German club TSG Hoffenheim, signing on a three-and-a-half-year contract, but the deal never materialized. On 17 June 2009, after much speculation, then 21-year-old Ghanaian national player joined from Sekondi Wise Fighters to Egyptian giants El Zamalek FC, where he signed a five-year contract. In January 2011, he signed a contract with Lierse S.K. in the Jupiler League in Belgium. He became a free agent in July 2013 after a two-season stint with Lierse and then for 5 months, he tried to look for a team to play. In December 2013, he returned to Ghana, signing with Asante Kotoko. In 2016, Ayew moved to Gibraltar to sign with Premier Division side Europa. Used as a left-back in the side, he scored his first goal on 19 March 2017 against Europa Point. After 5 years at the club, Ayew left Europa in summer 2021. However, he returned to football a year later to sign for league rivals Bruno's Magpies, first appearing in their inaugural UEFA Europa Conference League squad to face Crusaders on 7 July 2022. A year later, he joined Lincoln Red Imps, spending 3 years with the perennial champions. In November 2026 he joined Glacis United as player-coach.

== International career ==
Ayew has played for Ghana at the U-17, U-20, U-23 and the Senior Team levels. He was also called up for the friendly game of the Ghana national football team against Mali national football team and played the game alongside his younger brother André Ayew. He played in the 2010 African cup of nations in Angola and placed 2nd in the tournament. He also featured in the CAF African Nations Cup Tournament (CHAN) and placed 2nd again in that tournament with Rahim voted twice as Man of the match in 2009. He was selected, together with his brother André Ayew as part of Ghana's 23-man team for the 2010 World Cup staged in South Africa.

== Personal life ==
Ayew comes from a family of footballers. He is the half brother of André, Jordan and Imani, having the same father, Ghana's renowned ex captain Abédi Pelé. Abedi and his first wife had Rahim, before Abedi married Maha, mother of Abedi's other children. Rahim is the nephew of Sola Ayew and Ghana's retired ex striker Kwame Ayew.

== Honours ==
Nania

- E. K. Nayanar Memorial Football Gold Cup: 2007

Asante Kotoko

- Ghana Premier League: 2013–14
- Ghana FA Cup: 2013–14
- Ghana Super Cup: 2014

Europa

- Gibraltar Premier Division: 2016–17
- Rock Cup: 2017, 2017–18, 2019

Lincoln Red Imps

- Gibraltar Football League: 2023–24, 2024–25
- Rock Cup: 2023–24
- Pepe Reyes Cup: 2025
