= Alfonso Cortijo =

Spanish footballer and manager

Personal information
- Full name: Alfonso Cortijo Cabrera
- Date of birth: 14 September 1966 (age 60)
- Place of birth: Jerez de la Frontera, Spain
- Height: 1.79 m (5 ft 10 in)
- Position: Left back

Team information
- Current team: Mons Calpe (manager)

Youth career
- Cádiz

Senior career*
| Years | Team | Apps | (Gls) |
| 1984–1987 | Cádiz B | | |
| 1984–1991 | Cádiz | 121 | (8) |
| 1991–1995 | Sevilla | 102 | (4) |
| 1995–1998 | Rayo Vallecano | 52 | (2) |
| 1998–1999 | Numancia | 40 | (0) |
| 1999–2002 | Cádiz | 79 | (1) |
| Total | | 394 | (15) |

International career
- Andalusia

Managerial career
- 2002–2004: Cádiz (assistant)
- 2004–2005: Albacete (assistant)
- 2005: Florida (youth)
- 2005–2006: Bornense
- 2006–2007: Cádiz (assistant)
- 2009: Arcos
- 2009–2010: Murcia (assistant)
- 2010–2012: Cádiz (assistant)
- 2012–2013: Rivera
- 2013–2014: Balón de Cádiz
- 2014–2016: St Joseph's
- 2017: Beijing Guoan (assistant)
- 2018: Málaga (assistant)
- 2018: Glacis United
- 2019–2020: Bruno's Magpies
- 2021–2022: Dalian Professional (assistant)
- 2023: Bruno's Magpies
- 2024–2026: Chiclana
- 2026–: Mons Calpe
- * Club domestic league appearances and goals

Alfonso Cortijo Cabrera (born 14 September 1966) is a Spanish football manager and former footballer who played as a left back. He is the current manager of Gibraltarian club Mons Calpe.

== Club career ==
Cortijo started his career with Spanish side Cádiz.

== International career ==
Cortijo played for the Andalusia autonomous football team.

== Managerial career ==
After retiring from playing professional football, Cortijo worked as a football manager.
