= Urko Arroyo =

Spanish footballer

Personal information
- Full name: Urko Arroyo Rivas
- Date of birth: 14 May 1987 (age 39)
- Place of birth: Bilbao, Spain
- Height: 1.70 m (5 ft 7 in)
- Position: Winger

Team information
- Current team: Ciudad de Torredonjimeno

Youth career
- 1999–2005: Athletic Bilbao

Senior career*
Years	Team	Apps	(Gls)
2005–2006	Basconia	21	(7)
2005–2008	Bilbao Athletic	93	(14)
2006–2009	Athletic Bilbao	2	(0)
2009	→ Atlético Baleares (loan)	11	(0)
2009–2011	Barakaldo	54	(9)
2011–2012	San Roque	24	(4)
2012–2013	Amorebieta	23	(4)
2013–2014	Toledo	33	(6)
2014–2015	Jaén	14	(1)
2015–2016	Lleida Esportiu	30	(2)
2016–2017	Lorca	35	(6)
2017–2018	UCAM Murcia	32	(1)
2018–2019	Europa	21	(12)
2020–2022	Atlético Mancha Real	62	(21)
2022–2023	Real Jaén	30	(6)
2023–	Ciudad de Torredonjimeno	35	(5)
- * Club domestic league appearances and goals as of 13 October 2024

Urko Arroyo Rivas (born 14 May 1987) is a Spanish footballer who plays for Ciudad de Torredonjimeno as a right winger.

== Club career ==
Arroyo was born in Bilbao, Biscay. After passing through the various youth ranks at local Athletic Bilbao, he would make two appearances with the first team: the first arrived on 23 April 2006, as he played five minutes in a 0–3 home loss against Valencia CF. The other only came two years later, also in La Liga, in a 4–1 away defeat to Sevilla FC.

Released by Athletic in the summer of 2009, Arroyo joined Basque neighbours Barakaldo CF in the third division. He continued competing in that tier the following years, in representation of a host of clubs.

Arroyo moved abroad for the first time in 2018, with the 31-year-old signing for Europa from the Gibraltar Premier Division.
