= Luke Wall =

English footballer

Personal information
- Full name: Luke Sky Wall
- Date of birth: 11 November 1996 (age 30)
- Place of birth: Liverpool, England
- Height: 1.80 m (5 ft 11 in)
- Positions: Midfielder; forward

Team information
- Current team: Runcorn Linnets

Youth career
- –2015: Blackburn Rovers

Senior career*
Years	Team	Apps	(Gls)
2015–2016	Blackburn Rovers	0	(0)
2015	→ Skelmersdale United (loan)	–	(–)
2016–2017	Accrington Stanley	0	(0)
2016	→ Skelmersdale United (loan)	–	(–)
2017	→ Clitheroe (loan)	5	(2)
2017	→ Marine (loan)	1	(0)
2017–2018	Bangor City	30	(5)
2018	Stalybridge Celtic	3	(0)
2018–2019	Curzon Ashton	24	(5)
2019	Witton Albion	5	(0)
2019–2020	Altrincham	9	(0)
2020	Warrington Town	3	(0)
2020	Boca Gibraltar	5	(4)
2021	Lincoln Red Imps	6	(1)
2021	Warrington Rylands	14	(2)
2021–2022	Widnes	?	(?)
2022–2024	Bala Town	47	(6)
2024–	Runcorn Linnets	0	(0)
- * Club domestic league appearances and goals as of 29 May 2024

Luke Sky Wall (born 11 November 1996) is an English professional footballer who plays as a forward for Northern Premier League Division One West club Runcorn Linnets.

== Career ==
Wall was born in Liverpool and started his career with Blackburn Rovers as a youth player joining at under-14 level. In the summer of 2015 he signed his first professional contract after completing his scholarship with the academy. In November 2015, he joined Northern Premier League Premier Division side Skelmersdale United on a one-month youth loan. In the summer of 2016 he was released by Blackburn and joined League Two side Accrington Stanley on a one-year contract following a trial. He was recommended to the club by former Blackburn teammate and Accrington player John O'Sullivan. He made his first team debut for the club in August 2016 as a second-half substitute for Sean McConville in the 3–0 defeat to Crewe Alexandra in an EFL Trophy group-stage match. After struggling to break through into the match-day squad, he returned to Skelmersdale for a second loan spell in September 2016. In February 2017, he was sent out on loan again, joining Northern Premier League Division One North side Clitheroe on a short-term deal. He made a total of seven appearances in all competitions during the loan spell, scoring twice in a 4–3 away win over Ramsbottom United. In March 2017, he was on the move again joining Northern Premier League Premier Division side Marine on loan until the end of the season.

He then joined Welsh Premier League side Bangor City. In July 2018 he joined Stalybridge Celtic. He left the club in October 2018. He then played for Curzon Ashton.

In early October 2019 he joined Witton Albion before he moved at the end of the month to Altrincham. In February 2020 he joined Warrington Town. After a brief spell at the club, he moved to Gibraltar in June that year to sign for Boca Gibraltar. After scoring a penalty on his debut against St Joseph's on 18 October, he secured his first career hat-trick the following week in a 6-1 win over College 1975. However, on- and off- the field problems saw Boca expelled in December 2020. In February 2021, he joined league rivals Lincoln Red Imps. In August 2021 he signed for Warrington Rylands. In November he left the club to sign for Widnes.

In June 2022 he signed for Cymru Premier club Bala Town.

On 26 May 2024, Wall joined Runcorn Linnets.

== Career statistics ==
As of match played on 18 March 2017

Appearances and goals by club, season and competition
Club	Season	League			FA Cup		League Cup		Other		Total	
Club	Season	Division	Apps	Goals	Apps	Goals	Apps	Goals	Apps	Goals	Apps	Goals
Blackburn Rovers	2015–16	Championship	0	0	0	0	0	0	—		0	0
Accrington Stanley	2016–17	League Two	0	0	0	0	0	0	1 (Note: Appearance in EFL Trophy)	0	1	0
Clitheroe (loan)	2015–16	NPL Division One North	5	2	—		—		2 (Note: Appearances in Northern Premier League Challenge Cup)	0	7	2
Marine (loan)	2016–17	NPL Premier Division	1	0	—		—		—		1	0
Career total			6	2	0	0	0	0	3	0	9	2

== Honours ==
- Welsh Premier League Team of the Year: 2017–18
