= F.C. Boca Gibraltar =

Association football club in Gibraltar

Boca Gibraltar
- Full name: Football Club Boca Juniors Gibraltar
- Nickname: Boca
- Founded: 2012
- Dissolved: 2020
- Ground: Victoria Stadium, Gibraltar
- Capacity: 2,300
Home colours	Away colours

Boca Gibraltar was a football team from Gibraltar. They played in the Gibraltar National League until 2020, having previously played in the Gibraltar Premier Division and the Gibraltar Second Division and they also played in the Rock Cup.

== History ==
The club was founded as Boca Juniors Gibraltar F.C. in 2012, and joined the Gibraltar Second Division for the 2012–13 season. After the Gibraltar Football Association joined UEFA in 2013, the league saw significant expansion and an influx of foreign players, however, a 10th-place finish in the 14-team league was all they could muster in the 2014–15 season. After rebuilding the squad in the now 12-team division, the team finished 8th in the 2015–16 season.

Significant improvements after the departure of Red Imps, Pegasus and Britannia from the league saw an impressive 3rd-place finish in 2017, while the club began referring to themselves as simply Boca Gibraltar. However, 7 points separated Boca from the top two teams, and they missed out on the promotion play-off. A restructuring in summer 2017 saw former goalkeeper and club captain Philip Hermida promoted to Director of Football, with the intention of challenging for promotion in 2018. A 1–1 draw with Ocean Village rivals Bruno's Magpies on the final day secured the Second Division title by a single point on 22 May 2018, ensuring that Boca would play in the Gibraltar Premier Division for the first time the next season.

In February 2019 with the club on the brink of folding, the club was taken over by a group of investors including former player Phillip Hermida, Allen Bula Jr, and former national team coach Aaron Edwards. Though this new consortium managed to keep the team afloat, the team continued to struggle. Potential investment never materialised during the abandoned 2019–20 season, however a rebuild of the squad in summer 2020 began, with new manager Stephen Vaughan Jr. bringing in an influx of British and Italian players to strengthen the side. However, the sponsorship was withdrawn in August, with Vaughan stepping away from the football club to concentrate on his sports management company. Under Edwards, the team started the season brightly, however after incurring 2 forfeits due to Home Grown Player rule violations, the club was refused domestic licence which resulted in the team expelled from the league on 9 December 2020. However, a team operating under the name Boca Juniors Gibraltar entered the 2021 Gibraltar Futsal Second Division, indicating that there is a new phoenix club that exists without ownership.

== Final squad ==
Correct as of 9 December 2020.

Note: Flags indicate national team as defined under FIFA eligibility rules; some limited exceptions apply. Players may hold more than one non-FIFA nationality.

No.	Pos.	Nation	Player
1	GK	WAL	Jack Atkinson
2	DF	GIB	Ethan Thorne-Llambias (on loan from Lincoln Red Imps)
3	MF	GIB	Sean Gilbert
4	DF	ESP	Guillermo Pérez
5	MF	GIB	James Parkinson
6	MF	GIB	Max Cottrell
7	FW	ENG	Luke Wall
8	MF	BRA	Matheus Motta
9	FW	GIB	Lython Marquez
10	FW	GIB	Dylan Peacock
11	MF	GIB	Leon Clinton
12	DF	ESP	Oscar Moreno

No.	Pos.	Nation	Player
14	FW	GIB	Nathan Santos
15	DF	GIB	Lee Coombes
16	DF	ENG	Lennie Armstrong (captain)
18	DF	GIB	Elias Juel-Saleh
19	MF	SCO	Cavan Burns
20	DF	ITA	Massimo Sammartino
21	DF	ITA	Alberto Drudi (on loan from Chievo)
23	MF	ITA	Mattia Ramundo
25	GK	ENG	Kieren Proctor
26	DF	ITA	Daniele Grieco (on loan from Chievo)
27	MF	ITA	Hassen Haddad

== Club staff ==
According to the club's website.

Position	Name
Club Management
Chairman-Manager	(Gibraltar) Aaron Edwards
Assistant Manager	(England) Luke Purcell
Fitness Coach	(Spain) Jesus Gallardo
Physio	(Gibraltar) Gavin Vinales
