= Mons Calpe S.C. =

Sports club in Gibraltar

Mons Calpe
- Full name: Mons Calpe Sports Club
- Nickname: The Calpeans
- Founded: 2013; 13 years ago
- Ground: Victoria Stadium, Gibraltar
- Capacity: 2,000
- Owner: Reygadas Sports Group
- Manager: Alfonso Cortijo
- League: Gibraltar Football League
- 2025–26: GFL, 4th
- Website: https://vamons.com/
Home colours	Away colours

Mons Calpe S.C. is a professional sporting club in Gibraltar. Founded in 2013, the club's football section competes in the Gibraltar Football League. Mons Calpe also has a U-23 squad, futsal teams and darts.

== History ==
Mons Calpe S.C. was formed by Kieran Alman, James Read, Phillip Debono, Richard Lavagna and Adrian Ballestero in 2013 after Gibraltar's admittance into UEFA sparked a boom in interest in football on the Rock. After an impressive maiden season in the 2013–14 Gibraltar Second Division, the club finished second in the league. However, the club succumbed to a 2–0 defeat to St Joseph's in the promotion/relegation playoff that year. The following season saw the club struggle to emulate the same form, against much stronger promotion contenders, which saw the club lingering in mid-table for much of the season and eventually finishing 8th.

After a significant rebuild over the summer of 2015, Mons Calpe had a second chance at promotion through the end-of-season playoff against Premier Division side FC Britannia. A victory in that game saw the young club seal their first-ever season in the top-flight of Gibraltarian football.

The summer after gaining promotion, Mons Calpe's football structure went through a total reconstruction to further professionalise the club, highlighted by a majority-share investment by a US-based group led by Jose Alfredo Reygadas. The Calpeans then appointed Brazilian/Portuguese coach William Amaral de Andrade as first team head coach and former Gibraltar U19 Manager Terrence Jolley as his assistant manager for the 2016–17 season. After a bad run of form in winter saw them slip from 3rd to 5th, William was sacked on 16 January and replaced by Jolley on an interim basis. On 17 March, Italian manager Mauro Ardizzone was appointed head coach, with Jolley returning to his role as assistant. Ardizzone eventually saw the Calpeans to a 5th-place finish in their maiden Premier Division season, including a notable 2–2 draw with Lincoln Red Imps in the penultimate round.

At the start of the 2017–18 season, the Calpeans named Albert Ferri as their new manager. However, poor results led to his dismissal in December 2017, and renowned Argentinean manager Luis Manuel Blanco replaced him as first team head coach. After Blanco's arrival, the club won 14 of their next 22 matches in all competitions, finishing with a club-high 44 points in the top-flight and reaching the Rock Cup final, losing 2–1 to Europa.

The 2018–19 season started slowly, but Mons Calpe put together a serious challenge for a European spot, putting together the best season in its short history in the Premier Division. The club ended with its highest point total (49) and best position in the league table (4th), only 6 points behind St. Joe's for the last UEFA Europa League berth, despite beating the Saints twice and drawing once in their 3 regular season match-ups. The Calpeans also made a deep run in the Rock Cup, beating St. Joseph's again 4–1 in the quarterfinal, but falling short of a second consecutive Cup final after losing 1–0 to Gibraltar United in the semifinal. Manager Blanco left his role at the club on 28 May 2019.

In the 2020–21 season, Mons Calpe qualified for European competition for the first time. In 2022, the club also established a farm team in the fourth tier Liga TDP in Mexico, with Mons Calpe S.C. Yucatán entering the league.

In 2023, Mons Calpe entered into an agreement with Gibraltar Wave which would make Gibraltar Wave the affiliate women's team of the Calpeans.

=== Seasons ===
Season	Division	League record								Rock Cup	Europe	
Season	Division	P	W	D	L	GF	GA	Pts	Pos	Rock Cup	Competition	Result
2013–14	Second	22	13	3	6	50	29	42	2nd (Note: Lost in the Promotion/relegation play-off 2–0 to St Joseph's.)	First round	Did not qualify	
2014–15	Second	26	10	3	13	62	63	33	8th	First round	Did not qualify	
2015–16	Second	22	17	2	3	82	12	53	2nd (Note: Promoted via the Promotion/relegation play-off beating Britannia XI 2–1.)	Second round	Did not qualify	
2016–17	Premier	27	13	3	11	44	35	42	5th	Second round	Did not qualify	
2017–18	Premier	27	14	2	11	48	35	44	5th	Runners-up	Did not qualify	
2018–19	Premier	27	15	4	8	63	29	49	4th	Semi-final	Did not qualify	
2019–20	National	18	10	3	5	49	29	33	7th (Note: The 2019–20 Gibraltar National League season, and the 2020 Rock Cup, were abandoned with results declared null and void and results expunged due to the COVID-19 pandemic.)	Abandoned	Did not qualify	
2020–21	National	20	10	2	8	36	35	32	4th	Quarter-final	Did not qualify	
2021–22	National	20	6	2	12	34	36	20	6th	Quarter-final	Europa Conference League	First qualifying round
2022–23	GFL	18	9	1	8	26	26	28	7th	Semi-final	Did not qualify	
2023–24	GFL	25	9	6	10	37	39	33	5th	Quarter-final	Did not qualify	
2024–25	GFL	20	4	1	15	23	54	13	10th	Quarter-final	Did not qualify	

== European record ==
As of match played 15 July 2021

Season	Competition	Round	Club	Home	Away	Agg.
2021–22	UEFA Europa Conference League	1QR	(Andorra) FC Santa Coloma	1–1	0–4	1–5

Notes

- QR: Qualifying round

== Current squad ==
As of 20 June 2026

=== First Team squad ===
Note: Flags indicate national team as defined under FIFA eligibility rules; some limited exceptions apply. Players may hold more than one non-FIFA nationality.

No.	Pos.	Nation	Player
1	GK	POL	Oli Oleksiewicz
2	DF	ESP	Nacho Holgado
3	DF	ESP	Pablo Cortijo
4	DF	GIB	Ethan Llambias (vice-captain)
5	DF	GIB	Jayvan Garro
6	MF	BFA	Abdoul Bandaogo
7	FW	ESP	Jesús Ayala (captain)
8	MF	GIB	Jayce Consigliero
9	FW	ESP	Diego Doblado
10	MF	ESP	Diego Díaz
11	FW	ESP	Ranchero
12	FW	GIB	Adam Gracia

No.	Pos.	Nation	Player
14	DF	ESP	Cheito
15	MF	MEX	Mauricio Reygadas
16	MF	ESP	Antonio Sánchez
17	FW	ARG	Alan Picazzo
19	FW	GIB	Dylan Borge
20	FW	ESP	Juanje
21	MF	GIB	Angelo Parody
22	MF	ESP	Miguel Ortiz
23	GK	GIB	Tom Chakraverty
24	MF	GIB	Karim Bousselham
31	MF	ESP	Fernando Cosano
61	DF	MAR	Ayoub Jarfi

== Club staff ==
Position	Name
Club Management
Head coach	(Spain) Alfonso Cortijo
Assistant Coach	(Spain) Dani Caravaca
Goalkeeper Coach	(Argentina) Christian Fraiz
Physical Trainer	(Spain) Javi Jiménez
Physio	(Gibraltar) Ethan Dobinson
Analyst	(Spain) Dani Quiñones
Board
Chairman	(Mexico) José Reygadas
