= 2021–22 Women's Rock Cup =

Women's football tournament season

Tournament details
- Country: Gibraltar
- Dates: 29 October – 6 December 2021
- Teams: 5

Final positions
- Champions: Lions Gibraltar (2nd title)
- Runners-up: Lynx

Tournament statistics
- Matches played: 4
- Goals scored: 33 (8.25 per match)
- Top goal scorer: Mollie Karp (11 goals)

The 2021–22 Women's Rock Cup is a single-leg knockout tournament contested by clubs from Gibraltar, with five clubs participating (the first time since 2016). It is the 8th edition of the tournament since the Gibraltar Football Association joined UEFA in 2013.

The last pre-COVID edition of the tournament was held in 2019, with Lions Gibraltar winning their first title. The Women's Rock Cup was not held in 2020 or 2021 due to the COVID-19 pandemic.

== First round ==
The tournament kicked off on 29 October 2021 with a preliminary round between Lions Gibraltar and Manchester 62.

29 October 2021	Lions Gibraltar	14–0	Manchester 62	Gibraltar
18:30	J. Gilbert 3', 14', 63'; Karp 10', 19', 21', 27', 51', 59', 61', 65', 76'; Alvez 37'; T. Gilbert 74'	Report		Stadium: Victoria Stadium

== Semi-finals ==
The semi-finals were played on 7 November 2021.

7 November 2021	Lynx	5–0	Gibraltar Wave	Gibraltar
16:00	Orfila 48', 71', 90+7'; N. Laguea 85', 90+3'	Report		Stadium: Victoria Stadium

7 November 2021	Lions Gibraltar	8–0	Europa	Gibraltar
18:30	J. Gilbert 36', 46'; Mascarenhas-Olivero 49', 68'; Alvez 58', 70'; Karp 61', 80'	Report		Stadium: Victoria Stadium

== Final ==
The final was played on 6 December 2021.

6 December 2021	Lions Gibraltar	5–1	Lynx	Gibraltar
18:15	Alvez 11'; J. Gilbert 16', 24'; Ballantine 18'; Rodriguez 73'	Report	Orfila 88'	Stadium: Victoria Stadium

== Scorers ==
11 goals

- Mollie Karp (Lions Gibraltar)

7 goals

- Joelle Gilbert (Lions Gibraltar)

4 goals

- Mara Alvez (Lions Gibraltar)
- (Gibraltar) Sheralyn Orfila (Lynx)

2 goals

- Reighann Mascarenhas-Olivero (Lions Gibraltar)
- (Gibraltar) Noelle Laguea (Lynx)

1 goal

- Zoe Ballantine (Lions Gibraltar)
- Talia Gilbert (Lions Gibraltar)
- Isabella Rodriguez (Lions Gibraltar)

== See also ==
- 2021–22 Gibraltar Women's Football League
