= Shania Robba =

Gibraltarian footballer

Personal information
- Full name: Shania Caroline Robba
- Date of birth: 19 December 2001 (age 24)
- Place of birth: Gibraltar
- Position: Forward

Team information
- Current team: Algeciras FS B
- Number: 11

Youth career
- Lincoln Red Imps

College career
Years	Team	Apps	(Gls)
2020–2024	Loughborough University		

Senior career*
Years	Team	Apps	(Gls)
2014–2020	Lincoln Red Imps	64	(39)
2020–2022	Lions Gibraltar	3	(0)
2024	Loughborough Lightning	4	(0)
2024–2026	Linense FCB	13	(14)
2026	Lynx	1	(1)
2026–	Algeciras FS B	4	(2)

International career^{‡}
2018–2019	Gibraltar U16		
2021–	Gibraltar	23	(2)
- * Club domestic league appearances and goals as of 8 November 2026 ‡ National team caps and goals as of 10 October 2026

Shania Caroline Robba (born 19 December 2001) is a Gibraltarian footballer who plays for Algeciras FS B the Gibraltar women's national team as a striker.

== Club career ==
Robba began her career at the women's team of Lincoln Red Imps, playing with the boys' team at first until she stepped up to senior women's football at the age of 14. In 2018 and 2019, she attended trials at Everton, FC Twente and Liverpool alongside Red Imps teammate Tiffany Viagas. When Lincoln folded their women's team in 2020, Robba signed for Lions Gibraltar for the 2020–21 season, before heading off to Loughborough University that summer. In 2021 she appeared in the second season of the BT Sport series Ultimate Goal. She remained registered with Lions, making her first appearance of the 2021–22 season on 15 December 2021.

== International career ==
Having represented the Gibraltar U16s in two development tournaments in Malta in 2018 and 2019, Robba made her senior debut for Gibraltar on 24 June 2021 in a 1–4 friendly away loss to Liechtenstein, scoring Gibraltar's first ever goal in a FIFA-sanctioned match in the process.

== Personal life ==
Shania Robba is the twin sister of Gibraltar netball and futsal international Caitlin Robba, who has also played as a goalkeeper in association football and studied with her at Loughborough University. She currently plays for Mons Calpe Gibraltar Wave and also represents Gibraltar internationally. Shania is also a futsal player, representing Loughborough's women's team with her sister while also earning caps for Gibraltar's national futsal team, scoring twice on her debut against Belgium in a UEFA Women's Futsal Euro 2022 qualifier which ended 3–3.

== Career statistics ==
=== International ===
As of match played 10 October 2026.

Appearances and goals by national team and year
National team	Year	Apps	Goals
Gibraltar	2021	4	2
Gibraltar	2022	2	0
Gibraltar	2024	2	0
Gibraltar	2025	8	0
2026	7	0	
Total		23	2

==== International goals ====
Gibraltar score listed first, score column indicates score after each Robba goal.

International goals by date, venue, cap, opponent, score, result and competition
No.	Date	Venue	Cap	Opponent	Score	Result	Competition
1	24 June 2021	Freizeitpark Widau, Ruggell, Liechtenstein	1	Liechtenstein	1–4	1–4	Friendly
2	29 November 2021	Victoria Stadium, Gibraltar	4	Liechtenstein	1–2	2–3	Friendly
