= Gibraltar women's national football team results =

This is an all-time list of official results of the Gibraltar women's national football team.

== International matches ==
These are the official results of the Gibraltar women's national football team. Gibraltar's score is shown first in each case. The colours listed below are also used to signify results combined with the scoreline.

Key
Colour	Meaning
	Defeat
	Draw
	Win

Gibraltar women's national football team results
No.	Date	Venue	H/A	Opponents	Score	Competition	Gibraltar scorer(s)	Att.	Ref.
1	24 June 2021	Freizeitpark Widau, Ruggell	A	Liechtenstein	1–4	Friendly	Shania Robba	111	
2	27 June 2021	Freizeitpark Widau, Ruggell	A	Liechtenstein	1–2	Friendly	Joelle Gilbert	200	
3	26 November 2021	Victoria Stadium, Gibraltar	H	Liechtenstein	1–0	Friendly	Charlyann Pizzarello		
4	29 November 2021	Victoria Stadium, Gibraltar	H	Liechtenstein	2–3	Friendly	Shania Robba, Joelle Gilbert		
5	16 February 2022	Estadi Nacional, Andorra la Vella	A	Andorra	1–4	Friendly	Joelle Gilbert		
6	20 February 2022	Victoria Stadium, Gibraltar	H	Faroe Islands	0–1	Friendly			
7	5 September 2022	Victoria Stadium, Gibraltar	H	Hungary	0–12	Friendly			
8	26 June 2023	Victoria Stadium, Gibraltar	H	Panama	0–7	Friendly			
9	22 February 2024	Victoria Stadium, Gibraltar	H	Liechtenstein	2–3	Friendly	Reighann Olivero, Joelle Gilbert	150	
10	25 February 2024	Victoria Stadium, Gibraltar	H	Liechtenstein	1–1	Friendly	Joelle Gilbert	300	
11	23 October 2024	Europa Point Stadium, Gibraltar	H	Andorra	1–4	Friendly	Tiffany Viagas		
12	26 October 2024	Europa Point Stadium, Gibraltar	H	Andorra	2–4	Friendly	Joelle Gilbert, Tiffany Viagas		
13	21 February 2025	Nisporeni Central Stadium, Nisporeni	A	Moldova	0–1	2025 UEFA Women's Nations League C		123	
14	25 February 2025	Europa Point Stadium, Gibraltar	H	Faroe Islands	0–1	2025 UEFA Women's Nations League C		626	
15	4 April 2025	Europa Point Stadium, Gibraltar	H	Slovakia	0–8	2025 UEFA Women's Nations League C		583	
16	8 April 2025	Tórsvøllur, Tórshavn	A	Faroe Islands	0–5	2025 UEFA Women's Nations League C		528	
17	30 May 2025	Futbal Tatran Arena, Prešov	A	Slovakia	0–11	2025 UEFA Women's Nations League C		3,814	
18	3 June 2025	Europa Point Stadium, Gibraltar	H	Moldova	0–4	2025 UEFA Women's Nations League C		405	
19	22 October 2025	Estadi Nacional, Andorra la Vella	A	Andorra	0–2	Friendly			
20	25 October 2025	Estadi de la FAF, Encamp	A	Andorra	1–3	Friendly	Aimee Lawrence		
21	3 March 2026	Fadil Vokrri Stadium, Pristina	A	Kosovo	0–6	2027 FIFA Women's World Cup qualification		100	
22	7 March 2026	Europa Point Stadium, Gibraltar	H	Bulgaria	0–5	2027 FIFA Women's World Cup qualification		361	
23	14 April 2026	Europa Point Stadium, Gibraltar	H	Croatia	0–1	2027 FIFA Women's World Cup qualification		251	
24	18 April 2026	Gradski stadion, Sinj	A	Croatia	0–9	2027 FIFA Women's World Cup qualification			
25	5 June 2026	Stadion Aleksandar Shalamanov, Sofia	A	Bulgaria	1–3	2027 FIFA Women's World Cup qualification	Joelle Gilbert		
26	9 June 2026	Europa Point Stadium, Gibraltar	H	Kosovo	0–8	2027 FIFA Women's World Cup qualification			
27	10 October 2026	Rheinwiese Stadion, Schaan	A	Liechtenstein	0–3	Friendly			

== Head to head records ==
Opponent	P	W	D	L	GF	GA	GD	Win %	First	Last
Andorra	5	0	0	5	5	17	−12	0.00	2022	2025
Bulgaria	2	0	0	2	1	8	−7	0.00	2026	2026
Croatia	2	0	0	2	0	10	−10	0.00	2026	2026
Faroe Islands	3	0	0	3	0	7	−7	0.00	2022	2025
Hungary	1	0	0	1	0	12	−12	0.00	2022	2022
Kosovo	2	0	0	2	0	14	−14	0.00	2026	2026
Liechtenstein	7	1	1	5	8	16	−8	14.29	2021	2026
Moldova	2	0	0	2	0	5	−5	0.00	2025	2025
Panama	1	0	0	1	0	7	−7	0.00	2023	2023
Slovakia	2	0	0	2	0	19	−19	0.00	2025	2025
Total	27	1	1	25	14	115	−101	3.70	2021	2026
