= 2022–23 Gibraltar Women's Football League =

Gibraltar Women's Football League
- Season: 2022–23
- Dates: 28 September 2022 – 19 January 2023
- Champions: Lions Gibraltar (5th title)
- Matches played: 20
- Goals scored: 141 (7.05 per match)
- Top goalscorer: Andrea López (21 goals)
- Best goalkeeper: Chelsea Grech; Sophie Ward (3 clean sheets)
- All statistics correct as of 19 January 2023.

The 2022–23 Gibraltar Women's Football League was the seventh season of 11-a-side women's football in Gibraltar since the territory joined UEFA in 2013, and FIFA in 2016. The league had been in operation for a number of years previously, but often as a 9-a side tournament. Teams are ineligible for entry to the UEFA Women's Champions League as the league is considered a "development" tournament. Lions Gibraltar are the reigning champions from the previous season. The league kicked off on 28 September 2022, in a reduced format where teams only played each other twice, due to the scheduled demolition of Victoria Stadium to make room for the new Gibraltar National Stadium in 2023.

== Teams ==
For the first time since the 2018–19 season, the league is unchanged from the previous season.

Note: Flags indicate national team as has been defined under FIFA eligibility rules. Players may hold more than one non-FIFA nationality.

Team	Manager	Captain	Kit manufacturer	Club sponsor	2021–22
Europa	(Gibraltar) Gayle Langtry	(Gibraltar) Paula Costa	Kappa	Situs Construction	2nd
Gibraltar Wave	(Gibraltar) Ernest Tomsett	(Gibraltar) Amanda Jackson	Joma	FanPlay 365	4th
Lions Gibraltar	(England) Kyle Edwards	(Gibraltar) Andrya Rowbottom	Macron		1st
Lynx	(Spain) José Navas	(Gibraltar) Isabella Laguea	Givova	Grupo Casais	3rd
Manchester 62	(United States) Michael Anton Monsour	(Gibraltar) Abigal Evans	Macron	GADS	5th

== League table ==
Pos	Team	Pld	W	D	L	GF	GA	GD	Pts	Qualification
1	Lions Gibraltar (C)	8	8	0	0	48	3	+45	24	Possible Champions League preliminary round
2	Europa	8	5	0	3	63	12	+51	15	
3	Lynx	8	4	0	4	17	43	−26	12	
4	Gibraltar Wave	8	2	0	6	9	31	−22	6	
5	Manchester 62	8	1	0	7	4	52	−48	3	

Source: GFA
Rules for classification: 1) points; 2) goal difference; 3) number of goals scored.
(C) Champions

== Results ==
Home \ Away	EFC	GWA	LGI	LYN	MAN
Europa		9–0	0–3	16–0	16–0
Gibraltar Wave	3–0		0–8	2–4	4–3
Lions Gibraltar	5–1	3–0		10–0	8–0
Lynx	1–7	3–0	2–8		3–0
Manchester 62	0–14	1–0	0–3	0–4	

Source: GFA
Legend: Blue = home team win; Yellow = draw; Red = away team win.

== Season statistics ==
=== Scoring ===
==== Top scorers ====
Rank	Player	Club	Goals
1	(Spain) Andrea López	Europa	21
2	(Gibraltar) Mollie Karp	Lions Gibraltar	12
3	(Gibraltar) Harley McGuigan	Europa	10
4	(Gibraltar) Mara Todoran	Europa	9
5	(Gibraltar) Renai Marcus	Europa	7
5	(Gibraltar) Alexandra Holt	Lions Gibraltar	7
7	(Gibraltar) Reighann Olivero	Lions Gibraltar	6
8	(Gibraltar) Kayleigh Ferro	Lions Gibraltar	5
8	(Gibraltar) Joelle Gilbert	Lions Gibraltar	5
8	(Gibraltar) Nicole Nash	Lynx	5

==== Hat-tricks ====
Player	For	Against	Result	Date
(Gibraltar) Harley McGuigan^{5}	Europa	Manchester 62	14–0 (A)	28 September 2022
(Spain) Andrea López^{6}	Europa	Manchester 62	14–0 (A)	28 September 2022
(Gibraltar) Mollie Karp	Lions Gibraltar	Lynx	10–0 (H)	12 October 2022
(Spain) Andrea López^{4}	Europa	Gibraltar Wave	9–0 (H)	19 October 2022
(Gibraltar) Reighann Olivero	Lions Gibraltar	Europa	5–1 (H)	26 October 2022
(Gibraltar) Joelle Gilbert	Lions Gibraltar	Lynx	8–2 (A)	23 November 2022
(Gibraltar) Mara Alvez	Lions Gibraltar	Manchester 62	8–0 (H)	30 November 2022
(Gibraltar) Mollie Karp^{4}	Lions Gibraltar	Gibraltar Wave	8–0 (A)	13 December 2022
(Italy) Mara Todoran	Europa	Lynx	7–1 (A)	14 December 2022
(Spain) Andrea López^{6}	Europa	Lynx	16–0 (H)	22 December 2022
(Gibraltar) Harley McGuigan	Europa	Lynx	16–0 (H)	22 December 2022
(Gibraltar) Renai Marcus	Europa	Manchester 62	16–0 (H)	6 January 2023
(Spain) Andrea López^{4}	Europa	Manchester 62	16–0 (H)	6 January 2023
(Gibraltar) Nicole Nash	Lynx	Gibraltar Wave	4–2 (A)	19 January 2023

==== Clean Sheets ====
Rank	Player	Club	Clean sheets
1	(Gibraltar) Sophie Ward	Europa	3
1	(Gibraltar) Chelsea Grech	Lions Gibraltar	3
3	(Spain) Isabel Chico Nuñez	Lynx	2
4	(United States) Tess Beckwith	Europa	1
4	(Gibraltar) Zamara Espinosa	Lions Gibraltar	1
4	(Gibraltar) Gianna Grech	Manchester 62	1
