= 2023–24 Gibraltar Women's Football League =

Gibraltar Women's Football League
- Season: 2023–24
- Dates: 8 November 2023 – 10 April 2024
- Champions: Lions Gibraltar (6th title)
- Matches played: 30
- Goals scored: 151 (5.03 per match)
- Top goalscorer: (Gibraltar) Mara Alvez (Gibraltar) Mara Todoran (13 goals)
- Best goalkeeper: (Gibraltar) Rebecca Benggio (9 clean sheets)
- All statistics correct as of complete.

The 2023–24 Gibraltar Women's Football League is the eighth season of 11-a-side women's football in Gibraltar since the territory joined UEFA in 2013, and FIFA in 2016. The league had been in operation for a number of years previously, but often as a 9-a side tournament. Teams are ineligible for entry to the UEFA Women's Champions League as the league is considered a "development" tournament. Lions Gibraltar are the reigning champions from the previous season.

== Teams ==
Once again, 5 teams will contest the division, with the addition of Hercules to the league as a joint venture between Hercules Futsal Club and College 1975. Gibraltar Wave will operate this season as an affiliate of Mons Calpe, an agreement that began during the 2023 Women's Futsal League season. Manchester 62 were originally set to join but were denied entry to the league.

Note: Flags indicate national team as has been defined under FIFA eligibility rules. Players may hold more than one non-FIFA nationality.

Team	Manager	Captain	Kit manufacturer	Club sponsor	2022–23
Europa	(Gibraltar) Gayle Langtry	(Gibraltar) Tiana Borrell	Kappa	Situs Construction	2nd
Gibraltar Wave	(Gibraltar) Ernest Tomsett	(Gibraltar) Amanda Jackson	Joma		4th
Hercules	(Gibraltar) Jonny Cartwright	(Gibraltar) Katie Muldoon	Givova	The Hendrix	N/A
Lions Gibraltar	(Gibraltar) Zamara Espinosa	(Gibraltar) Kayleigh Ferro	Macron		1st
Lynx	(Spain) José Navas	(Gibraltar) Chantal Segui	Joma	Grupo Casais	3rd

== League table ==
Pos	Team	Pld	W	D	L	GF	GA	GD	Pts	Qualification
1	Lions Gibraltar	12	12	0	0	67	2	+65	36	Possible Champions League preliminary round
2	Europa	12	7	1	4	49	19	+30	22	
3	Lynx	12	6	0	6	18	35	−17	18	
4	Hercules	12	1	3	8	8	41	−33	6	
5	Gibraltar Wave	12	1	2	9	8	54	−46	5	

Source: GFA
Rules for classification: 1) points; 2) goal difference; 3) number of goals scored.

== Results ==
Matches 1–8
Home \ Away	EFC	GWA	HER	LGI	LYN
Europa		6–0	12–0	1–5	6–0
Gibraltar Wave	0–5		1–1	0–7	0–3
Hercules	0–4	2–2		0–6	1–6
Lions Gibraltar	8–1	7–0	3–0		4–0
Lynx	0–0	1–0	0–3	0–9	

Legend: Blue = home team win; Yellow = draw; Red = away team win.

Matches 9–12
Home \ Away	EFC	GWA	HER	LGI	LYN
Europa			0–0		0–3
Gibraltar Wave	1–11		2–1	0–7	
Hercules				0–3	1–2
Lions Gibraltar	2–0				6–0
Lynx		3–2			

Source: GFA
Legend: Blue = home team win; Yellow = draw; Red = away team win.

== Season statistics ==
=== Scoring ===
==== Top scorers ====
Rank	Player	Club	Goals
1	(Gibraltar) Mara Todoran	Europa	13
1	(Gibraltar) Mara Alvez	Lions Gibraltar	13
3	(Gibraltar) Nicole Nash	Lions Gibraltar	10
4	(Gibraltar) Kayleigh Ferro	Lions Gibraltar	7
5	(Gibraltar) Harley McGuigan	Europa	6
5	(Gibraltar) Sarah Popham	Europa	6
5	(Spain) Úrsula Navarro	Lions Gibraltar	6
5	(Gibraltar) Isabella Rodriguez	Lions Gibraltar	6
9	(Gibraltar) Justine Cantos	Europa	5
10	(Gibraltar) Renai Marcus	Europa	4
10	(Gibraltar) Gianelle Hanglin	Gibraltar Wave	4
10	(Spain) Ana De La Torre	Lynx	4

==== Hat-tricks ====
Player	For	Against	Result	Date
(Gibraltar) Mara Todoran^{4}	Europa	Lynx	6–0 (H)	8 November 2023
(Gibraltar) Isabella Rodriguez	Lions Gibraltar	Europa	8–1 (H)	15 November 2023
(Gibraltar) Justine Cantos	Europa	Hercules	12–0 (H)	6 December 2023
(Gibraltar) Harley McGuigan	Europa	Hercules	12–0 (H)	6 December 2023
(Spain) Ana De La Torre	Lynx	Hercules	1–6 (A)	13 December 2023
(Gibraltar) Mara Alvez	Lions Gibraltar	Europa	1–5 (A)	17 January 2024
(Gibraltar) Mara Alvez	Lions Gibraltar	Lynx	0–9 (A)	24 January 2024
(Gibraltar) Nicole Nash	Lions Gibraltar	Lynx	0–9 (A)	24 January 2024
(Gibraltar) Sarah Popham	Europa	Gibraltar Wave	1–11 (A)	29 February 2024

=== Clean sheets ===
Rank	Player	Club	Clean sheets
1	(Gibraltar) Rebecca Benggio	Lions Gibraltar	9
2	(Gibraltar) Gianna Grech	Europa	5
3	(Gibraltar) Seleen Celecia	Europa	1
3	(Gibraltar) Shauna Martin	Hercules	1
3	(Spain) Marta Ortiz	Hercules	1
3	(Spain) Isabel Chico Nuñez	Lynx	1

== See also ==
- 2024 Women's Rock Cup
