= 2026–27 Gibraltar Women's Football League =

Gibraltar Women's Football League
- Season: 2026–27
- Dates: 14 September 2026 – TBA
- Matches: 6
- Goals: 35 (5.83 per match)
- All statistics correct as of 14 October 2026.

The 2026–27 Gibraltar Women's Football League is the eleventh season of 11-a-side women's football in Gibraltar since the territory joined UEFA in 2013, and FIFA in 2016. The league had been in operation for a number of years previously, but often as a 9-a side tournament. Teams are ineligible for entry to the UEFA Women's Champions League as the league is considered a "development" tournament. Mons Calpe are the reigning champions from the previous season.

== Teams ==
The Gibraltar Football Association announced on 9 February 2026 that 5 teams (not including the GFA Girls U16 team) applied for their licenses into the 2026–27 season. Lions Gibraltar were denied a license for their return due to missing paperwork while St Joseph's missed the deadline to apply. FC Magpies joined the league as a new team.

Note: Flags indicate national team as has been defined under FIFA eligibility rules. Players may hold more than one non-FIFA nationality.

Team	Manager	Captain	Kit manufacturer	Club sponsor	2025–26
College 1975	(Gibraltar) Jonny Cartwright	(Spain) Oumaima Lamsalli	Nike		2nd
GFA Girls U16	(Gibraltar) James Watson	(Gibraltar) Scarlett-Rose Flegg	Adidas	Peninsula	4th
Lynx	(Spain) José Navas	(Gibraltar) Chantal Segui	Givova	EWMS	3rd
FC Magpies	(Gibraltar) Chris Ward	(Gibraltar) Danika Jones	Macron		N/A
Mons Calpe	(Spain) Dani Amaya	(Spain) Patricia Vega	Givova		1st

== League table ==
Pos	Team	Pld	W	D	L	GF	GA	GD	Pts
1	College Hercules	2	2	0	0	13	0	+13	6
2	GFA Girls U16	3	2	0	1	15	4	+11	6
3	Lynx	3	2	0	1	5	2	+3	6
4	Mons Calpe	3	1	0	2	2	6	−4	3
5	FC Magpies	2	0	0	2	0	23	−23	0

Updated to match(es) played on 14 October 2026. Source: GFA
Rules for classification: 1) points; 2) goal difference; 3) number of goals scored.

== Results ==
Matches 1–8
Home \ Away	COL	GFA	LYN	FCM	MON
College 1975				12–0	
GFA Girls U16			1–2		
Lynx	0–1				3–0
FC Magpies		0–11			
Mons Calpe		2–3			

Updated to match(es) played on 14 October 2026. Source:
Legend: Blue = home team win; Yellow = draw; Red = away team win.

== Season statistics ==
=== Scoring ===
==== Top scorers ====
Rank	Player	Club	Goals
1	(Gibraltar) Rafaella Falero	GFA Girls	7
2	(Uruguay) Daiana Lazaeta	College 1975	6
3	(Gibraltar) Myah Jurado	College 1975	3
4	(Gibraltar) Maleah Akuma	GFA Girls U16	2
4	(Spain) Patricia Vega	Mons Calpe	2
6	(Spain) Marina Martí	College 1975	1
6	(Gibraltar) Arianne Parody	College 1975	1
6	(United States) Erica Petrie	College 1975	1
6	(Gibraltar) Macey Twigger	College 1975	1
6	(Gibraltar) Amira Ben Hammou	GFA Girls U16	1
6	(Gibraltar) Amal El Mokhalfi	GFA Girls U16	1
6	(Gibraltar) Mya Raineri	GFA Girls U16	1
6	(Gibraltar) Sophie Vinet	GFA Girls U16	1
6	(Spain) Coraima Cereto	Lynx	1
6	(Spain) Ana de La Torre	Lynx	1

==== Hat-tricks ====
Scorer's team first.

Player	For	Against	Result	Date
(Uruguay) Daiana Lazaeta^{6}	College 1975	FC Magpies	12–0 (H)	14 September 2026
(Gibraltar) Myah Jurado	College 1975	FC Magpies	12–0 (H)	14 September 2026

=== Clean sheets ===
Rank	Player	Club	Clean sheets
1	(Gibraltar) Kyrelle Revagliatte	College 1975	2
2	(Gibraltar) Alexandra Escalona	GFA Girls U16	1
