= 2021–22 Gibraltar Women's Football League =

Gibraltar Women's Football League
- Season: 2021–22
- Dates: 20 September 2021–8 March 2022
- Champions: Lions Gibraltar (4th title)
- Matches played: 30
- Goals scored: 263 (8.77 per match)
- Top goalscorer: (Gibraltar) Andrea López Guerrero (29 goals)
- Best goalkeeper: (Gibraltar) Chelsea Grech (7 clean sheets)
- Biggest home win: Lions Gibraltar 23–0 Manchester 62 (9 December 2021)
- Biggest away win: Manchester 62 0–14 Lions Gibraltar (13 October 2021); Manchester 62 1–15 Europa (17 November 2021)
- Highest scoring: Lions Gibraltar 23–0 Manchester 62 (9 December 2021)
- All statistics correct as of 8 March 2022.

The 2021–22 Gibraltar Women's Football League is the sixth season of 11-a-side women's football in Gibraltar since the territory joined UEFA in 2013, and FIFA in 2016. The league had been in operation for a number of years previously, but teams were ineligible for entry to the UEFA Women's Champions League as it was only a 9-a-side tournament. Lions Gibraltar were the reigning champions from the previous season, which had been shortened due to the COVID-19 pandemic.

This season is set to be the first since the 2016–17 season where more than 3 teams participate, with two new teams entering the competition. Lions Gibraltar retained their title in March 2022, having won every single game and conceding no goals throughout, with 115 goals in 12 games.

== Teams ==
Gibraltar Wave joined the league for the first time, having first competed in the 2021 Women's Futsal League following their foundation at the start of the year. Manchester 62 returned to the league following a 5-year absence.

Note: Flags indicate national team as has been defined under FIFA eligibility rules. Players may hold more than one non-FIFA nationality.

Team	Manager	Captain	Kit manufacturer	Club sponsor
Europa	(Gibraltar) Gayle Langtry	(Gibraltar) Paula Costa	Kappa	
Gibraltar Wave	(Gibraltar) Andy Parody	(Gibraltar) Narges Mararat	Givova	FanPlay 365
Lions Gibraltar	(England) Kyle Edwards	(Gibraltar) Andrya Rowbottom	Macron	
Lynx	(Spain) Carlos Navas	(Gibraltar) Isabella Laguea	Givova	Grupo Casais
Manchester 62	(Gibraltar) Angelo Vassallo	(Gibraltar) Nicola Asquez	Joma	CEPSA GIB

=== Managerial Changes ===
Team	Outgoing manager	Manner of departure	Date of vacancy	Position in table	Incoming manager	Date of appointment
Lions Gibraltar	(Gibraltar) Janssen Olivero	Appointed by Gibraltar FA	1 June 2021	Pre-season	(England) Kyle Edwards	18 August 2021
Lynx	(Gibraltar) Colin Griffiths	Resigned	30 June 2021	Pre-season	(Spain) Carlos Navas	1 September 2021

== League table ==
Pos	Team	Pld	W	D	L	GF	GA	GD	Pts	Qualification
1	Lions Gibraltar (C)	12	12	0	0	115	0	+115	36	Possible Champions League preliminary round
2	Europa	12	9	0	3	96	22	+74	27	
3	Lynx	12	4	1	7	26	45	−19	13	
4	Gibraltar Wave	12	3	2	7	23	67	−44	11	
5	Manchester 62	12	0	1	11	3	129	−126	1	

Source: GFA
Rules for classification: 1) points; 2) goal difference; 3) number of goals scored.
(C) Champions

== Results ==
Matches 1–8
Home \ Away	EFC	GWA	LGI	LYN	MAN
Europa		12–2	0–2	7–0	20–1
Gibraltar Wave	0–11		0–13	3–0	9–0
Lions Gibraltar	7–0	9–0		12–0	23–0
Lynx	0–11	6–0	0–3		8–0
Manchester 62	1–15	1–1	0–14	0–4	

Source: GFA
Legend: Blue = home team win; Yellow = draw; Red = away team win.

Matches 9–12
Home \ Away	EFC	GWA	LGI	LYN	MAN
Europa		2–1		3–0	
Gibraltar Wave			0–10		4–0
Lions Gibraltar	8–0			3–0	
Lynx		3–3			5–0
Manchester 62	0–15		0–11		

Source: GFA
Legend: Blue = home team win; Yellow = draw; Red = away team win.

Note: Gibraltar Wave were awarded a 3–0 walkover win over Lynx on 12 January after Lynx failed to field a team, as were Europa on 9 February. Lions Gibraltar were also awarded a 3–0 win over Lynx on 19 January after their game against Lynx was abandoned.

== Season statistics ==
=== Scoring ===
==== Top scorers ====
Rank	Player	Club	Goals
1	(Gibraltar) Andrea López Guerrero	Europa	29
2	(Gibraltar) Mara Todoran	Europa	22
3	(Gibraltar) Mollie Karp	Lions Gibraltar	18
4	(Gibraltar) Joelle Gilbert	Lions Gibraltar	17
5	(Gibraltar) Mara Alvez	Lions Gibraltar	16
6	(Gibraltar) Isabella Rodriguez	Lions Gibraltar	12
7	(Gibraltar) Reighann Mascarenhas-Olivero	Lions Gibraltar	11
8	(Gibraltar) Kayleigh Ferro	Lions Gibraltar	9
9	(Gibraltar) Gianelle Hanglin	Gibraltar Wave	8
9	(Gibraltar) Zoe Ballantine	Lions Gibraltar	8

==== Hat-tricks ====
Player	For	Against	Result	Date
(Gibraltar) Julia Lima	Gibraltar Wave	Manchester 62	9–0 (H)	20 September 2021
(Gibraltar) Gianelle Hanglin	Gibraltar Wave	Manchester 62	9–0 (H)	20 September 2021
(Gibraltar) Reighann Mascarenhas-Olivero^{4}	Lions Gibraltar	Lynx	12–0 (H)	20 September 2021
(Gibraltar) Mara Alvez	Lions Gibraltar	Lynx	12–0 (H)	20 September 2021
(Gibraltar) Isabella Rodriguez	Lions Gibraltar	Manchester 62	14–0 (A)	13 October 2021
(Gibraltar) Mollie Karp^{4}	Lions Gibraltar	Manchester 62	14–0 (A)	13 October 2021
(Gibraltar) Andrea López Guerrero	Europa	Gibraltar Wave	12–2 (H)	13 October 2021
(Gibraltar) Anna Howard	Europa	Gibraltar Wave	12–2 (H)	13 October 2021
(Spain) Laura Marquez Pacheco^{5}	Lynx	Manchester 62	8–0 (H)	20 October 2021
(Gibraltar) Mollie Karp^{4}	Lions Gibraltar	Gibraltar Wave	13–0 (A)	1 November 2021
(Gibraltar) Sheralyn Orfila^{4}	Lynx	Gibraltar Wave	6–0 (H)	17 November 2021
(Gibraltar) Andrea López Guerrero^{5}	Europa	Manchester 62	15–1 (A)	17 November 2021
(Gibraltar) Harley McGuigan	Europa	Manchester 62	15–1 (A)	17 November 2021
(Gibraltar) Andrea López Guerrero^{6}	Europa	Gibraltar Wave	11–0 (A)	8 December 2021
(Gibraltar) Isabella Rodriguez	Lions Gibraltar	Manchester 62	23–0 (H)	9 December 2021
(Gibraltar) Mollie Karp^{6}	Lions Gibraltar	Manchester 62	23–0 (H)	9 December 2021
(Gibraltar) Sophia Brinkman^{4}	Lions Gibraltar	Manchester 62	23–0 (H)	9 December 2021
(Gibraltar) Mara Todoran	Europa	Lynx	11–0 (A)	20 December 2021
(Gibraltar) Zoe Ballantine	Lions Gibraltar	Gibraltar Wave	9–0 (H)	20 December 2021
(Gibraltar) Andrea López Guerrero	Europa	Lynx	7–0 (H)	4 January 2022
(Gibraltar) Andrea López Guerrero^{6}	Europa	Manchester 62	20–1 (H)	12 January 2022
(Gibraltar) Mara Todoran^{6}	Europa	Manchester 62	20–1 (H)	12 January 2022
(Gibraltar) Akisha Ferrell^{4}	Europa	Manchester 62	20–1 (H)	12 January 2022
(Gibraltar) Ruth Wahnich	Europa	Manchester 62	20–1 (H)	12 January 2022
(Gibraltar) Joelle Gilbert^{5}	Lions Gibraltar	Gibraltar Wave	10–0 (A)	9 February 2022
(Gibraltar) Mara Todoran^{8}	Europa	Manchester 62	15–0 (A)	2 March 2022
(Gibraltar) Andrea López Guerrero^{4}	Europa	Manchester 62	15–0 (A)	2 March 2022
(Gibraltar) Mara Alvez	Lions Gibraltar	Europa	8–0 (H)	5 March 2022
(Gibraltar) Joelle Gilbert	Lions Gibraltar	Manchester 62	11–0 (A)	8 March 2022
(Gibraltar) Kayleigh Tellez	Lions Gibraltar	Manchester 62	11–0 (A)	8 March 2022

==== Clean Sheets ====
Rank	Player	Club	Clean sheets
1	(Gibraltar) Chelsea Grech	Lions Gibraltar	7
2	(Gibraltar) Sophie Ward	Europa	2
2	(Spain) Isabel Chico Nuñez	Lynx	2
4	(Gibraltar) Harley McGuigan	Europa	1
4	(Gibraltar) Katie Muldoon	Europa	1
4	(Gibraltar) Amanda Jackson	Gibraltar Wave	1
4	(Gibraltar) Narges Mararat	Gibraltar Wave	1
4	(Gibraltar) Zamara Espinosa	Lions Gibraltar	1
4	(Spain) Inés Fernández Lifante	Lions Gibraltar	1
4	(Gibraltar) Zarajan Lopez	Lions Gibraltar	1
4	(Gibraltar) Kaci Brownbridge	Lynx	1
4	(Gibraltar) Jaylene Gaivizo	Lynx	1
