= 2024 Women's Rock Cup =

Women's football tournament season

Tournament details
- Country: Gibraltar
- Dates: 18 April – 14 May 2024
- Teams: 6

Final positions
- Champions: Lions Gibraltar (4th title)
- Runners-up: Europa

Tournament statistics
- Matches played: 10
- Goals scored: 44 (4.4 per match)

The 2024 Women's Rock Cup is the premier women's cup tournament contested by clubs from Gibraltar. It is the 10th edition of the tournament since the Gibraltar Football Association joined UEFA in 2013.

Lions Gibraltar are the reigning champions, having defeated Lynx in the previous season's final.

== Format ==
In a change to previous editions, this season's Women's Rock Cup will feature a group stage before knock-outs. 6 teams will participate in this season's edition, with the five teams competing in the Gibraltar Women's Football League joined by a Gibraltar U16 representative team. The GFA Girls team and Hercules will make their debuts in the competition.

== Groups ==
=== Group A ===
Pos	Team	Pld	W	D	L	GF	GA	GD	Pts	Qualification
1	Lions Gibraltar	2	2	0	0	8	1	+7	6	Qualification for Semi-finals
2	Lynx	2	1	0	1	1	4	−3	3	Qualification for Semi-finals
3	GFA Girls	2	0	0	2	1	5	−4	0	

Updated to match(es) played on 23 April 2024. Source: GFA
Rules for classification: 1) points; 2) goal difference; 3) number of goals scored

18 April 2024	Lynx	1–0	GFA Girls	Victoria Stadium
18:30	Baitson 70'			Referee: Juan Vega

23 April 2024	Lions Gibraltar	4–0	Lynx	Victoria Stadium
20:00	Nash 6', 57'; Ferro 45+1'; Rodriguez 46'			Referee: Keilan Prescott

2 May 2024	GFA Girls	1–4	Lions Gibraltar	Victoria Stadium
18:30	Todd 46'		Rowbottom 19', 55'; Alvez 72'; Nash 74'	Referee: Raymond Gomez

=== Group B ===
Pos	Team	Pld	W	D	L	GF	GA	GD	Pts	Qualification
1	Europa	2	2	0	0	10	0	+10	6	Qualification for Semi-finals
2	Hercules	2	1	0	1	3	8	−5	3	Qualification for Semi-finals
3	Gibraltar Wave	2	0	0	2	1	6	−5	0	

Updated to match(es) played on unknown. Source: GFA
Rules for classification: 1) points; 2) goal difference; 3) number of goals scored

18 April 2024	Gibraltar Wave	1–3	Hercules	Victoria Stadium
21:00	Montes Molina 17'		Coen 7' (pen.); Rodriguez 35'; Muldoon 59'	Referee: Raymond Gomez

24 April 2024	Europa	3–0 (w/o)	Gibraltar Wave	Victoria Stadium
18:30

2 May 2024	Hercules	0–7	Europa	Victoria Stadium
21:00			Cantos 6'; Hernandez 37'; Duarte 48'; Hernandez 84'; Todoran 88'	Referee: Keilan Prescott

== Semi-finals ==
The top 2 from each group will progress to the semi-finals of the competition.

7 May 2024	Lions Gibraltar	9–0	Hercules	Victoria Stadium
21:00				Referee: Aaron Ignacio

8 May 2024	Europa	6–0	Lynx	Victoria Stadium
18:30	Howard 32'; Cantos 40', 80'; Duarte 48'; Hernandez 84'; Todoran 88'			Referee: Keilan Prescott

== Third Place Play-off ==
The losers from the semi-final faced each other in the third place play-off.

13 May 2024	Lynx	3–0	Hercules	Victoria Stadium
21:00	Segui 52'; De La Torre Palma 61', 64'			Referee: Keilan Prescott

== Final ==
14 May 2024	Europa	1–2	Lions Gibraltar	Victoria Stadium
19:00	Todoran 48'		Nash 9'; Navarro 44'	Referee: Juan Vega
