= 2024–25 Gibraltar Women's Football League =

Gibraltar Women's Football League
- Season: 2024–25
- Dates: 19 September 2024 – TBA
- Champions: Lions Gibraltar (7th title)
- Matches: 30
- Goals: 168 (5.6 per match)
- Top goalscorer: (Gibraltar) Mara Alvez (Gibraltar) Elise Sztejnmiler (15 goals)
- Best goalkeeper: (Gibraltar) Gianna Grech (Gibraltar) Caitlin Robba (4 clean sheets)

The 2024–25 Gibraltar Women's Football League is the ninth season of 11-a-side women's football in Gibraltar since the territory joined UEFA in 2013, and FIFA in 2016. The league had been in operation for a number of years previously, but often as a 9-a side tournament. Teams are ineligible for entry to the UEFA Women's Champions League as the league is considered a "development" tournament. Lions Gibraltar are the reigning champions from the previous season.

== Teams ==
Europa withdrew from the team this season, with GFA Girls (the Gibraltar women's under-16 team) taking their place. New rules by the GFA forced Hercules and Gibraltar Wave to play under the names of their affiliated men's teams this season, meaning that they will play as College 1975 and Mons Calpe, respectively.

Note: Flags indicate national team as has been defined under FIFA eligibility rules. Players may hold more than one non-FIFA nationality.

Team	Manager	Captain	Kit manufacturer	Club sponsor	2023–24
College Hercules	(Gibraltar) Jonny Cartwright	(Gibraltar) Katie Muldoon	Givova	The Hendrix	4th
GFA Girls	(Gibraltar) James Watson	(Gibraltar) Amber Victory	Adidas	Peninsula	N/A
Lions Gibraltar	(Gibraltar) Zamara Espinosa	(Gibraltar) Andrya Rowbottom	VX3	OLBG	1st
Lynx	(Spain) José Navas	(Gibraltar) Chantal Segui	Joma	First Choice Care	3rd
Mons Calpe Gibraltar Wave	(Gibraltar) Col Griffiths	(Gibraltar) Kymara Payas	Joma		5th

== League table ==
Pos	Team	Pld	W	D	L	GF	GA	GD	Pts
1	Lions Gibraltar (C)	12	10	1	1	48	8	+40	31
2	GFA Girls	12	8	2	2	52	22	+30	26
3	Mons Calpe Gibraltar Wave	12	5	0	7	22	37	−15	15
4	Lynx	12	4	1	7	32	26	+6	13
5	College Hercules	12	1	0	11	15	76	−61	3

Source: GFA
Rules for classification: 1) points; 2) goal difference; 3) number of goals scored.
(C) Champions

== Results ==
Matches 1–8
Home \ Away	COL	GFA	LGI	LYN	MON
College Hecules		3–5	0–7	2–6	1–4
GFA Girls	8–4		2–4	4–4	2–0
Lions Gibraltar	3–0	1–1		3–2	3–0
Lynx	7–0	1–2	1–3		9–0
Mons Calpe Gibraltar Wave	1–4	0–5	0–5	2–0	

Legend: Blue = home team win; Yellow = draw; Red = away team win.

Matches 9–12
Home \ Away	COL	GFA	LGI	LYN	MON
College Hercules		0–11	0–12		
GFA Girls			1–4	4–0	
Lions Gibraltar				3–0	0–1
Lynx	2–0				0–2
Mons Calpe Gibraltar Wave	10–1	1–7			

Legend: Blue = home team win; Yellow = draw; Red = away team win.

== Season statistics ==
=== Scoring ===
==== Top scorers ====
Rank	Player	Club	Goals
1	(Gibraltar) Elise Sztejnmiler	GFA Girls	15
1	(Gibraltar) Mara Alvez	Lions Gibraltar	15
3	(Gibraltar) Nicole Nash	Mons Calpe Gibraltar Wave (Note: Includes 9 goals for Lions Gibraltar.)	14
4	(Gibraltar) Julia De Los Santos	GFA Girls	10
5	(Gibraltar) Megan Todd	GFA Girls	8
5	(Gibraltar) Gianelle Hanglin	Mons Calpe Gibraltar Wave (Note: includes 7 goals for College Hercules.)	8
7	(Gibraltar) Macey Twigger	GFA Girls	6
8	(Spain) Ana de la Torre	Lynx	6
8	(Spain) Lydia Piñeda	Mons Calpe Gibraltar Wave	6
10	(Spain) Coraima Cereto	Lynx	5

==== Hat-tricks ====
Scorer's team first.

Player	For	Against	Result	Date
(Gibraltar) Gianelle Hanglin	College Hercules	GFA Girls	3–5 (H)	19 September 2024
(Gibraltar) Elise Sztejnmiler	GFA Girls	College Hercules	5–3 (A)	19 September 2024
(Spain) Coraima Cereto	Lynx	Mons Calpe Gibraltar Wave	9–0 (H)	9 October 2024
(Gibraltar) Gianelle Hanglin	College Hercules	GFA Girls	4–8 (A)	6 November 2024
(Gibraltar) Megan Todd	GFA Girls	College Hercules	8–4 (H)	6 November 2024
(Gibraltar) Nicole Nash	Lions Gibraltar	College Hercules	7–0 (A)	11 November 2024
(Gibraltar) Nicole Nash	Lions Gibraltar	Mons Calpe Gibraltar Wave	5–0 (A)	13 November 2024
(Spain) Ana de la Torre	Lynx	GFA Girls	4–4 (A)	8 January 2025
(Gibraltar) Julia De Los Santos^{6}	GFA Girls	College Hercules	11–0 (A)	2 April 2025
(Gibraltar) Elise Sztejnmiler^{4}	GFA Girls	College Hercules	11–0 (A)	2 April 2025
(Gibraltar) Mara Alvez	Lions Gibraltar	GFA Girls	4–1 (A)	15 April 2025
(Gibraltar) Julia De Los Santos^{6}	GFA Girls	Mons Calpe Gibraltar Wave	7–1 (A)	24 April 2025
(Gibraltar) Mara Alvez^{5}	Lions Gibraltar	College Hercules	12–0 (A)	30 April 2025
(Spain) Lydia Piñeda	Mons Calpe Gibraltar Wave	College Hercules	10–1 (H)	7 May 2025
(Gibraltar) Karyn Barnett	Mons Calpe Gibraltar Wave	College Hercules	10–1 (H)	7 May 2025

=== Clean sheets ===
Rank	Player	Club	Clean sheets
1	(Gibraltar) Gianna Grech	Lions Gibraltar	4
1	(Gibraltar) Caitlin Robba	Mons Calpe Gibraltar Wave	4
3	(Gibraltar) Lorena Shepherd	GFA Girls	3
3	(Gibraltar) Jaylene Gaivizo	Lynx	3
5	(Gibraltar) Scarlett-Rose Flegg	GFA Girls	1
