= Football in Gibraltar =

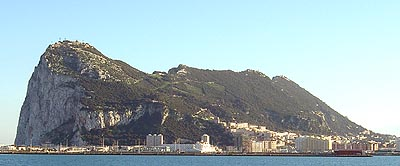
- Gibraltar is a British overseas territory with a long tradition of football.
- Country: Gibraltar
- Governing body: Gibraltar Football Association
- National team: Gibraltar
- Nickname: Gib
- First played: 1892
- Clubs: 12

Audience records
- Season: Gibraltar National League

Football has been a popular part of sport in Gibraltar since its introduction by British military personnel in the 19th century. The Gibraltar Football Association, founded in 1895, is one of the ten oldest active football associations in the world.

== History ==
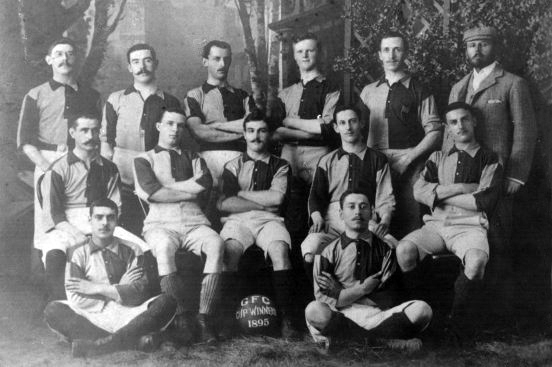
Winning team of the 1895 Merchants Cup of the Gibraltar Football Club.

Football was introduced to the civilian population of Gibraltar by the British Armed Forces in the late 19th century. It is not known exactly when the first civilian football teams were formed, but the earliest records mention that the Prince of Wales F.C. already existed in 1892, and the Gibraltar F.C. was formed in November 1893.

Between 1895 and 1907, the only known football competition organised by the Gibraltar Civilian Football Association was the Merchants Cup. The cup was donated each year by the Merchants of Gibraltar. The first ever Cup Final was between the Gibraltar F.C. and the Jubilee F.C. and was witnessed by 1,500 spectators.

In 1902, the military authorities in Gibraltar designated one of their four football grounds at North Front as a civilian ground. Before this there was no civilian football grounds in Gibraltar, so the only way the Gibraltar Civilian Football Association could practice outside the annual Merchants Cup was by playing friendly matches against the military teams whenever possible.

=== Gibraltar Football League ===
The Gibraltar Football League was set up in October 1907. The military had well-established league and cup competitions before this, but local civil teams were not allowed to compete in them. The first league competition saw eight teams competing, with Prince of Wales F.C. being the winner. The growing success of the league and cup competitions was reflected in the increasing number of new teams that were registering with the association. Such was the increase in participating teams that a Second Division was added in 1909, and in 1910 the association was organising separate leagues and cup competitions for senior and junior divisions. This continuously growing interest in football in Gibraltar was also reflected in the association's affiliation with The Football Association in 1909. Up until 2005–06, the league operated a Third Division, however the loss of several reserve teams that dominated the Second Division led to the two divisions merging. At one point there was also a Fourth Division, however this was only thought to have lasted for one season in 1996-97

Years later, the Gibraltar Civilian Football Association changed its name to the Gibraltar Football Association; it has continued to organise league competitions and promote the sport within The Rock to this day.

=== Golden era ===
The period between 1949 and 1955 is regarded as the "Golden era" for football in Gibraltar. It was during this time that world-renowned teams such as Real Madrid CF, Atlético Madrid, Real Valladolid and Admira Wacker among many others were arriving on The Rock to play against the national team who acquitted themselves admirably against professionals despite being amateurs.

== League system ==
=== Current system ===
Level	Leagues/Divisions
1	Gibraltar Football League (11 clubs)

=== Former system ===
Level	Leagues/Divisions
1	Gibraltar Premier Division (10 clubs)
2	Gibraltar Second Division (7 clubs)

== National team ==
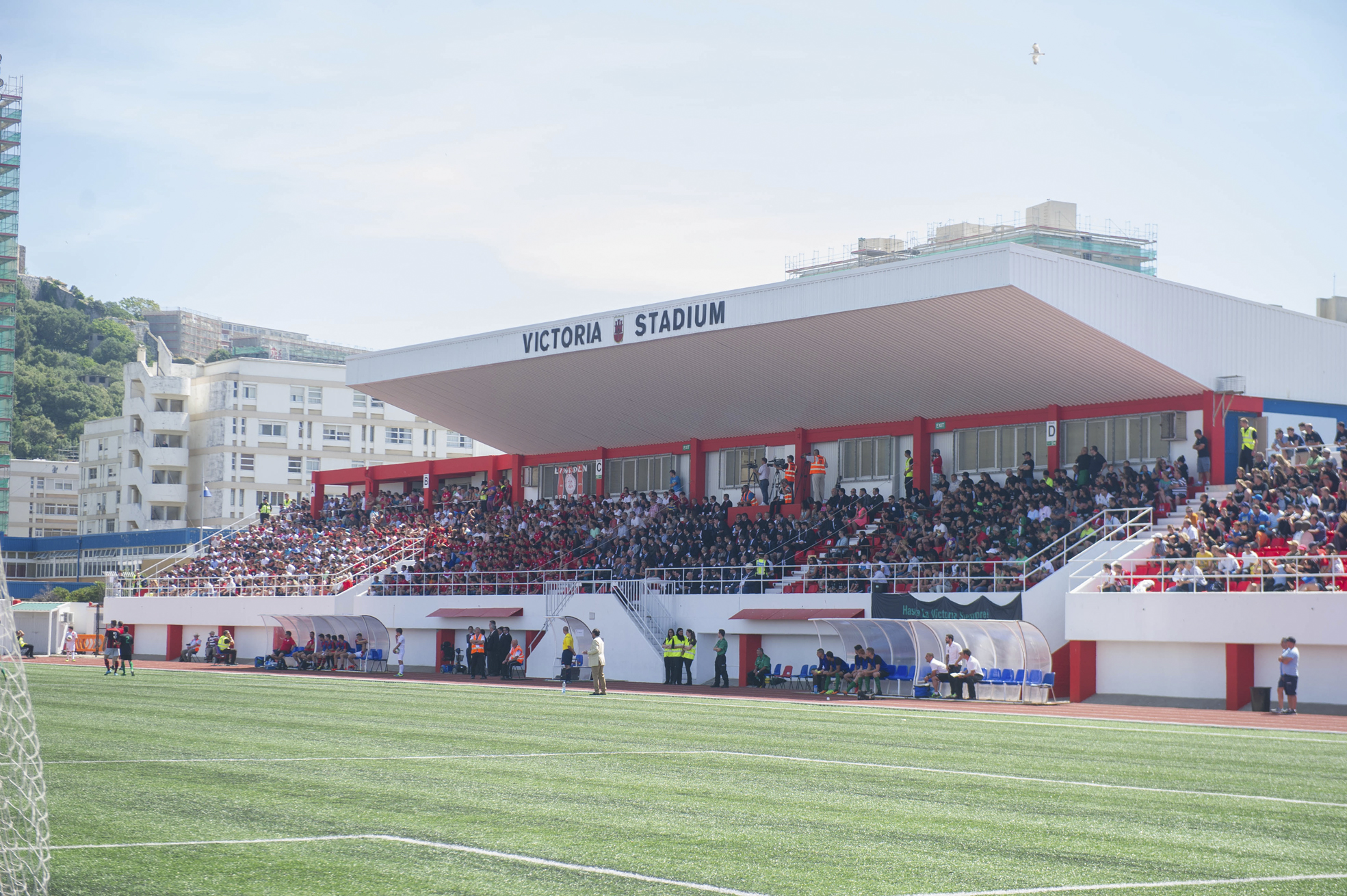
The Victoria Stadium is the home of the national football team of Gibraltar.

The Gibraltar national football team has a long history, originally competing against teams of visiting British military personnel. The highlight of their existence to date was a draw with Real Madrid CF in 1949 at a time when the Spanish club were about to enter a period of European dominance. On the most part though, they compete in smaller matches against non-sovereign national teams. Gibraltar won the championship at the 2007 Island Games, held in Rhodes (Greece).

The Gibraltar national team play their matches, as do most of the clubs in the territory, at the 5,000 capacity FIFA approved and licensed Victoria Stadium.

=== UEFA application ===
On 8 January 1997 the GFA applied for FIFA membership, and in March 1999 FIFA confirmed that the GFA fulfilled the requirements of Article 4.7 of the FIFA Statutes and consequently passed their file onto UEFA.

On 12 April 1999 the GFA applied for membership in UEFA (Union of European Football Associations). This would have allowed them to join the qualifiers for the European Football Championships and enter teams in European club competition. This immediately drew a hostile reception from the Royal Spanish Football Federation, whose government strongly opposes any suggestion that Gibraltar is in fact a separate territory and not part of Spain. Spanish authorities waged a campaign of virulent opposition to their application, causing it to be rejected by officials on the grounds that it did not meet their criteria. In 2002 UEFA had stipulated that future members would have to be sovereign nations, despite a number of their existing members failing to meet this requirement.

After a legal challenge, a ruling by the Court of Arbitration for Sport in 2006 insisted that UEFA had to accept the GFA as any other member, as the application had come before the new criteria had been put in place and the rejection had political overtones, which are strongly discouraged in sport. UEFA awarded the GFA associate member status along with Montenegro and deferred the matter to the 2007 Congress in Düsseldorf, Germany.

Spanish delegates had for some months, by attempting to secure support for their position, even been threatening to withdraw Spanish teams from UEFA competitions if Gibraltar was approved. This tactic was successful – winning the vote 45 to 3, with 5 abstentions. Gibraltar's application was at this point thrown out, while Montenegro was unanimously granted membership.

On 3 October 2012, UEFA again granted Gibraltar provisional membership and deferred the matter about full membership to the next Congress, to be held in London in May 2013. The decision was taken to admit Gibraltar to UEFA. On 24 May 2013, Gibraltar became the 54th member of UEFA, with a team in the UEFA Champions League from the 2014/15 season. UEFA confirmed that due to the political dispute with Spain, the two countries would be kept apart in qualifying competitions.

On 23 February 2014, Gibraltar were drawn against Germany, Poland, Scotland, the Republic of Ireland and Georgia in the qualifying rounds for UEFA Euro 2016

=== FIFA ===
On 13 May 2016, Gibraltar was granted FIFA membership so they can enter for the World Cup. They were placed in Group H along with Belgium, Bosnia and Herzegovina, Greece, Estonia, Cyprus. The first game Gibraltar played took place on 6 September 2016 at home to Greece.

== Women's football ==
The Women's Rock Cup is the top annual cup tournament for women's football in Gibraltar. It is the women's equivalent to the Rock Cup. The first known edition of the Women's Rock Cup was held in 2013, won by Manchester 62. Due to the lack of teams in Gibraltar, with the Gibraltar Women's Football League often only consisting of three teams, the format has often varied in order to ensure that it remains competitive.

=== List of champions ===
This list goes back to the earliest known edition of the tournament. It is not known if the Women's Rock Cup was contested before 2013.

Season	Champion	Runner up	Notes
2013	Manchester 62	Unknown	
2014	Manchester 62	St Joseph's	9-a-side
2015	Manchester 62	Lions Gibraltar	9-a-side
2016	Lincoln Red Imps	Lions Gibraltar	9-a-side
2017	Lincoln Red Imps	Lions Gibraltar	
2018	Lincoln Red Imps	Europa	
2019	Lions Gibraltar	Lincoln Red Imps	
2020	Cancelled due to COVID-19 pandemic		
2021	Not held		
2021–22	Lions Gibraltar	Lynx	
2022–23	Lions Gibraltar	Lynx	
2024	Lions Gibraltar	Europa	
2024–25	Mons Calpe Gibraltar Wave	Lions Gibraltar	

=== Performance by club ===
Rank	Team	Titles	Last Title
1	Lions Gibraltar	4	2024
2	Lincoln Red Imps	3	2018
2	Manchester 62	3	2015
4	Mons Calpe Gibraltar Wave	1	2024–25

== National football stadium ==
Stadium	Capacity	City
Victoria Stadium	5,000	Gibraltar

- Europa Point Stadium and Estadio Algarve will be used temporarily during the redevelopment of Victoria Stadium.

== See also ==
- Sport in Gibraltar
