= Dahlia Salah =

Gibraltarian footballer

Personal information
- Full name: Dahlia Salah El-Din Farfan
- Date of birth: 31 May 2001 (age 25)
- Position: Defender

Team information
- Current team: Linense FCB
- Number: 8

Youth career
- Balón Linense
- Cádiz

Senior career*
Years	Team	Apps	(Gls)
2017–2018	Lincoln Red Imps	6	(2)
2018–2019	Ciudad de Algeciras	21	(14)
2021	Europa	0	(0)
2021–2024	Queens Park Rangers B	32	(10)
2024	Queens Park Rangers	2	(0)
2024–	Linense FCB	15	(8)

International career^{‡}
2021–	Gibraltar	11	(0)
- * Club domestic league appearances and goals as of 30 March 2025 ‡ National team caps and goals as of 25 February 2025

Dahlia Salah El-Din Farfan (born 31 May 2001) is a Gibraltarian footballer who plays as a defender for Linense FCB and the Gibraltar women's national team.

== Career ==
As a youth player, Salah joined the youth academy of Spanish side Balón Linense. In 2020 she joined the futsal side of Gibraltar Wave, before joining Europa football team for the end of the 2020–21 season. In summer 2021, she signed for Queens Park Rangers in England, initially playing for their B team in the Greater London Women's Football League. On 18 April 2024 she was named in a first team squad for the first time, appearing on the bench against Ashford Town (Middlesex) and coming on as a substitute in their Combined Counties Challenge Cup win. She subsequently made her FA Women's National League debut on 21 April, in a 2-2 draw with Chesham United.

== Futsal ==
Salah is also an active futsal player, winning the National Futsal Series with Bloomsbury Futsal Club in 2023.
