= Gibraltar women's national football team =

Women's national association football team representing Gibraltar

Gibraltar
- Association: Gibraltar Football Association
- Confederation: UEFA (Europe)
- Head coach: Stella Gotal
- Captain: Shania Robba
- Most caps: Joelle Gilbert (26)
- Top scorer: Joelle Gilbert (7)
- Home stadium: Europa Point Stadium; Victoria Stadium
- FIFA code: GIB
First colours	Second colours

FIFA ranking
- Current: 190 ▼1 (20 October 2026)
- Highest: 185 (December 2024 – August 2025)
- Lowest: 189 (December 2025 – Present)

First international
- Unofficial: Gibraltar 0–1 Andorra (Gibraltar; 1 July 2014); Official: Liechtenstein 4–1 Gibraltar (Ruggell, Liechtenstein; 24 June 2021)

Biggest win
- Gibraltar 1–0 Liechtenstein (Gibraltar; 26 November 2021)

Biggest defeat
- Gibraltar 0–12 Hungary (Gibraltar; 5 September 2022)

The Gibraltar women's national football team represents the British Overseas Territory of Gibraltar in international women's football. The Gibraltar Football Association is a member of UEFA and FIFA, and is yet to field a women's team in FIFA Women's World Cup or UEFA Women's Championship qualification. However they entered the UEFA Women's Nations League for the first time in the 2025 edition, marking their first official competitive tournament, which will lead to them entering qualification for the 2027 Women's World Cup. Prior to this, the team had largely been restricted to appearances at the biennial Island Games football tournaments, first appearing in the 2011 edition.

== History ==
Women's football is still in its infancy in Gibraltar, with only three teams participating in the Gibraltar Women's Football League in the 2018–19 season. However it has grown with 5 teams competing in 2021–22. In 2014, Gibraltar hosted a women's development tournament organised by UEFA, losing 1–0 in its first game to Andorra. The side lost all three games, against Andorra, Luxembourg and an Algarve XI. However, as a development tournament, these games are not recognised as full internationals.

Since then, Gibraltar's involvement in UEFA-sanctioned women's football has been limited to sending under-16 girls' teams to participate in development tournaments, most recently in Malta in 2019. In June 2021 the team made their debut in a full international, in a 4–1 defeat to Liechtenstein.

Since 2011 the Gibraltar women's team has taken part in the Island Games, and the players have yet to take part in a UEFA Women's Championship since their FA's admission into the organisation. However, in November 2021 it was announced that an under-19 team would be formed and entered into qualification for the 2023 UEFA Women's Under-19 Championship.

Gibraltar did not enter the inaugural UEFA Women's Nations League. However, they joined for the first time in October 2024, ahead of the 2025 edition, marking the women's team's first official competitive international tournament.

== Results and fixtures ==
The following is a list of match results in the last 12 months, as well as any future matches that have been scheduled.

Legend

Win Draw Lose Fixture

=== 2026 ===
3 March 2026 2027 FIFA Women's World Cup qualification	Kosovo	6–0	Gibraltar	Pristina, Kosovo
17:00	Biqkaj 4'; Sahiti 26'; Uka 63'; Memeti 72'; Fetaj 76', 87'	Report		Stadium: Fadil Vokrri Stadium; Attendance: 100; Referee: Oxana Cruc (Moldova)

7 March 2026 2027 FIFA Women's World Cup qualification	Gibraltar	0–5	Bulgaria	Europa Point, Gibraltar
19:00		Report	Borrell 2' (o.g.); Rasina 39'; Ivanova 84', 85'; Naydenova 90+4'	Stadium: Europa Point Stadium; Attendance: 361; Referee: Laura Mauricio (Switzerland)

14 April 2026 2027 FIFA Women's World Cup qualification	Gibraltar	0–1	Croatia	Europa Point, Gibraltar
19:00		Report	Kurkutović 38'	Stadium: Europa Point Stadium; Attendance: 251; Referee: Ines Andrada (Portugal)

18 April 2026 2027 FIFA Women's World Cup qualification	Croatia	9–0	Gibraltar	Sinj, Croatia
16:30	Čanjevac 38', 61'; Bakalar 42'; Vračević 58'; Rudelić 65', 87'; Kukavica 81'; Vlastelica 86'; Glibo 90'	Report		Stadium: Gradski stadion Referee: Zuzana Valentová (Slovakia)

5 June 2026 2027 FIFA Women's World Cup qualification	Bulgaria	3–1	Gibraltar	Sofia, Bulgaria
17:00	Yaneva 2'; Ferro 43' (o.g.); Petrova 70'	Report	Gilbert 89'	Stadium: Stadion Aleksandar Shalamanov; Referee: Irena Velevačkoska (North Macedonia)

9 June 2026 2027 FIFA Women's World Cup qualification	Gibraltar	0–8	Kosovo	Europa Point, Gibraltar
19:00		Report	Halilaj 3'; Memeti 7', 21'; Biqkaj 14'; Smaili 32', 76'; Uka 68'; Fetaj 84'	Stadium: Europa Point Stadium; Referee: Marisca Overtoom (Netherlands)

10 October Friendly	Liechtenstein	3–0	Gibraltar	Schaan, Liechtenstein
15:00	Göppel 6', 47'; Strunk 67'	Report		Stadium: Rheinwiese Stadion; Referee: Fabienne Hofer (Austria)

5 December Friendly	San Marino	v	Gibraltar

- Gibraltar Fixtures and Results – Soccerway.com

== Head-to-head record ==
The following table shows Gibraltar's all-time international record.

As of 10 October 2026

FIFA official "A" matches only

Opponent	P	W	D	L	GF	GA	GD	Win %	First	Last
Andorra	5	0	0	5	5	17	−12	0.00	2022	2025
Bulgaria	2	0	0	2	1	8	−7	0.00	2026	2026
Croatia	2	0	0	2	0	10	−10	0.00	2026	2026
Faroe Islands	3	0	0	3	0	7	−7	0.00	2022	2025
Hungary	1	0	0	1	0	12	−12	0.00	2022	2022
Kosovo	2	0	0	2	0	14	−14	0.00	2026	2026
Liechtenstein	7	1	1	5	8	16	−8	14.29	2021	2026
Moldova	2	0	0	2	0	5	−5	0.00	2025	2025
Panama	1	0	0	1	0	7	−7	0.00	2023	2023
Slovakia	2	0	0	2	0	19	−19	0.00	2025	2025
Total	27	1	1	25	14	115	−101	3.70	2021	2026

Unofficial match record

Opponent	P	W	D	L	GF	GA	GD	Win %	First	Last
(Portugal) Algarve FA	1	0	0	1	0	2	−2	0.00	2014	2014
Andorra	1	0	0	1	0	1	−1	0.00	2014	2014
Gotland	1	0	0	1	0	3	−3	0.00	2015	2015
Greenland	1	0	0	1	0	8	−8	0.00	2011	2011
Hitra	2	0	0	2	0	6	−6	0.00	2011	2017
Isle of Man	3	0	0	3	2	17	−15	0.00	2011	2019
Isle of Wight	1	0	0	1	1	8	−7	0.00	2017	2017
Jersey	2	0	0	2	2	12	−10	0.00	2017	2019
Luxembourg	1	0	0	1	0	3	−3	0.00	2014	2014
Western Isles	2	0	0	2	0	10	−10	0.00	2015	2019
Total	15	0	0	15	5	70	−65	0.00	2011	2019

== Coaching staff ==
=== Current coaching staff ===
As of 19 May 2026

Role	Name
Head coach	(Croatia) Stella Gotal
Assistant coach	(Italy) Matheus Vianna Scapin
Goalkeeper coach	(United States) Abby Baravik
Goalkeeper analyst	(Gibraltar) Kean Galia
Head physio Strength & Conditioning coach	(Gibraltar) Andrew Rodriguez
Team Manager	(Gibraltar) Arianne Risso

=== Manager history ===
Managers before 2019 are unknown. Matches before 2021 are not recognised by FIFA.

Up to date as of 10 October 2026

Manager	Nationality	Gibraltar career	Played	Won	Drawn	Lost	GF	GA	Win %
Steve Cummings	(Gibraltar)	2019	3	0	0	3	3	13	0.00
Janssen Olivero	(Gibraltar)	2020–2023	7	1	0	6	6	26	14.29
Scott Wiseman	(Gibraltar)	2023–2025	11	0	1	10	6	49	0.00
Stella Gotal	(Croatia)	2025–2026	8	0	0	8	2	37	0.00
Tiago Lina Da Costa (interim)	(Portugal)	2026–	1	0	0	1	0	0.00	

== Players ==
=== Current squad ===
The following players have been called up to the squad for the following friendly:

- Match date: 10 October 2026
- Opposition: Liechtenstein
- Caps and goals correct as of: 10 October 2026, after the match against Liechtenstein.

No.	Pos.	Player	Date of birth (age)	Caps	Goals	Club
	GK	Caitlin Robba	19 December 2001 (age 24)	13	0	Free Agent
	GK	Brooke Williams-Owen	20 May 2009 (age 17)	7	0	(The Football Association) Sheffield United
	DF	Charlyann Pizzarello	12 September 1997 (age 29)	25	1	(Royal Spanish Football Federation) Odisea
	DF	Andrya Rowbottom	29 March 1992 (age 34)	14	0	(Gibraltar Football Association) Lynx
	DF	Seleen Celecia	22 April 1998 (age 28)	9	0	(Gibraltar Football Association) Lynx
	DF	Alexandra Ambrosio	7 December 1997 (age 28)	8	0	(Gibraltar Football Association) Mons Calpe
	DF	Sarah Popham	18 April 2006 (age 20)	4	0	(The Football Association) Toby
	DF	Amber Victory	9 May 2009 (age 17)	2	0	(Gibraltar Football Association) Europa
	DF	Esme Cerisola	21 February 2010 (age 16)	1	0	(The Football Association) North Shields Athletic
	MF	Tiffany Viagas	25 July 2002 (age 24)	26	2	(Royal Spanish Football Federation) Cádiz B
	MF	Shania Robba (Captain)	19 December 2001 (age 24)	23	2	(Royal Spanish Football Federation) Algeciras FS B
	MF	Kayleigh Ferro	24 July 2001 (age 25)	20	0	(Gibraltar Football Association) Lynx
	MF	Tiana Borrell	29 October 1998 (age 28)	18	0	(Gibraltar Football Association) Lynx
	MF	Dahlia Salah	31 May 2001 (age 25)	11	0	Free Agent
	MF	Mara Todoran	3 April 2006 (age 20)	10	0	(The Football Association) Wallsend BC
	MF	Anna Howard	26 April 2006 (age 20)	4	0	(Football Association of Wales) Pontypridd United
	MF	Amal El Mokhalfi		0	0	(Gibraltar Football Association) GFA Girls
	FW	Caitlin Chapman	3 July 2003 (age 23)	14	0	(Football Association of Wales) The New Saints
	FW	Nicole Nash	15 September 2007 (age 19)	10	0	(Gibraltar Football Association) Lynx
	FW	Evelyn Bush	23 October 2008 (age 18)	7	0	(The Football Association) Notts County
	FW	Gianelle Hanglin	9 January 2003 (age 23)	3	0	(Gibraltar Football Association) Lynx
	FW	Julia De Los Santos		1	0	Free Agent
	FW	Jaydene Storey		1	0	(Royal Spanish Football Federation) Algeciras FS B

=== Recent call-ups ===
The following players have been called up to the Gibraltar squad in the past 12 months.

Pos.	Player	Date of birth (age)	Caps	Goals	Club	Latest call-up
GK	Jaylene Gaivizo	26 February 2003 (age 23)	0	0	(Gibraltar) Lynx	v. Kosovo, 9 June 2026
GK	Akisha Ferrell	29 January 2002 (age 24)	1	0	Free agent	v. Croatia, 18 April 2026
GK	Gianna Grech	24 May 1999 (age 27)	0	0	(Gibraltar) FC Magpies	Training camp, November 2025
DF	Maya Schilling	3 October 2007 (age 19)	16	0	(United States) West Alabama Tigers	v. Kosovo, 9 June 2026
DF	Talia Gilbert	28 April 1997 (age 29)	17	0	Free agent	v. Croatia, 18 April 2026
DF	Aimee Lawrence	26 February 2004 (age 22)	11	1	(England) Walmer Bridge	v. Croatia, 18 April 2026
DF	Paula Costa	19 April 2000 (age 26)	7	0	(Gibraltar) Lynx	v. Croatia, 18 April 2026
DF	Arianne Parody		0	0	(Gibraltar) College 1975	Training camp, November 2025
MF	Kathryn Rocca	3 June 1993 (age 33)	0	0	(Gibraltar) College 1975	v. Kosovo, 9 June 2026
MF	Julia Lima	10 November 2008 (age 18)	9	0	(Gibraltar) Lynx	v.Croatia, 18 April 2026
MF	Beau Reyes	24 July 2000 (age 26)	0	0	(Gibraltar) FC Magpies	Training camp, November 2025
FW	Joelle Gilbert	9 September 1999 (age 27)	26	7	Free Agent	v. Kosovo, 9 June 2026
FW	Naomi Victor	15 August 1998 (age 28)	25	0	(Spain) Algeciras FS B	v. Kosovo, 9 June 2026
FW	Macey Twigger	13 July 2010 (age 16)	0	0	(Gibraltar) College 1975	v. Kosovo, 9 June 2026
FW	Mara Alvez	24 August 2007 (age 19)	4	0	(England) Liverpool Feds	Training camp, November 2025
FW	Karima Gracia	19 May 1999 (age 27)	1	0	(Gibraltar) Lynx	Training camp, November 2025

== Records and statistics ==
- Gibraltar player sent off: (2 times)
  - Chelsea Grech, v Moldova, 3 June 2025 (90th minute)
  - Seleen Celecia, v Bulgaria, 7 March 2026 (90+2nd minute)
- Opponent player sent off: Fiona Batliner, v Liechtenstein, 26 November 2021 (74th minute)
- Longest losing streak: 15: from 23 October 2024 to present
- Longest winless streak: 22: from 29 November 2021 to present
- Longest goalless streak: 482 minutes: from 26 October 2024 to 25 October 2025
- Most consecutive minutes without conceding a goal: 154 minutes: from 27 June 2021 to 29 November 2021
- Longest goalless streak by both teams: 149 minutes: from 27 June 2021 to 29 November 2021
- Longest streak without a red cards: 17: from 24 June 2021 to 30 May 2025
- Longest streak without a red cards by a opponent: 23: from 29 November 2021 to present
- Most appearance: 26: Joelle Gilbert, from 24 June 2021 to present
- Most consecutive appearance: 26: Joelle Gilbert, from 24 June 2021 to present
- Top goalscorer: 7: Joelle Gilbert, from 24 June 2021 to present
- Most goals in one calendar year: 3: Joelle Gilbert, 2024
- Most consecutive international matches scoring: 2: (2 times)
  - Joelle Gilbert, from 29 November 2021 to 16 February 2022
  - Tiffany Viagas, from 23 October 2024 to 26 October 2024
- Most goals in against one team: 4: Joelle Gilbert, v Liechtenstein, from 24 June 2021 to present
- Biggest wins: 1: v Liechtenstein, 26 November 2021
- Biggest defeat: 12: v Hungary, 5 September 2022
- First goal scored: Shania Robba, v Liechtenstein, 24 June 2021
- Most goals scored by a player in a match: 1: (14 times)
- Most goals scored by a opponent player in a match: 4: (2 times)
  - Dóra Zeller, v Hungary, 5 September 2022
  - Tamara Morávková, v Slovakia, 30 May 2025
- Most goals scored in a match: 2: (3 times)
  - v Liechtenstein, 29 November 2021
  - v Liechtenstein, 22 February 2024
  - v Andorra, 26 October 2024
- Most goals scored in first half: 1: (5 times)
- Most goals scored in second half: 1: (9 times)
- Most goals conceded in a match: 12: v Hungary, 5 September 2022
- Most goals conceded in first half: 7: v Hungary, 5 September 2022
- Most goals conceded in second half: 7: v Croatia, 18 April 2026
- Most goals by both teams in a match: 12: v Hungary, 5 September 2022
- Most goals by both teams in first half: 7: v Hungary, 5 September 2022
- Most goals by both teams in second half: 7: v Croatia, 18 April 2026
- Fewest goals by both teams in a match: 1: (5 times)
  - v Liechtenstein, 26 November 2021
  - v Faroe Islands, 20 February 2022
  - v Moldova, 21 February 2025
  - v Faroe Islands, 25 February 2025
  - v Croatia, 14 April 2026
- Fastest goal: 21 minute and 43 seconds: Aimee Lawrence, v Andorra, 25 October 2025
- Fastest goal by a opponent: 2nd minute: (3 times)
  - 72 seconds: Tiana Borrell, v Bulgaria, 7 March 2026 (Own goal)
  - 73 seconds: Nikola Rybanská, v Slovakia, 30 May 2025
  - 2nd minute: Aleksandra Yaneva, v Bulgaria, 5 June 2026
- Fastest 2 goals to start the match: 59 minute and 18 seconds: v Andorra, 26 October 2024
- Fastest 2 goals conceded to start the match: 6 minute and 31 seconds: v Kosovo, 9 June 2026

== Competitive record ==
=== FIFA Women's World Cup ===
FIFA Women's World Cup record								Qualification record							
Year	Round	P	W	D	L	GF	GA	P	W	D	L	GF	GA	P/R	Rnk
1991–2011	Team did not exist							Team did not exist							
(Canada) 2015	Not a FIFA member							Not a FIFA member							
(France) 2019	Did not enter							Did not enter							
(Australia) (New Zealand) 2023	Did not enter							Did not enter							
(Brazil) 2027	In progress							0	0	0	0	0	0	TBD	
(Costa Rica) (Jamaica) (Mexico) (United States) 2031	To be determined							To be determined							
(United Kingdom) 2035	To be determined							To be determined							
Total	0/3	–	–	–	–	–	–	–	–	–	–	–	–	–	

=== UEFA Women's Euro ===
UEFA Women's Championship record								Qualification record							
Year	Round	P	W	D	L	GF	GA	P	W	D	L	GF	GA	P/R	Rnk
1984–2009	Team did not exist							Team did not exist							
(Sweden) 2013	Not a UEFA member							Not a UEFA member							
(Netherlands) 2017	Did not enter							Did not enter							
(England) 2022	Did not enter							Did not enter							
(Switzerland) 2025	Did not enter							Did not enter							
(Germany) 2029	To be determined							To be determined							
Total	0/4	–	–	–	–	–	–	–	–	–	–	–	–	–	

=== UEFA Women's Nations League ===
UEFA Women's Nations League record
Year	Lg	Gp	Pos	P	W	D	L	GF	GA	P/R	Rnk
2023–24	Did not enter										
2025	C	1	4th	6	0	0	6	0	30	Same position	53
Total				–	–	–	–	–	–	–	

▲	Promoted at end of season
Same position	No movement at end of season
▼	Relegated at end of season
*	Participated in promotion/relegation play-offs

=== Island Games ===
Year	Round	Position	GP	W	D	L	GS	GA
1989–1999	No women's tournament							
2001–2013	Did not enter							
(Jersey) 2015	Group Stage	11	3	0	0	3	1	14
(Gotland) 2017	9th Place Match	10	3	0	0	3	1	15
(Gibraltar) 2019	Replaced by 2019 Inter Games Football Tournament							
(Guernsey) 2023	Did not enter							
(Orkney) 2025	Did not enter							
(Faroe Islands) 2027	To be determined							
(Isle of Man) 2029	To be determined							
Total	2/13	0 Titles	6	0	0	6	2	29

== Player records ==
As of 10 October 2026

=== Most capped ===
#	Name	Career	Caps	Goals
1	Joelle Gilbert	2021–	26	7
1	Tiffany Viagas	2021–	26	2
3	Charlyann Pizzarello	2021–	25	1
3	Naomi Victor	2021–	25	0
5	Shania Robba	2021–	23	2
6	Kayleigh Ferro	2021–	20	0
7	Tiana Borrell	2021–	18	0
8	Talia Gilbert	2023–	17	0
9	Maya Schilling	2024–	16	0
10	Andrya Rowbottom	2021–	14	0
10	Caitlin Chapman	2025–	14	0

=== Most goals ===
Players with an equal number of goals are ranked in order of average.

#	Name	Career	Caps	Goals	Average
1	**Joelle Gilbert**	2021–	26	7	0.269
2	**Shania Robba**	2021–	23	2	0.087
2	**Tiffany Viagas**	2021–	26	2	0.077
4	**Aimee Lawrence**	2024–	11	1	0.091
4	Reighann Olivero	2021–2025	13	1	0.077
4	**Charlyann Pizzarello**	2021–	25	1	0.04

=== Captains ===
#	Player	Career	Captain Caps	Total Caps
1	**Shania Robba**	2021–	17	23
2	**Keshia Doody**	2021–	4	6
3	**Tiffany Viagas**	2021–	2	24
4	**Joelle Gilbert**	2021–	2	25
5	Alexandra Holt	2021	2	2

=== Goalkeepers ===
#	Player	Career	Games	Wins	GA	GAA
1	**Caitlin Robba**	2024–	13	0	56	4.308
2	Kyrelle Revagliatte	2021–2024	8	1	33	4.125
3	**Brooke Williams-Owen**	2024–	7	0	26	3.714
4	**Chelsea Grech**	2025–	1	0	0	0

- **^1** Players in **bold** are still actively competing and are available for selection

== See also ==
- Sport in Gibraltar
  - Football in Gibraltar
    - Women's football in Gibraltar
- Gibraltar women's national futsal team
- Gibraltar men's national football team
