= LGFC =

LGFC may refer to:

- Leverstock Green F.C., an English football club
- Lions Gibraltar F.C., a Gibraltarian men's football club
- Lions Gibraltar F.C. Women, a Gibraltarian women's football club
