= 2020–21 Gibraltar Women's Football League =

Gibraltar Women's Football League
- Season: 2020–21
- Dates: 8 December 2020 – 8 June 2021
- Champions: Lions Gibraltar (2nd title)
- Matches played: 5
- Goals scored: 23 (4.6 per match)
- Top goalscorer: (Gibraltar) Mara Todoran (5 goals)
- Best goalkeeper: (Gibraltar) Zamara Espinosa (2 clean sheets)
- Biggest home win: Lions Gibraltar 3–0 Lynx (15 December 2020)
- Biggest away win: Europa 0–2 Lions Gibraltar (8 December 2020)
- Highest scoring: Lynx 5–5 Europa (25 May 2021)
- All statistics correct as of 6 June 2021.

The 2020–21 Gibraltar Women's Football League is the fifth season of 11-a-side women's football in Gibraltar since the territory joined UEFA in 2013, and FIFA in 2016. The league had been in operation for a number of years previously, but teams were ineligible for entry to the UEFA Women's Champions League as it was only a 9-a-side tournament. Lincoln Red Imps Women were the reigning champions, but disbanded their women's team in summer 2020.

After only two games, the league paused on 15 December 2020, before resuming on 25 May 2021. While the first two games of the season were played at Victoria Stadium, resurfacing at the ground meant that the restarted league was played on pitch at the Devil's Tower Camp, with permission from Gibraltar's Ministry of Defence.

== Teams ==
Lincoln Red Imps disbanded their women's team in summer 2020, with Lynx replacing them. Europa Point had initially declared their intention to form a team this year, but the COVID-19 pandemic halted their plans.

Note: Flags indicate national team as has been defined under FIFA eligibility rules. Players may hold more than one non-FIFA nationality.

Team	Manager	Captain	Kit manufacturer	Club sponsor
Europa	(Gibraltar) Gayle Langtry		Kappa	
Lions Gibraltar	(Gibraltar) Janssen Olivero	(Gibraltar) Andrya Rowbottom	Macron	
Lynx	(Gibraltar) Col Griffiths	(Gibraltar) Isabella Laguea	Givova	Grupo Casais

== League table ==
Pos	Team	Pld	W	D	L	GF	GA	GD	Pts	Qualification
1	Lions Gibraltar (C)	3	2	1	0	7	2	+5	7	Possible Champions League preliminary round
2	Europa	4	1	2	1	10	10	0	5	
3	Lynx	3	0	1	2	6	11	−5	1	

Updated to match(es) played on 6 June 2021. Source:
Rules for classification: 1) points; 2) goal difference; 3) number of goals scored.
(C) Champions

== Results ==
Home \ Away	EFC	LGI	LYN
Europa		0–2	3–1
Lions Gibraltar	2–2		3–0
Lynx	5–5	8 Jun	

Updated to match(es) played on 6 June 2021. Source: Gibraltar FA
Legend: Blue = home team win; Yellow = draw; Red = away team win.

== Season statistics ==
=== Top scorers ===
Rank	Player	Club	Goals
1	(Gibraltar) Mara Todoran	Europa	5
2	(Gibraltar) Mollie Karp	Lions Gibraltar	3
2	(Gibraltar) Tiffany Viagas	Lynx	3
2	(Gibraltar) Akisha Ferrell	Europa	3
5	(Gibraltar) Joelle Gilbert	Lions Gibraltar	2
6	(Spain) Ines Cestau Léon	Europa	1
6	(Gibraltar) Paula Costa	Europa	1
6	(Gibraltar) Sophia Brinkman	Lions Gibraltar	1
6	(Gibraltar) Kayleigh Ferro	Lions Gibraltar	1
6	(Spain) Laura Cortés Minan	Lynx	1
6	(Gibraltar) Noelle Laguea	Lynx	1
6	(Gibraltar) Naomi Victor	Lynx	1

==== Hat-tricks ====
Player	For	Against	Result	Date
(Gibraltar) Tiffany Viagas	Lynx	Europa	5–5 (H)	25 May 2021

=== Clean sheets ===
Rank	Player	Club	Clean sheets
1	(Gibraltar) Zamara Espinosa	Lions Gibraltar	2
