= 2017–18 Gibraltar Women's Football League =

Gibraltar Women's Football League
- Season: 2017–18
- Matches: 7
- Goals: 32 (4.57 per match)
- Top goalscorer: Laura Cortes-Minan (7 goals)
- Best goalkeeper: Kyrelle Revagliatte (3 clean sheets)
- Biggest home win: Lions Gibraltar Women 5–0 Europa Women (21 October 2017)
- Biggest away win: Europa Women 0–7 Lions Gibraltar Women (25 November 2017)
- Highest scoring: Europa Women 0–7 Lions Gibraltar Women (25 November 2017)

The 2017–18 Gibraltar Women's Football League is the first season of 11-a-side women's football in Gibraltar since the territory joined UEFA in 2013, and FIFA in 2016. The league had been in operation for a number of years previously, but teams were ineligible for entry to the UEFA Women's Champions League as it was only a 9-a-side tournament. Lincoln Red Imps Women were the reigning champions.

== Teams ==
Manchester 62 Women withdrew during the 2016–17 season and did not re-enter. As a result, this season saw only three teams participate.

- Europa Women
- Lincoln Red Imps Women
- Lions Gibraltar Women

== League table ==
Pos	Team	Pld	W	D	L	GF	GA	GD	Pts	Qualification
1	Lincoln Red Imps Women	4	4	0	0	15	1	+14	12	Possible 2018–19 UEFA Women's Champions League
2	Lions Gibraltar Women	5	3	0	2	17	7	+10	9	
3	Europa Women	5	0	0	5	0	24	−24	0	

Updated to match(es) played on 17 February 2018. Source:
Rules for classification: 1) points; 2) goal difference; 3) number of goals scored.

=== Top scorers ===
Rank	Player	Club	Goals
1	(Spain) Laura Cortes-Minan	Lincoln Red Imps	7
2	(Gibraltar) Mollie Karp	Lions Gibraltar	4
3	(Gibraltar) Kayleigh Ferro	Lions Gibraltar	3
3	(Gibraltar) Joelle Marie Gilbert	Lions Gibraltar	3
5	(Gibraltar) Kathryn Ann Rocca	Lions Gibraltar	2
5	(Gibraltar) Shania Robba	Lincoln Red Imps	2
5	(Spain) Alba Martin	Lions Gibraltar	2
8	(Algeria) El-Din	Lincoln Red Imps	1
8	(Gibraltar) Dyandra Duarte	Lincoln Red Imps	1
8	(Gibraltar) Holt	Lincoln Red Imps	1
8	(Gibraltar) Zoe Ballantine	Lions Gibraltar	1
8	(Gibraltar) Keshia Doody	Lions Gibraltar	1
8	(Peru) Barriga Diaz	Lincoln Red Imps	1
8	(Italy) Cereto-Almida	Lincoln Red Imps	1
