= Caitlin Chapman =

British footballer

Personal information
- Date of birth: 3 July 2003 (age 23)
- Positions: Midfielder; forward

Team information
- Current team: The New Saints
- Number: 17

Youth career
- –2021: Stoke City

Senior career*
Years	Team	Apps	(Gls)
2019–2020	Stoke City Development	7	(2)
2021–	The New Saints	91	(34)

International career^{‡}
2020	Northern Ireland U19		
2025–	Gibraltar	14	(0)
- * Club domestic league appearances and goals as of 1 November 2026 ‡ National team caps and goals as of 10 October 2026

Caitlin Chapman (born 3 July 2003) is a British footballer who currently plays as a midfielder or forward for The New Saints. Formerly a youth international for Northern Ireland, she currently represents Gibraltar at international level.

== Club career ==
Chapman came through the youth system at Stoke City, playing for their development team in the 2019–20 West Midlands Regional Football League season before it was abandoned due to the COVID-19 pandemic. She joined The New Saints in 2021, when they reformed their women's team in the Adran Premier. She won her first silverware in February 2024 when TNS won the Adran Trophy.

== International career ==
Chapman was called up to the Northern Ireland U19s for the first time in February 2020, at the age of 16. In November 2024, she was called up to the Gibraltar squad for the first time, for a training camp in Germany and the Netherlands. She made her full debut in the 2025 UEFA Women's Nations League game against Moldova on 21 February 2025, the country's first competitive game in women's football.

== Career statistics ==
=== International ===
As of match played 10 October 2026.

Appearances and goals by national team and year
National team	Year	Apps	Goals
Gibraltar
Gibraltar	2025	7	0
Gibraltar	2026	7	0
Total		14	0

== Honours ==
With The New Saints

- Adran Trophy: 2024–25
