= Kyrelle Revagliatte =

Gibraltarian footballer

Personal information
- Full name: Kyrelle Joelle Revagliatte
- Date of birth: 4 August 1993 (age 33)
- Place of birth: Gibraltar
- Position: Goalkeeper

Team information
- Current team: Mons Calpe
- Number: 9

Senior career*
Years	Team	Apps	(Gls)
–2014	Lions Gibraltar (Note: Stats before 2014–15 season unknown)		
2014–2020	Lions Gibraltar	41	(0)
2020–2022	Esteponense	20	(0)
2022	Torreón Cala Mijas	2	(0)
2022–2024	Estepona	31	(0)
2024	Algeciras	3	(0)
2024–2025	Lions Gibraltar	8	(1)
2025–	Mons Calpe	1	(0)

International career^{‡}
2021–2023	Gibraltar	8	(0)
- * Club domestic league appearances and goals as of 24 March 2025 ‡ National team caps and goals as of 26 June 2023

Kyrelle Joelle Revagliatte (born 4 August 1993) is a Gibraltarian footballer who plays as a goalkeeper for Mons Calpe and the Gibraltar women's national team.

== Club career ==
After spending the majority of her career at Lions Gibraltar & Algeciras, Revagliatte moved to Spain in 2020 to sign for the newly formed 4th tier side ADC Esteponense. In April 2022 she departed Esteponense and joined league rivals Torreón Cala Mijas, registering an assist on her debut, a 4-1 Copa de Andalucia win over Marbella Promesas. That summer, she moved again to Estepona.

In March 2024 she left Estepona after 2 years at the club, moving to Algeciras.

== International career ==
Revagliatte made her senior debut for Gibraltar on 24 June 2021 in a 1–4 friendly away loss to Liechtenstein.

== Career statistics ==
=== International ===
As of 26 June 2023

Gibraltar
Year	Apps	Goals
2021	4	0
2022	3	0
2023	1	0
Total	8	0
