= Manchester 62 F.C. Women =

Association football club in Gibraltar

Manchester 62 FC Women
- Full name: Manchester 62 Football Club Women
- Nickname(s): The Red Devils of Gibraltar
- Founded: 1999 (earliest known); 2005; 2021 (current incarnation)
- Ground: Victoria Stadium
- Capacity: 5000
- Chairman: Michael Anton Monsour
- Manager: Jamie McDonough
- League: Gibraltar Women's Football League
- 2021–22: 5th
- Website: http://www.manchester62fc.com/
Home colours	Away colours	Third colours

Manchester 62 Football Club Women is an amateur association football club in Gibraltar, currently playing in the Gibraltar Women's Football League. The club is affiliated to Manchester 62.

== History ==
The earliest known record of Manchester 62's women's team is in the 1999 season of the Gibraltar Women's Football League, with the league seemingly abandoned with the Red Devils, top of the league. After a six-year absence, the team returned in 2005, remaining involved in the league for 11 years before folding during the 2016–17 season.

On the eve of the 2021–22 Gibraltar Women's Football League season, it was revealed that Manchester 62 would return to senior football after 5 years. Fielding a young side built from the club's youth teams, they lost on their return 9-0 against another new entry to the league, Gibraltar Wave.

== Honours ==
Gibraltar Women's Football League

- Winners: 2005, 2006, 2007–08, 2015–16
- Runners-up: 2007, 2010–11, 2012–13, 2013–14, 2014–15

Women's Rock Cup

- Winners: 2013, 2014, 2015

== Current squad ==
Note: Flags indicate national team as defined under FIFA eligibility rules; some limited exceptions apply. Players may hold more than one non-FIFA nationality.

No.	Pos.	Nation	Player
2		(Gibraltar) GIB	Faye Jones
4		(Gibraltar) GIB	Nicola Asquez
6		(Gibraltar) GIB	Samantha Machin
7	FW	(Gibraltar) GIB	Tiana Garcia
9		(Gibraltar) GIB	Sandy Peralta
11		(Spain) ESP	Amber Mata
12		(Spain) ESP	Corima Del Valle
13	GK	(Gibraltar) GIB	Gianara Vassallo

No.	Pos.	Nation	Player
14		(Gibraltar) GIB	Abigail Evans (captain)
15		(Nepal) NEP	Pratibha Kumal
18		(Gibraltar) GIB	Angel Brayson
21		(Gibraltar) GIB	Fatima Zahrae Ech Chalh
25		(Gibraltar) GIB	Genella Corbacho
26		(Gibraltar) GIB	Jayann Mendez
31		(Gibraltar) GIB	Angelika Bosco
—		(Gibraltar) GIB	Zenobia Jones
