= Tiffany Viagas =

Gibraltarian footballer

Personal information
- Date of birth: 25 July 2002 (age 24)
- Place of birth: Gibraltar
- Position: Midfielder

Team information
- Current team: Cádiz B
- Number: 5

Youth career
- Lincoln Red Imps

Senior career*
Years	Team	Apps	(Gls)
2015–2020	Lincoln Red Imps	55	(17)
2021	Lynx	2	(3)
2021–2024	Liverpool Feds	6	(0)
2023	→ Merseyrail (loan)	6	(0)
2024–	Cádiz B	20	(6)

International career^{‡}
2021–	Gibraltar	26	(2)
- * Club domestic league appearances and goals as of 15 November 2026 ‡ National team caps and goals as of 10 October 2026

Tiffany Viagas (born 25 July 2002) is a Gibraltarian footballer who plays as a midfielder for Cádiz B and the Gibraltar women's national team.

== Club career ==
Coming through the youth ranks at Lincoln Red Imps, Viagas had trials with Everton, FC Twente and Liverpool before heading to Liverpool John Moores University in 2020. Returning to Gibraltar in March 2021, she briefly signed for Lynx before joining FA Women's National League side Liverpool Feds in July 2021. In February 2023, she joined Merseyrail on an agreement to the end of the season.

== International career ==
Viagas made her senior debut for Gibraltar on 24 June 2021 in a 1–4 friendly away loss to Liechtenstein.

== Career statistics ==
=== International ===
As of 10 October 2026

Gibraltar
Year	Apps	Goals
2021	4	0
2022	3	0
2023	1	0
2024	4	2
2025	7	0
2026	7	0
Total	26	2

==== International goals ====
Gibraltar score listed first, score column indicates score after each Gilbert goal.

International goals by date, venue, cap, opponent, score, result and competition
No.	Date	Venue	Cap	Opponent	Score	Result	Competition
1	23 October 2024	Europa Point Stadium, Europa Point, Gibraltar	11	Andorra	1–3	1–4	Friendly
2	26 October 2024	Europa Point Stadium, Europa Point, Gibraltar	12	Andorra	2–3	2–4	Friendly
