= Gibraltar Women's Football League =

- Country: Gibraltar
- Confederation: UEFA
- Number of clubs: 6
- Domestic cup: Women's Rock Cup
- International cup: UEFA Champions League
- Current champions: Mons Calpe (1st title) (2025–26)
- Most championships: Lions Gibraltar; 7 titles)
- Website: Official website
- Current: 2026–27 Gibraltar Women's Football League

The Gibraltar Women's Football League is the top level amateur women's football championship of Gibraltar. Due to the lack of resources available for women's football, the league has been contested by five teams since 2021, and the league is treated as a development competition. This status means that, as of the 2021 season, clubs are ineligible to enter the UEFA Women's Champions League.

== History ==
The earliest known record of the competition dates back to 1999, when three teams (Manchester United, Lions and Victoria United) took part. However, the league was seemingly abandoned mid-season with Manchester United top of the table. After that, the league was not held for several years, aside from an edition held in 2003 between five middle schools. The league was revived fully in 2005, with Manchester United winning the title. Aside from 2008 to 2010, and the 2011–12 season, the league has been held every year since with a fluctuating number of teams - generally between 3 and 5, with a high of 8 teams participating in 2007. The Women's Rock Cup was introduced in 2013, generally played in the post-season.

== Format ==
As of the 2021–22 season, teams play each other 3 times. With the league only having development status, players as young as 12 are permitted to play and the league has been known to permit roll-on substitutes. As a result, teams are ineligible to qualify for the UEFA Women's Champions League. Each club is permitted to sign up to 3 overseas players without home-grown player status.

== 2026–2027 Teams ==
The 2026–2027 season is set to be played by the following give teams. All matches are played at Lathbury Barracks and Europa Sports Park while Victoria Stadium is rebuilt.

- College 1975
- GFA Girls
- Lynx
- FC Magpies
- Mons Calpe

== List of champions ==
Senior champions of the last year. The years before only school championships or five-a-side tournaments were held.

List of Gibraltar Women's Football League champions
Season	Champion	Runner up	Notes
1999	Abandoned		
2003	Bishop Fitzgerald Middle School	St Anne's Middle School	Played by school teams
2004	Not held		
2005	Manchester United	St Joseph's	
2006	Manchester United	Wolves	
2007	St. Joseph's	Manchester United	
2007–08	Manchester United	St Joseph's	
2008–09	Not held		
2009–10	Abandoned		
2010–11	Gibraltar United	Manchester United	
2011–12	Not held		
2012–13	College Cosmos	Manchester United	
2013–14	Lions Gibraltar	Manchester 62	9-a-side
2014–15	Lions Gibraltar	Manchester 62	9-a-side
2015–16	Manchester 62	Lincoln Red Imps	9-a-side
2016–17	Lincoln Red Imps	Lions Gibraltar	
2017–18	Lincoln Red Imps	Lions Gibraltar	
2018–19	Lincoln Red Imps	Lions Gibraltar	
2019–20	Lincoln Red Imps	Lions Gibraltar	
2020–21	Lions Gibraltar	Europa	
2021–22	Lions Gibraltar	Europa	
2022–23	Lions Gibraltar	Europa	
2023–24	Lions Gibraltar	Europa	
2024–25	Lions Gibraltar	GFA Girls	
2025–26	Mons Calpe	College 1975	

Note: 2013–14 season was played as a nine-a-side league to encourage more clubs to register a team. 2014–15 and 2015–16 were nine-a-side as well.

== Performance by club ==
Bold indicates club still playing in top division.

Rank	Team	Titles	Last title
1	**Lions Gibraltar**	7	2024–25
2	Lincoln Red Imps	4	2019–20
2	Manchester 62	4	2015–16
4	**Mons Calpe**	1	2025–26
4	College Cosmos	1	2012–13
4	Gibraltar United	1	2010–11
4	St Joseph's	1	2007
4	Bishop Fitzgerald Middle School	1	2003
