= Joelle Gilbert =

Gibraltarian footballer (born 1999)

Personal information
- Full name: Joelle Marie Gilbert
- Date of birth: 9 September 1999 (age 27)
- Place of birth: Gibraltar
- Positions: Midfielder; forward

Team information
- Current team: Lynx
- Number: 26

Youth career
- Lincoln Red Imps

Senior career*
Years	Team	Apps	(Gls)
2015–2018	Lions Gibraltar	26	(18)
2018–2019	Cardiff Met. Ladies		
2019–2023	Lions Gibraltar	28	(31)
2023–2026	Linense FCB	48	(67)
2026–	Lynx	3	(2)

International career^{‡}
2021–	Gibraltar	26	(7)
- * Club domestic league appearances and goals as of 12 March 2026 ‡ National team caps and goals as of 9 June 2026

Joelle Marie Gilbert (born 9 September 1999) is a Gibraltarian footballer who plays as a midfielder for Lynx and the Gibraltar women's national team.

== International career ==
Gilbert made her senior debut for Gibraltar on 24 June 2021 in a 1–4 friendly away loss to Liechtenstein. She scored her first international goal against the same opposition 3 days later, in a 2–1 defeat.

== Career statistics ==
=== International ===
As of 9 June 2026

Gibraltar
Year	Apps	Goals
2021	4	2
2022	3	1
2023	1	0
2024	4	3
2025	8	0
2026	6	1
Total	26	7

==== International goals ====
Gibraltar score listed first, score column indicates score after each Gilbert goal.

International goals by date, venue, cap, opponent, score, result and competition
No.	Date	Venue	Cap	Opponent	Score	Result	Competition
1	27 June 2021	Freizeitpark Widau, Ruggell, Liechtenstein	2	Liechtenstein	1–2	1–2	Friendly
2	29 November 2021	Victoria Stadium, Gibraltar	4	Liechtenstein	2–3	2–3	Friendly
3	16 February 2022	Estadi Nacional, Andorra la Vella, Andorra	5	Andorra	1–4	1–4	Friendly
4	22 February 2024	Victoria Stadium, Gibraltar	9	Liechtenstein	2–3	2–3	Friendly
5	25 February 2024	Victoria Stadium, Gibraltar	10	Liechtenstein	1–0	1–1	Friendly
6	26 October 2024	Europa Point Stadium, Europa Point, Gibraltar	12	Andorra	1–2	2–4	Friendly
7	5 June 2026	Stadion Aleksandar Shalamanov, Sofia, Bulgaria	25	Bulgaria	1–3	1–3	2027 FIFA Women's World Cup qualification

== Other sports ==
Gilbert has also competed in athletics and basketball for Gibraltar, first representing the athletics team at the 2015 Island Games. At the 2015 Games, Gilbert placed 6th in her 100 metres heat in 13.32 and failed to advance to the finals.
