= Lions Gibraltar F.C. Women =

Association football club in Gibraltar

Lions Gibraltar
- Full name: Lions Gibraltar Football Club Women
- Short name: Lions
- Founded: 1999 (earliest known); 2007; 2010; 2013 (current incarnation)
- Ground: Victoria Stadium, Winston Churchill Avenue Gibraltar
- Capacity: 5000
- President: Alexander Grech
- Manager: Zamara Espinosa
- League: Gibraltar Women's Football League
- 2024–25: 1st
- Website: http://www.lionsgibraltarfc.com/
Home colours	Away colours

Lions Gibraltar Football Club Women is an amateur football club in Gibraltar, currently playing in the Gibraltar Women's Football League. The club is affiliated to Lions Gibraltar.

== History ==
The earliest known incarnation of Lions women competed in the 1999 season of the Gibraltar Women's Football League, although records before then are not known. After an 8-year absence from women's football the team returned, competing in the 2007 Women's League after merging with Tunnel Tigers, during which time they competed as Lions Tunnel Tigers. However, after finishing bottom of the league that season, the team quickly folded. The club returned as an independent entity in 2010, again finishing bottom of the league as Gibraltar United's women's team won the league, however the 2011 merger of the two men's teams also saw the women's teams merging after another hiatus from the league, returning in 2013 under its current incarnation and winning the league on their first attempt. The emergence of Lincoln Red Imps the following season saw Lions' brief control of the league quickly dissipate, until Lincoln's side folded in 2020.

== Honours ==
Gibraltar Women's Football League

- Winners: 2013–14, 2014–15, 2020–21, 2021–22, 2022–23, 2023–24, 2024–25
- Runners-up: 2016–17, 2017–18, 2018–19, 2020

Women's Rock Cup

- Winners: 2019, 2021–22, 2022–23, 2024
- Runners-up: 2015, 2016, 2017, 2024–25

== Current squad ==
Correct as of 25 September 2024.

Note: Flags indicate national team as defined under FIFA eligibility rules; some limited exceptions apply. Players may hold more than one non-FIFA nationality.

No.	Pos.	Nation	Player
1	GK	GIB	Rebecca Benggio
3	MF	GIB	Isabella Laguea
5	DF	GIB	Abigail Evans
6	DF	GIB	Kayleigh Tellez
8	FW	GIB	Mara Alvez
10	DF	GIB	Seleen Celecia
11	MF	GIB	Renai Marcus
12	MF	GIB	Zoe Payas
13	GK	GIB	Gianna Grech

No.	Pos.	Nation	Player
14		ENG	Bryony Harper
15	DF	GIB	Andrya Rowbottom (captain)
17	DF	GIB	Erin Saxby
18		RUS	Betina Kostadinova
19		ESP	Úrsula-Jimena Navarro
22		GIB	Janelle Porro
32	FW	GIB	Karima Garcia
34	DF	GIB	Zamara Espinosa
