= 2016–17 Gibraltar Women's Football League =

Gibraltar Women's Football League
- Season: 2016–17
- Champions: Lincoln Red Imps
- Top goalscorer: Joelle Marie Gilbert (10 goals)

The 2016–17 Gibraltar Women's Football League is the first season of 11-a-side women's football in Gibraltar since the territory joined UEFA in 2013, and FIFA in 2016. The league had been in operation for a number of years previously, but teams were ineligible for entry to the UEFA Women's Champions League as it was only a 9-a-side tournament. Manchester 62 were the reigning champions.

Lincoln Red Imps won the title. They did not enter the 2017–18 UEFA Women's Champions League though.

== Teams ==
Glacis United stopped participating after the 2015–16 season.

- Europa Ladies
- Lincoln Ladies
- Lions Gibraltar Ladies
- Manchester 62 Ladies

== League table ==
Manchester 62 apparently withdrew mid-season.

Pos	Team	Pld	W	D	L	Pts	Qualification
1	Lincoln Red Imps Women (C)	12	11	0	1	33	2017–18 UEFA Women's Champions League
2	Lions Gibraltar Women	12	7	1	4	22	
3	Europa Women	12	1	1	10	4	
4	Manchester 62 Women	6	1	0	5	3	

Updated to match(es) played on 2 March 2017. Source:
(C) Champions
