= Europa F.C. Women =

Association football club in Gibraltar

Europa FC
- Full name: Europa Football Club
- Nickname: The Green Machine
- Founded: 2013 (as College Europa Women)
- Ground: Victoria Stadium, Gibraltar
- Capacity: 5,000
- Chairman: Peter Cabezutto
- Manager: Gayle Langtry
- League: Gibraltar Women's Football League
- 2023–24: 2nd
- Website: http://www.europafc.gi
Home colours	Away colours

Europa FC Women is a women's football club from Gibraltar which plays in the Gibraltar Women's Football League. As with all other clubs in the territory, Europa FC currently shares the Victoria Stadium on Winston Churchill Avenue, with matches in the Women's League generally taking place in Victoria Stadium. The side are connected to Europa in the Gibraltar National League.

==History==.

== Honours ==
Gibraltar Women's Football League

- Runners-up: 2020–21, 2021–22, 2022–23

Women's Rock Cup

- Runners-up: 2018

== Current squad ==
Note: Flags indicate national team as defined under FIFA eligibility rules; some limited exceptions apply. Players may hold more than one non-FIFA nationality.

No.	Pos.	Nation	Player
1	GK	GIB	Gianna Grech
2	DF	GIB	Arianne Parody
3	DF	GIB	Sarah Popham
4	DF	GIB	Kylie Duarte
5	DF	GIB	Lauren Hernandez
7	MF	GIB	Renai Marcus
8	MF	GIB	Anna Howard
9	FW	GIB	Seleen Celecia
10	FW	GIB	Tiana Borrell

No.	Pos.	Nation	Player
11	FW	GIB	Mara Todoran
12	DF	GIB	Natasha Escalona
14	MF	GIB	Justine Cantos
15		GIB	Bethany Rhead
17	DF	GIB	Harley McGuigan
18	FW	GIB	Ellen Dixon
20		GIB	Angelika Bosco
23		GIB	Gabriella Martinez
