= Gibraltar Wave FC =

Women's association football club in Gibraltar

- Full name: Gibraltar Wave Football Club
- Nickname: Wave
- Founded: March 15th 2021
- Ground: Victoria Stadium
- Capacity: 5000
- Owner: John Gontier
- Managing Director: Heiko Mock
- Head Coach: Dani Amaya
- League: Gibraltar Women's Football League
- 2025–26: 1st (Champions)
- Website: https://www.gibraltarwavefc.com
Home colours	Away colours	Third colours

Gibraltar Wave Football Club is an amateur community association football club in Gibraltar, currently playing in the Gibraltar Women's Football League. The club was formed in 2021 as an independent team, unaffiliated to any men's club, although in 2023 they entered a partnership with Mons Calpe to function as their women's team. As with all women's football teams in Gibraltar, they play their games at Victoria Stadium.

== History ==
Gibraltar Wave formed in 2021 by former Europa Point owner John Gontier, with an executive board made up of players Lauren Tomsett, Amanda Jackson. The team officially launched on 15 March 2021, outlining its mission statement as a community club and announcing a search for new players ahead of its debut in that April's Gibraltar Women's Futsal League. Managed by Spanish coach Dani Amaya, the team finished third in its group in its inaugural Women's Futsal League appearance. However, on 7 August 2021, the club appointed veteran coach Andy Parody to manage the side in their maiden football season. That summer, the club also partnered with the app Fanbase to engage with fans online. The club also recruited German Heiko Mock to assist with developing the team off the pitch, and improving the club's audience.

The club made their debut in 11-a-side football on 20 September 2021, in the Gibraltar Women's Football League. They defeated fellow newcomers Manchester 62 9–0, with hat-tricks from Gianelle Hanglin and Narges Mararat. The side finished 4th of 5 teams in its debut season, with 11 points. For the following season, the club announced that they would broadcast matches on the platform Recast, a first for women's football in Gibraltar.

Aside from football and futsal, the club also operates a beach soccer team, being the first organised team in Gibraltar. The side won the inaugural Beach Soccer Charity Tournament in 2021, and thus competed in the 2022 Women's Euro Winners Cup, becoming the country's first representatives at the tournament and its first international appearance. The team finished 15th in their tournament debut.

The 2024–25 season, after a slow start, saw significant improvement competing under the name Mons Calpe Gibraltar Wave. Under the management of Col Griffiths, the club made several high-profile mid-season signings including international players Caitlin Robba, Charlyann Pizzarello, Nicole Nash and Anna Howard. The club finished 3rd in the GWFL along with their first ever piece of silverware, beating Lynx in the Women's Rock Cup Final on 19 May 2025.

== ECA Network ==
In summer 2023 Gibraltar Wave FC was officially invted to the ECA Network, which is a number of 200 so-called "Aspiring Clubs of Europe".

In September 2023 Gibraltar Wave FC was one of the clubs attending the general assembly of the ECA in Berlin. Only a bit more than two years after the club was founded, it arrived in the center of European football. Even more, Gibraltar Wave FC was selected as a member of the Women's Football Working Group of the ECA for the 2023/27 cycle.

== Kits ==
The club colours are white and blue, based on their logo and the relationship to the ocean.

The club's away kit is orange with black and was introduced in the club's second season. Gibraltar Wave also features a distinct third kit, which was inspired by the colours of the country's national flag.

== Kit suppliers and shirt sponsors ==
Period	Kit manufacturer	Shirt sponsor (chest)	Shirt sponsor (sleeve)
2021-2022	Givova	None	None
2022-2023	JOMA	None	None
2023-present	JOMA	None	None

== Kit deals ==
Kit supplier	Period	Latest contract announcement	Current contract duration	Value	Notes
JOMA	2023-present		2023-		

== Current squad ==
Note: Flags indicate national team as defined under FIFA eligibility rules; some limited exceptions apply. Players may hold more than one non-FIFA nationality.

No.	Pos.	Nation	Player
1	GK	GIB	Caitlin Robba
2	DF	GIB	Josie Cummings
3	DF	ESP	África Melero
4	MF	GIB	Zarajan Lopez
5	DF	GIB	Lauren Hernández
6	DF	GIB	Arianne Parody
7	FW	ENG	Beverley Shing
8	MF	GIB	Karyn Barnett
9		GIB	Kyrelle Revagliatte
10	FW	GIB	Gianelle Hanglin

No.	Pos.	Nation	Player
11	FW	GIB	Saskia Phillips
12	FW	GIB	Karima Gracia
13	GK	ESP	Alba González
14	MF	ESP	Vanesa Morente
15		GIB	Phoebe Reyes
16		GIB	Beau Reyes
17	FW	GIB	Nicole Nash
18		ENG	Elah Dickinson
33		GIB	Sally Barton
—	FW	USA	Erica Petrie

== Club staff ==
Position	Name
Club Management
Head Coach	(Spain) Dani Amaya
Assistant Coach	(Spain) Maria Hidalgo
Physio	(Republic of Ireland) Matt Lawlor
Board
Chairman	(England) John Gontier
Managing Director	(Germany) Heiko Mock
Board Member	(Netherlands) Ixora Balootje
Commercial Manager	(Netherlands) Maurits de Jong
Sporting Director	(England) Shane Buchanan
Assistant to the Board	(Gibraltar) Sally Barton

== Honours ==
Gibraltar Women's Football League

- Champions: 2025–26

Women's Rock Cup

- Champions: 2024–25
