= Lynx F.C. Women =

Association football club in Gibraltar

Lynx FC Women
- Full name: Lynx Football Club Women
- Nickname: The Yellows
- Founded: 2020
- Ground: Victoria Stadium
- Capacity: 5000
- Chairman: Albert Parody
- Manager: Alex O'Prey
- League: Gibraltar Women's Football League
- 2024–25: 4th
- Website: http://www.lynxfc.com
Home colours

Lynx Football Club Women is an amateur association football club in Gibraltar, currently playing in the Gibraltar Women's Football League. The club, formed in 2020, is affiliated to Lynx.

== History ==
The club formed in 2020 after Lincoln Red Imps decided to disband their women's team, announcing its first signings along with its intention to compete on 1 December 2020. The team played their first ever game 2 weeks later, in the Gibraltar Women's Football League against Lions Gibraltar, a 3-0 defeat. After their first season, manager Col Griffiths stepped down on 30 June 2021.

== Current squad ==
Note: Flags indicate national team as defined under FIFA eligibility rules; some limited exceptions apply. Players may hold more than one non-FIFA nationality.

No.	Pos.	Nation	Player
1	GK	ESP	Isabel Chico Nuñez
2		GIB	Chloe Prescott
3	DF	GIB	Chantal Segui (captain)
4	DF	GIB	Angelina Avellano
6		ESP	Coraima Cereto
7		ESP	Tiana Arenas
8		ESP	Angeles Moreno
9		ESP	Ana de la Torre
10		GIB	Natalie Martinez

No.	Pos.	Nation	Player
13	GK	GIB	Jaylene Gaivizo
14		GIB	Narges Mararat
15		GIB	Natalie Baitson
16		GIB	Daniella Holmes
17		GIB	Elena Olivero
18		GIB	Roxy Alecio
19		ESP	Zaira Montes
23		ESP	Marta Ferrera
36		GIB	Jayann Mendez
