= Laguna =

Laguna (Italian and Spanish word for lagoon), is a Spanish, Italian, and Polish surname. It may also refer to:

== People ==
- Abe Laguna (born 1992), American DJ known as Ookay
- Ana Laguna (born 1955), Spanish-Swedish ballet dancer, court dancer and professor
- Andrés Laguna (1499–1559), Spanish physician, pharmacologist, and botanist
- Baruch Lopes Leão de Laguna (1864–1943), Dutch painter
- Benjamín Máximo Laguna y Villanueva (1822–1902), Spanish forester, entomologist and botanist
- Fábio Laguna (born 1977), Brazilian keyboardist
- Frederica de Laguna (1906–2004), American anthropologist
- Grace de Laguna (1878–1978), American philosopher
- Ieva Lagūna (born 1990), Latvian model
- Ismael Laguna (1943–2026), Panamanian boxer
- José Dapena Laguna (1912–1991), Puerto Rican politician
- José Durand Laguna (1889–1958), Argentine football manager
- Justo Oscar Laguna (1929–2011), Argentinian bishop
- Kenny Laguna (born 1948), American songwriter and record producer
- Ricardo Laguna (born 1982), Mexican-American professional BMX rider and television personality
- Theodore de Laguna (1876–1930), American philosopher, taught at Bryn Mawr College and in the Philippines, early feminist

== Places ==
=== Philippines ===
- Laguna (province), in the Calabarzon region in Luzon, Philippines
- Laguna, Cagdianao, a barangay in the province of Dinagat Islands, Philippines

=== United States ===
==== Arizona ====
- Laguna, Yuma County, Arizona
- Laguna Army Airfield, a military airport in Arizona

==== Florida ====
- Laguna Beach, Florida in Bay County, Florida

==== California ====
- Laguna, California (disambiguation)
- Laguna Beach, California, a seaside resort city in Orange County, about 50 miles (80 km) south of Los Angeles
- Laguna Canyon, a canyon that runs through the San Joaquin Hills in southern Orange County, California
- Laguna Creek, Elk Grove, California, a former census-designated place in Sacramento County
- Laguna Hills, California, a city in Orange County
- Laguna Mountains, a mountain range in San Diego County, California
- Laguna Niguel, California, a city in Orange County
- Laguna Woods, California, a city in Orange County, with 90% of the population 55 or older

==== New Mexico ====
- Laguna, New Mexico, also the location of Mission San José de la Laguna or "Old Laguna"

==== Texas ====
- Laguna, former name of Satin, Texas, United States

=== Elsewhere ===
- Laguny, a village in Poland located in the Masovian Voivodeship
- Laguna, New South Wales, a village in New South Wales, Australia
- Laguna, Santa Catarina, a city in Santa Catarina, Brazil
- Laguna City, a private-housing estate in Kowloon, Hong Kong

== Other uses ==
- CD Laguna (Valladolid), a football club in Laguna de Duero, Spain
- CD Laguna de Tenerife, a football club in San Cristóbal de La Laguna, Spain
- C.F. Laguna, a football club in Torreón, Coahuila, Mexico
- Chevrolet Chevelle Laguna, an automobile model from 1973 to 1976
- GP Laguna, a cycle race in Croatia
- Large Apparatus studying Grand Unification and Neutrino Astrophysics (LAGUNA), a neutrino observatory
- "Laguna", a Filipino folk-rock OPM song by Sampaguita
- Laguna Copperplate Inscription, an archaeological find in the Philippines
- Laguna F.C., a football team in Gibraltar
- Laguna Loire, a character in the video game Final Fantasy VIII
- Laguna (Madrid Metro), a station on Line 6 of the Madrid Metro
- Laguna Pueblo, a Native American people of the southwestern United States
- Laguna Resources, an Australian mining company
- Renault Laguna, a large family car manufactured by Renault from 1994 to 2015
- Laguna (publisher), Serbian book publishing company
- Laguna Sunrise, Song written by Black Sabbath, album Vol 4, 1972
- Laguna, one of hotel brands of Banyan Group
- Laguna, a large language model developed by Poolside AI

== See also ==
- La Laguna (disambiguation)
- Laguna Beach (disambiguation)
- Laguna Blanca (disambiguation)
- Laguna Creek (disambiguation)
- Laguna Seca (disambiguation)
- Laguna Verde (disambiguation)
- Lagunas (disambiguation)
- Lagunitas (disambiguation)
