= Laguna Blanca =

Laguna Blanca (meaning "white lagoon" in Spanish) may refer to:

- Laguna Blanca, Chaco, a community in the Libertad Department of Argentina
- Laguna Blanca, Formosa, a community in the Pilcomayo Department of Argentina
- Laguna Blanca, Río Negro, a municipality in Río Negro Province, Argentina
- Laguna Blanca (Bolivia)
- Cerro Laguna Blanca, Argentina
- Laguna Blanca (Chile), a lake in Chile
- Laguna Blanca, Chile, a commune
- Laguna Blanca (Paraguay)
- Laguna Blanca (California), U.S.

== See also ==
- Laguna Blanca School, California
- Laguna Blanca National Park, Argentina
- Laguna (disambiguation)
