= Fisher Creek =

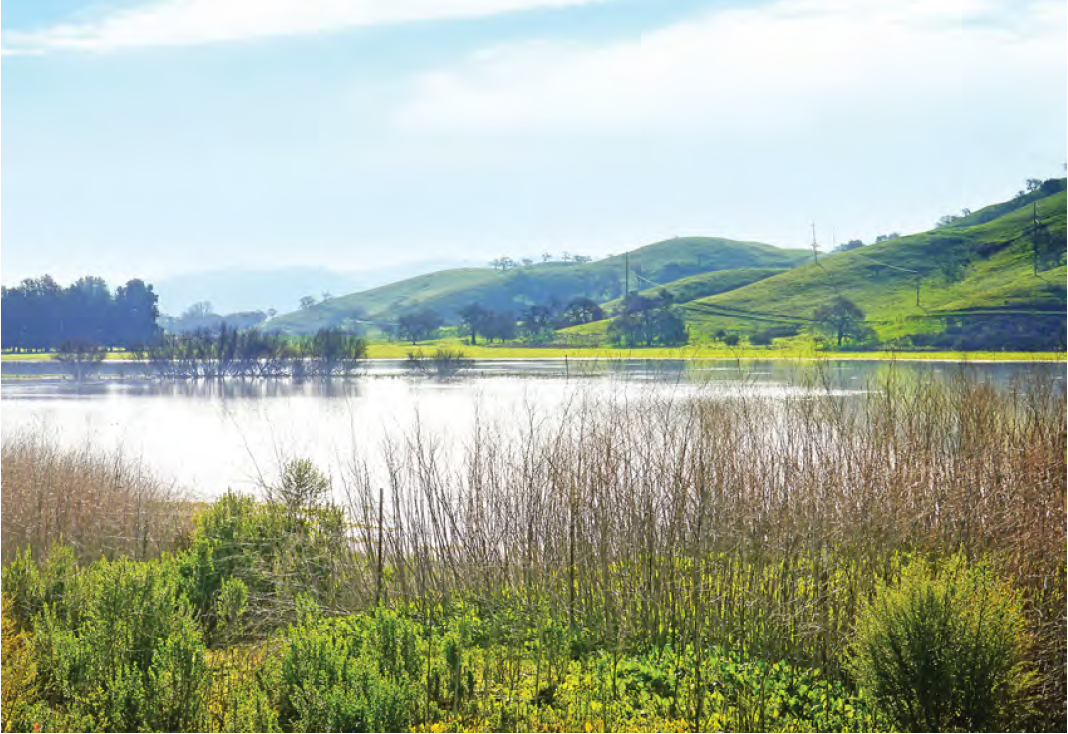
- Laguna Seca in Spring, 2017

Location
- Country: United States
- State: California
- Region: Santa Clara County
- Cities: Morgan Hill, Coyote

Physical characteristics
- Source
  - location: Morgan Hill
  - coordinates: 37°08′36″N 121°39′56″W
  - elevation: 351 ft (107 m)
- Mouth: Coyote Creek
  - location: Coyote
  - coordinates: 37°13′28″N 121°44′51″W
  - elevation: 234 ft (71 m)
- Length: 13.8 mi (22.2 km)confluence to mouth

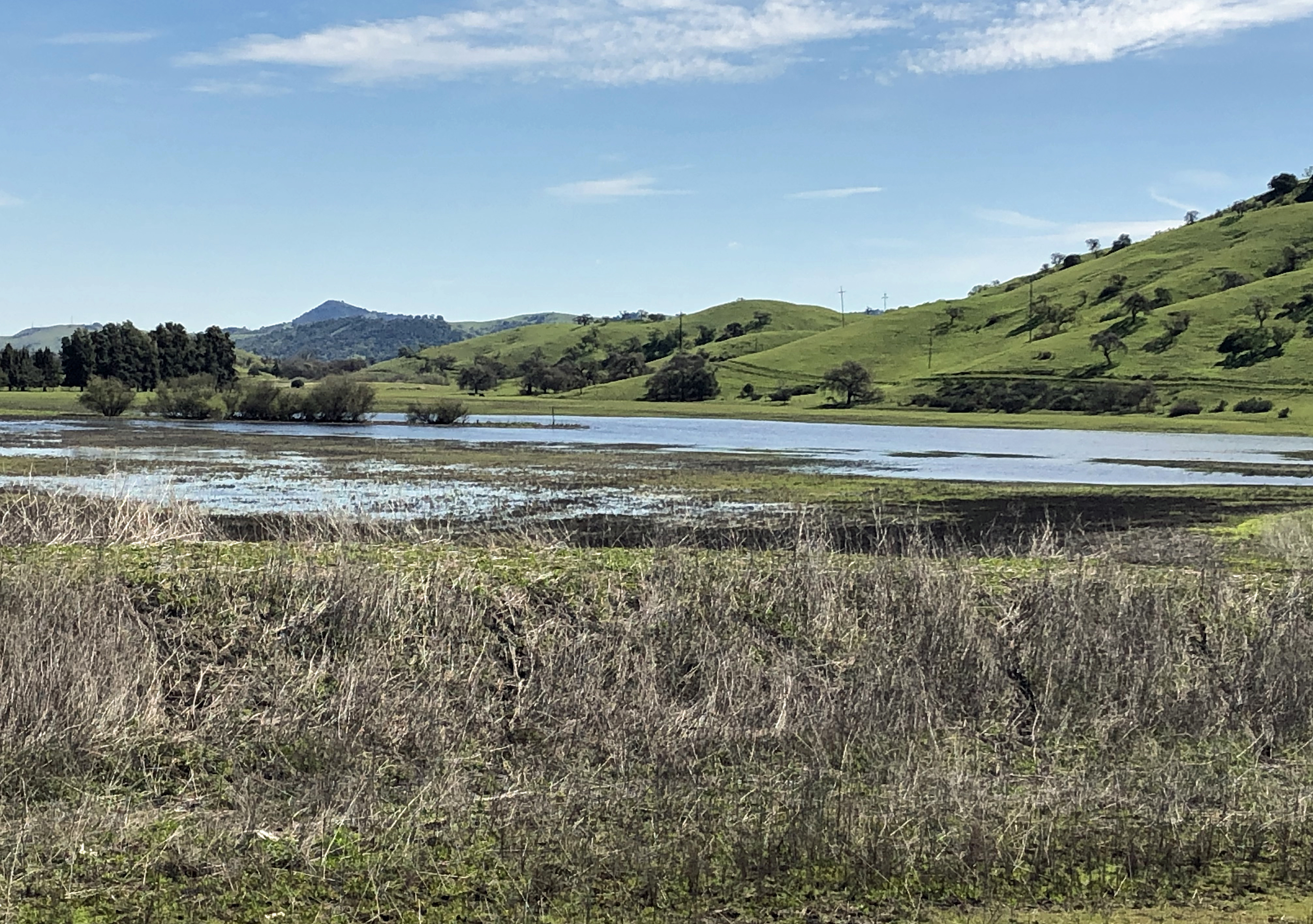
Laguna Seca in February, 2019, the largest seasonal freshwater lake in Santa Clara County, courtesy of Gary Jahns

Fisher Creek is a 13.8 miles (22.2 km) stream that flows northwesterly through the Coyote Valley in southern Santa Clara County, California, United States. It is a tributary to the largest freshwater wetland in Santa Clara County, Laguna Seca, a seasonal lake important to groundwater recharge. From Laguna Seca, Fisher Creek was connected to Coyote Creek by an artificial channel.

== History ==
Fisher Creek is named for Captain William James Fisher, one of the earliest American settlers in Santa Clara County, who was born July 25, 1810, in Boston, Massachusetts, and went to sea at age 13. He lived for some years in Lower California before buying Rancho Laguna Seca in 1845. In 1834, he married Señorita Liberata Ceseña, a native of Lower California and had four children. Fisher died April 5, 1850. In February 1846, Captain John Frémont on his third expedition, established camp at Fisher's Rancho Laguna Seca. From there Frémont went on to briefly hoist the American flag on then Gavilan Peak, now Fremont Peak.

Fisher Creek's historical terminus, Laguna Seca, was also known as Laguna de San Benvenuto. The Rancho Laguna Seca Mexican land grant was given in 1834 by Governor José Figueroa to Juan Alvires. "Laguna Seca" means "Dry Lake" in Spanish, and refers to the seasonal lake, Laguna Seca.

In October 2020 the Santa Clara Valley Habitat Agency acquired a 1,860 acres (7.5 km^{2}) portion of the Tilton Ranch, which extends northwards from Willow Springs Creek, the likely primary headwaters of Fisher Creek. The ranch was initially acquired by Howard Tilton in 1917. In about one year the property will be transferred to the Santa Clara Valley Open Space Authority.

== Watershed ==
Fisher Creek flows northwesterly along the western edge of Coyote Valley. It receives ephemeral flows from several creeks flowing easterly out of the eastern edge of the foothills of the Santa Cruz Mountains. The first of these is Willow Springs Creek (also known as Tilton Creek locally for the historic Tilton Ranch) which begins at 800 feet (240 m) elevation and flows northwest 1.5 miles (2.4 km) along Willow Springs Road until it joins Fisher Creek just past its intersection with Hale Avenue. The next tributary to Fisher Creek (heading downstream) San Bruno Canyon Creek along Hale Avenue. San Bruno Canyon hosts greenstone deposits which could be mined and crushed for road construction. From Laguna Avenue to north of Bailey Avenue seasonal wetlands capture the creek's flows, terminating historically in Laguna Seca just west of Tulare Hill and Santa Teresa Boulevard. An artificial channel extends Fisher Creek from Laguna Seca to Coyote Creek near Metcalfe Road.

A 2021 study recommended relocation of Fisher Creek to the westernmost, lowest elevation side of Coyote Valley, and re-establishing it as a relatively wide, meandering stream, maximizing habitat for riparian plant and animal species.

== Habitat and conservation ==
A report on the area's importance as a critical wildlife corridor recommended a riparian restoration project along Fisher Creek to reestablish stands of California sycamores (Platanus racemosa), Fremont cottonwoods (Populus fremontii) and willows (Salix sp.) and a reestablishment of valley oaks (Quercus lobata) throughout the valley. Fisher Creek is a tributary to the largest freshwater wetland in Santa Clara County, Laguna Seca. "In Coyote Valley, Laguna Seca offers a rare opportunity to restore natural wetland functions and a diverse wetland habitat mosaic. Laguna Seca restoration would link to existing buffers and have regional significance as a large, natural, valley floor wetland." These seasonal wetlands provide critical habitat to many species of wildlife year round and are important to migratory birds. Laguna Seca's vernal pools provide habitat for endangered species such as the California tiger salamander (Ambystoma californiense) and the California red-legged frog (Rana draytonii).

The fish species found in Fisher Creek include Sacramento sucker (Catostomus occidentalis), hitch (Lavinia exilicauda), Sacramento blackfish (Orthodon microlepidotus), prickly sculpin (Cottus asper), and three-spined stickleback (Gasterosteus aculeatus).

== See also ==
- Coyote Valley
- Rancho Laguna Seca
- List of rivers in California
- List of watercourses in the San Francisco Bay Area
