= 2018–19 Gibraltar Intermediate Cup =

Tournament details
- Country: Gibraltar
- Dates: 3 December 2018 – 15 January 2019
- Teams: 9

Final positions
- Champions: Mons Calpe Intermediate (1st title)
- Runner-up: Manchester 62 Intermediate

Tournament statistics
- Matches played: 7
- Goals scored: 28 (4 per match)
- Top goal scorer(s): (Spain) Nacho Callejón (Gibraltar) Ethan Moya (Gibraltar) Declan Pizarro (Spain) Alejandro Valero (Gibraltar) Jaron Vinet (2 goals)

The 2018–19 Gibraltar Intermediate Cup is a single-leg knockout tournament played by under-23 clubs from Gibraltar, who compete in the Gibraltar Intermediate League. With 9 teams competing in its inaugural edition, the first round consisted of two teams playing off to compete in the quarter-finals.

The champions of this first edition were Mons Calpe, who defeated Manchester 62 4–1 in the final on 15 January 2019.

== First round ==
The draw for the first round took place on 29 November 2018, with the match taking place on 3 December. The teams taking part were Lynx and Glacis United.

3 December 2018	Lynx F.C. Intermediate	0–3	Glacis United Intermediate	Gibraltar
20:30		Report	Pratts 39'; D. Pizarro 45', 74'	Stadium: Victoria Stadium

== Quarter-finals ==
The draws for the quarter-finals and semi-finals were made on 5 December 2018. The matches are to be played between 20–22 December 2018. St Joseph's dissolved their intermediate team ahead of their tie against Gibraltar Phoenix, so Phoenix were granted a walkover win.

20 December 2018	Manchester 62 Intermediate	2–1	Glacis United Intermediate	Gibraltar
18:15	Marquez 60'; Valero 75'	Report	J. Moreno 25'	Stadium: Victoria Stadium

20 December 2018	Europa Intermediate	3–2	Lincoln Red Imps Intermediate	Gibraltar
20:30	Coello 28'; Payas 35'; Muscat 81'	Report	Pons 3'; S. Montovio 36'	Stadium: Victoria Stadium

21 December 2018	St Joseph's Intermediate	w/o	Gibraltar Phoenix Intermediate	Gibraltar
18:15		Report		Stadium: Victoria Stadium

22 December 2018	Lions Gibraltar Intermediate	1–3	Mons Calpe Intermediate	Gibraltar
16:00	Ramagge 20'	Report	Bautista 74'; J. Vinet 86'; A. Gonzalez 90'}	Stadium: Victoria Stadium

== Semi-finals ==
Semi-finals took place on 6 January 2019.

6 January 2019	Mons Calpe Intermediate	1–0	Europa Intermediate	Gibraltar
16:00	Sosa 37'			Stadium: Victoria Stadium

6 January 2019	Gibraltar Phoenix Intermediate	2–5	Manchester 62 Intermediate	Gibraltar
19:00	Smullen; Sardeña	Report	Callejón; Moya; Sousa	Stadium: Victoria Stadium

== Final ==
15 January 2019
18:15 CEST

Mons Calpe Intermediate	4–1	Manchester 62 Intermediate
Morgan 18'; J. Vinet 36'; Robba 38'; Fernández 69'	Report	Valero 31'

Victoria Stadium, Gibraltar
Referee: Yaro Borg

Mons Calpe	Manchester 62

GK	1	(Poland) Axel Wajnsztejn
DF	3	(Gibraltar) Isaac Vinet
DF	4	(Spain) Juan Pablo Sosa (c) (yellow card)
DF	29	(Gibraltar) Luke Evans (substituted off) 69' (yellow card)
MF	8	(Gibraltar) Jaron Vinet (yellow card)
MF	11	(Gibraltar) Luke Bautista (substituted off) 84'
MF	20	(Gibraltar) Kevagn Robba (substituted off) 75'
MF	28	(Gibraltar) Ayoub El Hmidi (substituted off) 84'
MF	32	(Gibraltar) Kevagn Ronco
FW	25	(Gibraltar) Kelvin Morgan (substituted off) 84' (yellow card)
FW	26	(Argentina) Lautaro Fernández (substituted off) 75'
Substitutes:
DF	5	(Gibraltar) Jansen Dalli (substituted in) 84'
DF	6	(Gibraltar) Jude Furby (substituted in) 84'
MF	14	(Gibraltar) Zane Holgado (substituted in) 69'
MF	27	(Gibraltar) Houssam Ohassan (substituted in) 84'
FW	9	(Gibraltar) Alex Gonzalez (substituted in) 75'
FW	19	(Gibraltar) Haitham Tarrack (substituted in) 75'
Manager:
(Argentina) Pedro González

GK	24	(Gibraltar) Mickey Borge
DF	2	(Gibraltar) Luke Hinds
DF	4	(Gibraltar) Ethan Santos (yellow card)
DF	29	(Gibraltar) Nicholas Perera
MF	8	(Gibraltar) Matthew Langtry (substituted off) 58'
MF	23	(Gibraltar) Ethan Moya (substituted off) 60'
MF	28	(Gibraltar) Etien Victory (substituted off) 76'
MF	30	(Spain) Nacho Callejón (substituted off) 76' (yellow card)
MF	74	(Gibraltar) Kieron Garcia (c)
FW	10	(Argentina) Christian Toncheff
FW	33	(Spain) Alejandro Valero
Substitutes:
GK	1	(Gibraltar) Christian Lopez
DF	3	(Gibraltar) Sheigh Wilson
DF	66	(Portugal) Paulo Sousa (substituted in) 58'
MF	6	(Gibraltar) Angelo Lavagna (substituted in) 60'
MF	88	(Gibraltar) Michael Chipolina (substituted in) 76'
FW	19	(Spain) Samuel Fernández (substituted in) 76'
Manager:
(Gibraltar) Michael Borge

Match rules

- 90 minutes.
- 30 minutes of extra-time if necessary.
- Penalty shoot-out if scores still level.
- Six named substitutes.
- Maximum of six substitutions.

== Top Scorers ==
As of 15 January 2019.
2 goals

- (Gibraltar) Declan Pizarro (Glacis United)
- (Spain) Nacho Callejón (Manchester 62)
- (Gibraltar) Ethan Moya (Manchester 62)
- (Spain) Alejandro Valero (Manchester 62)
- (Gibraltar) Jaron Vinet (Mons Calpe)

1 goals

- (France) Enzo Coello (Europa)
- (Gibraltar) Lee Muscat (Europa)
- (Gibraltar) Aaron Payas (Europa)
- Peter Sardeña (Gibraltar Phoenix)
- Kayron Smullen (Gibraltar Phoenix)
- (Gibraltar) Jonathan Moreno (Glacis United)
- (Gibraltar) Daniel Pratts (Glacis United)
- (Gibraltar) Sean Montovio (Lincoln Red Imps)
- (Gibraltar) Alain Pons (Lincoln Red Imps)
- Brendan Ramagge (Lions Gibraltar)
- (Gibraltar) Lython Marquez (Manchester 62)
- (Portugal) Paolo Sousa (Manchester 62)
- (Gibraltar) Luke Bautista (Mons Calpe)
- (Argentina) Lautaro Fernández (Mons Calpe)
- (Gibraltar) Alex Gonzalez (Mons Calpe)
- (Gibraltar) Kelvin Morgan (Mons Calpe)
- (Gibraltar) Kevagn Robba (Mons Calpe)
- (Spain) Juan Pablo Sosa (Mons Calpe)
