= Laguna Seca (disambiguation) =

Laguna Seca is a road racing track in California. The term may also refer to:

- Laguna Seca Formation, a geologic formation in California
- Laguna Seca (Mexico), see Convention of London
- Laguna Seca (Santa Clara County), a seasonal lake in California
- Laguna Seca, Texas, United States
- Rancho Laguna Seca (Alvires), in Santa Clara County, California
- Rancho Laguna Seca, in Monterey County, California

== See also ==
- Laguna (disambiguation)
