= Tulare Hill =

Hill in Santa Clara County, California, US

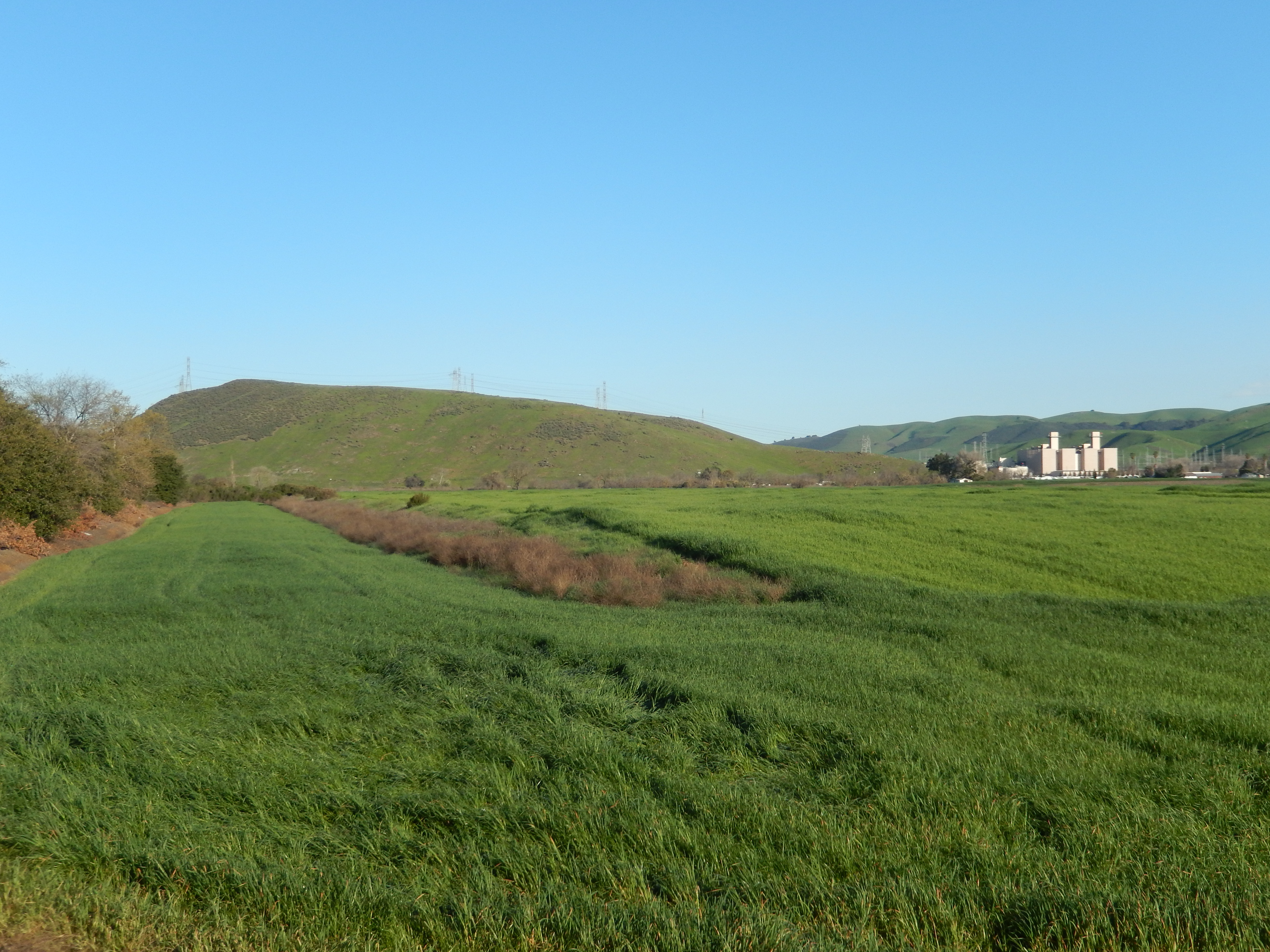
- Tulare Hill along Santa Teresa Boulevard

Highest point
- Elevation: 620 ft (190 m) NGVD 29
- Prominence: 320 ft (98 m) NGVD 29
- Coordinates: 37°13′16″N 121°45′18″W

Geography
- Location within California Location within the United States
- Location: Santa Clara County, California, U.S.
- Parent range: Santa Teresa Hills
- Topo map: USGS Tulare Hill

Tulare Hill is a prominent hill in the Santa Teresa Hills of western Santa Clara County, California. It lies along the southernmost edge of San Jose, California, adjacent to the Metcalf Energy Center. The hill and surrounding 330 acres (130 ha) of serpentine grasslands are home to the endangered Bay checkerspot butterfly and Dudleya setchellii wildflower. A portion of the hill makes up the Tulare Hill Ecological Preserve.

== Geography ==
The hill sits atop the narrowest gap between the Santa Cruz and Diablo mountain ranges, and overlooks the Laguna Seca wetlands in northern Coyote Valley.

== History ==
Spanish padre Francisco Palóu passed over Tulare Hill during a 1774 expedition.

The hill was once part of the historic Rancho Santa Teresa and Rancho Laguna Seca lands granted in the early 1800s.

=== Wildfires ===
In August 2019, a brush fire consumed approximately 60 acres along the southwestern part of the hill, as well as a small area on the eastern side of nearby Santa Teresa County Park.

== See also ==
- List of summits of the San Francisco Bay Area
