= Laguna Creek =

Laguna Creek is the name of several places and streams:

== Places ==
- Laguna Creek, Elk Grove, California, part of Elk Grove in Sacramento County, California
- Laguna Creek High School, a secondary school in Elk Grove, California

== Rivers ==
=== United States ===
==== Arizona ====
- Laguña Creek, a tributary to Chinle Creek, in Navajo County and Apache County, Arizona.

==== California ====
- Arroyo de la Laguna, a tributary of Alameda Creek in Alameda County, California
- Laguna Creek (Fremont), a creek also in Alameda County, just south of Alameda Creek in Fremont, but forming the independent Laguna Creek Watershed
- Laguna Creek (San Mateo County), a tributary of San Mateo Creek in San Mateo County, California
- Laguna Creek (Santa Cruz County)
