= Las Lagunas =

Las Lagunas may refer to the following places:

- Las Lagunas, San Luis, in San Luis province, Argentina
- Las Lagunas, San Juan, a locality in Sarmiento Department, San Juan, Argentina
- Las Lagunas, a district of Moca, Dominican Republic
- Las Lagunas, a district of Padre Las Casas, Dominican Republic
- Las Lagunas, Mijas, an area in Mijas, Spain

== See also ==
- Lagunas (disambiguation)
