= Laguna Beach (disambiguation) =

Laguna Beach, California is a city in Orange County, California, United States.

Laguna Beach may also refer to:

- Laguna Beach, Florida, a town in Bay County, Florida
- Laguna Beach: The Real Orange County, a reality TV program that aired on MTV (2004–2006)
- Lagoon-A-Beach, a water park in Laagoon amusement park in Farmington, Utah

== See also ==
- Laguna (disambiguation)
