= Lagunitas =

Lagunitas or Lagunita may refer to:

- Lagunitas, California, an unincorporated community in Marin County
- Lagunitas-Forest Knolls, California, a census-designated place in Marin County
- Lagunitas Brewing Company, a brewery founded in Lagunitas, California
- Lagunitas Creek, in Marin County, California
- Lake Lagunitas, a reservoir on Lagunitas Creek
- Lagunita, an ancient Mayan city
- Lake Lagunita, a dry artificial lake on the Stanford University campus in California
- Lagunitas Formation (disambiguation), several geological formations

== See also ==
- Laguna (disambiguation)
- Lagunas (disambiguation)
