= Tsegi Canyon =

Canyon in Navajo County, Arizona

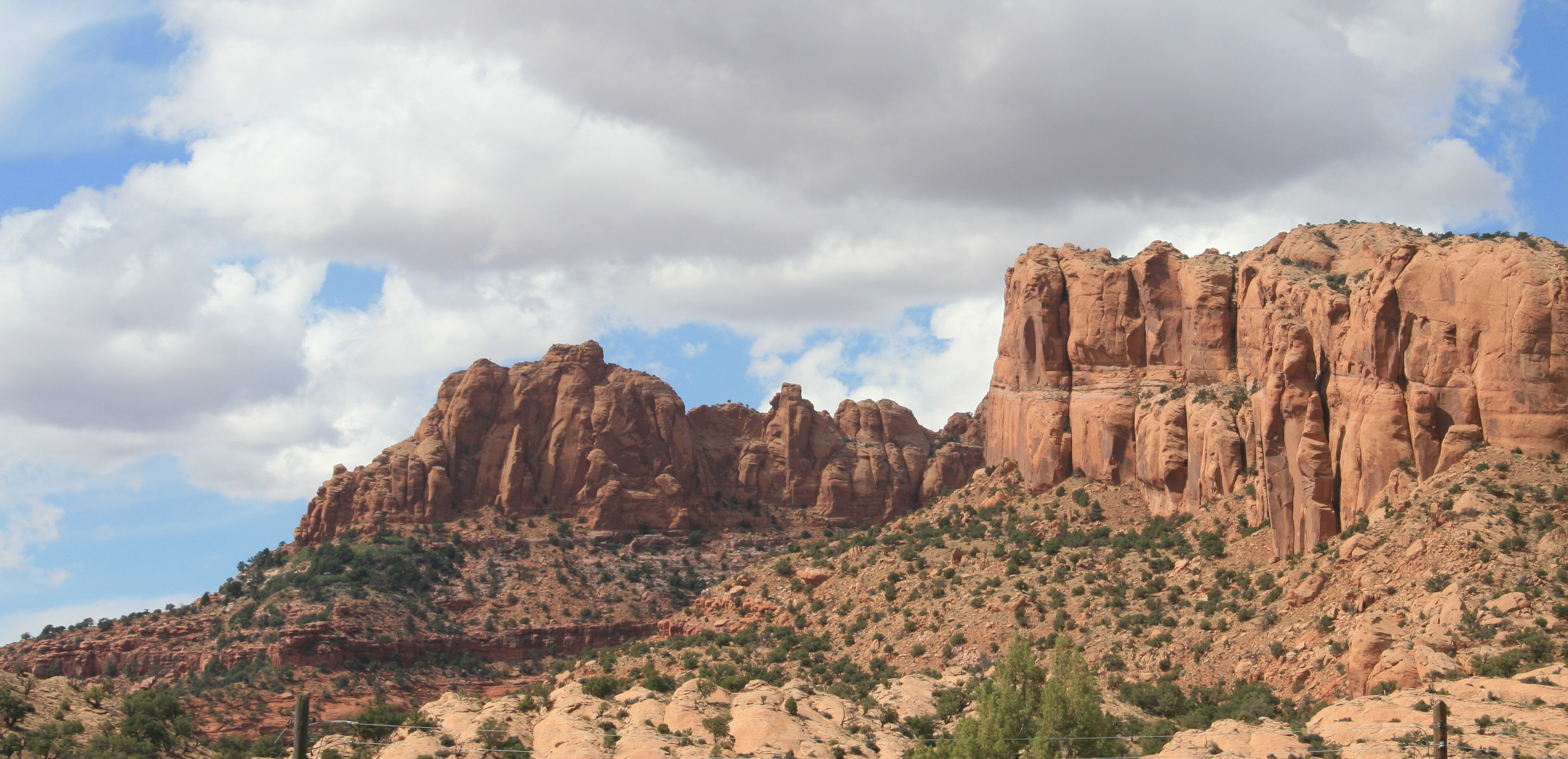
Tsegi Canyon from the north

Tsegi Canyon is a canyon in Navajo County, Arizona. Tsegi, meaning in between the rocks, is a Navajo descriptive term for deep canyons with sheer walls. Laguña Creek has its headwaters at the head of Tsegi Canyon at 36°41′11″N 110°30′33″W, where the creeks from Long Canyon and Dowozhiebito Canyon merge at an elevation of 6,325 feet (1,928 m). The canyon mouth is located at elevation of 6,024 feet (1,836 m) near Marsh Pass.
