= Kyle Goldwin =

Gibraltarian footballer (born 1985)

Personal information
- Full name: Kyle Albert Goldwin
- Date of birth: 24 April 1985 (age 41)
- Place of birth: Gibraltar
- Height: 1.82 m (6 ft 0 in)
- Position: Goalkeeper

Youth career
- Lincoln Red Imps

Senior career*
| Years | Team | Apps | (Gls) |
| –2009 | Laguna | | |
| 2009–2013 | Sporting Club Gibraltar | | |
| 2013–2014 | Glacis United | | |
| 2014–2019 | Gibraltar United | 140 | (0) |
| 2019–2021 | Lincoln Red Imps | 27 | (0) |

International career^{‡}
| 2018–2021 | Gibraltar | 21 | (0) |
- * Club domestic league appearances and goals as of 16 May 2021 ‡ National team caps and goals as of 8 October 2021

Kyle Albert Goldwin (born 24 April 1985), also known as Chino, is a Gibraltarian former footballer who played as a goalkeeper, most notably for Gibraltar United and Lincoln Red Imps. During his career, he earned 21 caps for the Gibraltar national football team.

== Club career ==
Primarily a futsal player after leaving the Lincoln Red Imps youth teams as a youngster, not much is known about Goldwin's career before 2009, when he joined Sporting Club Gibraltar from Laguna. After four years with the club, he joined Gibraltar Premier Division side Glacis United in 2013. Chances were limited as the influx of Spanish players after Gibraltar's admission to UEFA, so in 2014 he moved to the newly revived Gibraltar United. At a club with a philosophy of only signing local players, he became first choice as they earned promotion to the Premier Division at the first attempt. In March 2016, he signed a new long term deal to keep him at Gibraltar United for the foreseeable future. In both 2016 and 2017, he was named in Football Gibraltar's Fans XI at the end of season awards. In July 2019, Chino signed for Lincoln Red Imps, where he had been a youth player in the early 00s. In November 2021, he announced that he would retire from football at the end of the year, with his final match against Bruno's Magpies on 19 December.

== International career ==
Goldwin's impressive form for Gibraltar United saw calls for an international callup begin in late 2015. He was first named in a squad for Gibraltar in March 2016 for the games against Liechtenstein and Latvia, but didn't make his debut until 25 March 2018, when he started in a friendly against Latvia at Victoria Stadium. He played the full 90 minutes and earned a clean sheet as Gibraltar won the game 1–0, a rare win for the country.

On 13 October 2018, Goldwin was in goal as Gibraltar recorded their first competitive win in a 1–0 victory over Armenia in the 2018–19 UEFA Nations League. This marked his second clean sheet in his first four caps. In keeping the clean sheet Goldwin faced 34 shots including nine by Premier League star Henrik Mkhitaryan who was playing for Armenia.

== Career statistics ==
=== International ===
As of 8 October 2021.

International statistics
| National team | Season | Apps | Goals |
|---|---|---|---|
| Gibraltar | 2018 | 6 | 0 |
| Gibraltar | 2019 | 8 | 0 |
| Gibraltar | 2020 | 3 | 0 |
| Gibraltar | 2021 | 4 | 0 |
| Total | | 21 | 0 |

== Honours ==
Lincoln Red Imps

- Gibraltar National League: 2020–21
