= Laguna, California =

Laguna, California may refer to:

- Laguna, Sacramento County, California, former census-designated place
- Laguna West-Lakeside, Elk Grove, California, a community in and around what has since become the city of Elk Grove, California
- Laguna, Los Angeles County, California, now part of Commerce, California
- Laguna Beach, California, city in Orange County
- Laguna Hills, California, city in Orange County
- Laguna Niguel, California, city in Orange County
- Laguna Woods, California, city in Orange County

== See also ==
- Laguna (disambiguation)
