= 2018–19 Gibraltar Division 2 Cup =

2018–19 Second Division Cup
Tournament details
- Country: Gibraltar
- Dates: 3 January 2019 – 3 March 2019
- Teams: 7

Final positions
- Champions: Bruno's Magpies (1st title)
- Runners-up: Olympique 13

Tournament statistics
- Matches played: 21
- Goals scored: 100 (4.76 per match)
- Top goal scorer(s): (Spain) Alejandro Carenote (15 goals)

The 2018–19 Gibraltar Second Division Cup was the twelfth edition of the second division cup tournament on Gibraltar, and second under its current title. After a year without the tournament due to renovations to the only stadium on the territory, Victoria Stadium, the tournament returned in January 2019 during the 2018–19 Gibraltar Second Division's mid-season break.

Gibraltar Phoenix are the reigning champions, having won the last title in 2017, however they are unable to defend their title as they were promoted to the Gibraltar Premier Division at the end of the 2016–17 Gibraltar Second Division season.

The draw for the group stage was made along with first round draws for the 2019 Rock Cup and 2018–19 Gibraltar Intermediate Cup on 29 November 2018. Bruno's Magpies won the cup on 3 March 2019, defeating Olympique 13 2–1 in the final.

== Group stage ==
=== Group A ===
Pos	Team	Pld	W	D	L	GF	GA	GD	Pts	Qualification
1	Olympique 13	6	5	1	0	36	6	+30	16	Qualification for Semi-Finals
2	Leo	6	2	2	2	8	20	−12	8	Qualification for Semi-Finals
3	Europa Point	6	1	4	1	12	7	+5	7	
4	Hound Dogs	6	0	1	5	1	24	−23	1	

Source: GFA
Rules for classification: 1) points; 2) goal difference; 3) number of goals scored

7 January 2019	Europa Point	1–1	Hound Dogs	Victoria Stadium
18:15	Fakir Sellam 63'	Report	Moonilall 42'

8 January 2019	Leo	0–6	Olympique 13	Victoria Stadium
18:15		Report	Rojo 47'; Andrew Lopez 52'; Egbo 57'; Adrian Lopez 73'; Usman 80'; P. Ruiz 85'

16 January 2019	Europa Point	1–2	Olympique 13	Victoria Stadium
20:30	Sánchez 81'	Report	Rojo 20'; Egbo 87'

17 January 2019	Hound Dogs	0–2	Leo	Victoria Stadium
18:15		Report	Yavuz 70', 90'

23 January 2019	Olympique 13	10–0	Hound Dogs	Victoria Stadium
20:30	Parody 3'; Castle 7'; A. Carenote 11', 14', 24', 34', 42'; Egbo 64'; Ruiz 72', 80'	Report

26 January 2019	Europa Point	0–0	Leo	Victoria Stadium
20:30		Report

30 January 2019	Hound Dogs	0–6	Europa Point	Victoria Stadium
20:30		Report	Núñez 44', 60', 65', 78'; Sánchez 58'; C. Gonzalez 75'

31 January 2019	Olympique 13	12–3	Leo	Victoria Stadium
18:15	P. Ruiz 5', 30'; A. Carenote 13' (pen.), 24', 36', 55', 88'; Sene 38'; Garcia 50'; Egbo 54'; Rojo 80' (pen.), 82'	Report	Watson 52'; Mousdell 58', 75'

10 February 2019	Leo	1–0	Hound Dogs	Victoria Stadium
18:15	Muscat 25'	Report

16 February 2019	Olympique 13	2–2	Europa Point	Victoria Stadium
20:30	A. Carenote 26'; Rojo 35'	Report	J. Lopez 15'; Boulaich 89'	Referee: Daniel Gomez

19 February 2019	Hound Dogs	0–4	Olympique 13	Victoria Stadium
20:30		Report	Usman 37'; Nwankwo 58' (pen.); A. Carenote 63', 70'	Referee: Joel Orme

21 February 2019	Leo	2–2	Europa Point	Victoria Stadium
18:15	Mousdell 57', 90' (pen.)	Report	J. Lopes 71'; Nuñez 75' (pen.)

=== Group B ===
Pos	Team	Pld	W	D	L	GF	GA	GD	Pts	Qualification
1	Bruno's Magpies	4	3	1	0	16	3	+13	10	Qualification for Semi-Finals
2	Manchester 62	4	2	0	2	11	6	+5	6	Qualification for Semi-Finals
3	College 1975	4	0	1	3	4	19	−15	1	

Source: GFA
Rules for classification: 1) points; 2) goal difference; 3) number of goals scored

3 January 2019	College 1975	3–3	Bruno's Magpies	Victoria Stadium
18:15	Marin 14'; Field 43', 78'	Report	Cuesta 62', 87'; Wyatt 90'

24 January 2019	Manchester 62	0–3	Bruno's Magpies	Victoria Stadium
18:15		Report	Covello 11'; Assumpção 27'; Parry 54'

28 January 2019	Bruno's Magpies	5–0	College 1975	Victoria Stadium
20:30	Wyatt 8', 44', 80'; Assumpção 40'; Grech 62'	Report

3 February 2019	Manchester 62	5–1	College 1975	Victoria Stadium
18:15	Marquez 28'; Toncheff 66'; S. Fernández 73', 79'; Montovio 75'	Report	Palmero 65'

17 February 2019	Bruno's Magpies	5–0	Manchester 62	Victoria Stadium
18:15	Assumpção 14', 22'; Dimitriu 17'; Cuesta 18'; Grech 66'	Report		Referee: Juan José Villada

20 February 2019	College 1975	0–6	Manchester 62	Victoria Stadium
20:30		Report	Caro 1'; Langtry 22', 37', 39'; McCarthy 84'; Montovio 90'

== Semi-finals ==
The semi-finals were played on the 24 February.

24 February 2019	Olympique 13	2–0	Manchester 62	Gibraltar
18:15	A. Carenote 23'; Parody 74'	Report		Stadium: Victoria Stadium

24 February 2019	Bruno's Magpies	5–2	Leo	Gibraltar
20:30	Wyatt 24'; Thomas 31'; Assumpção 45'; Dimitriu 61'; Parry 70'	Report	Mousdell 60', 90'	Stadium: Victoria Stadium

== Final ==
3 March 2019
19:00 CET

Olympique 13	1–2	Bruno's Magpies
A. Carenote 12'	Report	Gray 71'; Wyatt 83'

Victoria Stadium, Gibraltar

GK	13	(Spain) Carlos Carenote (c)
DF	2	(Gibraltar) Steffan Cardona	(substituted off) 61'
DF	17	(Nigeria) Godwin Egbo		Booked
DF	23	(Spain) Kiki	(substituted off) 77'
DF	27	(Spain) Dani Corderó		Booked
MF	6	(Gibraltar) Nick Castle		Booked
MF	7	(Gibraltar) Jaydan Parody
MF	8	(Gibraltar) Jonatan García Navas		Booked
MF	18	(Nigeria) Uche Nwankwo
FW	9	(Spain) Alejandro Carenote
FW	21	(Spain) Riki Rojo	(substituted off) 67'
Substitutes:
DF	3	(Spain) Pedro Perez Ruiz	(substituted on) 67'	Booked
DF	4	(Spain) Jonathan Guerrero
MF	12	(Gibraltar) Adrian Lopez	(substituted on) 61'
MF	15	(Gibraltar) Karl Sene
MF	22	(Gibraltar) Andrew Lopez	(substituted on) 77'	Booked
FW	10	(Gibraltar) Angelo Lavagna
FW	20	(Nigeria) Dizza Usman
Manager:
(Germany) Ángel Parla-Díaz

GK	1	(United States) Ryan MacArthur
DF	5	(Scotland) Ross Gray (c)
DF	6	(Gibraltar) Carl Thomas
DF	15	(Gibraltar) Jamie Fortuna		Booked
MF	9	(England) Thomas Parry
MF	10	(Gibraltar) Ashley Rodriguez
MF	17	(Brazil) Matheus Assumpção		Booked
MF	18	(Canada) Alex Dimitriu		Booked
MF	23	(United States) Chase Covello
FW	20	(Spain) Fernando Cuesta	(substituted off) 64'
FW	21	(England) Finnlay Wyatt
Substitutes:
DF	22	(Scotland) Mel-Jose Brown
DF	25	(Gibraltar) Michael Macias
DF	30	(Scotland) Davie Wilson
MF	16	(Gibraltar) Matthew Grech	(substituted on) 64'
MF	29	(Gibraltar) Alejandro Allbones
FW	11	(England) Scott Blake
Manager:
(Scotland) Davie Wilson

Match rules

- 90 minutes.
- 30 minutes of extra-time if necessary.
- Penalty shoot-out if scores still level.
- Seven named substitutes.
- Maximum of three substitutions.

== Top Scorers ==
As of 3 March 2019.

15 goals

- (Spain) Alejandro Carenote (Olympique 13)

6 goals

- (England) Finnlay Wyatt (Bruno's Magpies)
- (England) Chris Mousdell (Leo)

5 goals

- (Brazil) Matheus Assumpção (Bruno's Magpies)
- (Spain) Christian Núñez (Europa Point)
- (Spain) Riki Rojo (Olympique 13)
- (Spain) Pedro Ruiz (Olympique 13)

4 goals

- (Nigeria) Godwin Egbo (Olympique 13)

3 goals

- (Spain) Fernando Cuesta (Bruno's Magpies)
- (Gibraltar) Matthew Langtry (Manchester 62)

2 goals

- (Canada) Alex Dimitriu (Bruno's Magpies)
- (Gibraltar) Matthew Grech (Bruno's Magpies)
- (England) Thomas Parry (Bruno's Magpies)
- (Gibraltar) Jonathan Field (College 1975)
- (Gibraltar) Julian Lopez (Europa Point)
- (Spain) Alexis Sánchez (Europa Point)
- (Republic of Ireland) Ekrem Yavuz (Leo)
- (Spain) Samuel Fernández (Manchester 62)
- (Gibraltar) Robert Montovio (Manchester 62)
- (Gibraltar) Jaydan Parody (Olympique 13)
- (Nigeria) Dizza Usman (Olympique 13)

1 goal

- (United States) Chase Covello (Bruno's Magpies)
- (Scotland) Ross Gray (Bruno's Magpies)
- (Gibraltar) Carl Thomas (Bruno's Magpies)
- (Spain) Francisco Marin (College 1975)
- (Spain) Rubén Palmero (College 1975)
- (Gibraltar) Ayman Boulaich (Europa Point)
- (Gibraltar) Haitam Fakir Sellam (Europa Point)
- (Gibraltar) Christian Gonzalez (Europa Point)
- (Gibraltar) Jesse Moonilall (Hound Dogs)
- (Gibraltar) Kaylan Muscat (Leo)
- (Gibraltar) James Watson (Leo)
- (Spain) Javier Caro (Manchester 62)
- (Gibraltar) Lython Marquez (Manchester 62)
- (Gibraltar) Jamie-Luke McCarthy (Manchester 62)
- (Argentina) Christian Toncheff (Manchester 62)
- (Gibraltar) Nick Castle (Olympique 13)
- (Gibraltar) Jonatan García Navas (Olympique 13)
- (Gibraltar) Adrian Lopez (Olympique 13)
- (Gibraltar) Andrew Lopez (Olympique 13)
- (Nigeria) Uche Nwankwo (Olympique 13)
- (Gibraltar) Karl Sene (Olympique 13)
