= Finnlay Wyatt =

English footballer

Personal information
- Date of birth: 18 January 1995 (age 31)
- Place of birth: Sheffield, England
- Position: Midfielder

Youth career
- Sheffield Wednesday
- Richmond Kickers

College career
Years	Team	Apps	(Gls)
2013	VCU Rams	0	(0)
2014–2016	Longwood Lancers	53	(11)

Senior career*
Years	Team	Apps	(Gls)
2017–2018	Richmond Kickers	13	(0)
2018–2019	Bruno's Magpies	10	(10)
- * Club domestic league appearances and goals as of 1 April 2023

Finnlay Wyatt (born 18 January 1995) is an English footballer.

== Career ==
Wyatt signed with the United Soccer League side Richmond Kickers on 25 February 2017. He made his professional debut on 25 March 2017 in a 1–0 victory over Harrisburg City Islanders. In summer 2018, he joined Bruno's Magpies in Gibraltar. He won his first competition with the club on 3 March 2019, scoring the winning goal in the 2018–19 Gibraltar Division 2 Cup final against Olympique 13.

== Achievements ==
Bruno's Magpies

- Gibraltar Division 2 Cup: 2018–19
