= David Wilson (Scottish football manager) =

Scottish footballer and manager

Personal information
- Full name: David James Wilson
- Date of birth: 22 February 1974 (age 52)
- Place of birth: Kilwinning, Scotland
- Position: Defender

Team information
- Current team: Lions Gibraltar (head coach)

Youth career
- 1988–1992: Kilmarnock

Senior career*
Years	Team	Apps	(Gls)
- Pennyburn Boys Club
- Ardeer Thistle
- Kilwinning Rangers
1994–1995	Worthing Town		
1996–1997	Bashley		
1998–2002	Newport (Isle of Wight)	126	(11)
2002–2003	Bashley		
- Troon
- Saltcoats Victoria
- Auchinleck Talbot
2019	Bruno's Magpies	7	(0)

Managerial career
- 2013–2015: Gibraltar (assistant manager)
- 2015: Gibraltar (interim manager)
- 2015–2016: Gibraltar (assistant manager)
- 2015–2016: Manchester 62 (assistant manager)
- 2016: Lions Gibraltar
- 2016–2019: Bruno's Magpies
- 2019–2022: Manchester 62
- 2023: Mons Calpe U23 (caretaker)
- 2024: St Joseph's U23
- 2024–2025: Lions Gibraltar
- * Club domestic league appearances and goals

David Wilson (born 22 February 1974) is a Scottish football manager who is currently head coach for Lions Gibraltar in the Gibraltar Football League. From April 2013 to March 2015, he served as an assistant manager of the national team under head coach Allen Bula and held the position when the Gibraltar Football Association (GFA) was admitted to UEFA in May 2013. He has also managed Bruno's Magpies and Manchester 62.

== Early life ==
Wilson was born in Redlands hospital on the west end of Glasgow, Scotland and his family moved to Pennyburn area of Kilwinning in 1985.

== Career ==
=== Playing career ===
During his short playing career, Wilson played for Pennyburn Boys Club, Ardeer Thistle, and Kilwinning Rangers, for which he was considered a "star" during the 1990s under head coach Jim McSherry. He was also on the books of Kilmarnock from 1988 to 1992 as an S form Schoolboy before becoming one of the club's first ever apprentice professional footballers under manager Jim Fleeting in 1990. Wilson decided to walk away from playing at only 19 years of age because he thought that he would never make it at the top level. At this time, Wilson joined the Royal Navy. During his time serving with the Royal Navy Wilson maintained a good level of football representing Worthing Town 1994–95, Bashley FC 1996–97, Newport isle of wight from 1998 to 2002, before returning to Bashley FC for his final year of football south of the border in 2002–03 playing in the Hampshire cup final against Aldershot Town FC. between 2003 and 2005 Wilson represented three Scottish non league clubs, Troon, Saltcoats Victoria and finally Auchinleck Talbot before deciding to retire from playing. In 2019 he re-registered as a player, aged 44, amid an injury crisis at Bruno's Magpies, playing 65 minutes at centre-back in a 5-2 Gibraltar Division 2 Cup win over Leo.

=== Managerial career ===
In 2008, Wilson's Navy career took him to Gibraltar to serve as an Exercise Rehabilitation Officer. He also played in matches organized by the Royal Navy Football Association. At this time, he also offered his services to local football clubs to help with fitness. After becoming acquainted with Allen Bula, head coach of the Gibraltar national football team, Wilson was asked to offer his services to the national team in April 2013. After initially thinking that he would only be assessing players and helping with rehabilitation, he soon discovered Bula wanted him to become his "right hand man" and was named an assistant.

Wilson was then on the bench as Gibraltar made their international debut in November 2013, a scoreless draw against Slovakia. Wilson described it as a special occasion when Gibraltar was drawn into the same qualifying group as his native Scotland for UEFA Euro 2016 qualifying, Gibraltar's first appearance in an official UEFA tournament.

After Bula was dismissed as head coach of the Gibraltar national team on 2 March 2015, Wilson was named interim head coach beginning with the team's 29 March 2015 UEFA Euro 2016 qualifying fixture against his native Scotland at Hampden Park. Wilson currently holds his Uefa 'A' Coaching licence having completed both his Uefa A and B coaching badges in his native Scotland.

== Achievements ==
Bruno's Magpies

- Gibraltar Second Division: 2018–19
- Gibraltar Division 2 Cup: 2018–19

Manchester 62

- GFA Challenge Trophy: 2021–22

== Managerial statistics ==
As of 2 November 2024

Includes accredited UEFA fixture(s) only:

Team	From	To	Record						
Team	From	To	G	W	D	L	GF	GA	Win %
Gibraltar (caretaker)	March 2015	July 2015	3	0	0	3	1	17	0.00
Lions Gibraltar	July 2016	September 2016	0	0	0	0	0	0	—
Bruno's Magpies	October 2016	October 2019	67	48	11	8	267	79	71.64
Manchester 62	November 2019	October 2022	55	16	8	31	70	140	29.09
Mons Calpe U23 (caretaker)	September 2023	September 2023	1	0	0	1	3	4	0.00
St Joseph's U23	January 2024	May 2024	2	0	0	2	2	7	0.00
Lions Gibraltar	July 2024	Present	9	3	2	4	15	14	33.33
Total			137	67	21	49	358	261	48.91
