= Laguna Seca (Santa Clara County) =

Lake in the state of California, United States

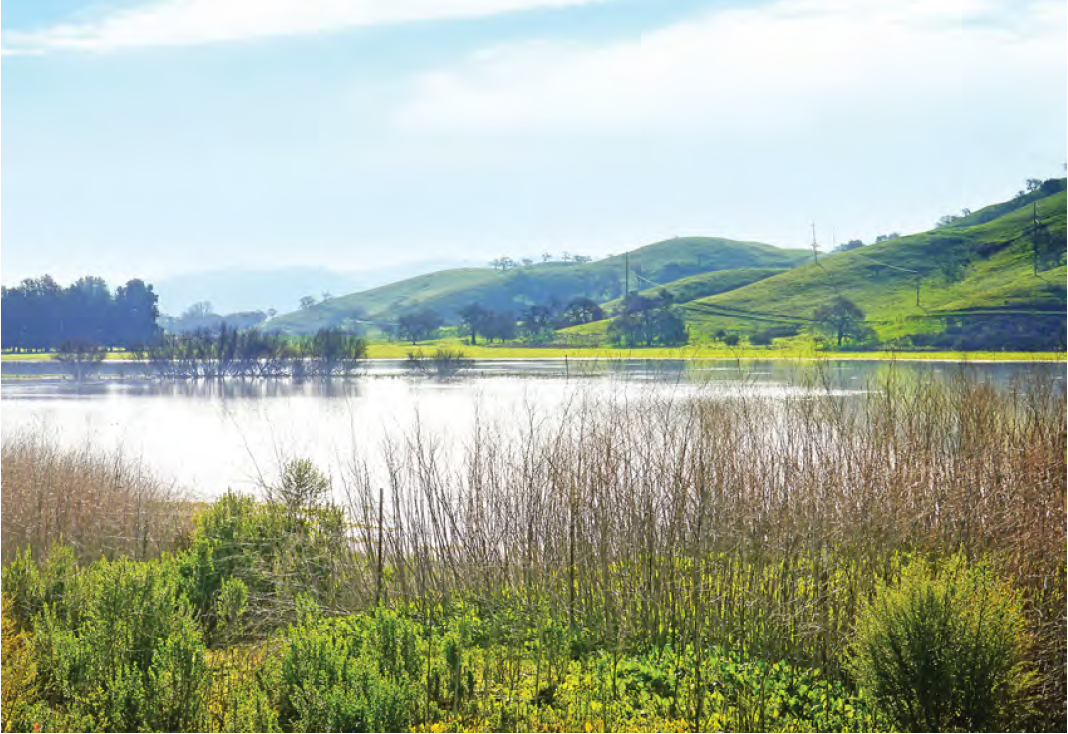
- Laguna Seca is the largest freshwater lake and wetland in Santa Clara County.

- Location within California
- Location: Santa Clara County, California, United States
- Coordinates: 37°12′46″N 121°45′20″W
- Basin countries: United States
- Surface elevation: 243 ft (74 m)

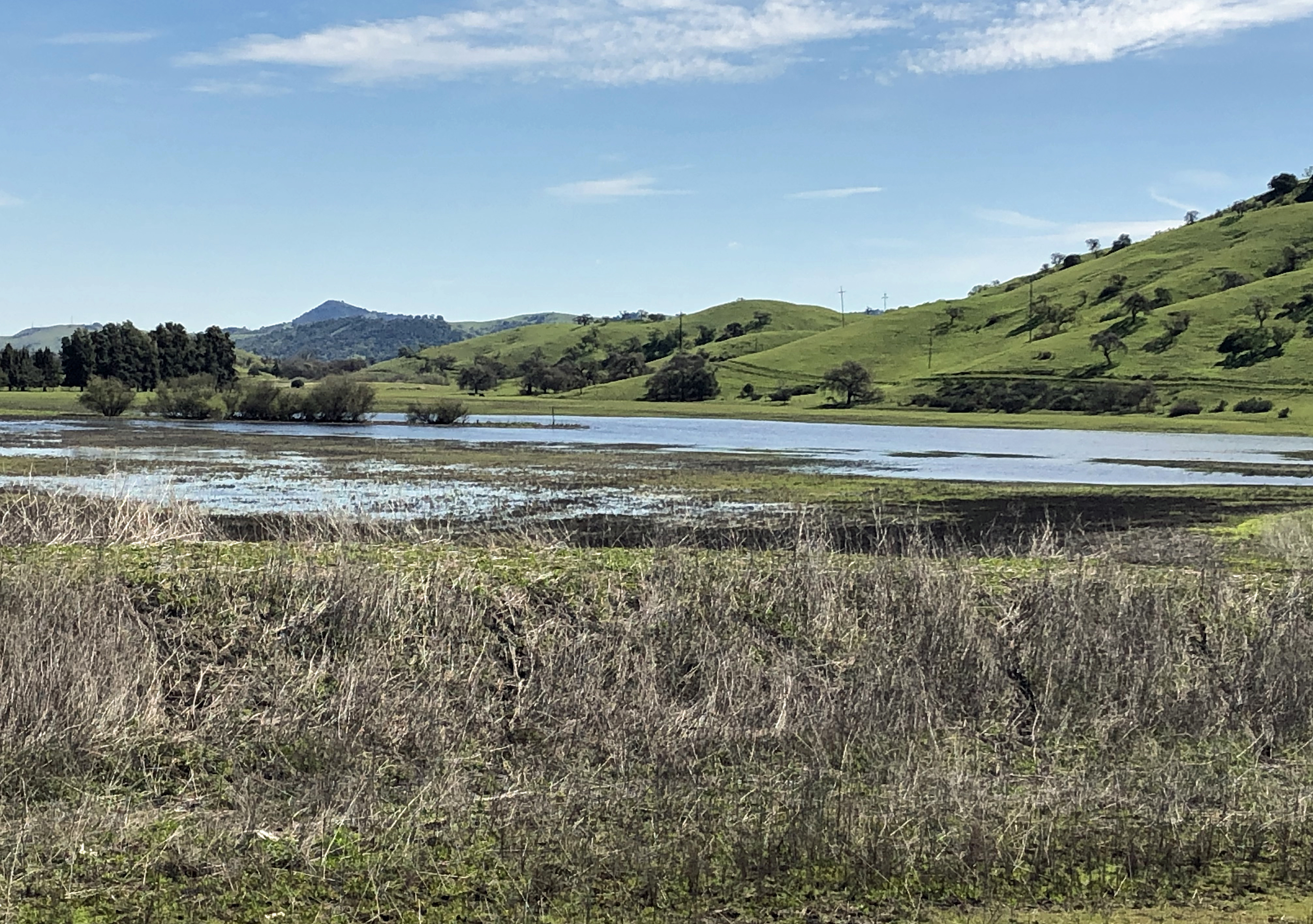
Laguna Seca in February 2019

Laguna Seca (Spanish for "Dry Lake") is a seasonal lake located in south Santa Clara Valley in the Coyote Valley, an area critical to wildlife as the narrowest corridor connecting Mt. Hamilton and the Diablo Range on the east to the foothills of the Santa Cruz Mountains to the west. It is the largest freshwater wetland in Santa Clara County, California and lies between Tulare Hill and the Santa Teresa Hills just west of Santa Teresa Boulevard and north of Bailey Avenue. Laguna Seca is fed by Fisher Creek. A man-made channel extends Fisher Creek to Coyote Creek.

== History ==
The first written historical account of La Laguna Zeca 'the dry lake' was first described on 31 October 1797.

Rancho Laguna Seca (Alvires) or Refugio de la Laguna Seca is a Mexican land grant presumably named for the seasonal lake. The grant was made July 22, 1834 to Juan Alvires by Governor José Figueroa.

Historically, Laguna Seca was an approximately 1,000-acre spring-fed perennial wetland mosaic of flooded wet meadows and smaller perennial freshwater marshes and lagunas. It occasionally dried up in drought years. From 1916 to 1917, Laguna Seca was largely filled in to permit agriculture.

== Geology and ecology ==
The remnants of Laguna Seca are bordered by and west of Santa Teresa Boulevard, located at the north end of the area now known as Coyote Valley at the base of the saddle between Tulare Hill and the Santa Teresa Hills. The marshes and lagunas formed as the bedrock of the Santa Teresa Hills forced groundwater to the surface and drainage was blocked by the natural levees of Coyote Creek. In addition, the heavy clay soils characteristic of the bottomland areas, often referred to as "black adobe" soils, often forced groundwater to the surface as springs and seeps. The lake helps recharge the aquifer in the Coyote Valley. Laguna Seca could provide major flooding protection to downstream San Jose, if the man-made extension of Fisher Creek from Laguna Seca to Coyote Creek was removed. It has been shown that Fisher Creek currently contributes approximately 57% of peak flows that exceed channel holding capacity during a 10-year flooding event at William Street in downtown San Jose and that hydrologic restoration projects designed to spread, capture, and sink excess stormwater in the Coyote Valley could reduce the risk of flooding to downstream areas while also recharging Coyote Valley's groundwater sub-basin (Robins 2016).

Today the waters of Laguna Seca are ponded above the surface December to May, but near the surface all year-round. It hosts endangered amphibian species such as the California tiger salamander (Ambystoma californiense) and the California red-legged frog (Rana draytonii). It is also an important stopover for migrating waterfowl.

Potential restoration of Laguna Seca provides an unusual opportunity to restore natural wetland functions and a diverse, large, natural, valley floor wetland. Successful wetland restoration at Laguna Seca could support a wide range of threatened species, including rare plants, amphibians, and water birds. It would also act as a natural flood basin moderating flood impacts on downstream Coyote Creek in urban San Jose.

== See also ==
- Rancho Laguna Seca (Alvires)
- Coyote Creek (Santa Clara County)
- Mt. Hamilton
- WeatherTech Raceway Laguna Seca
