= Rancho Ojo del Agua de la Coche =

Mexican land grant in California

Coordinates: 37.150°N 121.650°W

Rancho Ojo de Agua de la Coche was a 8,927-acre (3,613 ha) Mexican land grant in present-day Santa Clara County, California given in 1835 by Governor José Figueroa to Juan María Hernandez. The name means "pig's spring". The grant extended south from Rancho Laguna Seca (Alvires) between Coyote Creek and Llagas Creek, and encompassed present-day Morgan Hill.

== History ==
Juan Maria Jorge Hernandez (born 1776) married Maria Francisca Lorenzana (1782–1852) in 1800, and received the two square league Rancho Ojo de Agua de la Coche in 1835.

In 1846, Martin Murphy Sr. purchased the 9,000 acres (3,600 ha) Rancho Ojo del Agua de la Coche. Martin Murphy Sr. had brought his family to California with the Stephens-Townsend-Murphy Party in 1844. Son Martin Murphy Jr. was the founder of the city of Sunnyvale. Murphy's sons, John and Daniel, struck gold in the Sierras, then made a fortune selling dry goods to local miners and Native Americans. The town they established in the Sierra foothills still bears the family name — Murphys. In 1851, Daniel Martin Murphy married Maria Fisher, of the neighboring Rancho Laguna Seca. Martin Murphy Sr. died in 1865.

With the cession of California to the United States following the Mexican-American War, the 1848 Treaty of Guadalupe Hidalgo provided that the land grants would be honored. As required by the Land Act of 1851, a claim for Rancho Ojo del Agua de la Coche was filed with the Public Land Commission in 1853, and the grant was patented to Murphy Sr.'s son, Bernard Murphy in 1860.

Bernard Murphy was killed in the explosion of the steamboat "Jenny Lind" en route from Alviso to San Francisco on April 11, 1853. In 1854, Daniel Murphy took over operation of Rancho Ojo del Agua de la Coche. When Daniel Murphy died in 1882, his daughter Diana and son Daniel Jr. inherited his land grants. Diana Murphy, who inherited 4,500 acres (1,821 ha) of the ranch, married Hiram Morgan Hill in 1882.

In 1892, Diana Murphy, sold her portion of Rancho Ojo de Agua de la Coche to real estate developer Chauncey Hatch Phillips.
