= Lagunas =

Lagunas (Spanish: lagoons) may refer to:

- Lagunas de Ruidera, park
- Lagunas de Nisibón, city in the Dominican Republic
- Lagunas District, Alto Amazonas, Peru
- Lagunas District, Chiclayo, Peru
- Lagunas de Mejia National Sanctuary, Peru
- Lagunas de Chacahua National Park, Oaxaca, Mexico
- San Bernardino Lagunas, Puebla, Mexico
- "Lagunas" (song), by Peso Pluma and Jasiel Nuñez

== See also ==
- Las Lagunas (disambiguation)
- Laguna (disambiguation)
- Lagunitas (disambiguation)
