= Long Canyon (Navajo County, Arizona) =

Canyon in Navajo County, Arizona, US

Long Canyon is a canyon in Navajo County, Arizona. The source of Long Canyon is located at 36°50′04″N 110°28′08″W. Laguña Creek has its headwaters at the mouth of Long Canyon, where the creeks from Long Canyon and Dowozhiebito Canyon have their confluence at an elevation of 6,322 feet (1,927 meters) at the head of Tsegi Canyon.
