= Dowozhiebito Canyon =

Canyon in Navajo County, Arizona

Dowozhiebito Canyon is a canyon in Navajo County, Arizona. The head of Dowozhiebito Canyon is at 36°49′48″N 110°27′39″W. Laguña Creek has its headwaters at the mouth of Dowozhiebito Canyon, where the creeks from Long Canyon and Dowozhiebito Canyon have their confluence at an elevation of 6,325 feet (1,928 meters) at the head of Tsegi Canyon.
