= Marsh Pass =

Gap in Navajo County, Arizona

Coordinates: 36°39′06″N 110°25′48″W

Marsh Pass, also known as La Puerta Limita, "The Border Gate", is a gap in Navajo County, Arizona. It lies at an elevation of 6,102 feet (1,860 meters) along Laguña Creek. The name of Marsh Pass is thought to come from its location along a chain of swamps and lakes in the pass, that have since been drained by a deep arroyo.

== History ==
The original Spanish name of the pass, La Puerta Limita, indicated the border between the Mexican provinces of Santa Fe de Nuevo México and Alta California to the west. Marsh Pass was a location along the Armijo Route of the Old Spanish Trail between present day Kayenta and the Crossing of the Fathers on the Colorado River. There the route turned northwest toward the crossing on the Colorado River.
