= Laguna Blanca, Río Negro =

Laguna Blanca
- Municipality and village
- Location in Argentina
- Coordinates: 40°43′19″S 69°50′29″W
- Country: Argentina
- Province: Río Negro Province
- Time zone: UTC−3 (ART)

Laguna Blanca is a village and municipality in Río Negro Province in Argentina.
