= Laguna Blanca, Chaco =

Coordinates: 27°15′16″S 59°13′52″W

Laguna Blanca (Chaco)
- Municipality and village
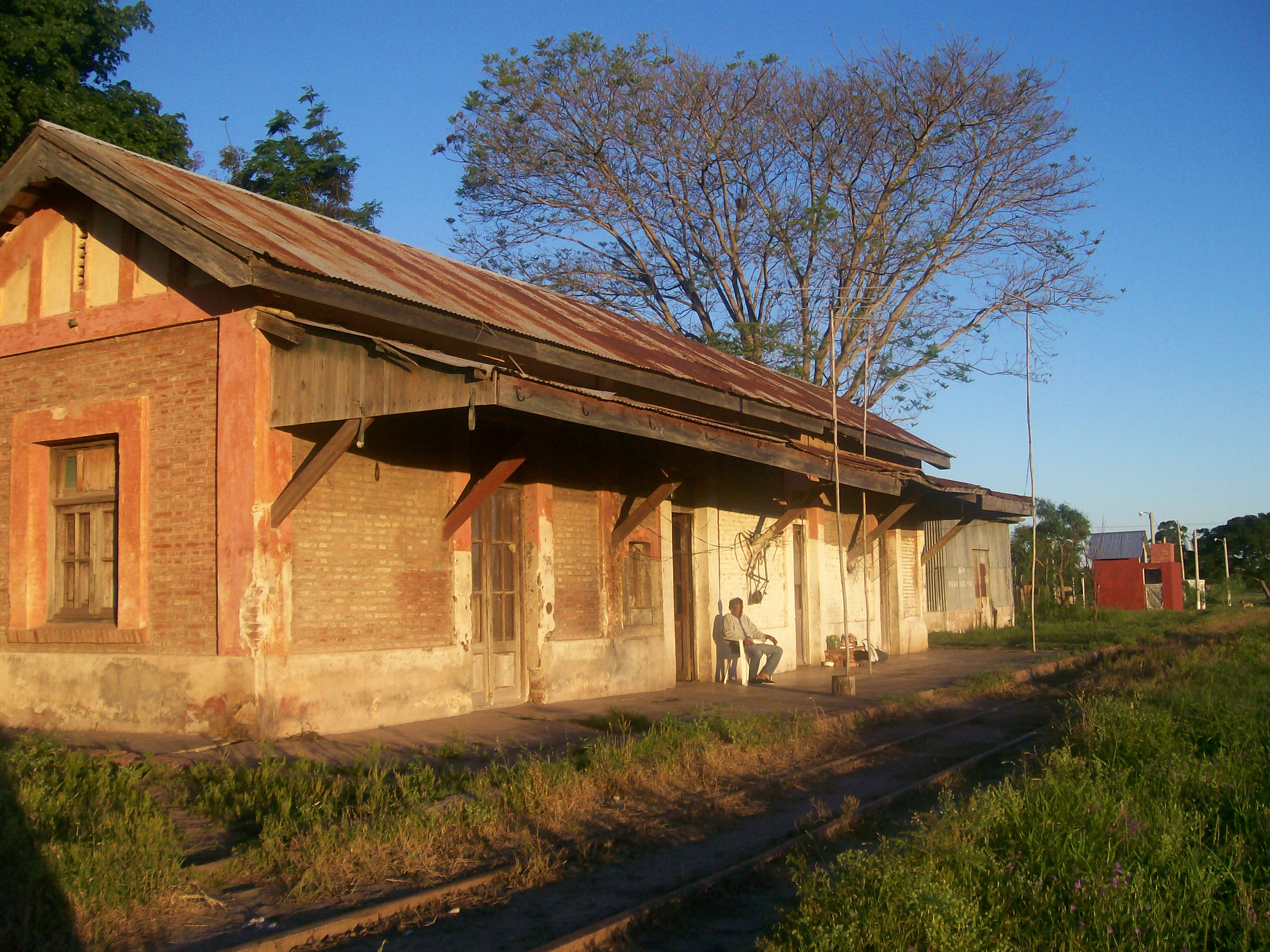
- Interactive map of Laguna Blanca (Chaco)
- Country: Argentina
- Province: Chaco Province
- Time zone: UTC−3 (ART)

Laguna Blanca is a village and municipality in Chaco Province in northern Argentina.
