= Theodore de Laguna =

American philosopher (1876–1930)

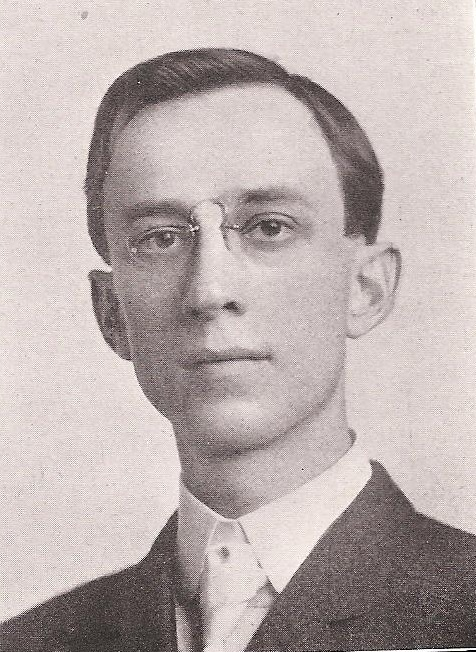
- de Laguna in 1906
- Born: Theodore de Leo de Laguna; July 22, 1876; Oakland, California, US
- Died: September 22, 1930 (aged 54); Hardwick, Vermont, US
- Education: UC Berkeley BA, MA (1899) Cornell University PhD (1901)
- Occupation: Philosopher
- Spouse: Grace Mead Andrus m. 1905

Theodore de Leo de Laguna (July 22, 1876 – September 22, 1930) was an American philosopher who taught for years at Bryn Mawr College and was known as an early feminist.

== Biography ==
Theodore de Leo de Laguna was born on 22 July 1876 in Oakland, California.

He was the son of Alexander Francisco Lopez de Leo de Laguna, a French-born educator and businessman, and Fredericke (Bergner) de Laguna of Saxony. His mother died young, and he was raised by his older sister Frederica.

He received a B.A. from the University of California, Berkeley, in 1896, an M.A. in 1899, and a Ph.D. in philosophy from Cornell University in 1901.

In 1901 he volunteered as a teacher in the Philippines in the aftermath of the Spanish–American War.

Upon his return he taught at Cornell, where he met and, in 1905, married Grace Mead Andrus.

In 1905, he accepted a position as a professor at the University of Michigan.

In 1907 Theodore began teaching philosophy at Bryn Mawr College. His wife would also join the department in 1912.

He died on 22 September 1930. His wife, would succeed to him as chair of the department and live on until 1978.

Theodore and Grace had two children. A daughter, the anthropologist Frederica de Laguna (1906-2004), and a son, the geologist Wallace de Laguna (1910-1980).

== Works ==
=== Books ===
- (with Grace de Laguna) Dogmatism and Evolution:Studies in Modern Philosophy (1910)
- Introduction to the Science of Ethics (1914)
- The Factors of Social Evolution (1926)

=== Select journal papers ===
- (1915) ’The Postulates of Deductive Logic’, The Journal of Philosophy, 12(9), pp. 225–236.
- (2019) ‘A Nominalistic Interpretation of Truth’ (edited by J. Katzav) British Journal for the History of Philosophy 27:5, pp. 1034–1040
