= Lagunitas Formation =

Lagunitas Formation may refer to:

- Lagunitas Formation, Cuba, an Early Miocene geologic formation of Cuba
- Lagunitas Formation, Colombia, a Cretaceous geologic formation of Colombia, in the Cesar-Ranchería Basin
- Lagunitas Sandstone, a member of the Bartonian Verdun Formation, a fossiliferous stratigraphic unit in Peru
