= Las Lagunas, San Luis =

Coordinates: 32°36′S 65°33′W

Las Lagunas (San Luis)
- Municipality and village
- Interactive map of Las Lagunas (San Luis)
- Country: Argentina
- Province: San Luis Province
- Time zone: UTC−3 (ART)

Las Lagunas (San Luis) is a village and municipality in San Luis Province in central Argentina.
