= Laguna Blanca (California) =

Lake in the state of California, United States

- Location within California
- Location: Santa Barbara County, California
- Coordinates: 34°25′53″N 119°45′35″W
- Type: lake

Laguna Blanca is a lake in the Hope Ranch area of Santa Barbara County, California, United States. It is surrounded by La Cumbre Golf and Country Club.

== See also ==
- Laguna Blanca School
- List of lakes in California
