= Lautaro Fernández =

Argentine footballer

Personal information
- Full name: Lautaro Eloy Fernández Cipolla
- Date of birth: 7 September 1993 (age 33)
- Place of birth: Santa Rosa, Argentina
- Height: 1.79 m (5 ft 10 in)
- Position: Forward

Team information
- Current team: Rieti

Youth career
- –2013: All Boys

Senior career*
Years	Team	Apps	(Gls)
2013–2015	All Boys	13	(0)
2015–2016	Platense	4	(0)
2016–2017	Troina		
2017	Mons Calpe	7	(0)
2017–2018	Troina		
2018–2019	Mons Calpe	13	(1)
2019–2020	Troina	25	(7)
2020	Licata	2	(0)
2020–2021	Giugliano	8	(2)
2021	Castrovillari	22	(2)
2021	Gravina	7	(0)
2021–2022	Lanusei	20	(3)
2022	Paternò	13	(5)
2022–2023	Dolomiti	7	(0)
2023–2024	Rotonda	32	(10)
2024	Sarnese	9	(0)
2024–2025	Cairese	28	(2)
2025–	Rieti		
- * Club domestic league appearances and goals as of 23 November 2025

Lautaro Eloy Fernández Cipolla (born 7 September 1993) is an Argentine footballer who plays as a forward for Italian Eccellenza club Rieti.
