= Frederica de Laguna =

American ethnologist, anthropologist, and archaeologist

Frederica Annis Lopez de Leo de Laguna
- Frederica de Laguna in 1993.
- Born: October 3, 1906; Ann Arbor, Michigan
- Died: October 6, 2004 (aged 98); Haverford, Pennsylvania
- Other name: Freddy
- Citizenship: American
- Education: Phoebe Anne Thorne School, Bryn Mawr College, Columbia University
- Known for: Under Mount Saint Elias: The History and Culture of the Yakutat Tlingit
- Scientific career
- Fields: anthropology, archaeology, ethnology
- Workplaces: Bryn Mawr College
- Thesis: "A Comparison of Eskimo and Palaeolithic Art" (1933)

Frederica ("Freddy") Annis Lopez de Leo de Laguna (October 3, 1906 – October 6, 2004) was an American ethnologist, anthropologist, and archaeologist influential for her work on Paleoindian and Alaska Native art and archaeology in the American northwest and Alaska.

She founded and chaired the anthropology department at Bryn Mawr College from 1938 to 1972 and served as vice-president of the Society for American Archaeology (SAA) from 1949 to 1950 and as president of the American Anthropological Association (AAA) from 1966 to 1967. De Laguna's honors include Bryn Mawr College's Lindback Award for Distinguished Teaching in 1972; her election into the National Academy of Sciences as the first woman, with former classmate Margaret Mead, in 1975; the Distinguished Service Award from the AAA in 1986; a potlatch from the people of Yakutat in 1996; and the Lucy Wharton Drexel Medal from the University of Pennsylvania in 1999.

== Early life and education ==
De Laguna was born to Theodore Lopez de Leo de Laguna and Grace Mead (Andrus) de Laguna, philosophy professors at Bryn Mawr College, on October 3, 1906, in Ann Arbor, Michigan. She was home-schooled by her parents until age nine due to frequent illness. She joined her parents and younger brother Wallace on two sabbaticals during her childhood: Cambridge and Oxford, England in 1914–1915 and France in 1921–1922.

De Laguna attended Bryn Mawr College on a scholarship from 1923 to 1927, graduating summa cum laude with a degree in politics and economics. Although she was awarded the college's European fellowship, she deferred for a year to study anthropology at Columbia University under Franz Boas, Gladys Reichard, and Ruth Benedict. In 1928, de Laguna traveled to England, France, and Spain, where she gained fieldwork experience under George Grant MacCurdy, "attended lectures on prehistoric art by Abbe Breuil, and received guidance from Paul Rivet and Marcellin Boule." In June 1929, de Laguna sailed to Greenland as Therkel Mathiassen's assistant on the country's "first scientific archaeological excavation." Staying a total of six months, the excavation convinced her of a future in anthropology and later became the subject of Voyage to Greenland: A Personal Initiation into Anthropology (1997).

De Laguna received her PhD in anthropology from Columbia University in 1933.

== Career ==
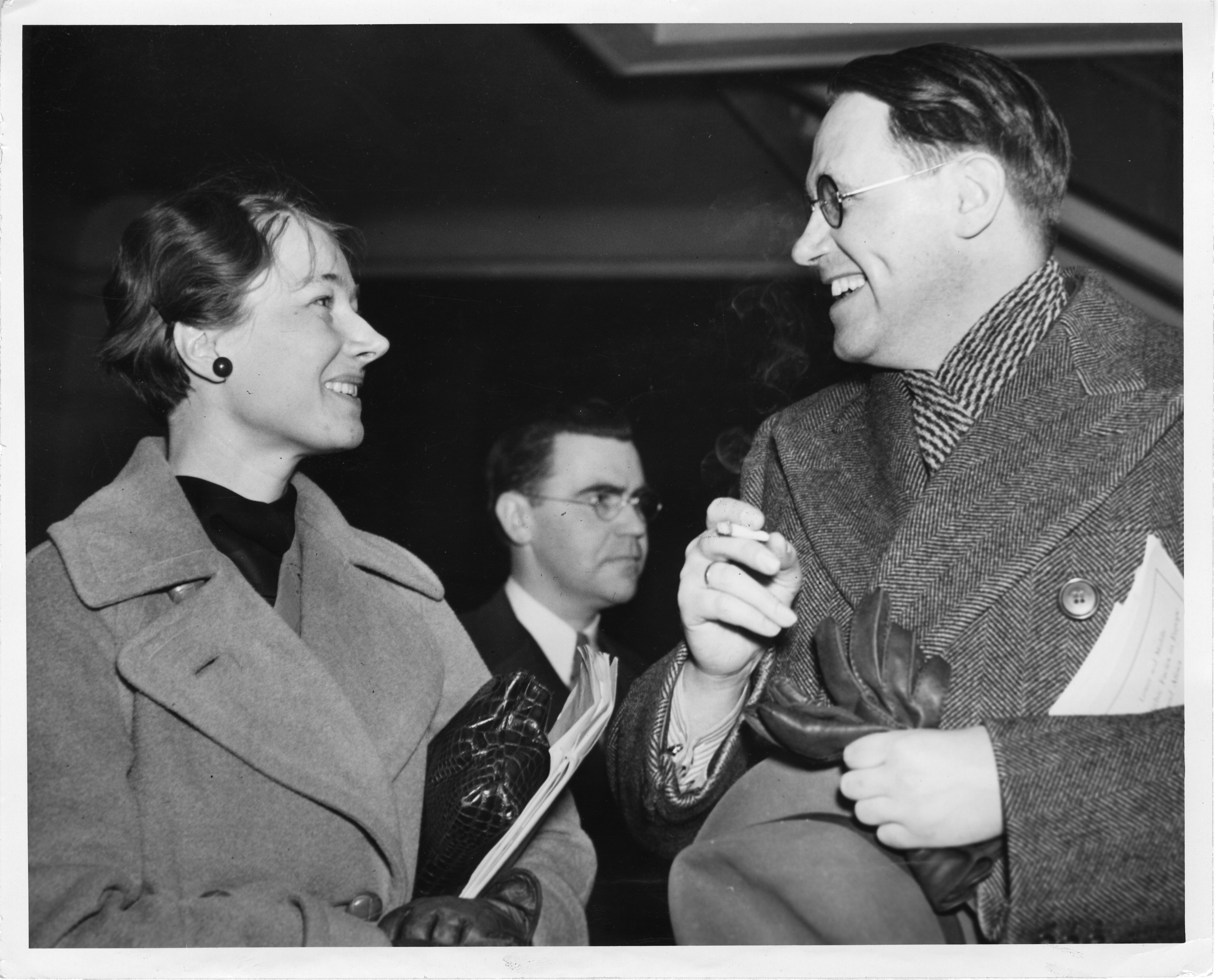
Frederica Annis Lopez de Leo de Laguna at a 1937 symposium with Kaj Birket-Smith (right), where they presented a joint paper on Alaskan ethnology.

De Laguna's first funded expedition was to Prince William Sound and Cook Inlet, Alaska, in 1930 after Kaj Birket-Smith fell ill and was unable to continue with de Laguna as his research assistant. De Laguna instead secured funding from the University of Pennsylvania Museum and brought her brother Wallace, who was a geologist, as an assistant. The following year, the museum hired de Laguna to catalog their Eskimo collections and again financed two excavations to Cook Inlet in 1931 and 1932. She co-led an archaeological and ethnological expedition to Prince William Sound in 1933 with Birket-Smith; the trip became the basis for "The Eyak Indians of the Copper River Delta, Alaska" (1938). De Laguna next explored the lower Yukon Valley and Tanana River in 1935 and published two works as a result: Travels Among the Dena (1994) and Tales from the Dena (1997). In the 1930s De Laguna wrote two mystery novels which helped to finance her research: The Arrow Points to Murder (1937) and Fog on the Mountain (1938).

Bryn Mawr College hired de Laguna as a sociology lecturer in 1938 "to teach the first ever anthropology course." She kept this position until 1942, when she took a leave of absence to serve in the naval reserve as a lieutenant commander of Women Accepted for Voluntary Emergency Service (WAVES). She taught naval history and codes and ciphers to women midshipmen at Smith College until the war's end in 1945. She resumed her professorial duties at Bryn Mawr College and then returned to the Northern Tlingit region of Alaska in the 1950s, leading to her "comprehensive three-volume monograph...considered [to be] the authoritative work on the Yakutat Tlingit." Although retired in 1975, de Laguna remained active in her profession through a trip to Upernavik, Greenland (resulting in the completion of George Thornton Emmons' The Tlingit Indians [1991]), volunteer work for the U.S. Forest Service in Alaska, and the establishment of the Frederica de Laguna Northern Books Press.

De Laguna also worked as an Associate Soil Conservationist in 1935 and 1936 on the Pima Indian Reservation, Arizona; as a teacher at an archaeological field school in 1941 under the sponsorship of Bryn Mawr College and the Museum of Northern Arizona; and as a visiting professor at the University of Pennsylvania from 1947 to 1949 and from 1972 to 1976 and at the University of California, Berkeley from 1959 to 1960 and from 1972 to 1973. Over 5,000 objects collected during her anthropological career are housed in the collections of the Penn Museum.

== Selected works ==
- 1930, The thousand march: Adventures of an American boy with the Garibaldi. Boston: Little, Brown. OCLC 3940490
- 1937, The arrow points to murder. Garden City, NJ: Crime Club, Inc. OCLC 1720968
- 1938, Fog on the mountain. Homer, AK: Kachemak Country Publications. OCLC 32748448
- 1972, Under Mount Saint Elias: The history and culture of the Yakutat Tlingit: Part one, pdf. Smithsonian contributions to anthropology, v. 7. Washington, D.C.: Smithsonian Institution Press. OCLC 603795
- 1977, Voyage to Greenland: A personal initiation in anthropology. New York: Norton. OCLC 2646088
- 1991, with George Thornton Emmons, The Tlingit Indians. New York: American Museum of Natural History. OCLC 23463915
- 1994, with Norman Reynolds and Dale DeArmond, Tales from the Dena: Indian stories from the Tanana, Koyukuk, and Yukon rivers. Seattle, WA: University of Washington Press. OCLC 31518221
- 1997, Travels among the Dena: Exploring Alaska's Yukon valley. Seattle, WA: University of Washington Press. OCLC 42772476
