= Chinle Creek =

Stream in Apache County, Arizona and San Juan County, Utah

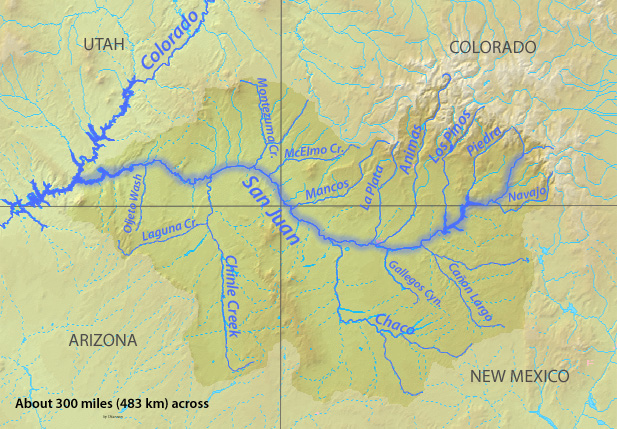
Map of the San Juan Basin showing the Chinle Creek

Chinle Creek is a tributary stream of the San Juan River in Apache County, Arizona and San Juan County, Utah. Its source is at, the confluence of Laguña Creek and the Chinle Wash arroyo. Its name is derived from the Navajo word ch'inili meaning 'where the waters came out. Its sources is in Canyon de Chelly National Monument where Canyon de Chelly and Canyon del Muerto have their confluence at an elevation of 5,616 feet at . It then trends northwest to its confluence with Laguña Creek where it forms Chinle Creek, 7 miles northeast of Dennehotso, Arizona at an elevation of 4,774 feet (1,455 meters).

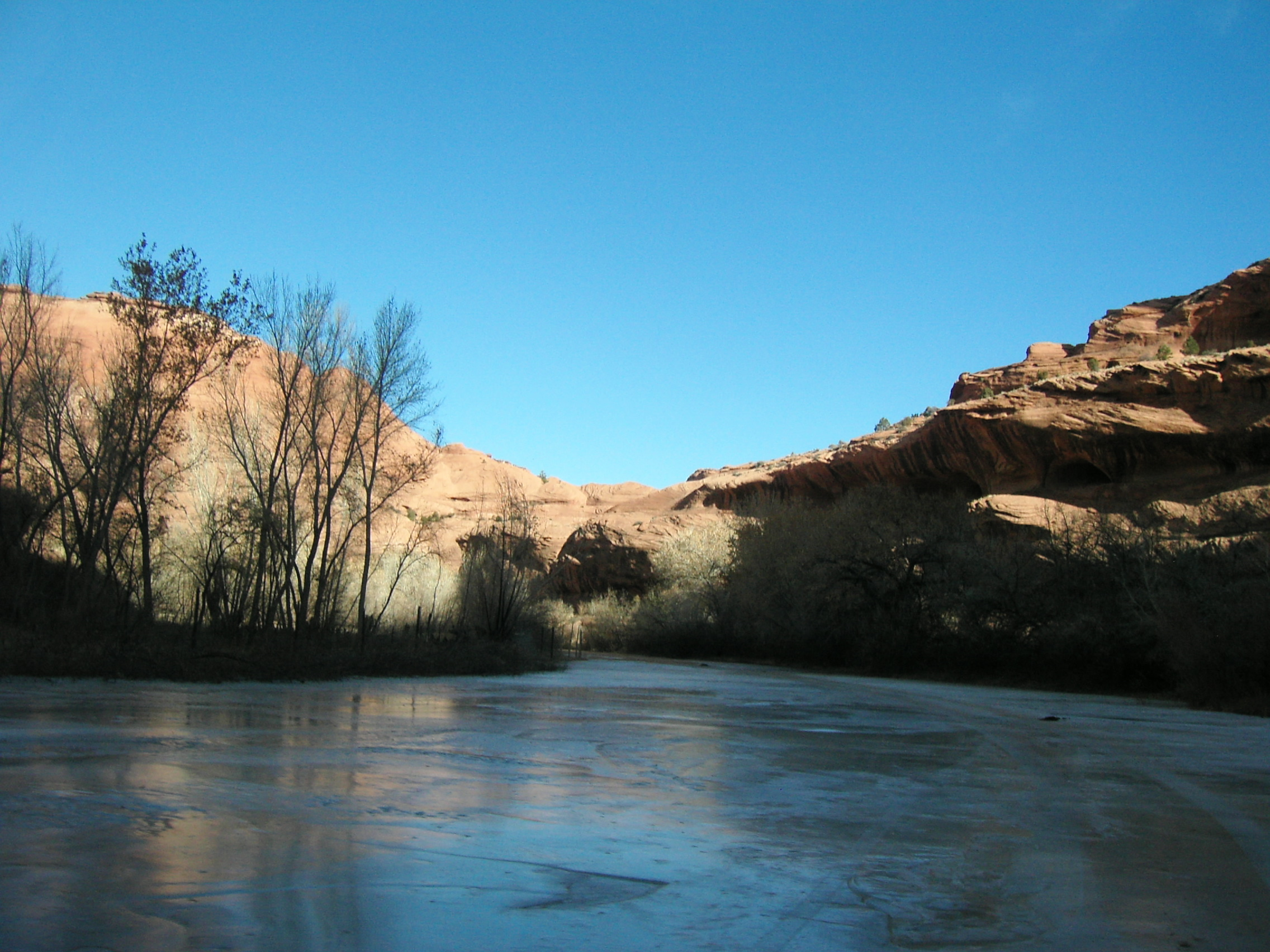
Chinle Wash (frozen) in 2005, 7 miles northeast of Dennehotso, Arizona at an elevation of 4,774 feet (1,455 m)

Its mouth is at its confluence with the San Juan River at at an elevation of 4,229 feet (1,289 m), 9 miles northeast of Mexican Hat, Utah.

== See also ==
- List of rivers of Arizona
- List of rivers of Utah
