= Gibraltar Division 2 Cup =

- Region: Gibraltar
- Number of teams: 7 teams from Second Division
- Current champions: Bruno's Magpies (2018–19)
- Most successful club(s): Europa Point; PwC Laguna; Glacis United Reserves (2 titles)
- 2018–19 Gibraltar Division 2 Cup

The Gibraltar Division 2 Cup is a special football tournament exclusively organized for clubs participating in the Second Division.

On 2 March 2017 the Gibraltar Football Association announced the signing of a sponsorship agreement with Chestertons Gibraltar, due to which the competition was renamed "The Chestertons Cup". Chestertons Gibraltar became the first sponsor of the competition since its inception. No tournament as held in 2018 due to redevelopments at Victoria Stadium, but the competition returned in the 2018–19 season.

== Participating teams 2018–19 ==
Club	Manager	Captain	Kit supplier	Sponsor	2017–18
Bruno's Magpies	(Scotland) David Wilson	(Scotland) Ross Gray	Nike	GVC Holdings; Chestertons	3rd
College 1975	(Gibraltar) Nolan Bosio	(Gibraltar) Nazim Hughes	Joma		7th
Europa Point	(Spain) José Ramón Rojas Escalona	(Gibraltar) Stefan Oliva	Luanvi	Sunborn Yacht Hotels	4th
Hound Dogs	(Gibraltar) Chris Gomez	(Gibraltar) Ivan Borg	Joma	The Calpe Hounds	8th
Leo FC	(Spain) Francisco Sanchez	(France) Clément Loubière	Errea		5th
Manchester 62	(Gibraltar) Jonathan Sodi	(Argentina) Christian Toncheff	Joma	CEPSA GIB	10th, GPD
Olympique 13	(Germany) Ángel Parla-Díaz	(Gibraltar) Andrew Lopez	Uhlsport	Hungry Monkey	2nd

== List of winners ==
- 2005 Glacis United Res.
- 2012 Lynx
- 2006 PwC Laguna
- 2014 Lions Pilots F.C.
- 2007 Glacis United Res.
- 2015 Europa Point
- 2008 PwC Laguna
- 2016 Europa Point
- 2010 Europa
- 2017 Gibraltar Phoenix
- 2011 Rock Cosmos
- 2018–19 Bruno's Magpies

== Titles by club ==
Club	Titles	Years
Europa Point	2	2015, 2016
PwC Laguna	2	2006, 2008
Glacis United Res.	2	2005, 2007
Bruno's Magpies	1	2018–19
Gibraltar Phoenix	1	2017
Lions Pilots	1	2014
Lynx	1	2012
Rock Cosmos	1	2011
Europa	1	2010

== See also ==
- Gibraltar Second Division
