= Aaron Payas =

Gibraltarian footballer

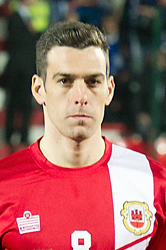
- Aaron Payas at the Victoria Stadium in March 2014

Personal information
- Full name: Aaron Payas
- Date of birth: 24 May 1985 (age 41)
- Place of birth: Gibraltar
- Position: Midfielder

Youth career
- Manchester United (Gibraltar)

Senior career*
Years	Team	Apps	(Gls)
200?–2007	Manchester United (Gibraltar)		
2007–2010	Laguna		
2010	Manchester United (Gibraltar)		
2010–2012	Lincoln Red Imps		
2012	Glacis United		
2012–2014	Lincoln Red Imps	5	(2)
2014–2017	Manchester 62	67	(9)
2018–2019	Europa	14	(0)
2019–2020	Bruno's Magpies	3	(0)

International career^{‡}
2005–2013	Gibraltar XI (Non-FIFA)	15	(2)
2013–2017	Gibraltar	11	(0)
- * Club domestic league appearances and goals as of 21:02, 20 September 2019 (UTC) ‡ National team caps and goals as of 12 February 2017

Aaron Payas (born 24 May 1985) is a Gibraltarian footballer who plays for Bruno's Magpies previously and the Gibraltar national team, where he plays as a midfielder.

== International career ==
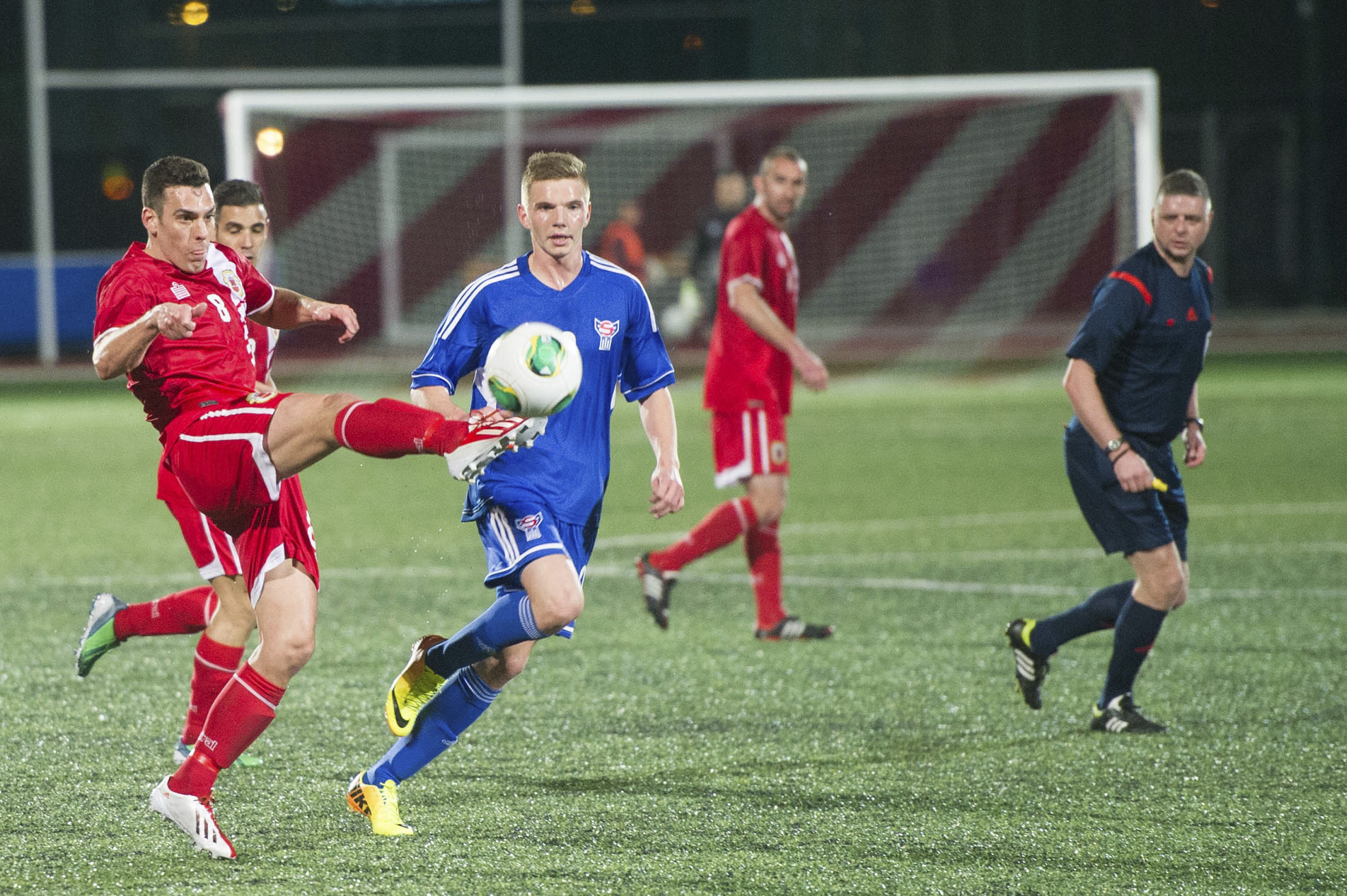
Payas playing for Gibraltar against the Faroe Islands on his début.

Payas was first called up to the Gibraltar senior team in February 2014 for friendlies against Faroe Islands and Estonia on 1 and 5 March 2014. He made his international début with Gibraltar on 1 March 2014 in a 4-1 home loss with the Faroe Islands. His second appearance came a 2-0 home loss to Estonia on 5 March 2014.

=== International goals ===
Scores and results list Gibraltar's goal tally first.

No	Date	Venue	Opponent	Score	Result	Competition
1.	29 June 2009	Solvallen, Eckerö, Åland	Frøya	8–0	8–0	2011 Island Games
2.	27 June 2011	Peter Henry Ground, Brading, Isle of Wight	Ynys Môn	1–0	6–3	2011 Island Games

== Personal life ==
Outside of football Aaron is a lawyer for Hassans, the biggest law firm in Gibraltar.
