= Grace de Laguna =

American philosopher (1878–1978)

Grace Mead de Laguna
- Born: Grace Mead Andrus; September 28, 1878; East Berlin, Connecticut, United States
- Died: February 17, 1978 (aged 99); Devon, Pennsylvania, United States
- Education: Cornell University
- Occupation: Academic Philosopher
- Employer: Bryn Mawr College
- Spouse: Theodore de Laguna m. 1905
- Children: Frederica de Laguna, Wallace de Laguna

Grace Mead de Laguna (28 September 1878 – 17 February 1978) was an American philosopher who taught at Bryn Mawr College in Pennsylvania.

== Life ==
Grace Mead Andrus was born on 28 September 1878 in East Berlin, Connecticut. She was the youngest child, and only daughter, of Wallace R. Andrus and Annis Andrus (née Mead). Both parents were of Connecticut ancestry dating back to the 17th century. Her mother, Annis, had been a school teacher. Her father had served with the 17th Connecticut Volunteers during the Civil War, He would later work as a land agent for the Northern Pacific Railway whilst it was being built. This led to the family moving, whilst Grace was young, to the (then) Washington Territory, first to Cheney, then Tacoma, where she received a pioneer upbringing.

Grace Andrus took the AB from Cornell University in 1903, where she was Phi Beta Kappa. And, upon presentation of a dissertation titled “The Mechanical Theory in Pre-Kantian Rationalism”, she received her PhD in philosophy there in 1906.

Whilst studying for the latter she met Theodore de Laguna, an instructor there, whom she married in 1905.

After holding a position at the University of Michigan from 1905, Theodore served, from 1907, as a professor of philosophy at Bryn Mawr College in Pennsylvania. Grace became an assistant professor there in 1912, an associate professor in 1916 and a full professor in 1928. She became chair of philosophy at Bryn Mawr after Theodore's death in 1930. She would retire as Professor Emerita in 1944. She continued to write, publishing her third book in 1963.

Her daughter, born in 1906, was the anthropologist Frederica de Laguna, whom Grace would accompany on several anthropological field trips. Her son Wallace de Laguna, who was born in 1910, was a geologist who worked for the U.S. Geological Survey and later for the Oak Ridge National Laboratories in Tennessee.

Grace de Laguna died, aged 99, on 17 February 1978 in Devon, Pennsylvania.

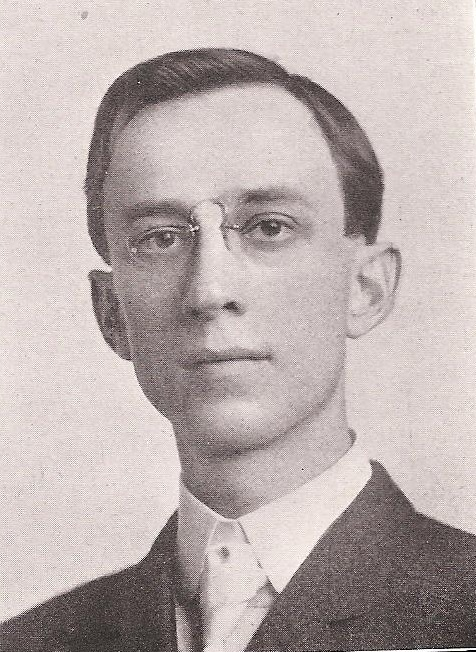
Theodore de Laguna

== Works ==
Books

- Dogmatism and Evolution: Studies in Modern Philosophy, with Theodore de Laguna (New York, 1910). [At Internet Archive]
- Speech: Its Function and Evolution (New Haven, Conn., 1927). [At Internet Archive]
- On Existence and the Human World (New Haven, Conn., 1963).

Articles/Book chapters

- The Practical Character of Reality in The Philosophical Review, vol. 18, no. 4, 1909, pp. 396–415. JSTOR 2177776
- Phenomena and Their Determination in The Philosophical Review, vol. 26, no. 6, 1917, pp. 622–633. JSTOR 2178030
- The Limits of the Physical in Philosophical Essays in Honor of James Edwin Creighton (1917) [At Internet Archive]
- Internet Archive
