= Kelvin Morgan =

Gibraltarian professional footballer

Personal information
- Full name: Kelvin John Morgan
- Date of birth: 14 November 1997 (age 28)
- Place of birth: Gibraltar
- Height: 1.90 m (6 ft 3 in)
- Position: Forward

Team information
- Current team: Lynx
- Number: 19

Youth career
- Europa

Senior career*
Years	Team	Apps	(Gls)
2014–2016	Europa	1	(0)
2016–2018	Manchester 62	20	(2)
2018–2019	Bruno's Magpies	8	(6)
2019–2020	Mons Calpe	16	(4)
2020–2021	Bruno's Magpies	17	(7)
2021–2023	St Joseph's	18	(3)
2022	→ Bruno's Magpies (loan)	9	(1)
2024	Europa Point	6	(1)
2025–	Lynx	20	(2)

International career^{‡}
2021–	Gibraltar	5	(0)
- * Club domestic league appearances and goals as of 8 November 2026 ‡ National team caps and goals as of 17 November 2025

Kelvin John Morgan (born 14 November 1997) is a Gibraltarian professional footballer who plays as a forward for Gibraltarian club Lynx and the Gibraltar national team.

== International career ==
Morgan made his international debut for Gibraltar on 4 June 2021 against Slovenia.
