= Coyote Valley, California =

Area in Northern California, U.S.

Coordinates: 37°11′N 121°42′W

Coyote Valley
- A view across the Coyote Valley towards Morgan Hill from Santa Teresa County Park, April 1, 2006
- Floor elevation: 260 feet (79 m) at Coyote, California
- Length: 7 m (23 ft) Northwest to Southeast
- Width: 2 m (6 ft 7 in)

Geography
- Location: California
- Population centers: San Jose, California; Coyote, California; Morgan Hill, California
- Borders on: Mount Hamilton, Diablo Range (east); Foothills of Santa Cruz Mountains (west); San Jose (north); Morgan Hill, California (south)
- Traversed by: U.S. Highway 101, Monterey Highway
- Interactive map of Coyote Valley

Coyote Valley is an area located in a narrowing of the southern Santa Clara Valley, in Northern California. Coyote Valley is approximately 7,400 acres (2,995 ha) in size and largely composed of farmland, orchards, open space preserves, and homes. Coyote Valley is generally divided into three sections: North Coyote Valley (which is part of San Jose), the unincorporated village of Coyote, California (which is located in North Coyote Valley), and South Coyote Valley (which is part of Morgan Hill).

Coyote Valley is one of the largest greenbelts in the San Francisco Bay Area. Much of Coyote Valley is preserved as open space, nature reserve, or protected farmland. The area was threatened by large-scale development in the early 2000s, which drew criticism from the public, resulting in the abandonment of the redevelopment plans and the establishment of the conservation policy which governs the valley. The Coyote Gap at the extreme north end of Coyote Valley is a critical wildlife corridor for safe passage of animals from the Diablo Range in the east to the Santa Cruz Mountains in the west, as Coyote Valley is the narrowest point between the two mountain ranges. In 2021, the San Jose City Council and Santa Clara County Board of Supervisors voted to protect Coyote Valley for open space and agricultural uses.

== Geography ==
Coyote Valley is a floodplain approximately 11.2 kilometres (7.0 mi) and 3.2 kilometres (2.0 mi) wide, situated in a narrow constriction in Santa Clara Valley between the Diablo Range to the east and the Santa Cruz Mountains to the west. It includes the Coyote Gap at its north end, the narrowest gap between the two mountain ranges at only 0.37 miles (0.60 km) across. North Coyote Valleycontains the largest freshwater wetland in Santa Clara County, Laguna Seca, a mostly seasonal lake important to groundwater recharge. Coyote Valley was named a “2001 Last Chance Landscape of America the Beautiful", one of the ten most endangered American landscapes by Scenic America. The only landscape selected from California, Scenic America described Coyote Valley as: “Coyote Valley is a rare scenic break in an otherwise urbanized area... The rolling hills, blossoming orchards, and grand oaks provide respite to visitors, residents, and myriad species of wildlife."

Coyote Valley is largely split between San Jose and Morgan Hill, but also includes the tiny unincorporated community of Coyote, California. It can be divided at Bailey Avenue into North Coyote Valley, which has San Jose addresses and includes the village of Coyote, and South Coyote Valley, which has Morgan Hill addresses.

== Ecology ==
The current width of the wildlife corridor through the Coyote Valley is 2 kilometres (1.2 mi). This is considered the minimum width for a viable wildlife corridor for multiple species.

De Anza College wildlife biologists and students have monitored wildlife in the Coyote Valley since December 2007. They have recorded 160 species of birds, 25 of which either are rare, have special status, or both. Because development and the multilane U.S. Highway 101 pose barriers to migration of mammals such as tule elk (Cervus elaphus nannoides), puma (Puma concolor), coyote (Canis latrans), bobcat (Lynx rufus), gray fox (Urocyon cinereoargenteus), American badger (Taxidea taxus), etc. the Coyote Valley and its permeable multiple highway underpasses/culverts serve as the last remaining safe passages between the mountains to the west and east. De Anza students have used motion activated cameras to document that these passages are used by deer, bobcats, puma, coyote, and other large mammals.

Tule elk were re-introduced to Mount Hamilton from 1978 to 1981. The elk that live on the Mount Hamilton/Diablo side of the valley have been documented lining up near Highway 101, unable to cross.

Coyote Valley’s vernal pools offer a safe haven to many amphibian species such as the California tiger salamander (Ambystoma californiense) and the California red-legged frog (Rana draytonii).

Coyote Valley is traversed by Coyote Creek, an important stream for steelhead trout (Oncorhynchus mykiss) spawning runs.

== Potential development ==
Coyote Valley is home to large areas of orchards and farms, although that scene has been expected to change for decades. The Dahlin Group, based in San Ramon, California, was chosen by the City of San Jose to create a master plan for the area. Dahlin Group's Conceptual Plan called for at least 50,000 jobs and 25,000 homes, an international garden, a 54-acre (22 ha) central lake, a hub and spoke Bus Rapid Transit system, and a green belt between the new town and Morgan Hill.

Citing costs and delays, developers stopped funding the planning process in March 2008.

=== Environmental impacts of development ===
To determine the effects of development in the Coyote Valley, a Draft Environmental Impact Report, or DEIR was released in March 2007. San Jose is the only city in Santa Clara County that allows developers to hand pick the environmental consultants who write the environmental impact reports for proposed projects. They can hire the companies directly, and hand in the reports with their application. When the DEIR was unveiled to the public, an unprecedented amount of criticism was generated with more than 1,000 pages of negative comments. These objections came from 55 organizations and individuals, and 28 public agencies including the U.S. Fish and Wildlife Service. The city decided to commission the remake of much of the Draft EIR. The revision work and other planning costs was estimated at 2.5 million dollars and to take over a year to complete. This controversy led to many residents of San Jose to call for an end to San Jose’s developer-controlled environmental impact reports.

City of San Jose Documents

- 10/18/2007 City of San Jose Memorandum: Update on Scope, Schedule and Budget for Revision and Recirculation of the Coyote Valley Specific Plan Draft Environmental Impact Report.
- 03/30/2007 Coyote Valley Specific Plan Environmental Impact Report (EIR)
- 06/29/2007 Draft Environmental Impact Report (DEIR) Comments Received

Articles

- 11/12/2007 "Running Wild"
- 10/17/2007 "Students Mobilize Against Valley Development"

=== Fiscal analysis ===
The Draft Fiscal Analysis for Coyote Valley development concludes that San Jose will make more money in tax revenues from development than it will spend on providing government services. It reaches this conclusion by assuming that residential property values and resulting taxes will increase 3% above inflation every year for 57 years.

The Committee for Green Foothills disputes this analysis, arguing that because household income has only increased 1% above inflation annually in San Jose, it is impossible for the cost of housing to continuously increase faster than the means to pay for housing costs. The Committee also argues the Draft Analysis overestimates income by failing to account for tax revenues "cannibalized" by businesses moving from other parts of San Jose to Coyote Valley.

=== Developers end specific plan ===
On March 18, 2008, the developer/landowners in Coyote Valley announced they would no longer fund the Specific Plan process, which terminates that planning process. Developers cited the costs and delays in planning, while news reports noted increased political opposition. Environmental groups claimed they found grossly inadequate environmental and fiscal analyses and claimed those flaws were factors that contributed to end the current proposal.

Other proposed developments remain possible in Coyote Valley, including the previously approved, but never built, Coyote Valley Research Park, and the proposed expansion of the Gavilan College campus. In 2017, Phase 1 of the Coyote Valley Center was completed, becoming Gavilan's newest instructional site and the home for South Bay Public Safety Training Consortium police and fire academies.

=== Coyote Valley Open Space Preserve established ===
In November 2019, the San Jose City Council voted to purchase 937 acres in northern Coyote Valley to be preserved for open space. The City of San Jose retained ownership of 296 acres, and the rest went to the Santa Clara Valley Open Space Authority, a government agency that operates public open space preserves.

=== Coyote Valley rezoning for open space and agriculture ===
In November 2021, the San Jose City Council voted to rezone northern Coyote Valley from industrial use to agricultural and open space use. In December 2021, the Santa Clara County Board of Supervisors voted to strengthen protections for mid- and southern Coyote Valley by designating a Climate Resilience District, protecting its open space and farmland by limiting development.

== See also ==
- Metcalf Energy Center
