= Laguña Creek =

Stream in Apache and Navajo counties in Arizona

Map

Laguña Creek also formerly also known as Tyende Creek, is a stream in the Navajo and Apache Counties of Arizona. Laguña Creek has its source at 36°41′15″N 110°30′36″W, at the confluence of Long Canyon and Dowozhiebito Canyon at an elevation of 6,325 feet (1,928 meters) at the head of Tsegi Canyon. Its mouth is in the Chinle Valley at its confluence with Chinle Wash which together forms Chinle Creek, at an elevation of 4,774 feet (1,455 meters). Chinle Creek is a tributary of San Juan River which is in turn a tributary of the Colorado River.
