= Laguna Beach, Florida =

- Census-designated place
- Location in Bay County and the state of Florida
- Coordinates: 30°14′59″N 85°56′22″W
- Country: United States
- State: Florida
- County: Bay

Area
  - Total: 2.74 sq mi (7.09 km^{2})
  - Land: 2.51 sq mi (6.51 km^{2})
  - Water: 0.22 sq mi (0.58 km^{2})
- Elevation: 23 ft (7.0 m)

Population (2020)
  - Total: 4,330
  - Density: 1,723.7/sq mi (665.52/km^{2})
- Time zone: UTC−06:00 (Central (CST))
  - Summer (DST): UTC−05:00 (CDT)
- FIPS code: 12-37500
- GNIS feature ID: 2403186

Laguna Beach is a census-designated place (CDP) in Bay County, Florida, United States. The population was 4,330 at the 2020 census, up from 3,932 at the 2010 census. It is part of the Panama City–Panama City Beach, Florida Metropolitan Statistical Area. Laguna Beach was named for the many coastal dune lakes unique to this area of Northwest Florida.

== Geography ==
According to the United States Census Bureau, the CDP has a total area of 2.6 square miles (6.8 km^{2}), of which 2.4 square miles (6.2 km^{2}) is land and 0.23 square miles (0.6 km^{2}), or 8.52%, is water.

== Demographics ==
Historical population
Census	Pop.	Note	%±
1990	1,876		—
2000	2,909		55.1%
2010	3,932		35.2%
2020	4,330		10.1%
U.S. Decennial Census

=== 2020 census ===
As of the 2020 census, Laguna Beach had a population of 4,330. The median age was 54.0 years. 12.6% of residents were under the age of 18 and 27.9% of residents were 65 years of age or older. For every 100 females there were 96.6 males, and for every 100 females age 18 and over there were 95.3 males age 18 and over.

100.0% of residents lived in urban areas, while 0.0% lived in rural areas.

There were 2,121 households in Laguna Beach, of which 16.5% had children under the age of 18 living in them. Of all households, 43.5% were married-couple households, 21.0% were households with a male householder and no spouse or partner present, and 27.3% were households with a female householder and no spouse or partner present. About 34.4% of all households were made up of individuals and 14.6% had someone living alone who was 65 years of age or older.

There were 5,219 housing units, of which 59.4% were vacant. The homeowner vacancy rate was 3.4% and the rental vacancy rate was 29.6%.

Racial composition as of the 2020 census
Race	Number	Percent
White	3,659	84.5%
Black or African American	58	1.3%
American Indian and Alaska Native	38	0.9%
Asian	45	1.0%
Native Hawaiian and Other Pacific Islander	4	0.1%
Some other race	183	4.2%
Two or more races	343	7.9%
Hispanic or Latino (of any race)	384	8.9%

=== 2010 census ===
As of the census of 2010, there were 3,932 people, 1,816 households, and 1,022 families residing in the CDP. The population density was 1,638.3 inhabitants per square mile (632.6/km^{2}). There were 4,607 housing units at an average density of 1,919.6 per square mile (741.2/km^{2}). The racial makeup of the CDP was 91.8% White, 1.1% African American, 1.2% American Indian or Alaska Native, 0.8% Asian, 0.1 Native Hawaiian or other Pacific Islander, 2.3% some other race, and 2.7% from two or more races. 5.8% of the population were Hispanic or Latino of any race.

There were 1,816 households, out of which 17.9% had children under the age of 18 living with them, 40.6% were headed by married couples living together, 8.9% had a female householder with no husband present, and 43.7% were non-families. 31.9% of all households were made up of individuals, and 11.1% were someone living alone who was 65 years of age or older. The average household size was 2.17, and the average family size was 2.66.

In the CDP, the population was spread out, with 16.3% under the age of 18, 7.8% from 18 to 24, 24.5% from 25 to 44, 31.9% from 45 to 64, and 19.5% who were 65 years of age or older. The median age was 45.7 years. For every 100 females, there were 102.6 males. For every 100 females age 18 and over, there were 102.8 males.

=== 2000 census ===
At the 2000 census, the median income for a household in the CDP was $34,875, and the median income for a family was $41,629. Males had a median income of $26,294 versus $20,488 for females. The per capita income for the CDP was $18,209. About 11.5% of families and 14.8% of the population were below the poverty line, including 17.2% of those under age 18 and 12.2% of those age 65 or over.
