= Laguna F.C. =

Former association football club in Gibraltar

Laguna FC
- Full name: Laguna Football Club
- Ground: Victoria Stadium
- League: Gibraltar Masters League
- 2024–25: Gibraltar Futsal Premier Division, 5th

bra

Laguna FC is a former football team from Gibraltar, and current futsal team, currently playing in the Gibraltar Masters League.

== History ==
They played in the Gibraltar Football League's First Division, spending a prolonged period as one of the stronger sides in the division behind the dominant Lincoln Red Imps. The side eventually withdrew from the football league. A futsal side continues to operate under the name Laguna 2007 Futsal Club (currently known as VR Solutions Laguna for sponsorship reasons). It left the Gibraltar Futsal Premier Division at the end of the 2024–25 season. In 2026, it joined the newly formed Gibraltar Masters League for over-35 footballers.

== Achievements ==
- Gibraltar Premier Cup: 1

2008–09

- Gibraltar Division 2 Cup: 2

2006, 2008

== Current futsal squad ==
Note: Flags indicate national team as defined under FIFA eligibility rules; some limited exceptions apply. Players may hold more than one non-FIFA nationality.

No.	Pos.	Nation	Player
2		GIB	Nevin Dellipiani
3		GIB	Kevagn Origo
4	GK	GIB	Sean Mascarenhas
5		GIB	Kaylan Rumbo
6		GIB	Nicholas Pecino
7		GIB	Christian Caetano
8		ITA	Emilio Sansolini
9		GIB	Tyron Tavares

No.	Pos.	Nation	Player
10		GIB	Carl Ellul
11		GIB	Dean Debono
12		GIB	Anthony Provasoli
14		GIB	Jovan Ocana
15		GIB	Kyle Bear
16		GIB	Philip Gillingwater-Pedersen
18		GIB	Brendan Ryan
25		GIB	Aaron Payas
