= Laguna Creek, Elk Grove, California =

- Former census-designated place District of Elk Grove
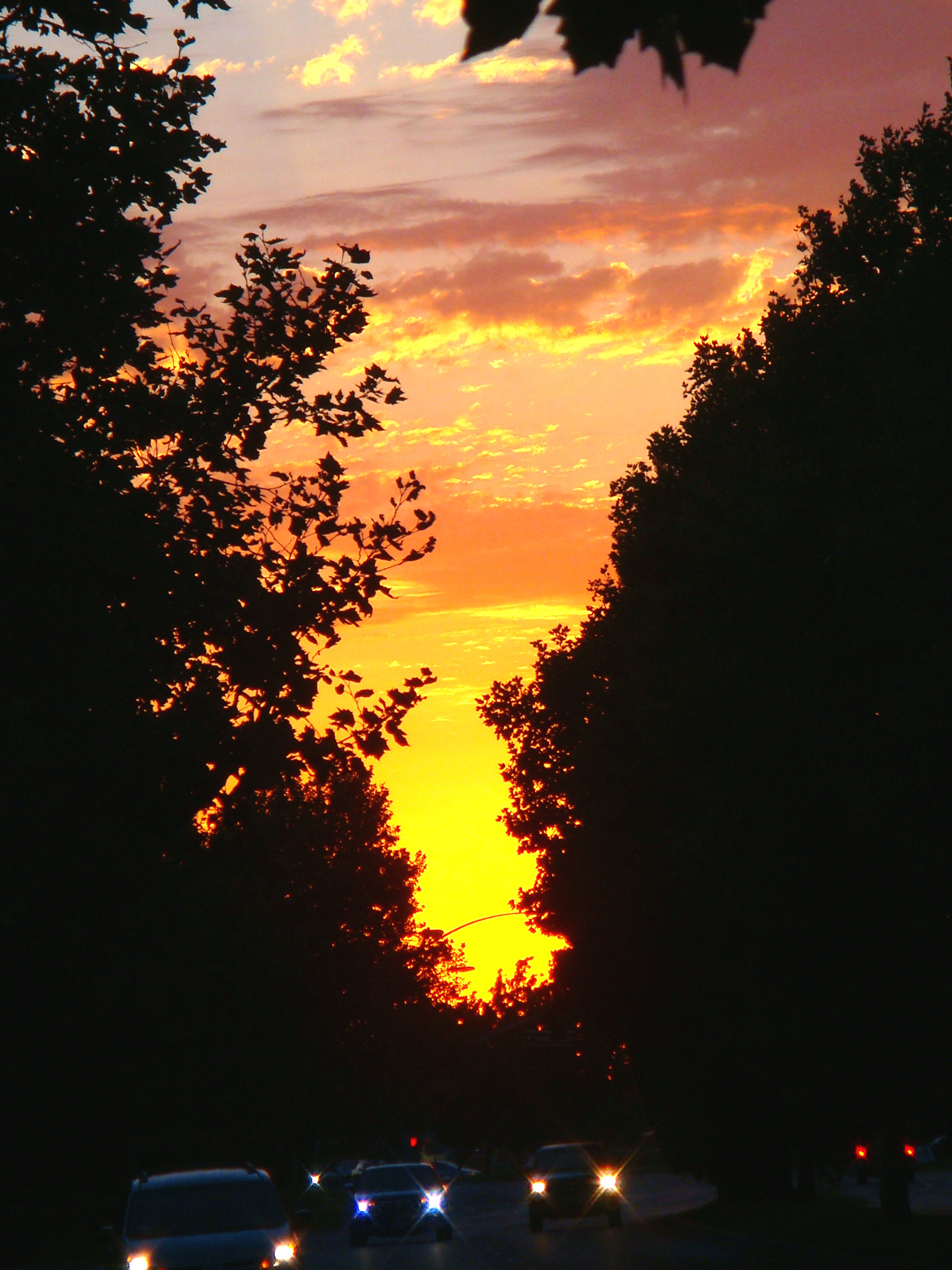
- Sunset on Laguna Blvd, Laguna Creek, Elk Grove, California

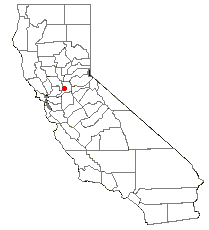
- Location of Laguna, Elk Grove, California
- Coordinates: 38°25′26″N 121°25′39″W
- Country: United States
- State: California
- County: Sacramento
- City: Elk Grove

Area
  - Total: 6.7 sq mi (17 km^{2})
  - Land: 6.7 sq mi (17 km^{2})
  - Water: 0.0 sq mi (0 km^{2})
- Elevation: 30 ft (9.1 m)

Population (2000)
  - Total: 34,309
  - Density: 5,100/sq mi (2,000/km^{2})
- Time zone: UTC-8 (PST)
  - Summer (DST): UTC-7 (PDT)
- ZIP code: 95757/95758
- Area codes: 916, 279
- FIPS code: 06-39173
- GNIS feature ID: 1867033

Laguna Creek is a former census-designated place (CDP) in Sacramento County, California, United States. It is now part of the incorporated City of Elk Grove.

== Geography ==
Laguna Creek is located at 38°25′26″N 121°25′39″W (38.423872, -121.427421).

According to the United States Census Bureau, the CDP has a total area of 6.8 square miles (18 km^{2}), all of it land.

== Demographics ==
As of the census of 2000, there were 34,309 people, 11,314 households, and 9,153 families residing in the CDP. The population density was 5,087.1 inhabitants per square mile (1,964.1/km^{2}). There were 11,610 housing units at an average density of 1,721.5 per square mile (664.7/km^{2}). The racial makeup of the CDP was 59.10% White, 9.70% African American, 0.66% Native American, 17.99% Asian, 0.36% Pacific Islander, 5.48% from other races, and 6.71% from two or more races. Hispanic or Latino of any race were 14.53% of the population.

There were 11,314 households, out of which 52.0% had children under the age of 18 living with them, 64.8% were married couples living together, 11.8% had a female householder with no husband present, and 19.1% were non-families. 14.6% of all households were made up of individuals, and 1.9% had someone living alone who was 65 years of age or older. The average household size was 3.03 and the average family size was 3.38.

In the CDP, the population was spread out, with 33.8% under the age of 18, 5.9% from 18 to 24, 37.8% from 25 to 44, 17.8% from 45 to 64, and 4.6% who were 65 years of age or older. The median age was 32 years. For every 100 females, there were 94.8 males. For every 100 females age 18 and over, there were 89.4 males.

The median income for a household in the CDP was $67,447, and the median income for a family was $70,804. Males had a median income of $51,604 versus $40,895 for females. The per capita income for the CDP was $25,280. About 3.4% of families and 4.3% of the population were below the poverty line, including 4.6% of those under age 18 and 5.7% of those age 65 or over.

== Politics ==
In the state legislature, Laguna Creek is in the 8th Senate Districts. The eighth is represented by Democrat State senator Angelique Ashby respectively, and in the 10th Assembly District, represented by Democrat Assemblymember Stephanie Nguyen.

Federally, Laguna Creek is in California's 7th congressional district, represented by Democrat Doris Matsui.
