= Rancho Refugio de la Laguna Seca =

Mexican land grant

Coordinates: 37.190°N 121.720°W

Rancho Laguna Seca (also called "Refugio de la Laguna Seca") was a 19,973-acre (80.83 km^{2}) Mexican land grant in present day Santa Clara County, California given in 1834 by Governor José Figueroa to Juan Alvires. "Laguna Seca" means "Dry Lake" in Spanish, and refers to the seasonal lake, Laguna Seca. The grant extended southward along Coyote Creek from Rancho Santa Teresa and Coyote to Rancho Ojo del Agua de la Coche and Morgan Hill.

== History ==
Juan Alvires was alcalde of San Jose from 1812-1813, Alcalde of Monterey in 1826, and alcalde of San Jose, again, in 1837. The four square league Rancho Laguna Seca was granted to Juan Alvires in 1834. As a result of financial difficulties, Rancho Laguna Seca was sold to William Fisher in 1845. William Gulnac, grantee of Rancho Campo de los Franceses and Fisher's brother-in-law, acted as Fisher's agent.

William Fisher (1810-1850) was born in England and settled in Massachusetts. In 1830 he left as mate on a vessel bound for the West Coast with a load of hides and tallow. He married Liberata Ceseña (1818 - 1905) in 1834 and continued his trading business in Baja California. In 1846 he decided to return, with his family, to Alta California and establish his home in the Pueblo of San José. William Fisher was offered, but declined, the office of alcalde, probably because of continuing poor health and his involvement in raising cattle on the rancho and operating his mercantile business in San Jose. In 1849, because of deteriorating health, William sold his mercantile store in San Jose to his clerk, Josiah Belden, and returned to the rancho, where he died in 1850, at the age of 40, leaving the rancho to his wife, Liberta Ceseña, and six children.

In 1851, Daniel Murphy, the youngest son of Martin Murphy Sr., owner of the adjacent Rancho Ojo del Agua de la Coche married Maria Fisher. In 1882, Diana, their precocious daughter, secretly married Hiram Morgan Hill. In 1851 Liberta Ceseña married Dr. George H. Bull, a medical doctor from Troy, New York.

With the cession of California to the United States following the Mexican-American War, the 1848 Treaty of Guadalupe Hidalgo provided that the land grants would be honored. As required by the Land Act of 1851, a claim for Rancho Laguna Seca was filed with the Public Land Commission in 1852, and the grant was patented to Liberta Ceseña Bull et al. (heirs of William Fisher) in 1865. A claim was filed by Juan Alvires with the Land Commission in 1853, but was rejected in 1855.

Dr. Bull died in 1854. In 1857 Liberta Bull sold her half share (9,986 acres (40.4 km^{2})) to her son-in-law, Daniel Murphy, and married Caesar Piatti in 1858. In 1858 Daniel Murphy filed a partition suit, resulting in a partition of 1,499 acres (6.1 km^{2}) to Thomas Fisher; 1,790 acres (7.2 km^{2}) to Cipriano Fisher; 1,795 acres (7.3 km^{2}) to W. Fisher; 1,348 acres (5.5 km^{2}) to Eulogia Fisher Rota (wife of Daniel Rota); 1,784 acres (7.2 km^{2}) to Fiacro Fisher; and 11,552 acres (46.7 km^{2}) to Daniel and Mary Murphy. In 1876 Eulogia Fisher sold her portion to Fiacro Fisher. Liberta resided on Rancho Laguna Seca until the death of Caesar Piatti in 1899.

== Historic sites of the Rancho ==
- Rancho del Refugio de la Laguna Seca, Stone Building. Constructed between 1860 and 1880.
