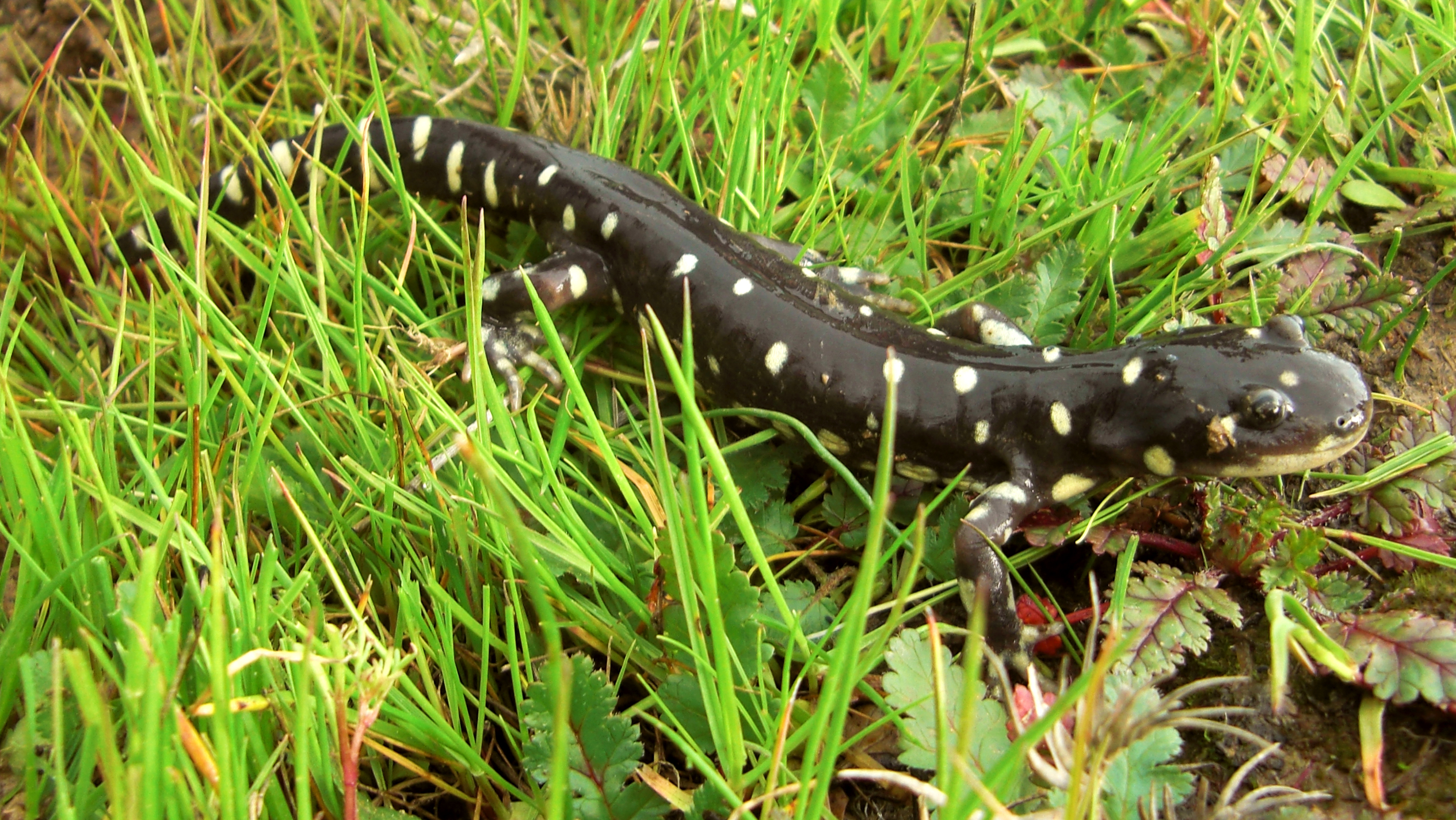

Conservation status
- Vulnerable (IUCN 3.1)

Scientific classification
- Kingdom: Animalia
- Phylum: Chordata
- Class: Amphibia
- Order: Urodela
- Family: Ambystomatidae
- Genus: Ambystoma
- Species: A. californiense

Binomial name
- Ambystoma californiense Gray, 1853
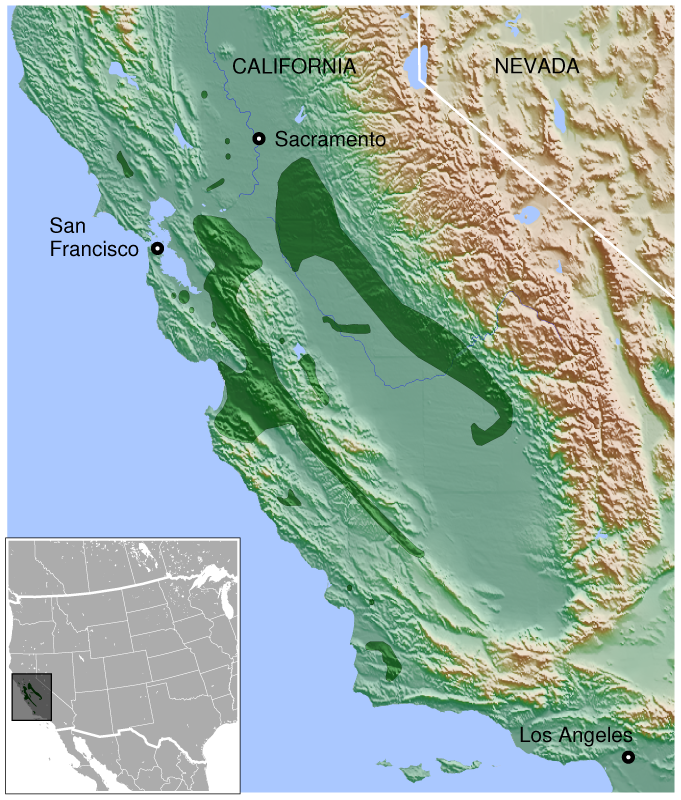
- California Tiger Salamander range

= California tiger salamander =

Species of amphibian

The California tiger salamander (Ambystoma californiense) is a vulnerable amphibian native to California. It is a mole salamander. Previously considered to be a subspecies of the tiger salamander (A. tigrinum), the California tiger salamander was recently designated a separate species again. Historically, they were endemic to the San Joaquin-Sacramento river valleys, although their range has now contracted into three distinct population segments that are geographically isolated and genetically distinct from one another. The California tiger salamander distinct population segment (DPS) in Sonoma County and the Santa Barbara County DPS are listed as federally endangered, while the Central California DPS is listed as federally threatened. The Sonoma County, south San Joaquin, and the Santa Barbara County DPS have diverged from the rest of the California tiger salamander populations for over one million years, since the Pleistocene and they may warrant status as separate species.

== Description ==
The California tiger salamander is a relatively large, secretive amphibian endemic to California. Adults can grow to a total length of about 7–8 inches. It has a stocky body and a broad, rounded snout. Adults are black with yellow or cream spots; larvae are greenish-grey in color. The California tiger salamander has brown protruding eyes with black irises.

== Habitat and range ==
The California tiger salamander depends on vernal pools and other seasonal ponds and stock ponds for reproduction; its habitat is limited to the vicinity of large, fishless vernal pools or similar water bodies. It occurs at elevations up to 1000 m (3200 ft). Adults migrate at night from upland habitats to aquatic breeding sites beginning with the first major rainfall of fall and winter, and return to upland habitats after breeding. This migration makes them vulnerable to negative impacts of human development, such as road mortalities.

Historically, the California tiger salamander probably occurred in grassland habitats throughout much of the state. It occurs from Sonoma County, especially in the Laguna de Santa Rosa (outside the floodplain), south to Santa Barbara County, in vernal pool complexes and isolated ponds along the Central Valley from Colusa County to Kern County, and in the coastal range. Both the Santa Barbara and Sonoma populations are listed as endangered since 2000 and 2003, respectively. On August 4, 2004, the US Fish and Wildlife Service listed the California tiger salamander as threatened within the Central DPS, effective September 3, 2004, reaffirming the prior endangered listings of the other distinct population segments and extending protection to all remaining populations.

The six populations are found in Sonoma County, the Bay Area (Stanislaus County, western Merced County, and most of San Benito County), the Central Valley, the southern San Joaquin Valley, the Central Coast Range, and Santa Barbara County.

The loss of California tiger salamander populations has been due primarily to human destruction of habitat and predators, such as American bullfrogs and access to breeding habitats. There is also a viable hybrid between the California tiger salamander and the introduced barred tiger salamander (Ambystoma tigrinum mavortium), which genetic evidence suggests have been hybridizing for 50–60 years. Hybridization between a threatened and an invasive species complicates the ability to offer protections for the California salamander.

== Life cycle ==
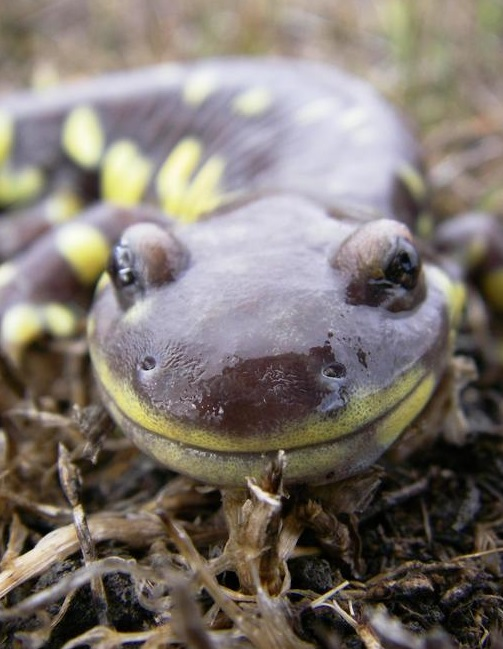
In San Benito County, California

Adults spend the majority of their lives underground, in burrows created by other animals, such as ground squirrels and gophers; these salamanders are poorly equipped for burrowing. Little is known about their underground life. This underground phase has often been referred to as estivation (the summertime equivalent of hibernation), but true estivation has never been observed, and fiber optic cameras in burrows have allowed researchers to witness salamanders actively foraging. Adults are known to eat earthworms, snails, insects, fish, and even small mammals but adult California tiger salamanders eat very little.

=== Reproduction and early life stages ===
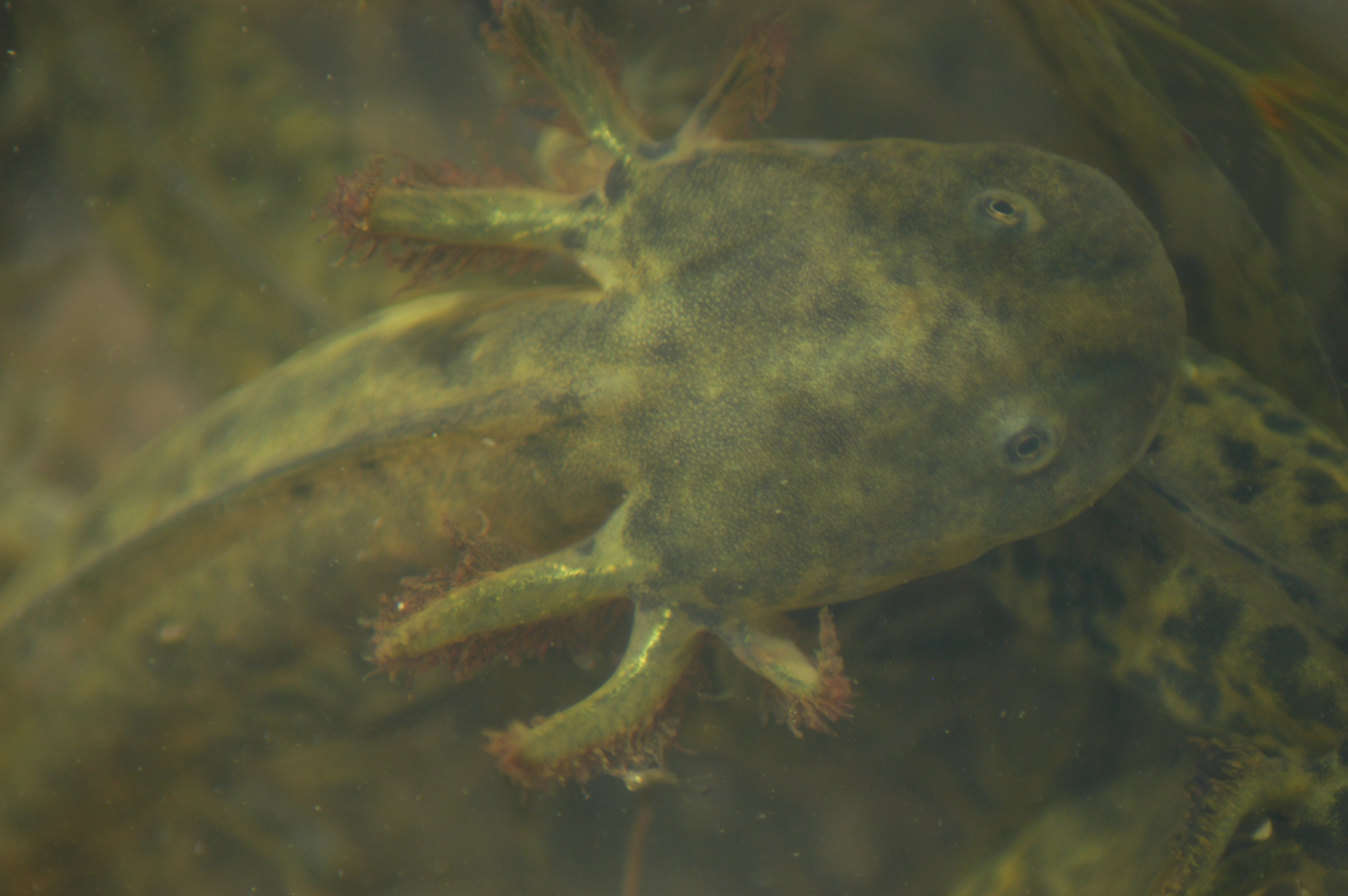
Larvae have gills

Breeding takes place after the first rains in late fall and early winter, when the wet season allows the salamanders to migrate to the nearest pond, a journey that may be as far as a 1.3 miles and take several days. The eggs, which the female lays in small clusters or singly, hatch after 10 to 14 days. The larval period lasts for three to six months. However, California tiger salamander larvae may also "overwinter". Transformation for overwintering larvae may take 13 months or more. Recent discoveries, such as overwintering, have management implications for this threatened species, particularly when aquatic habitats undergo modification. The larvae feed on other small invertebrates, including tadpoles. When their pond dries, they resorb their gills, develop lungs, and then the metamorphs leave the pond in search of a burrow. Their morphology is therefore adultlike soon after hatching, and the full transformation usually occurs within a few days, with one study observing the transformation in as few as four days. This is advantageous when utilizing ephemeral ponds for reproduction, since the salamanders must be ready to leave the pond before it dries up. This rapid metamorphosis may therefore be an evolutionary response to the unpredictable and varied climate and local site conditions.

In fact, the California tiger salamander's range often experiences periodic droughts that last several years. Juvenile recruitment may be minimal during these periods of drought, but the species may be maintained by occasional years with very high recruitment. These alternating periods are referred to as "boom and bust" cycles. Although some eggs may be laid in pools that dry up too early during periods of drought, environmental signals can also prevent California tiger salamanders from going to the pools to breed in the first place. These breeding migration indicators are an additional mechanism for the population boom and bust cycles. Amphibian breeding migrations occur when there is a high probability that the breeding pond contains enough water, so adequate precipitation is therefore an important factor.

Female California tiger salamanders may also be less sensitive to the environmental cues that initiate breeding migrations than males. Males have been observed to arrive at the breeding pools first and stay longer than females, which allows them more opportunities to mate with a greater number of females. Females, on the other hand, may increase their chances of reproductive success by waiting for a longer period of favorable environmental conditions before they migrate. This postponement likely minimizes the dangers of their terrestrial migration to the breeding pool and may also provide them with a greater number of males to choose from. However, some females may not migrate at all if environmental conditions are inadequate. Females invest more energy in offspring than males do, and have more to lose if the pond were to dry early and prevent juvenile metamorphosis. Yearly variation in the number of breeding females may therefore result from differences in precipitation.

"... the average female bred 1.4 times and produced 8.5 young that survived to metamorphosis per reproductive event, resulting in roughly 12 lifetime metamorphic offspring per female."

California tiger salamanders can live up to 15 years.

==== Perennial breeding pools, size extremes at metamorphosis, and conservation implications ====
Many of the theories that aim to explain the reproductive ecology and migration behavior of California tiger salamanders are based on the fact that they have been known to rely on vernal pools. However, it has been more recently discovered that California tiger salamanders can take advantage of perennial water bodies for breeding. More recent observations suggest that they breed in these other kinds of pools when they are encountered, such as stock ponds and fishless perennial creeks.

There have also been newly reported upper thresholds in the size of California tiger salamanders at the time that they metamorphose, and new research aims to establish a link between these size extremes and the use of perennial water bodies as part of the California tiger salamander's reproductive strategy. Amphibian larvae are able to metamorphose after reaching a certain minimum body size, but it has been argued that they often remain in the larval state beyond that threshold. This variability has been interpreted as a measure of phenotypic plasticity that favors either an early departure from a worsening larval environment or continuation in a favorable one. It has therefore also been suggested that environmental conditions, such as perennial water bodies, may drive or support facultative paedomorphosis. Recently reported upper thresholds in the size of California tiger salamanders at metamorphosis may consequently be linked to their also newly discovered ability to use perennial water bodies for breeding.

Size at metamorphosis and timing of metamorphosis can have significant impacts on individual fitness. Early timing and a large size at metamorphosis have been positively correlated with indicators of fitness such as first reproduction, survival, and adult size. The advantage of delaying metamorphosis is outweighed if the pond dries before metamorphosis is complete, but this is much less of a concern if breeding occurs in perennial pools. Breeding in perennial pools therefore has the potential to benefit individual fitness of California tiger salamanders through a larger size at metamorphosis.

Individual fitness is particularly relevant because of the importance of terrestrial survival to California tiger salamander populations. Demographic studies of California tiger salamanders show that breeding seasons with high reproductive success are relatively rare. In fact, annual reproductive success of ambystomatid salamanders seems to be universally low, at less than 30 metamorphs produced per reproductive female. Regulation of ambystomatid salamander populations may therefore be more dependent on terrestrial survival than previously thought, and high survivorship of adult individuals is consequently vital for long-term viability of California tiger salamander populations. Metamorphosis at a larger size could potentially help promote higher terrestrial survival through increased individual fitness.

More generally, anthropogenic perennial ponds could also provide essential breeding habitat if precipitation rates decline long term in the California tiger salamander range. The opportunistic use of available aquatic breeding habitat could even facilitate the colonization of new sites. In areas with few or no vernal pools due to declining precipitation, drought, or large-scale land use change, the opportunistic use of perennial water bodies could allow for the persistence of the California tiger salamander.

== See also ==
- Vernal pools or ponds
