= Oakwood School, Morgan Hill =

Oakwood School
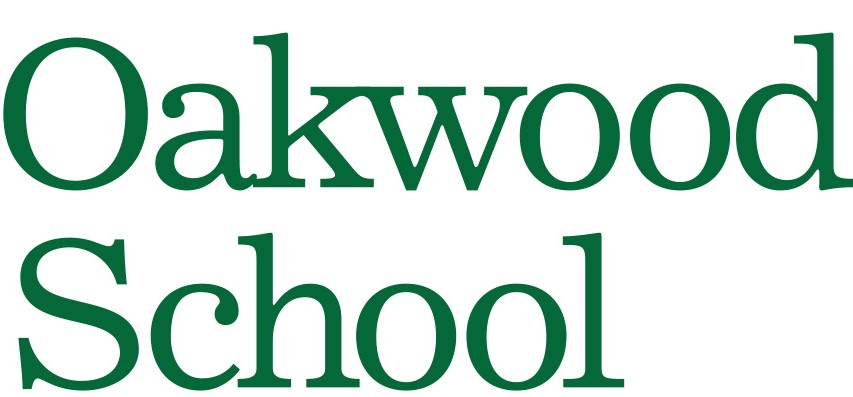

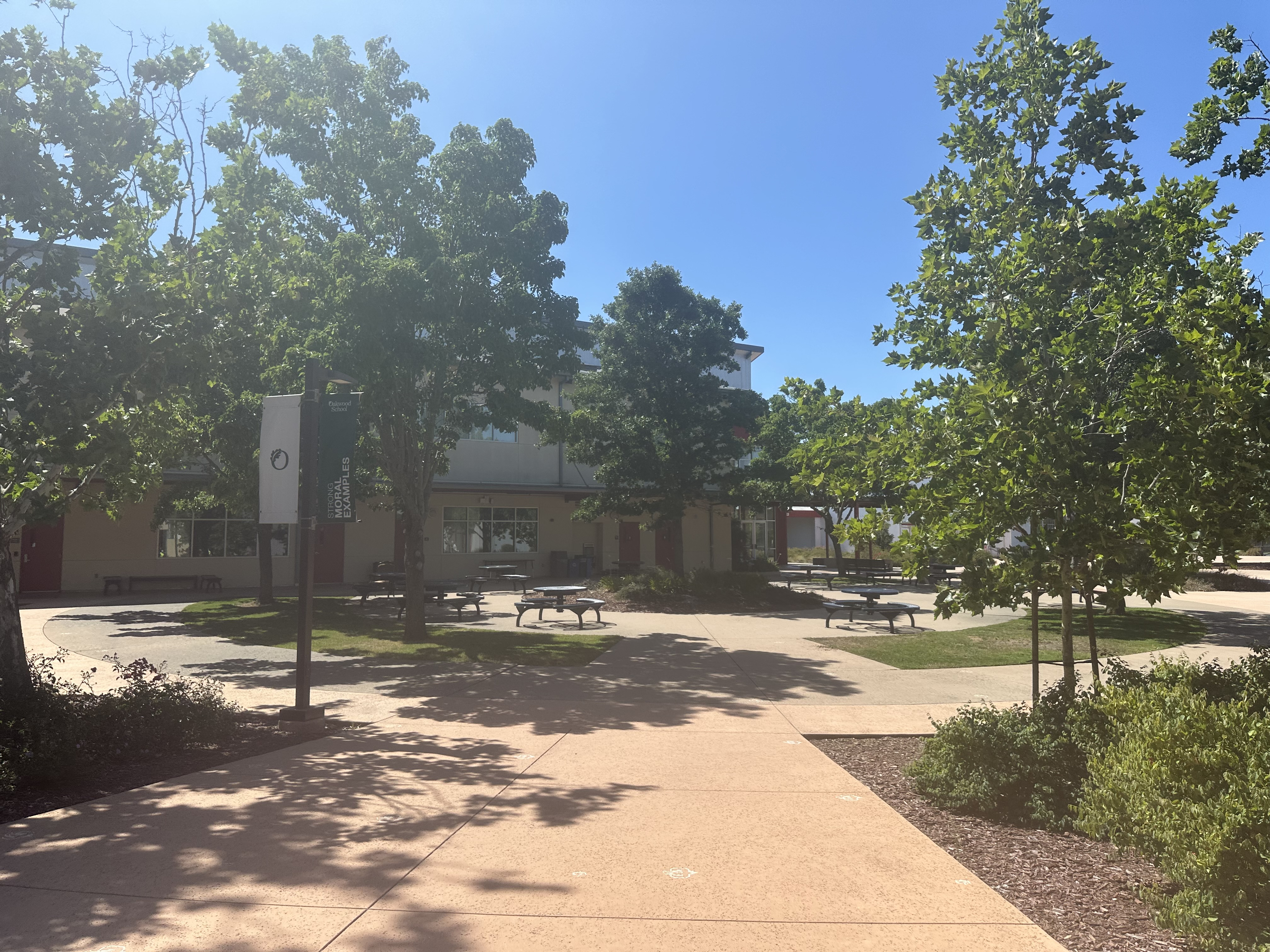
- Part of the campus in 2025

Location
- 105 John Wilson Way; Morgan Hill, California 95037; USA; 37°06′14″N 121°38′02″W

Information
- Type: Private, Non-Sectarian
- Established: 2001
- Sister school: Pinewood School, Los Altos
- Head of school: Michelle Riches Helvey
- Grades: Preschool-12
- Enrollment: 102
- Campus size: 18 acres
- Colors: Green and Silver
- Athletics conference: CIF Central Coast Section: Pacific Coast Athletic League
- Mascot: Oakwood Hawks, Thunder The Hawk
- Website: www.oakwoodway.org

Oakwood School is a private, non-sectarian college preparatory school in the south Silicon Valley community of Morgan Hill, in Santa Clara County, California.

== History ==
Oakwood was founded in 1998 as the Morgan Hill Country School. Michelle Riches Helvey and her husband Ted Helvey purchased the school and reestablished the school as Oakwood School. In 2005, the high school grades began and in 2009, Oakwood graduated its first senior class.

Oakwood's Space Systems Engineering class has received notable recognition, with students appearing in an interview on KTVU FOX 2. The program has been accepted by NASA to deploy a 2U CubeSat to Low Earth Orbit.

Oakwood is the sister school of Pinewood School, Los Altos, which was founded by Gwen Riches (grandmother of Michelle Riches Helvey), in 1959.

== Academics ==
Oakwood's high school is one of the best ranked college-prep schools in the San Francisco Bay Area (ranked 5th in 2016 in Silicon Valley by Niche).

Oakwood School is accredited by the Western Association of Schools and Colleges and is a member of the National Association of Independent Schools.

=== International studies ===
Oakwood is a member of the Cambridge Network, an international academic organization, which allows Oakwood to utilize the Cambridge Network's international studies program, allowing Oakwood students to travel to other network schools around the world and similarly allowing Oakwood to host international exchange students from within the network.

=== Athletics ===
Oakwood offers Varsity and JV sports including Basketball, Volleyball, Soccer, Cross Country, Track and Field, Tennis, Wrestling, Golf, and Swimming, and participates in the Mission Trail Athletic League (MTAL). More than 70% of students are members of at least one sports team beginning in their freshman year. Oakwood plays competitively in several sports, and advances to the Central Coast Section (CCS) playoffs regularly. The Varsity Boys Basketball program won the school’s first CCS team championship in 2023 and advanced to the Elite Eight in the State of California.

=== Advanced Placement ===
Oakwood offers a large number of AP classes. The overwhelming majority of students take one or more AP classes a year (with the exception of freshmen). Such classes include AP Art (2D and 3D), AP Spanish, AP French, AP Environmental Science, AP Physics, AP Chemistry, AP Government, AP European History, AP US History, and AP Computer Science. These classes often qualify students for college credits at the college level.

=== College admissions ===
Oakwood is a college preparatory school, and as such, all graduates go on to college. Graduates attend colleges all over the nation, with a few choosing international universities. Stanford University, University of Pennsylvania, Columbia University, Georgetown University, Cornell University, Vanderbilt University, Santa Clara University, UCLA, University of California, Berkeley, University of Southern California, Pitzer, Harvey Mudd, Brigham Young University, Boston University, Colby College, Baylor University, Chapman University, McGill University and many others are among the many colleges and universities where Oakwood students are enrolled or have attended.

== Notable alumni ==
- Romina Gupta, Team USA gold medal gymnastics champion
