= Romina Gupta =

American acrobatic gymnast

Gymnastics career
- Country represented: United States; (Team USA (2013-2016))

Romina Gupta
Medal record

Women's gymnastics

Representing the United States
Gold medal – first place	2015 World Championships	
Silver medal – second place	2014 World Championships	
Silver medal – second place	2013 World Championships	

Romina Gupta is an American acrobatic gymnast and a former member of the USA National Gymnastics Team.

== Career ==
As a gymnast, Gupta won a gold medal at the 2015 World Artistic Gymnastics Championships, as well as silver medals in 2014 and 2013.

== Personal life ==
Gupta is from Morgan Hill, California. She attended the Oakwood School, Morgan Hill and graduated from Mount Holyoke College.

Gupta is Indian-American, of Bengali origin.
