= Morgan Hill, California =

City in California, United States

- City
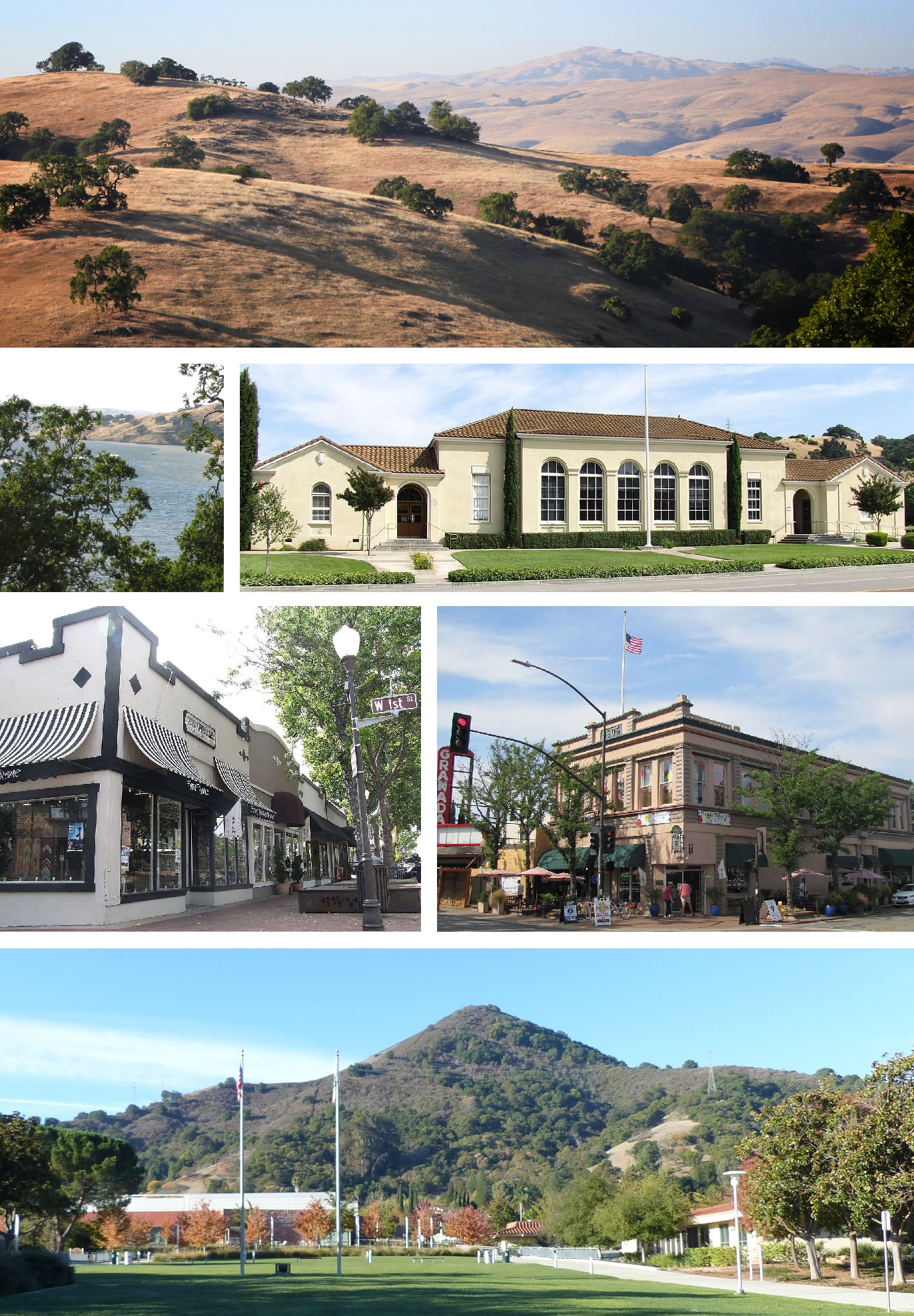
- Clockwise: the Diablo Range hills, historic Morgan Hill Elementary Building, Votaw Building, Civic Center and El Toro, Downtown shops, Anderson Lake
- Interactive map of Morgan Hill, California
- Location in the United States
- Coordinates: 37°07′50″N 121°37′26″W
- Country: United States
- State: California
- County: Santa Clara
- Incorporated: November 10, 1906
- Named for: Diana and Hiram Morgan Hill

Government
  - Type: Council–manager government
  - Mayor: Mark Turner
  - City manager: Christina Turner

Area
  - Total: 12.94 sq mi (33.51 km^{2})
  - Land: 12.94 sq mi (33.51 km^{2})
  - Water: 0 sq mi (0.00 km^{2})
- Elevation: 361 ft (110 m)

Population (2020)
  - Total: 45,483
  - Density: 3,515/sq mi (1,357/km^{2})
- Time zone: UTC-8 (Pacific)
  - Summer (DST): UTC-7 (PDT)
- ZIP Codes: 95037–95038
- Area codes: 408/669
- FIPS code: 06-49278
- GNIS feature ID: 2411162
- Website: www.morganhill.ca.gov

Morgan Hill is a city in Santa Clara County, California, United States, situated at the southern tip of Silicon Valley in the San Francisco Bay Area. As of the 2020 census, Morgan Hill had a population of 45,483. Morgan Hill is an affluent residential community, the seat of several high-tech companies, and a dining and recreational destination, owing to its luxury hospitality, wineries, and nature parks.

== History ==
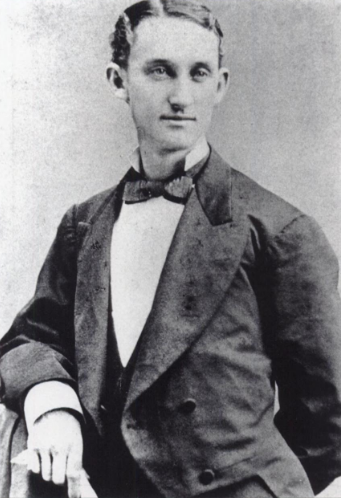
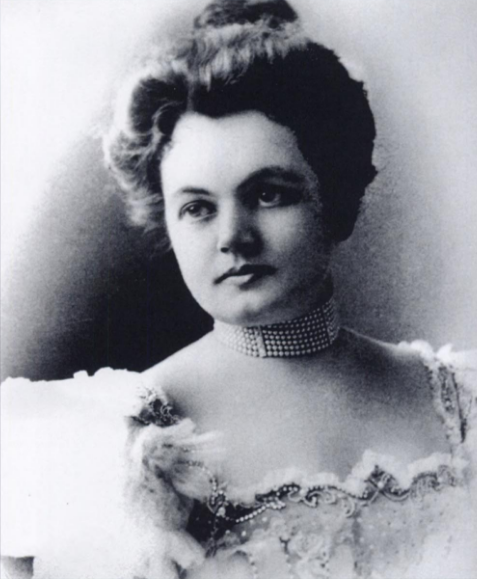
City founders Hiram Morgan Hill and Diana Helen Murphy (c. 1880s)

Prior to the arrival of Spanish colonists, Santa Clara Valley had been inhabited by the Tamien nation of Ohlone people for more than 6,000 years. In that area, the Matalan tribe lived in a hunter-gatherer society.

Before the area was colonized as part of the Alta California province of the Viceroyalty of New Spain, the 1772 Spanish expedition led by Pedro Fages and Father Juan Crespí, the two explorers camped in the area around Morgan Hill alongside Llagas Creek. The location of their camp subsequently became a campsite for Spanish soldiers on their way from New Spain to Alta California. With the founding of Mission Santa Clara de Asís in 1777, the lands of present-day Morgan Hill were granted to the Roman Catholic Church.

Following Mexico's independence from Spain, land was redistributed to Mexican citizens across California and the land encompassing modern-day Morgan Hill was granted to Juan María Hernández, in 1835. In 1845, Martin Murphy Sr., an Irish-born Mexican citizen, acquired the area and named it Rancho Ojo del Agua de la Coche.

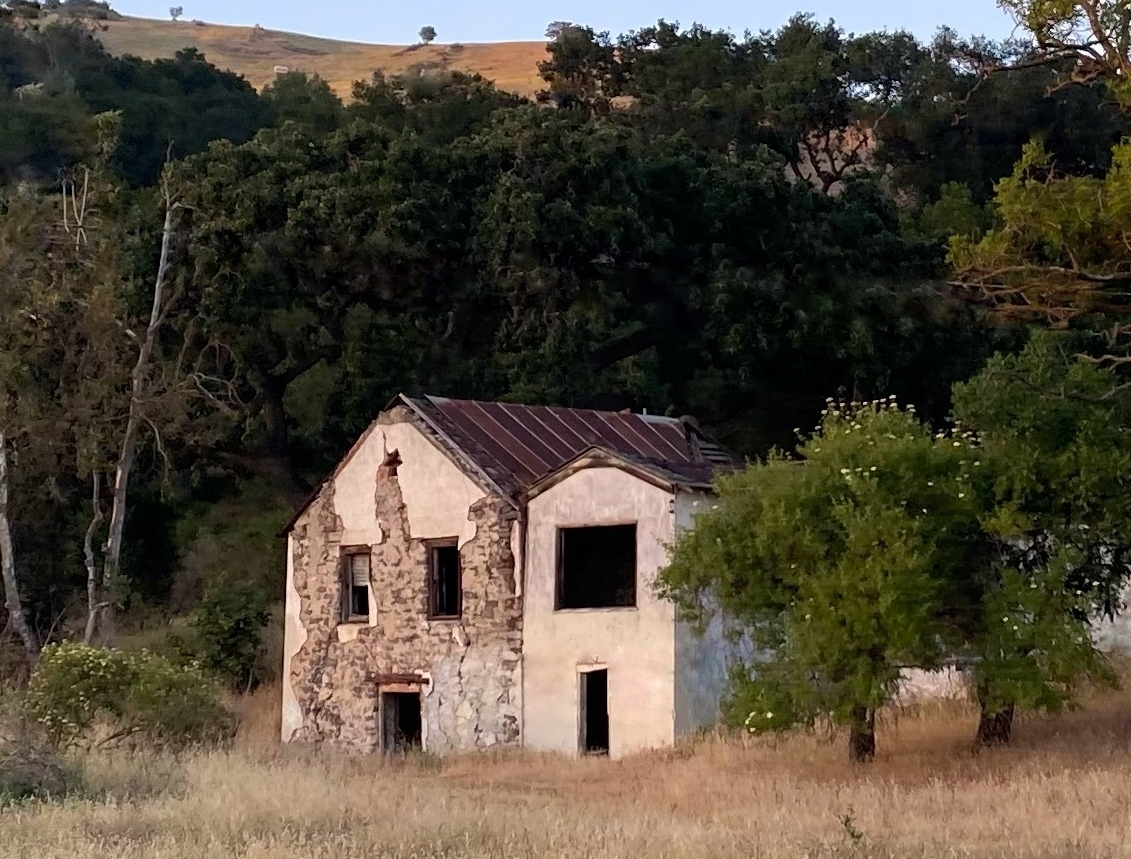
The Malaguerra Winery in the Madrone neighborhood, built in 1869 by Californio rancher José María Malaguerra, is on the National Historic Register.

In 1850, Martin Murphy Sr.'s youngest son, Daniel Martin Murphy, married Maria Fisher, heiress of the neighboring 19,000-acre (7,700 ha) Rancho Refugio de la Laguna Seca, thus combining the two estates. By 1870, the Murphy family had acquired around 70,000 acres (28,000 ha) of the Morgan Hill area.

Martin Murphy Sr.'s middle son, Bernard Murphy died in 1853, leaving the majority of his estate to Martin Murphy Sr., but a substantial portion of the land in the Morgan Hill area to his surviving wife, Catherine O'Toole, who later married James Dunne.

By the late 1850s, Californio ranchero José María Malaguerra began cultivating vineyards in Madrone, then an independent township just north of Morgan Hill. In 1869, he founded the Malaguerra Winery, the oldest extant winery in Santa Clara Valley, which is listed on the National Register of Historic Places. In 1875, Tiburcio Vásquez, famed Californio bandido, robbed 21-Mile House; the Vásquez Oak that stands there today is named in his memory.

In 1882, Daniel and Maria Murphy's daughter, Diana Helen Murphy, fell in love with Missouri businessman Hiram Morgan Hill. They married in secret, there are discrepancies on why this happened with some sources stating her father disapproved of the union and didn't think Hiram could be a rancher, and others stating it was due to the religious differences with his family being Quaker and her family being Roman Catholic. When Daniel Martin Murphy died, Diana and Hiram Morgan Hill inherited the 4,500 acres (1,800 ha) surrounding the original Murphy estate, near Murphy's Peak (now known as El Toro). In 1884, the Hills built their weekend estate, as the family primarily lived in San Francisco, dubbed Villa Mira Monte (Spanish for Mountain-View Estate).

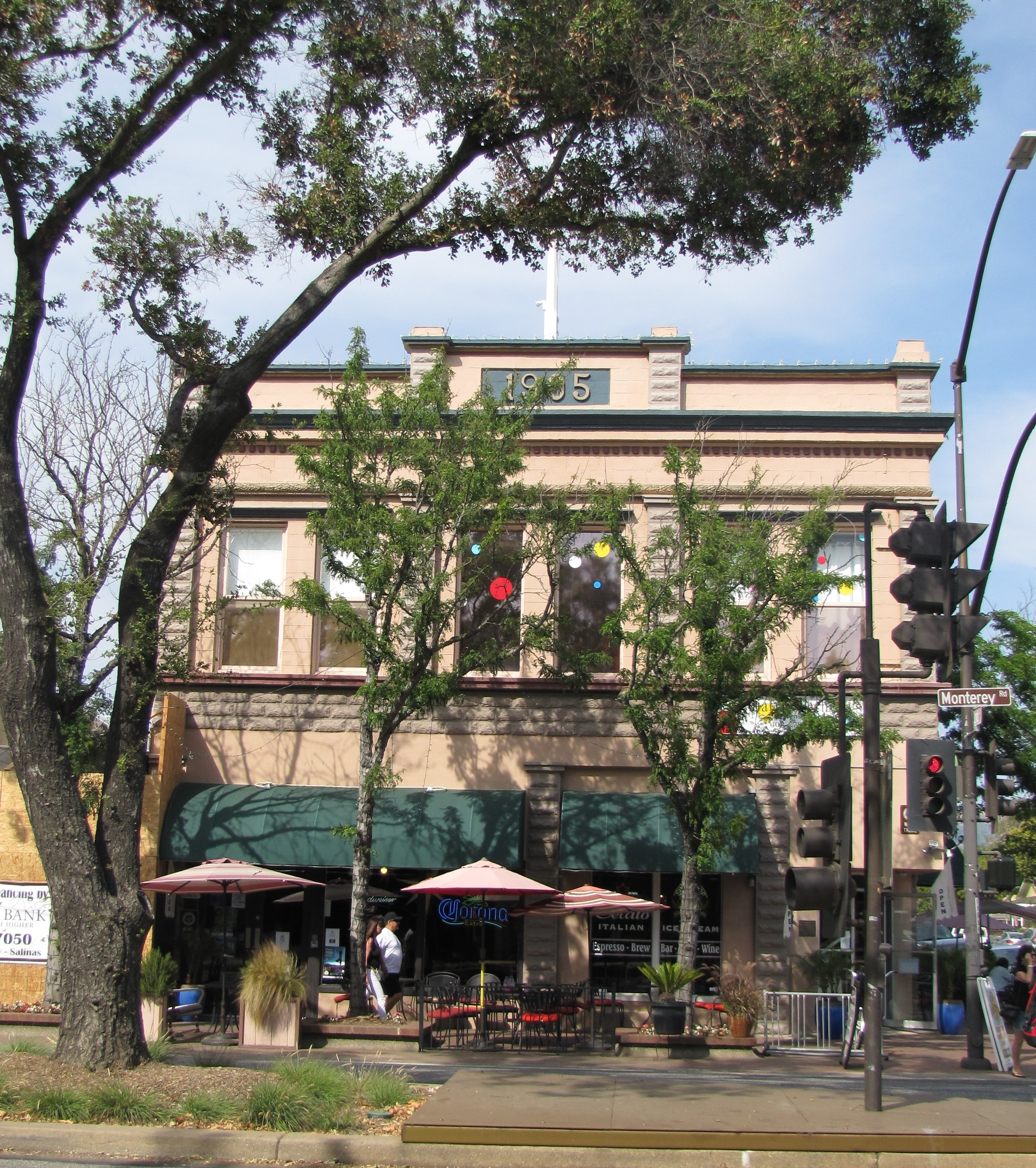
Downtown's historic Votaw Building was built in 1905.

By 1886, the family chose to live primarily at the Rancho Ojo del Agua de la Coche, as they jointly inherited 22,000 acres (8,900 ha) around the estate. However, the move was temporary, as scandal caused by the marital complications of Hiram Morgan Hill's prominent socialite sister, Sarah Althea Hill, and her husband, Senator William Sharon, made the Hills a source of social ridicule, thus causing them to start spending the majority of their time between San Francisco and Washington, D.C., thus leaving their rancho untouched for long periods of time.

In 1892, Hiram Morgan Hill contracted land developer C. H. Phillips to divide and liquidate the Rancho Ojo del Agua de la Coche, only retaining the Villa Mira Monte estate and the surrounding 200 acres (81 ha), which the Hill family would hold until 1916. By 1898, a significant community had built around what was then known as Morgan Hill's Ranch, and a Southern Pacific Railroad station was built in the Huntington area. Rather than ask to stop at Huntington station, passengers would ask to stop at "Morgan Hill's Ranch", which eventually shortened to "Morgan Hill".

On November 10, 1906, the planned community, a result of the divisions of C. H. Phillips, was incorporated as the Town of Morgan Hill. Hiram Morgan and Diana Hill's only child, Diana Murphy Hill, married the French nobleman, Baron Hadouin de Reinach-Werth, and thus Baron Hadouin started to help manage Hiram Morgan Hill's properties between California and Nevada. However, the baron was called back to France to serve in the military and never returned. In 1913, Hiram Morgan Hill died at his Elko estate in Nevada, thus leaving his properties to his daughter. Diana Murphy Hill later remarried, in 1916, to Sir George Rhodes, thus causing the Murphy heiress of the Morgan Hill estate to relocate to the United Kingdom, taking her and Hiram Morgan Hill's daughter, Diana Murphy Hill, thus finally selling off the Villa Mira Monte and ending the Hill family presence in the community named after them.

In 1959, Morgan Hill annexed Madrone, turning the former township into a Morgan Hill's northernmost district, bordering San Jose and Coyote Valley.

== Geography ==
Morgan Hill is approximately 24 mi (39 km) south of downtown San Jose, 13 mi (21 km) north of Gilroy, and 15 mi (24 km) inland from the Pacific coast. Lying in a roughly 4-mile-wide (6 km) southern extension of the Santa Clara Valley, it is bounded by the Santa Cruz Mountains to the west and the Diablo Range to the east. At the valley floor, Morgan Hill lies at an elevation of about 350 feet (107 m) above MSL.

According to the U.S. Census Bureau, the city encompasses an area of 12.9 square miles (33 km^{2}), all land. Although there are no natural lakes or ponds within the city limits, there are several flood-control and water storage reservoirs in the adjacent hills which are operated by the Santa Clara Valley Water District, with recreational activities such as boating, etc., administered by the Santa Clara County Department of Parks and Recreation.

Morgan Hill is located within the seismically active San Francisco Bay region. The significant earthquakes in the region are generally associated with crustal movements along well-defined, active fault zones. The nearest known active faults are the San Andreas Fault, approximately 12 mi (19 km) southwest, and the Calaveras Fault, approximately 0.99 mi (1.6 km) northeast. Both faults have produced major earthquakes in the past, and have estimated maximum credible Richter magnitudes of 8.3 and 7.3, respectively. The 1984 Morgan Hill earthquake registered at a 6.2 magnitude.

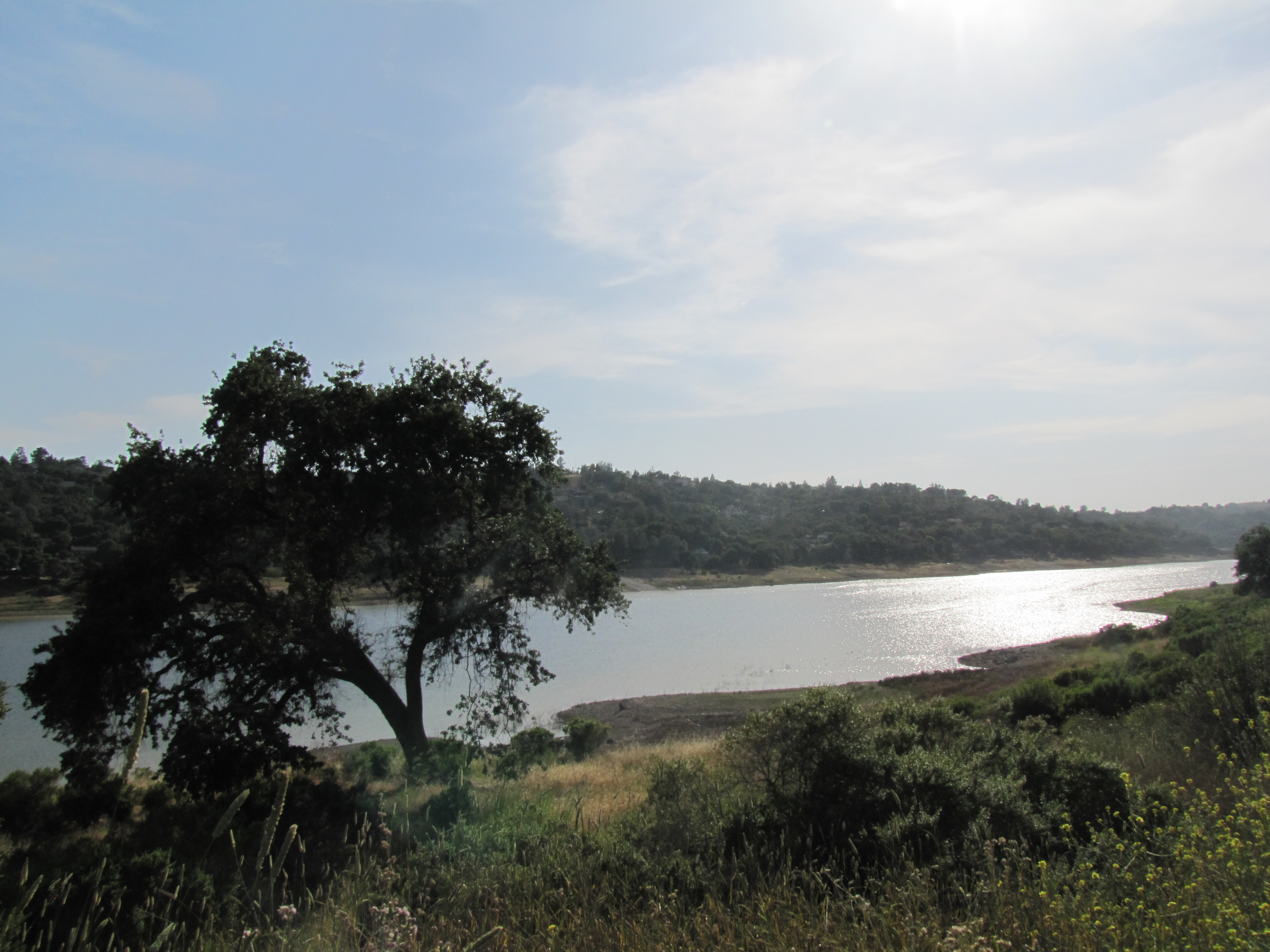
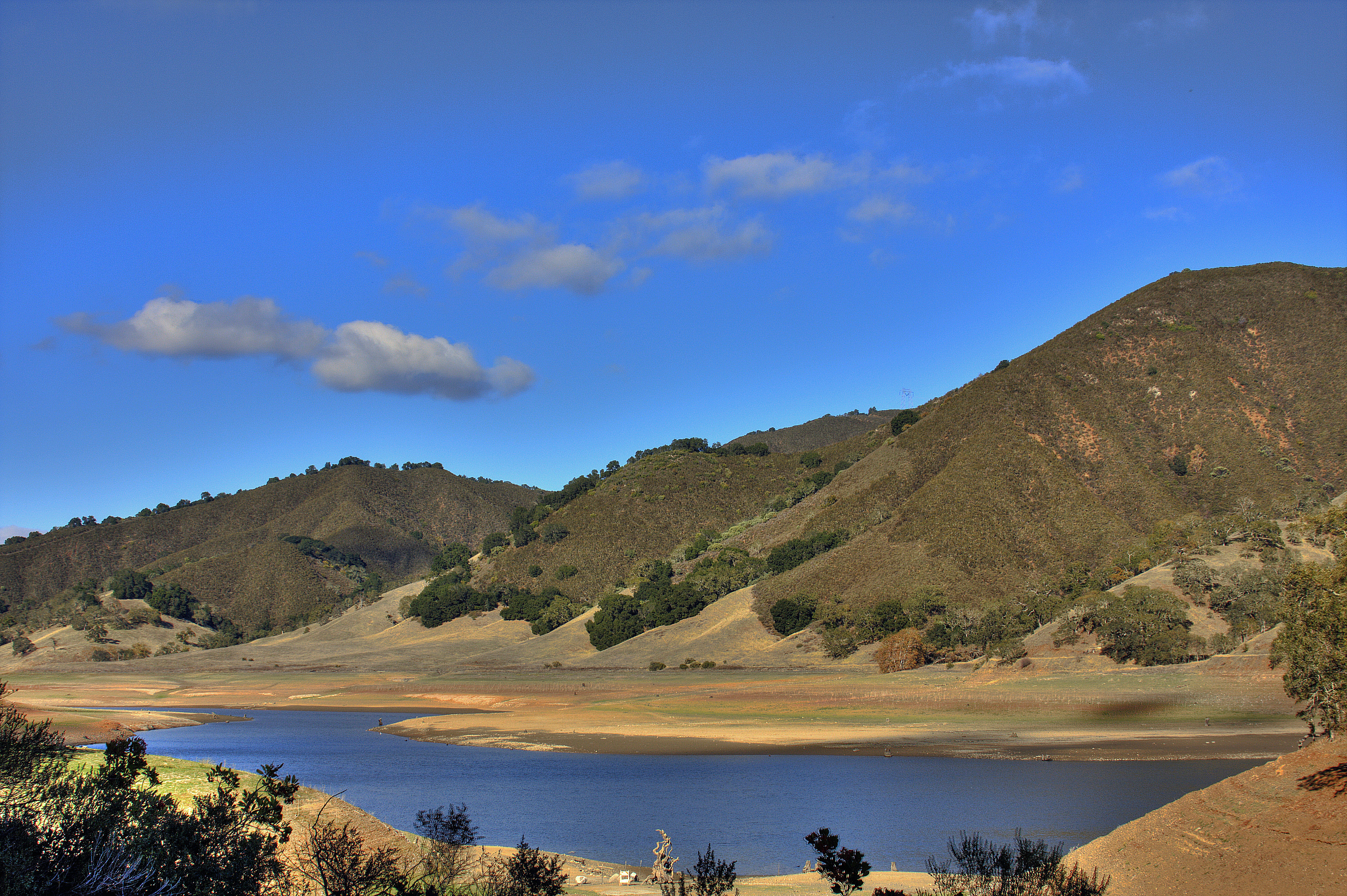
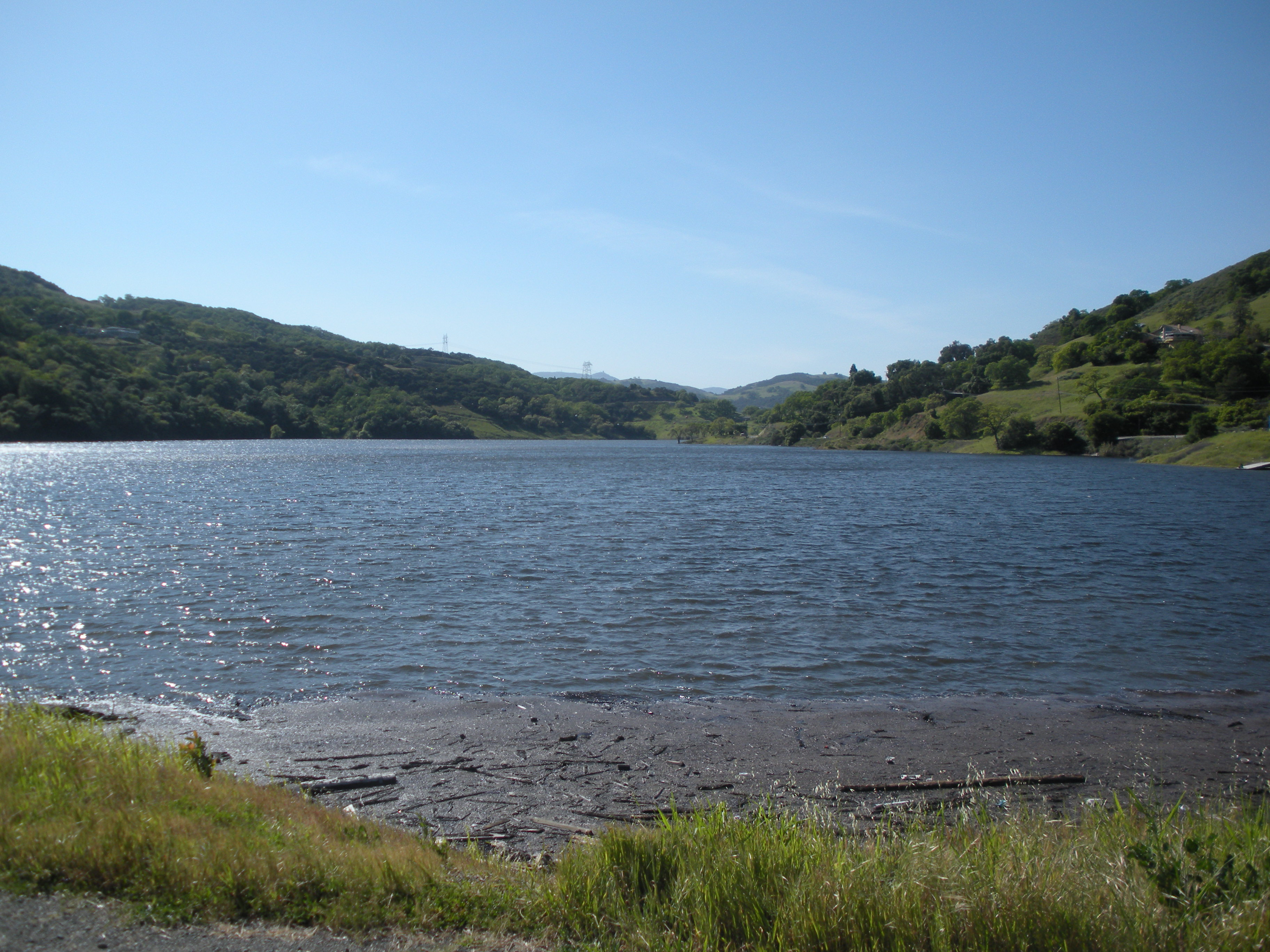
Morgan Hill is home to numerous lakes, including Anderson Lake (left), Uvas Reservoir (center), and Chesbro Reservoir (right).

Within Morgan Hill's area are a number of lakes and reservoirs, including Anderson Lake (eastern Morgan Hill), Uvas Reservoir (west), Chesbro Reservoir (west), and Coyote Lake (south).

The Sargent-Berrocal Fault, a potentially active fault, lies 9.9 mi (16 km) away from the sites and has an estimated maximum credible Richter magnitude of 7.4. The Coyote Creek Fault is located in Morgan Hill and is classified as potentially active as well. In addition, several unnamed faults traverse the western slopes of the upland areas. Geomorphic evidence suggests that these faults were active during recent geologic time. However, these fault-related geomorphic features are not as fresh as those of the active Calaveras Fault and are considered to be somewhat older.

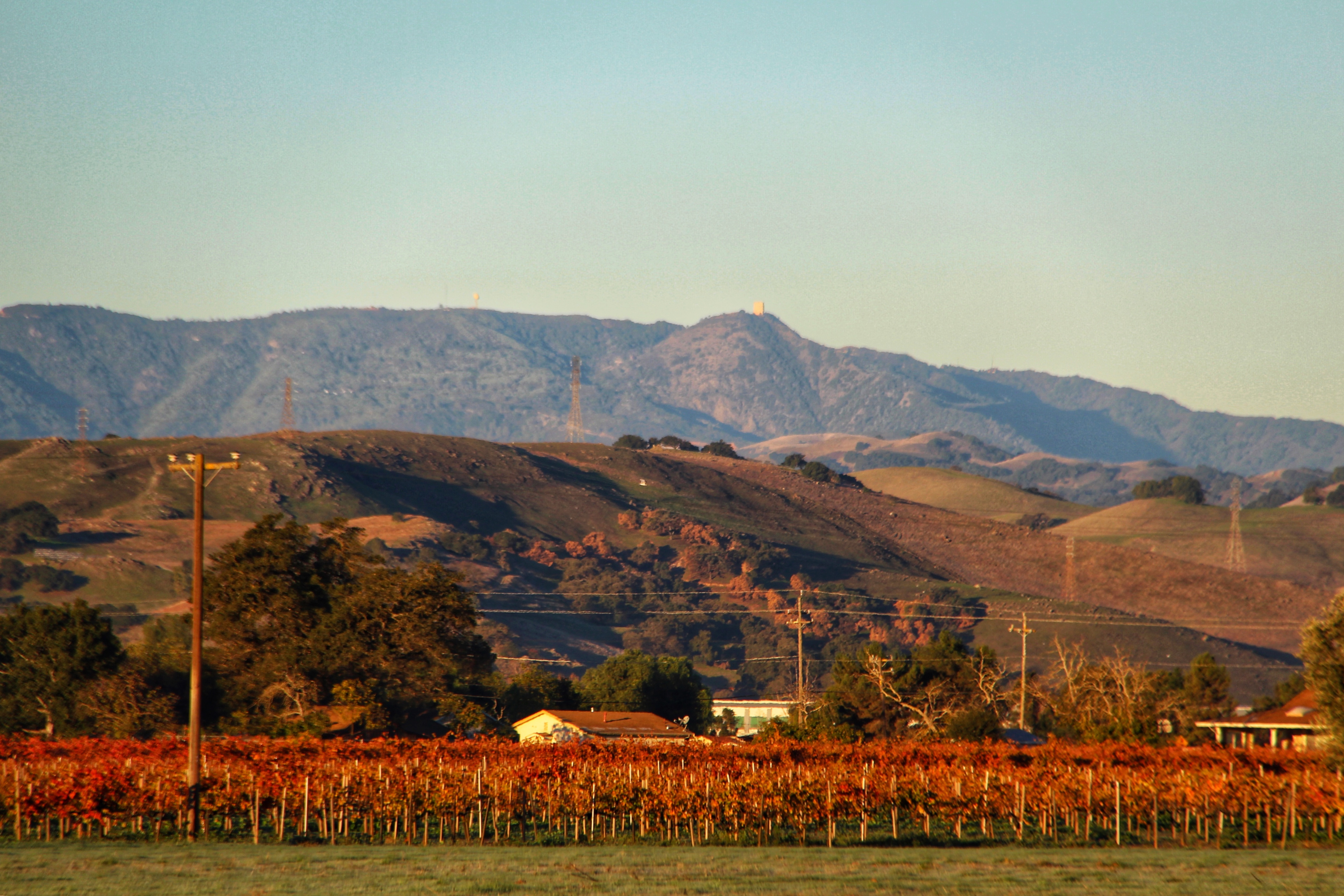
Given its Mediterranean climate, Morgan Hill is well known for its vineyards and wine-growing, as a part of the Santa Clara Valley designated AVA.

Morgan Hill is one of very few sources for a type of semi-precious gemstone marketed under the name "Morgan Hill poppy jasper". According to geologists, this local variety of orbicular jasper formed through a combination of volcanic and seismic activity on the slopes of El Toro. Known extant deposits of the mineral are located on private lands, not accessible to the public. A local business, El Toro Brewing Company, has a collection of poppy jasper on display at their rural Morgan Hill brewery and on a large bar top inlaid with the stone at their brewpub in downtown Morgan Hill. Examples are also on display at the Morgan Hill Museum and at the Morgan Hill Community and Cultural Center. The local Poppy Jasper Film Festival is also named after the mineral.

The highlight of local geography is El Toro. According to a local legend of the early 1900s, author Bret Harte named the hill when he climbed it and discovered two bulls fighting near the summit (they subsequently chased him back down). The official name shown on the U.S. Geological Survey's maps is simply "El Toro", but it has been deemed "Murphy's Peak" by locals. Visitors, not aware of the origin of the town's name, often mistakenly assume that El Toro is "Morgan" Hill. It is USGS Feature ID# 223063 in the Geographic Names Information System (GNIS), maintained by the United States Board on Geographic Names. Elevation at the summit is about 1,427 ft (435 m). The hill, overshadowing the town to the west, has been incorporated into the city's seal and official logo.

=== Neighborhoods ===
Morgan Hill is divided into numerous neighborhoods, which can in turn be divided into smaller communities or areas. Morgan Hill's principal neighborhoods are:

- Downtown (Morgan Hill's central entertainment and business district)
- Madrone (former township which constitutes Morgan Hill's northwestern district)
- Paradise Valley and Chesbro Lake
- Llagas Valley
- San Martin/South Morgan Hill (including unincorporated San Martin)
- Coyote Valley/North Morgan Hill (including unincorporated Coyote Valley)
- Anderson Lake (including residents of Henry W. Coe State Park)

=== Climate ===
Due to the moderating influence of the Pacific Ocean, Morgan Hill experiences a mild, Mediterranean climate. Temperatures range from an average midsummer maximum of 90.2 °F (32.3 °C) to an average midwinter low of 33.6 °F (0.9 °C). The average annual precipitation is 18.9 inches (480 mm), and the summer months are typically dry. Snowfall is rare within Morgan Hill; there have only been two reported cases of snow. Summer months contain coastal fogs, while winter months have many sunny and partly cloudy days, with frequent breaks between rainstorms. The local terrain is inconducive to tornadoes, severe windstorms and thunderstorms. The local climate supports chaparral and grassland biomes, with stands of live oak at higher elevations.

Climate data for Morgan Hill (1948 to 2016)
Month	Jan	Feb	Mar	Apr	May	Jun	Jul	Aug	Sep	Oct	Nov	Dec	Year
Mean maximum °F (°C)	61.3 (16.3)	62.1 (16.7)	62.8 (17.1)	69.3 (20.7)	75.4 (24.1)	80.5 (26.9)	86.4 (30.2)	86.9 (30.5)	85.2 (29.6)	77.1 (25.1)	63.6 (17.6)	61.1 (16.2)	72.6 (22.6)
Average precipitation inches (mm)	4.83 (123)	4.72 (120)	3.21 (82)	1.50 (38)	0.29 (7.4)	0 (0)	0.03 (0.76)	0 (0)	0.04 (1.0)	0.95 (24)	2.39 (61)	3.70 (94)	21.68 (551)
Source: WRCC

== Demographics ==
Historical population
Census	Pop.	Note	%±
1910	607		—
1920	646		6.4%
1930	908		40.6%
1940	1,014		11.7%
1950	1,627		60.5%
1960	3,151		93.7%
1970	5,579		77.1%
1980	17,060		205.8%
1990	23,928		40.3%
2000	33,556		40.2%
2010	37,882		12.9%
2020	45,483		20.1%
U.S. Decennial Census

=== 2020 census ===
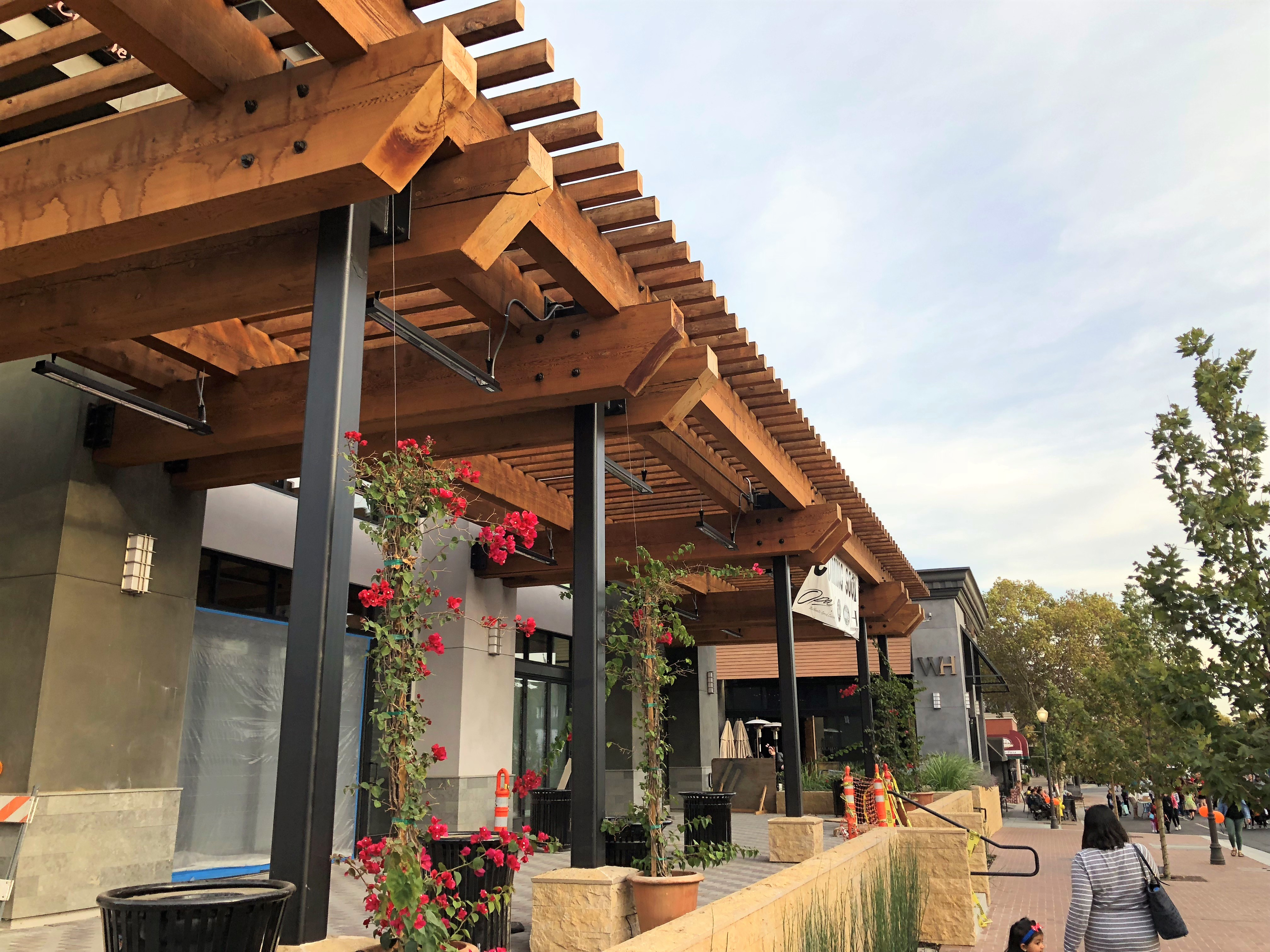
Restaurants in the downtown

As of the 2020 census, Morgan Hill had a population of 45,483 and a population density of 3,515.5 inhabitants per square mile (1,357.3/km^{2}). The median age was 39.9 years. 24.2% of residents were under the age of 18, 8.1% were aged 18 to 24, 24.5% were aged 25 to 44, 28.1% were aged 45 to 64, and 15.0% were 65 years of age or older. For every 100 females there were 95.4 males, and for every 100 females age 18 and over there were 93.4 males age 18 and over.

The Census reported that 98.7% of the population lived in households, 0.9% lived in non-institutionalized group quarters, and 0.5% were institutionalized. In addition, 99.9% of residents lived in urban areas, while 0.1% lived in rural areas.

There were 15,140 households in Morgan Hill, of which 39.8% had children under the age of 18 living in them. Of all households, 60.7% were married-couple households, 5.5% were cohabiting couple households, 12.4% were households with a male householder and no spouse or partner present, and 21.4% were households with a female householder and no spouse or partner present. About 16.9% of all households were made up of individuals and 8.3% had someone living alone who was 65 years of age or older. The average household size was 2.96, and there were 11,790 families (77.9% of all households).

There were 15,567 housing units at an average density of 1,203.2 units per square mile (464.6 units/km^{2}), of which 15,140 (97.3%) were occupied. Of the occupied units, 71.8% were owner-occupied and 28.2% were occupied by renters. The vacancy rate was 2.7%, including a homeowner vacancy rate of 0.6% and a rental vacancy rate of 3.7%.

Racial composition as of the 2020 census
Race	Number	Percent
White	22,588	49.7%
Black or African American	994	2.2%
American Indian and Alaska Native	653	1.4%
Asian	6,728	14.8%
Native Hawaiian and Other Pacific Islander	188	0.4%
Some other race	7,292	16.0%
Two or more races	7,040	15.5%
Hispanic or Latino (of any race)	15,044	33.1%

=== 2023 ACS estimates ===
In 2023, the US Census Bureau estimated that the median household income was $159,758, and the per capita income was $65,671. About 2.0% of families and 3.9% of the population were below the poverty line.

=== 2010 census ===
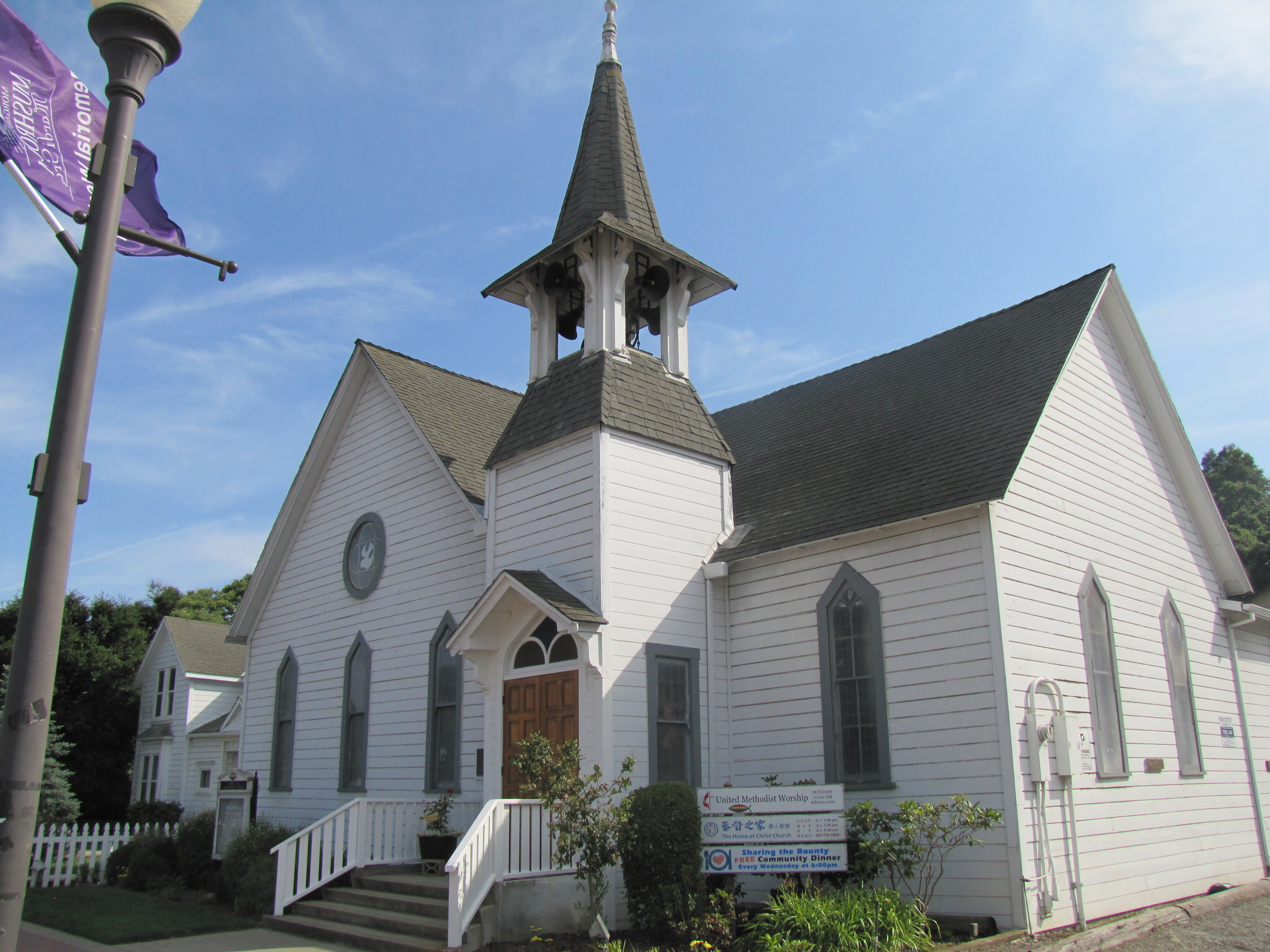
The historic United Methodist Church on Monterey Street

The 2010 U.S. census reported that Morgan Hill had a population of 37,882. The population density was 2,940.8 inhabitants per square mile (1,135.4/km^{2}). The ethnic makeup of Morgan Hill was 24,713 (65.2%) White, 746 (2.0%) African American, 335 (0.9%) Native American, 3,852 (10.2%) Asian, 125 (0.3%) Pacific Islander, 5,779 (15.3%) from other races, and 2,332 (6.2%) from two or more races. Hispanic or Latino of any race were 12,863 persons (34.0%).

The Census reported that 37,496 people (99.0% of the population) lived in households, 164 (0.4%) lived in non-institutionalized group quarters, and 222 (0.6%) were institutionalized.

There were 12,326 households, out of which 5,538 (44.9%) had children under the age of 18 living in them, 7,581 (61.5%) were opposite-sex married couples living together, 1,469 (11.9%) had a female householder with no husband present, 646 (5.2%) had a male householder with no wife present. There were 660 (5.4%) unmarried opposite-sex partnerships, and 89 (0.7%) same-sex married couples or partnerships. 1,998 households (16.2%) were made up of individuals, and 757 (6.1%) had someone living alone who was 65 years of age or older. The average household size was 3.04. There were 9,696 families (78.7% of all households); the average family size was 3.39.

The population was spread out, with 10,838 people (28.6%) under the age of 18, 2,909 people (7.7%) aged 18 to 24, 10,000 people (26.4%) aged 25 to 44, 10,537 people (27.8%) aged 45 to 64, and 3,598 people (9.5%) who were 65 years of age or older. The median age was 36.8 years. For every 100 females, there were 97.9 males. For every 100 females age 18 and over, there were 94.5 males.

There were 12,859 housing units at an average density of 998.2 per square mile (385.4/km^{2}), of which 8,793 (71.3%) were owner-occupied, and 3,533 (28.7%) were occupied by renters. The homeowner vacancy rate was 1.7%; the rental vacancy rate was 2.6%. 26,148 people (69.0% of the population) lived in owner-occupied housing units and 11,348 people (30.0%) lived in rental housing units.

Substantial expansion of the population of Morgan Hill occurred from the late 1980s onward. This population expansion was enabled by the removal of a growth constraint in the form of sewage treatment capacity.

== Economy ==
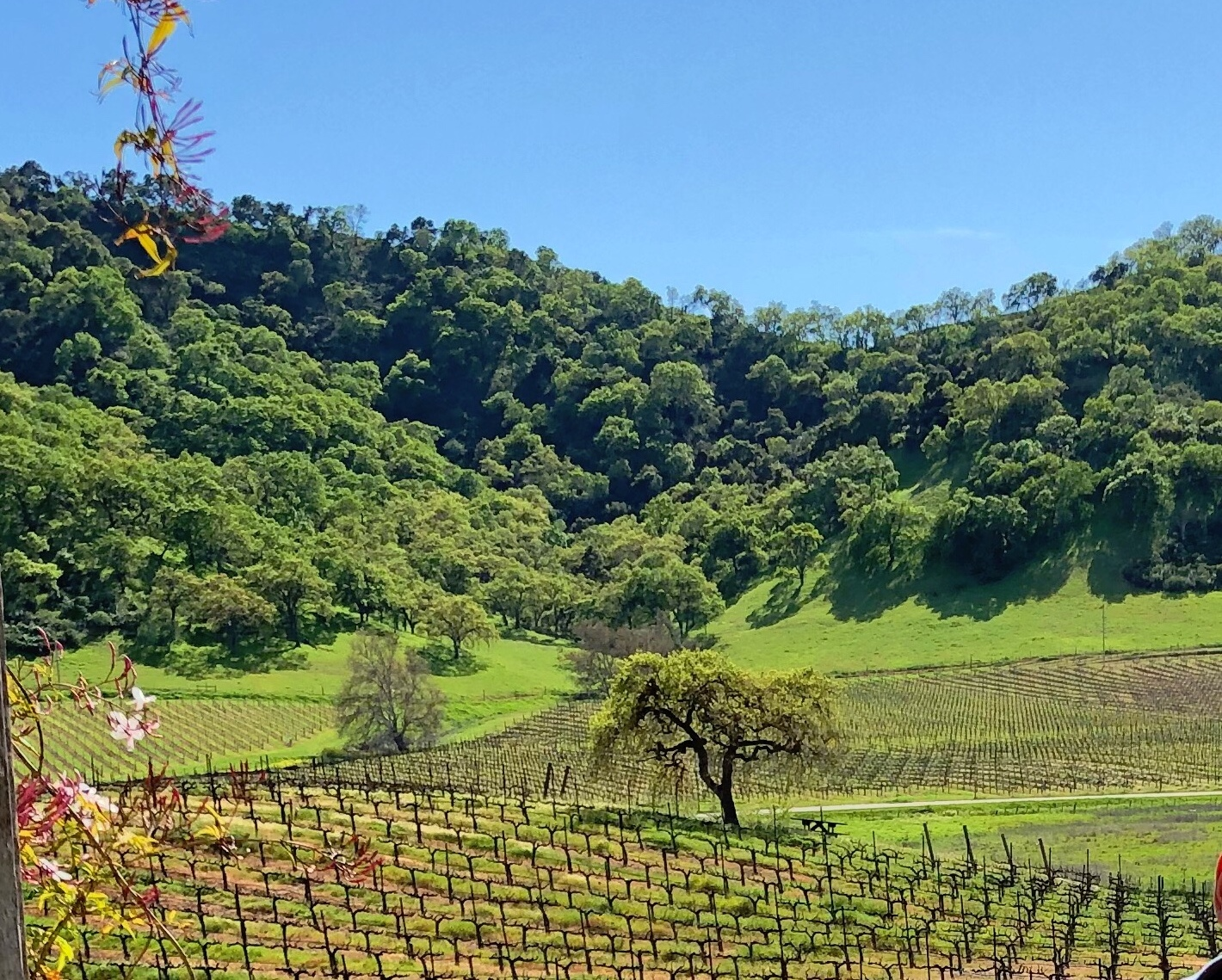
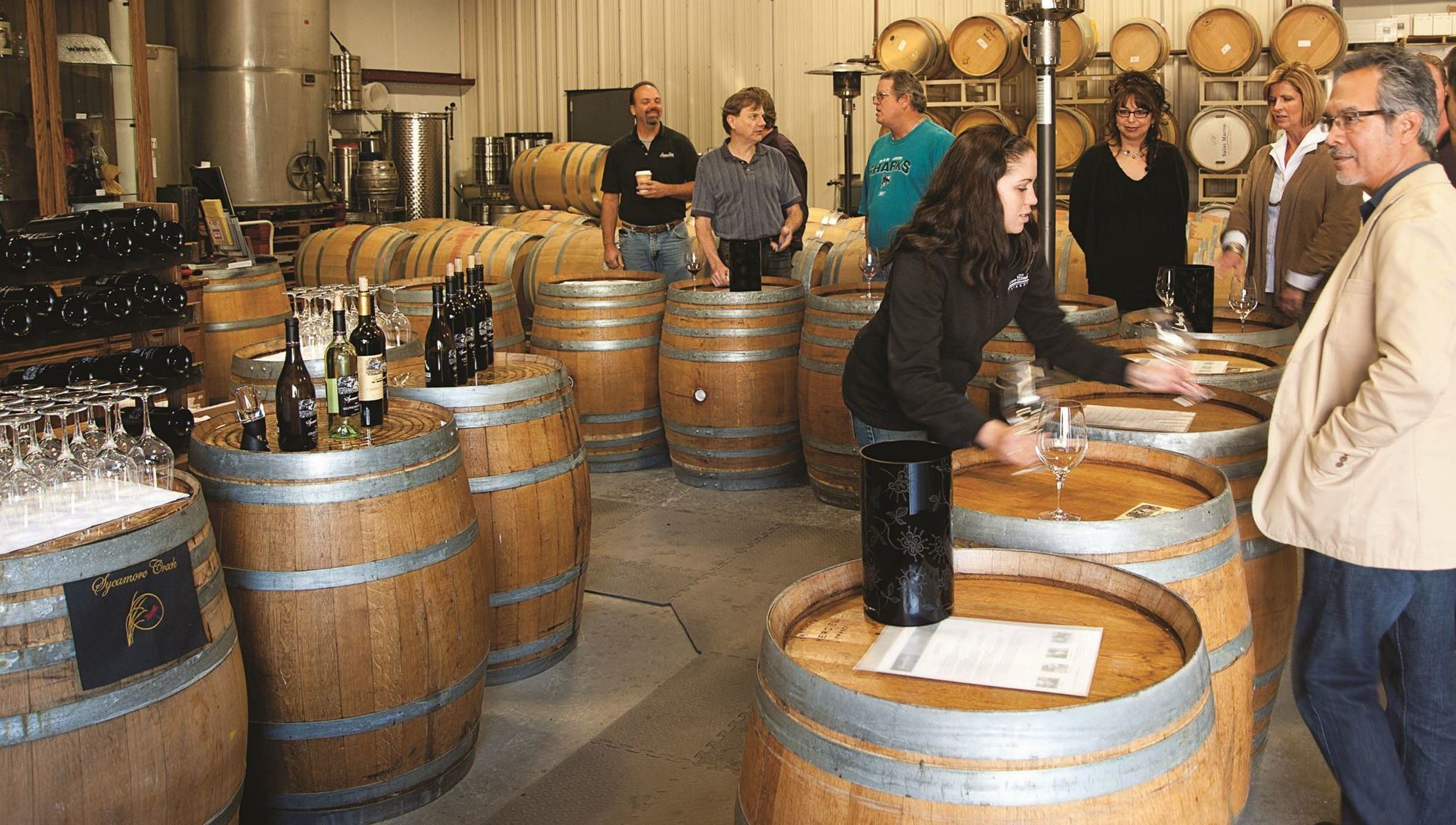
Morgan Hill is a popular wine tourism destination, home to numerous wineries as part of the Santa Clara Valley AVA.

According to Forbes, Morgan Hill is one of the top 500 most expensive places to live in the United States. Business Insider ranked Morgan Hill as the 479th most expensive housing market in the United States, owing to its concentration of high-net-worth individuals and restrictive growth policies.

Morgan Hill, along with Saratoga, San Martin, and Gilroy make up the Santa Clara Valley AVA, a designated American Viticultural Area for wineries and vineyards within the historic Santa Clara Valley.

Numerous companies of other industries are based in Morgan Hill as well, such as Specialized Bicycle Components, a major global manufacturer of high performance bicycles.

Morgan Hill is served by The Morgan Hill Times, a weekly newspaper founded in 1894 and published by New SV Media. The biweekly Morgan Hill Life lifestyle publication, founded in 2013, is published by Morgan Hill Life, LLC.

=== Technology ===
Notable high tech companies that are headquartered or have their American headquarters in Morgan Hill include Anritsu (Japanese telecommunications company), Flextronics (the world's second largest electronics-manufacturing service provider), Velodyne (sensor and laser developer), Hypnos Entertainment (video game company), Toray Advanced Composites (Dutch advanced composite materials manufacturer), and Paramit Corporation, a high tech medical device manufacturer.

High tech companies that have research and development or manufacturing facilities in Morgan Hill include the Harris Corporation (information and defense contractor based in the Madrone district), Infineon Technologies (semiconductor and chip manufacturer), and NxEdge Inc., a semiconductor and business solutions company.

=== Top employers ===
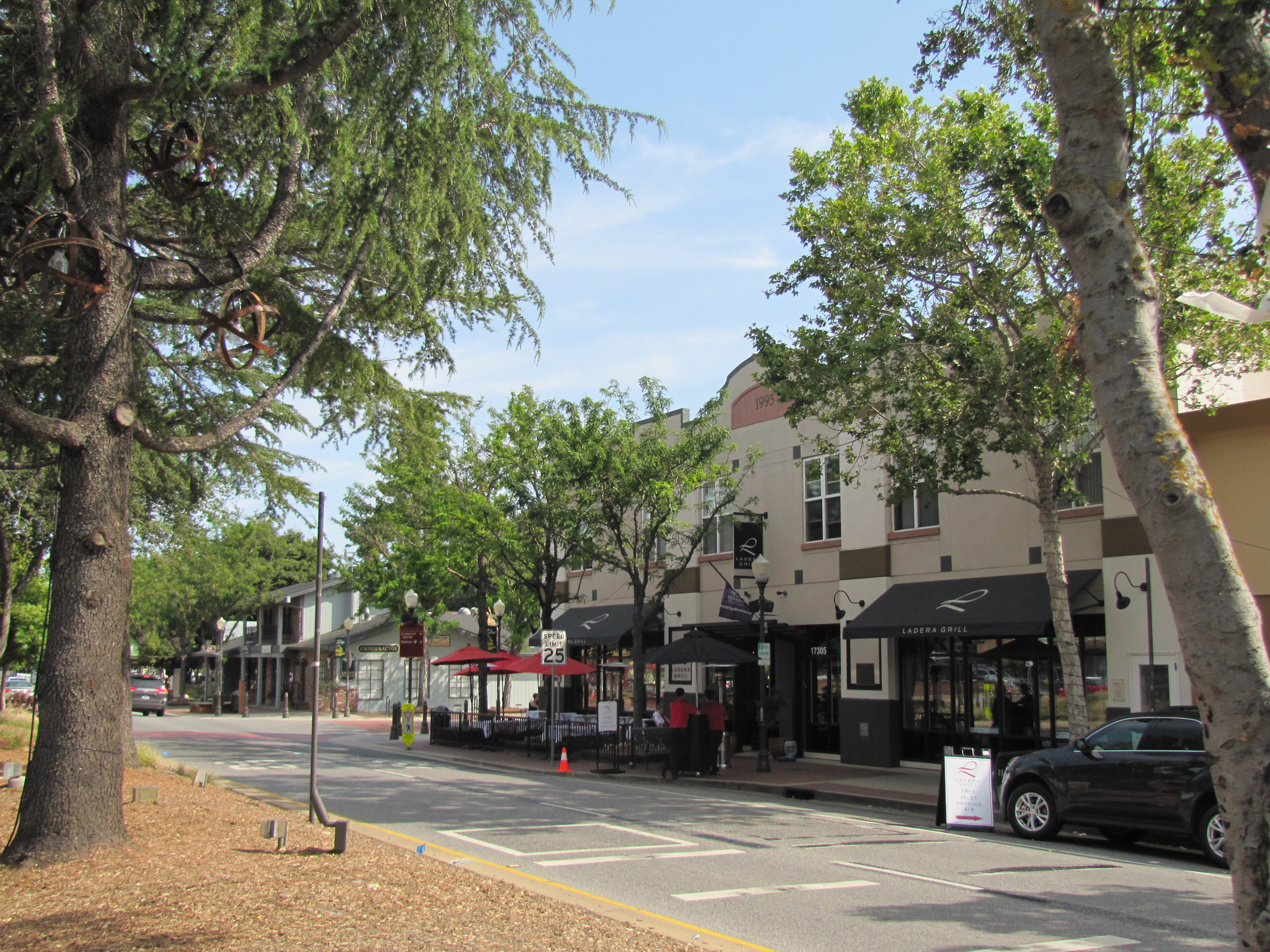
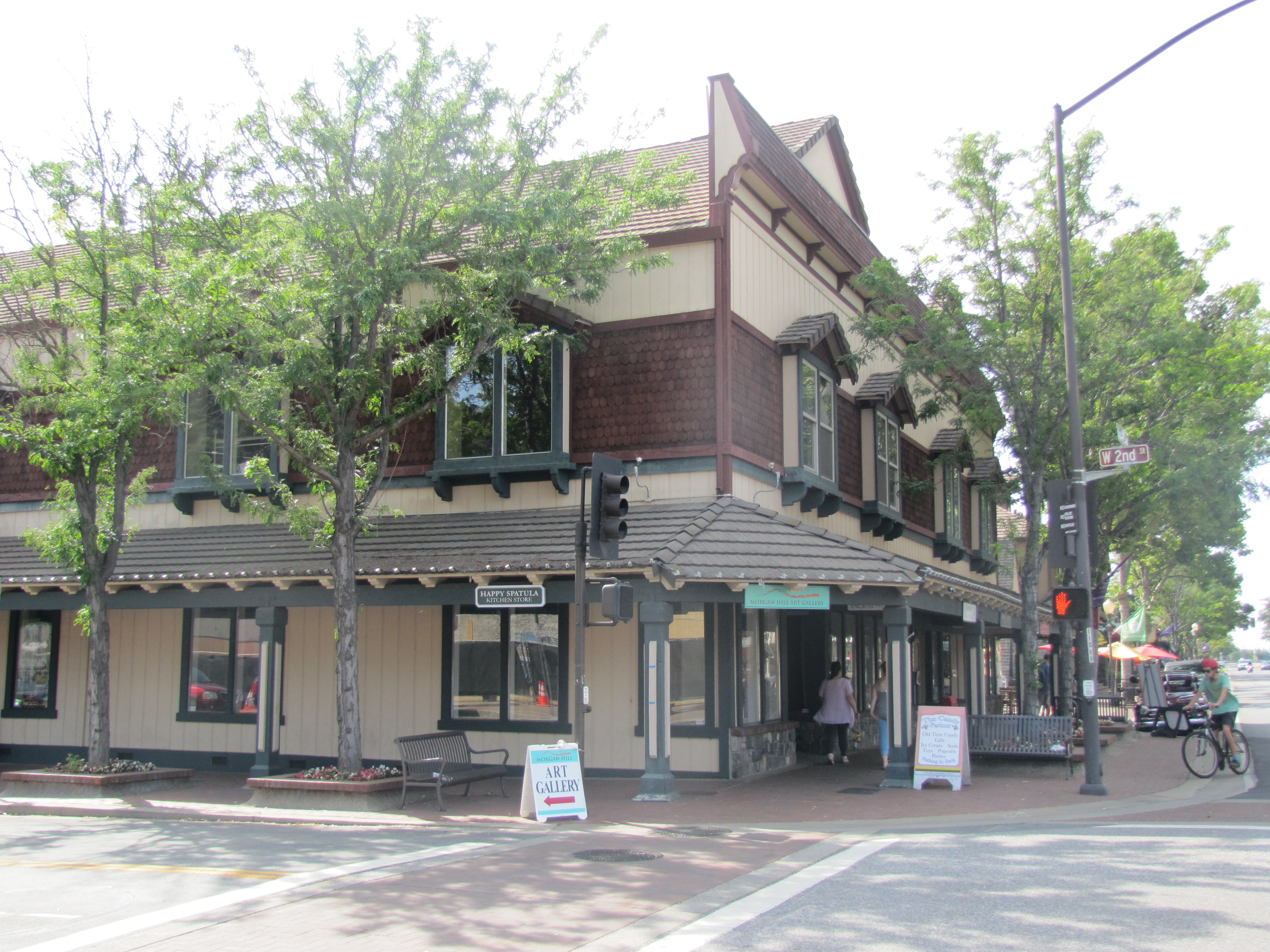
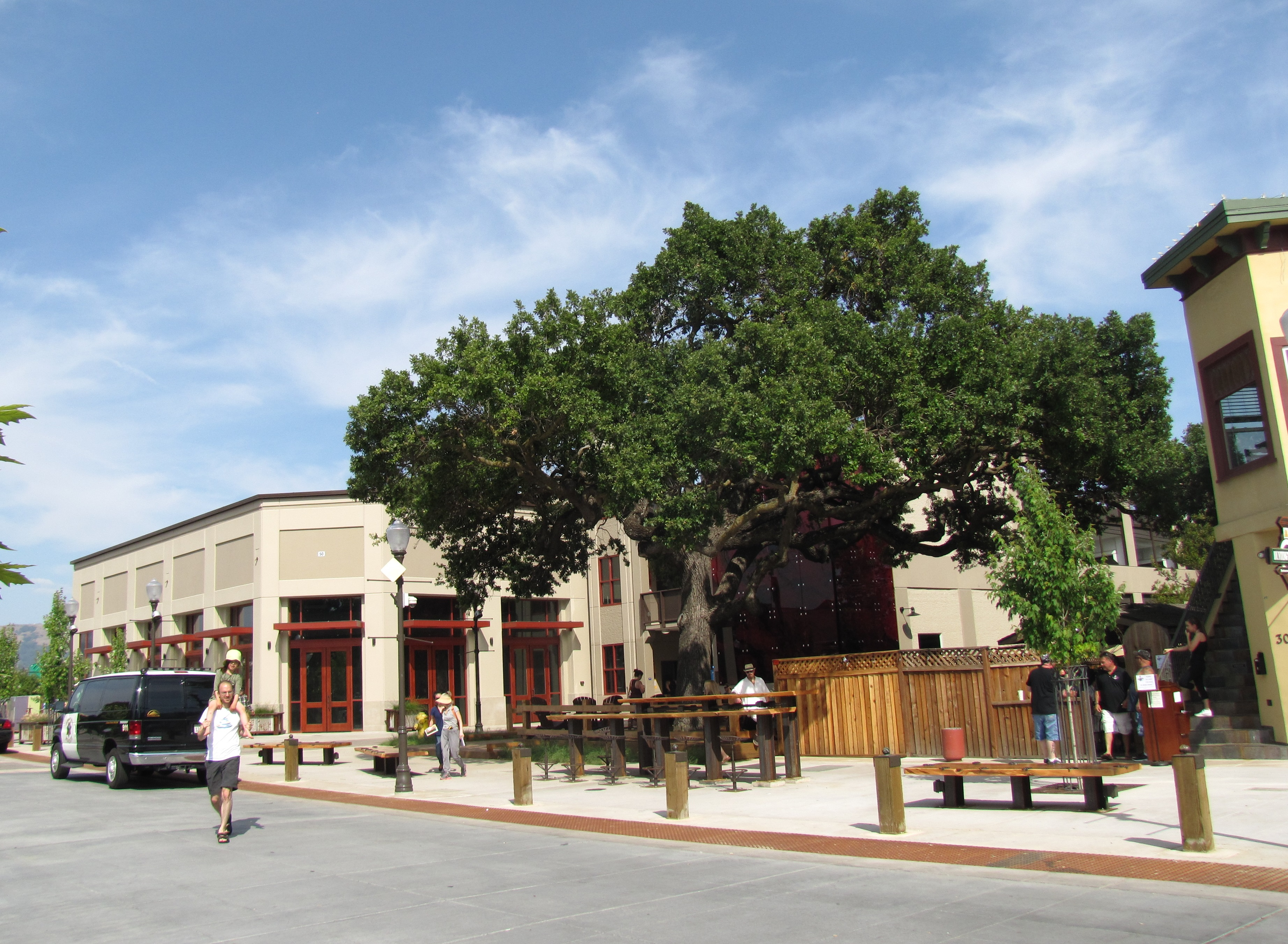
Downtown Morgan Hill on Monterey Rd. (top and center) and Third Street Plaza (bottom)

According to the city's 2018 Employment Report, the top employers in the city are:

No.	Employer	No. of Employees
1	Morgan Hill Unified School District	900
2	Anritsu	480
3	Specialized Bicycle Components	380
4	Paramit Corporation	300
5	CalDoor	300
6	NxEdge	280
7	Lusamerica Foods	270
8	Mission Bell Manufacturing	250
9	Toray Advanced Composites	250
10	Infineon Technologies	240
11	Safeway	230
12	Velodyne	200

== Culture ==
The Mushroom Mardi Gras Festival is an annual celebration established in 1980 by fire chief Brad Spencer, who wanted to raise money for his fire department affected by Prop 13. The festival primarily celebrates the mushroom as a homage to the city's original nickname, the Mushroom Capital of the World.

The Poppy Jasper International Film Festival (PJIFF) is an annual event managed by the non-profit organization Poppy Jasper, Inc. It was established in 2004 by Mattie Scariot as a fundraiser on MHAT, Morgan Hill's public-access television channel. Since its establishment, PJIFF features films produced by people of multiple backgrounds.

== Parks and recreation ==
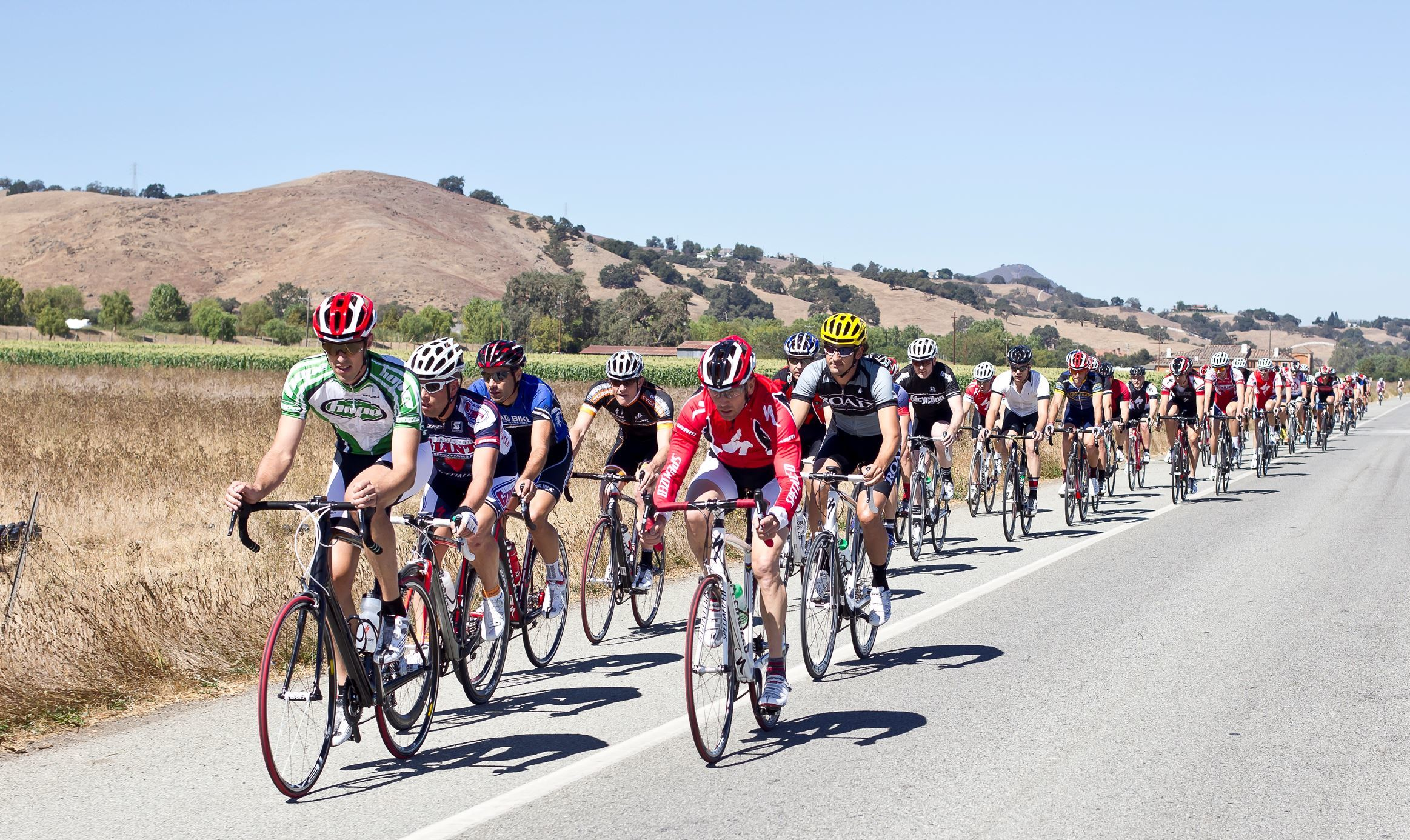
Morgan Hill is a major cycling destination, known for hosting the Tour of California, for being home to Specialized Bicycle Co., and for its bicycle culture.

- Anderson Lake County Park, immediately east of Morgan Hill
- Coyote Creek Parks & Trails, north of Morgan Hill, extending to San Jose
- Henry W. Coe State Park, the second-largest state park in California
- Uvas Canyon County Park, located a few miles west of Morgan Hill in the Santa Cruz Mountains
- Galvan Park
- Morgan Hill Community Park, including a skate park and off-leash dog park
- Centennial Recreation Center, with gymnasium, indoor swimming pool, senior center, youth center and computer facility
- Morgan Hill Community and Cultural Center, amphitheater and satellite campus of Gavilan College
- Morgan Hill Aquatic Center
- Morgan Hill Outdoor Sports Center
- Villa Mira Monte

== Government ==
Morgan Hill's government is composed of the Morgan Hill City Council, its legislative branch; the mayor of Morgan Hill, its semi-executive branch; and the departments of Morgan Hill City Hall. The current mayor of Morgan Hill is Mark Turner, who was elected to office in November 2022. The current Morgan Hill City Manager is Christina Turner.

In the California State Legislature, Morgan Hill is in the 15th senatorial district, represented by Democrat Dave Cortese, and in the 28th Assembly district, represented by Democrat Gail Pellerin.

Federally, Morgan Hill is in California's 18th congressional district, represented by Democrat Zoe Lofgren.

The Morgan Hill Police Department is tasked with ensuring public safety within the city's incorporated borders. Chief Shane Palsgrove was appointed in 2020.

== Education ==
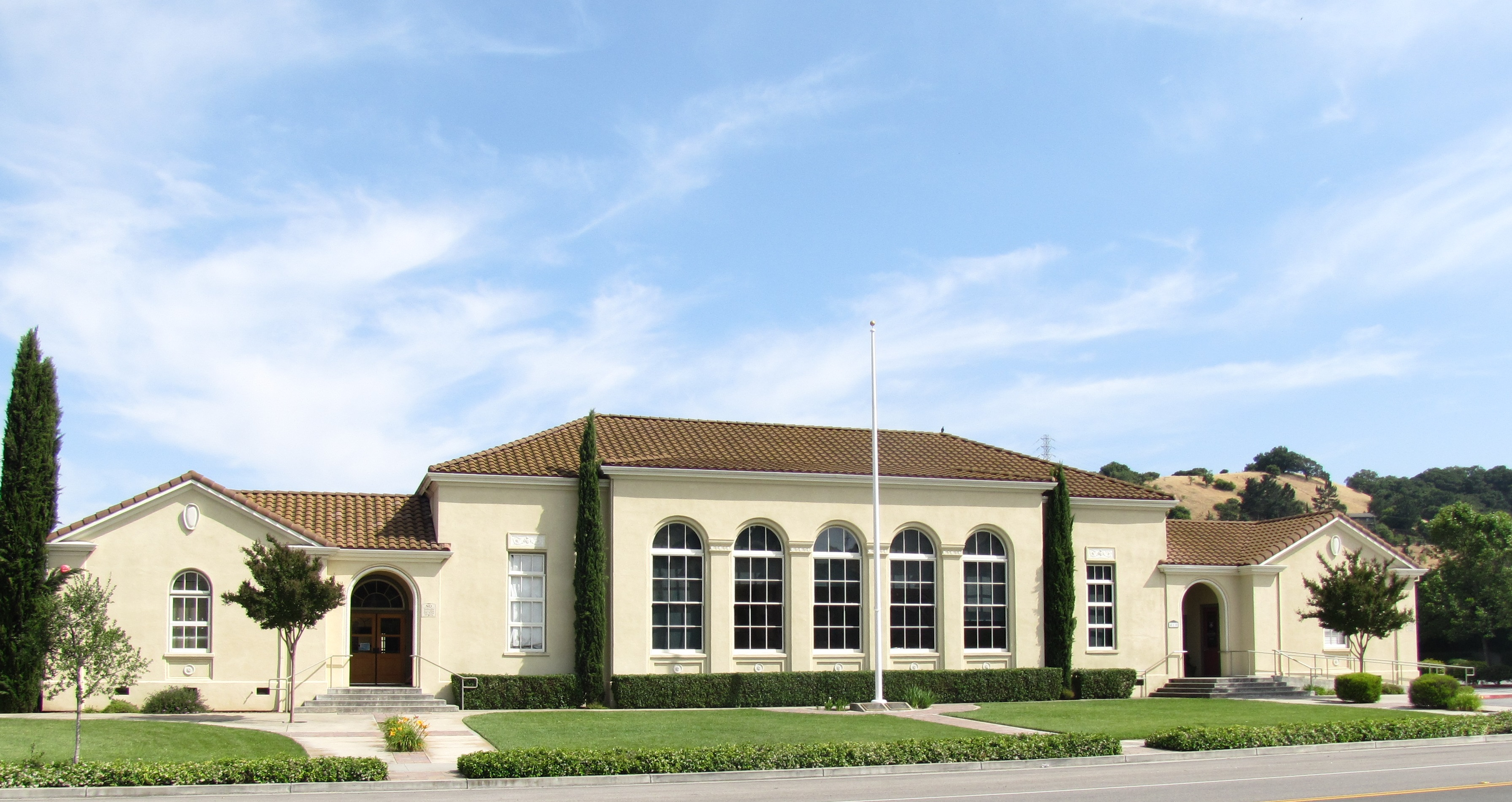
The historic Morgan Hill School Building, designed by noted California architect W. H. Weeks

=== Public education ===
The Morgan Hill Unified School District (MHUSD) serves the whole of Morgan Hill, as well as San Martin, California and Coyote Valley. MHUSD schools have variously been awarded as California Distinguished Schools and California Gold Ribbon Schools.

Morgan Hill's public high schools are:

- Live Oak High School
- Ann Sobrato High School (Ranked among the top 100 best public schools in California)
- Central High School (continuation)

Alongside its traditional schools, MHUSD, in partnership with The Tech Interactive, a Silicon Valley institution, operates 4 specialized public "focus academies", through its Tech Academies Initiative: Focus Academies will provide the opportunity for students to specialize their studies within broad fields (STEAM, music, health sciences), allowing for in-depth learning within subjects and programs designed by subject experts, including scientists from The Tech Museum of Innovation and Stanford University medical professors.

- Paradise Valley Engineering Academy
- P.A. Walsh STEAM Academy (run in partnership with The Tech Interactive)
- Jackson Academy of Math & Music
- El Toro Health Science Academy (first elementary-level health sciences program in California; created alongside Stanford University)
- San Martin/G Winn Dual Immersion Multicultural Education (90/10 Spanish and English Dual Language Immersion)

Morgan Hill also hosts a campus of Gavilan College.

=== Private education ===
Morgan Hill is also home to numerous private school, both religious and nonsectarian in nature.

Nonsectarian schools:

- Oakwood School
- Stratford School

Religious schools:

- Saint Catherine Catholic School
- Crossroads Christian School
- Spring Academy, alternative Christian school
- Shadow Mountain Baptist School

== Infrastructure ==
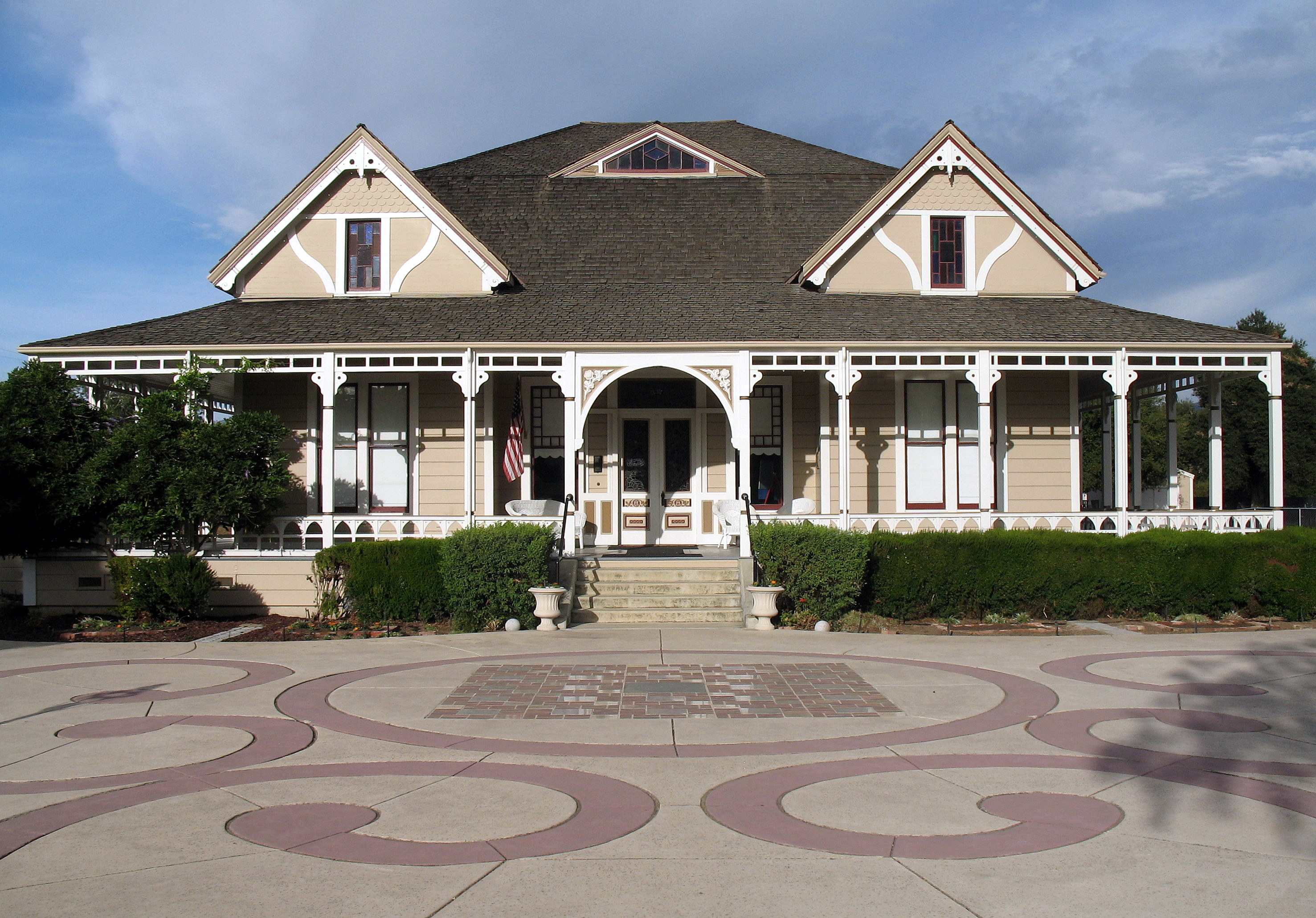
Villa Mira Monte was built in 1884 by Hiram Morgan Hill. It currently houses the Morgan Hill Museum & Historical Society.

=== Public transportation ===
- The Santa Clara Valley Transportation Authority provides local buses and express buses to Gilroy, San Martin, San Jose, Santa Clara, and Sunnyvale.
- Caltrain's Morgan Hill station provides weekday rush-hour commuter rail service to San Jose, the rest of Silicon Valley, the Peninsula and San Francisco.
- Monterey–Salinas Transit runs a rush-hour San Jose-Monterey express bus, Line 55, that also serves as an Amtrak Thruway connection.

=== Public libraries ===
Santa Clara County Library District operates the Morgan Hill Library, which was renamed after former mayor Steve Tate.

== Notable people ==
=== Early settlers ===
- Hiram Morgan Hill (1848–1913) more commonly known as "Morgan Hill", bank clerk and rancher
- Daniel Martin Murphy (1826–1882) Canadian-born American settler and rancher
- Tiburcio Vásquez (1835–1875), famed Californio outlaw

=== Culture ===
- Don Argue, former president of Northwest University
- Kayla Cromer, television actor
- Cornelia Barns, activist
- Mary Blair, The Walt Disney Company animator
- Dennis Johnson, composer and mathematician
- Charles Kellogg, Californian naturalist and actor
- Kelly Moore, New York Times Best Selling author

=== Sciences ===
- Charles Edward Barns, astronomer and author
- Konstantin Batygin, Caltech astronomer
- Ole Fahlin, aviator and Lockheed Martin developer
- Joseph Gordon II, chemist credited with 12 patents
- Stephen C. Johnson, AT&T and Bell Labs computer scientist
- Robert Royston, landscape architect

=== Athletics ===
- Jared Allen, football player for the Chicago Bears
- Bill Berry, former basketball coach for the Chicago Bulls
- Ricky Berry, basketball player for the Sacramento Kings
- Ron Caragher, football coach for the San Jose State Spartans and University of San Diego
- Scott Clark, BMX world champion
- Harold Davis, track and field athlete, a World Record holder in the 100 metres
- Jerry Doggett, famed MLB sportscaster
- Mervyn Fernandez, football player for the Oakland Raiders
- Romina Gupta, Team USA gold medal gymnastics champion
- Cade Hall, college football defensive end
- Rhett Hall, football player for the Philadelphia Eagles
- Jarod Hatch, swimmer who competed at the 2024 Summer Olympics
- James Hibbard, cycling champion and writer
- Daniel Holloway, cyclist and multiple National Criterium champion
- Zhang Jinjing, Chinese Olympic gymnast
- Marina Klimova, Soviet Olympic ice dancer
- Ryan Neufeld, football player for the Dallas Cowboys
- Sergei Ponomarenko, competitive ice dancer
- Dave Salzwedel, soccer player for the San Jose Clash
- Alatini Saulala, Tongan rugby player for the USA National Team
- Conrad Stoltz, four time XTERRA Triathlon
- Jeff Ulbrich, football coach for the Atlanta Falcons, former player for the San Francisco 49ers

== Sister cities ==
Morgan Hill has five sister city affiliations:

- (Republic of Ireland) Headford, County Galway, Ireland
- San Casciano in Val di Pesa, Tuscany, Italy
- Mizuho, Tokyo, Japan
- San Martín de Hidalgo, Jalisco, Mexico
- Seferihisar, Izmir, Turkey

== Gallery ==
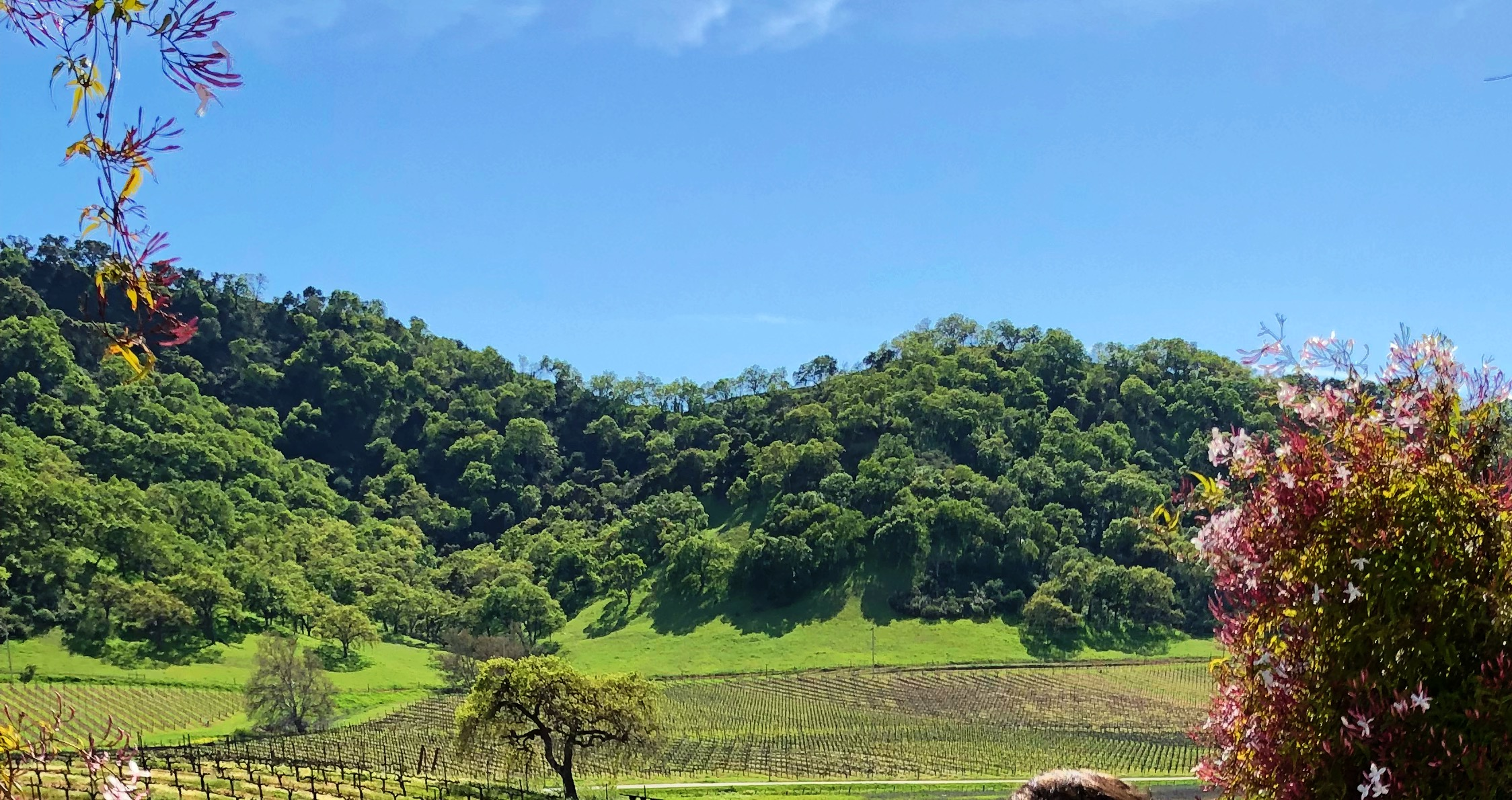
Santa Clara Valley AVA winery in Morgan Hill

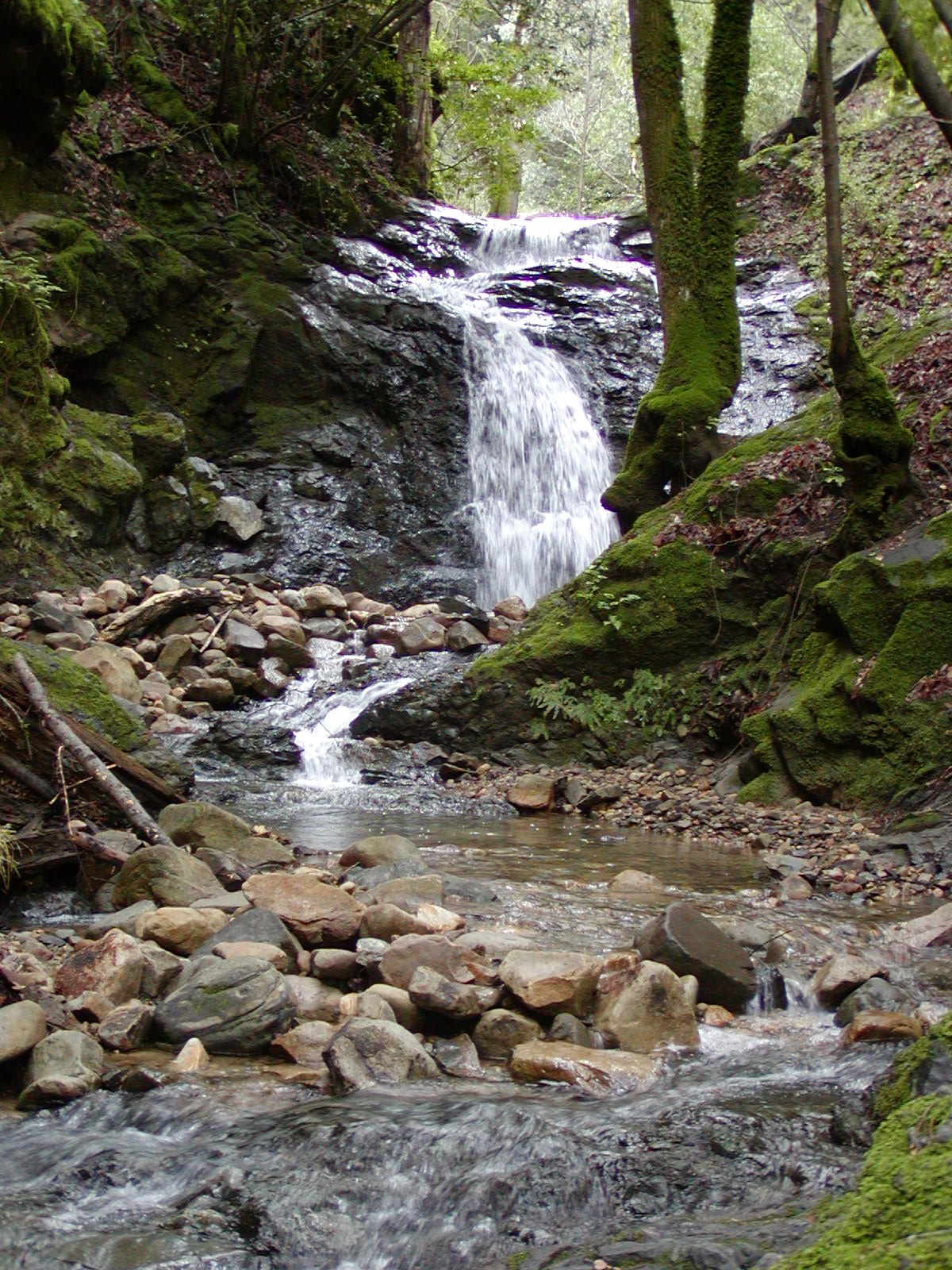
Upper Falls in Uvas Canyon County Park

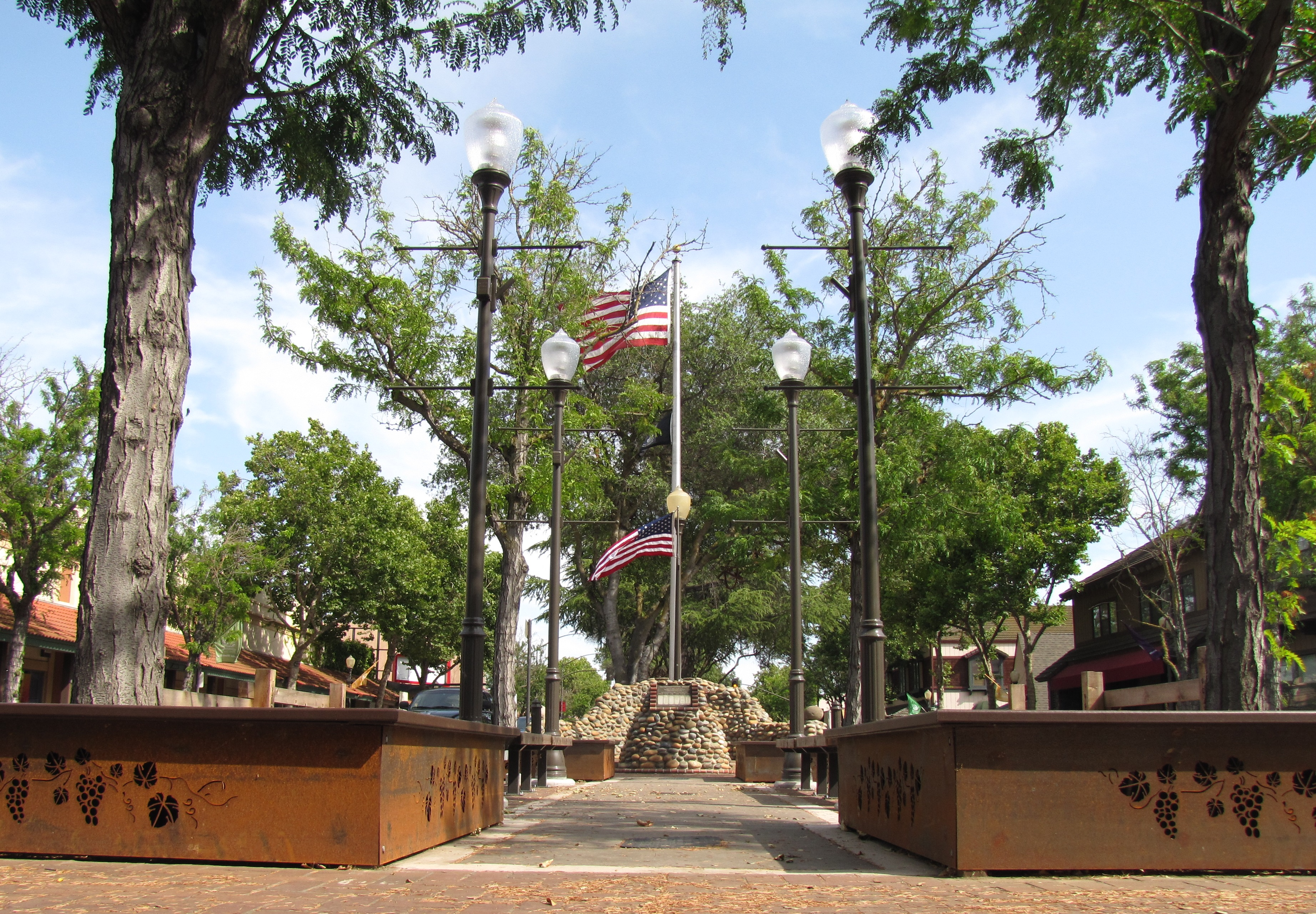
Veterans Memorial Plaza

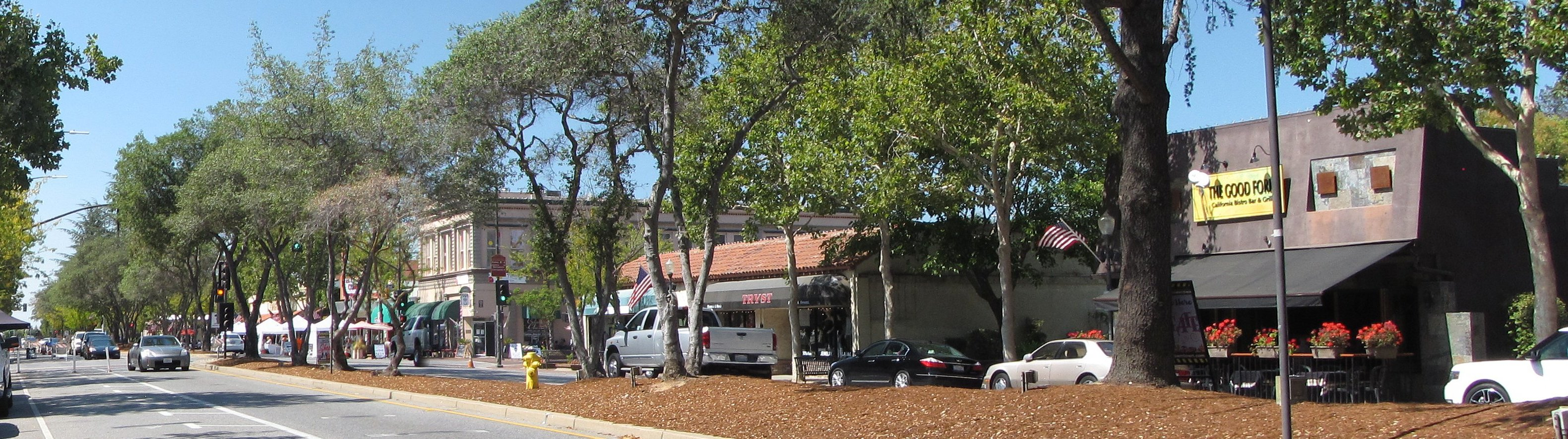
Downtown Morgan Hill on Monterey Rd.

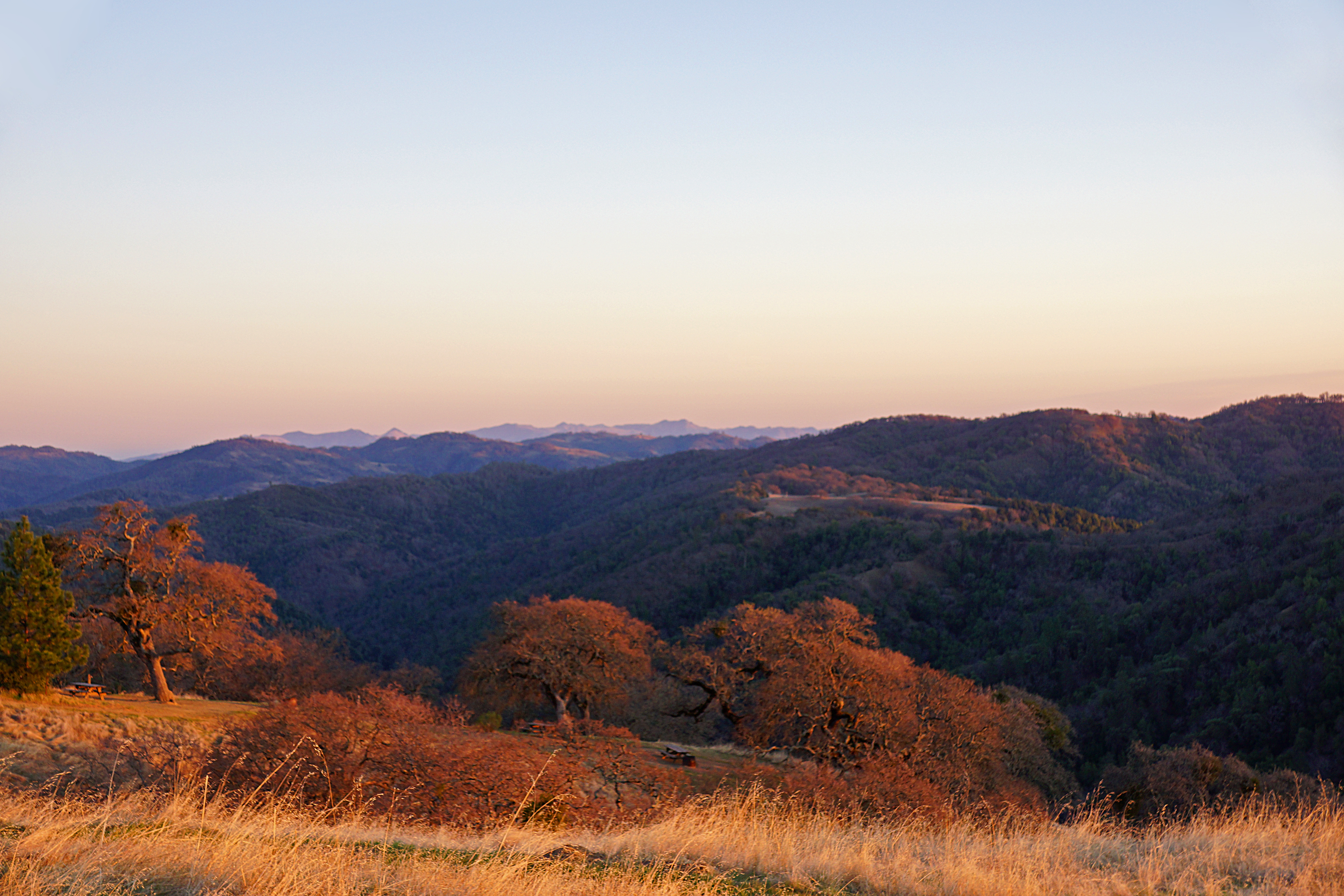
Henry W. Coe State Park in the Diablo Range

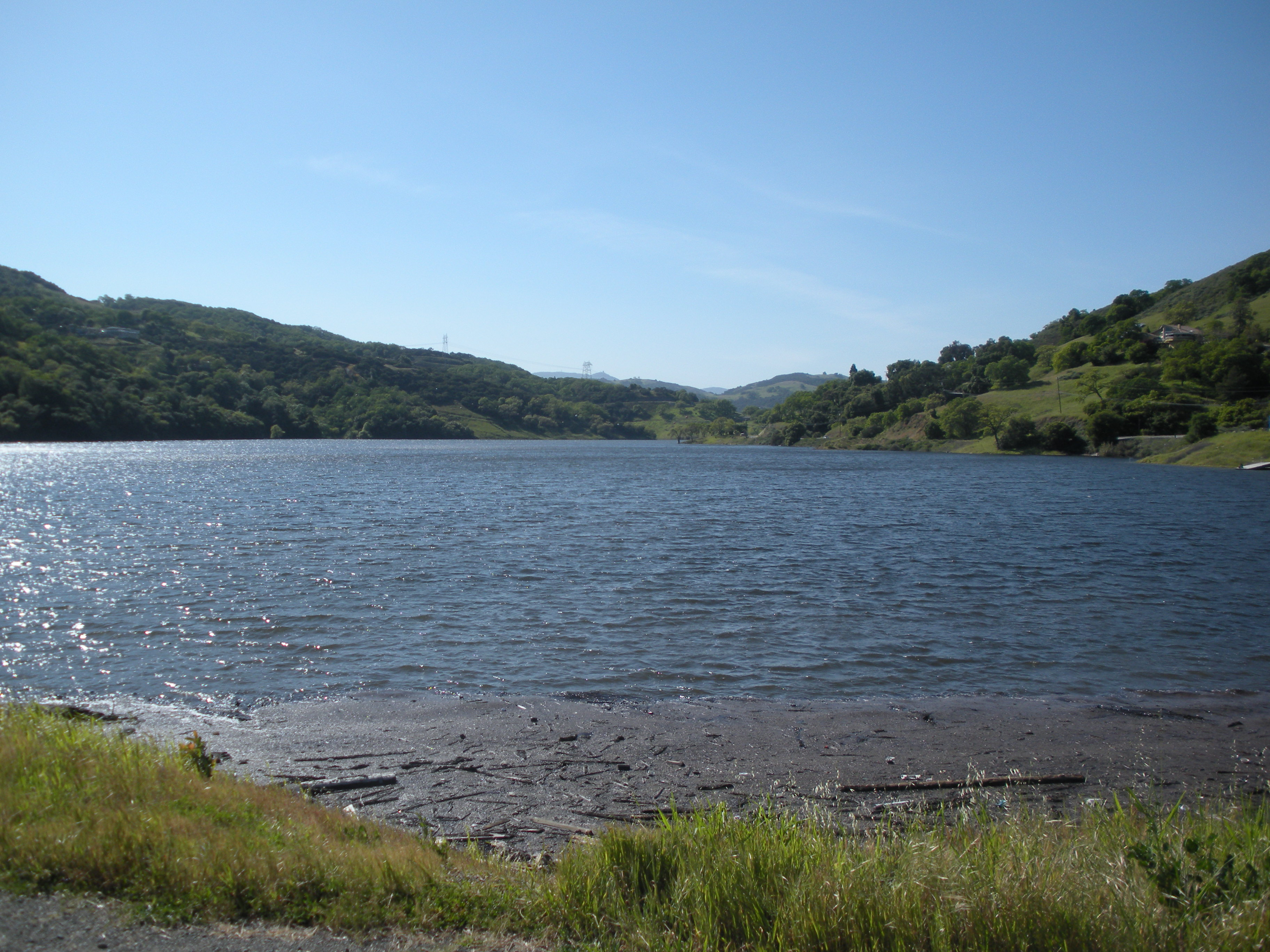
Chesbro Reservoir in western Morgan Hill

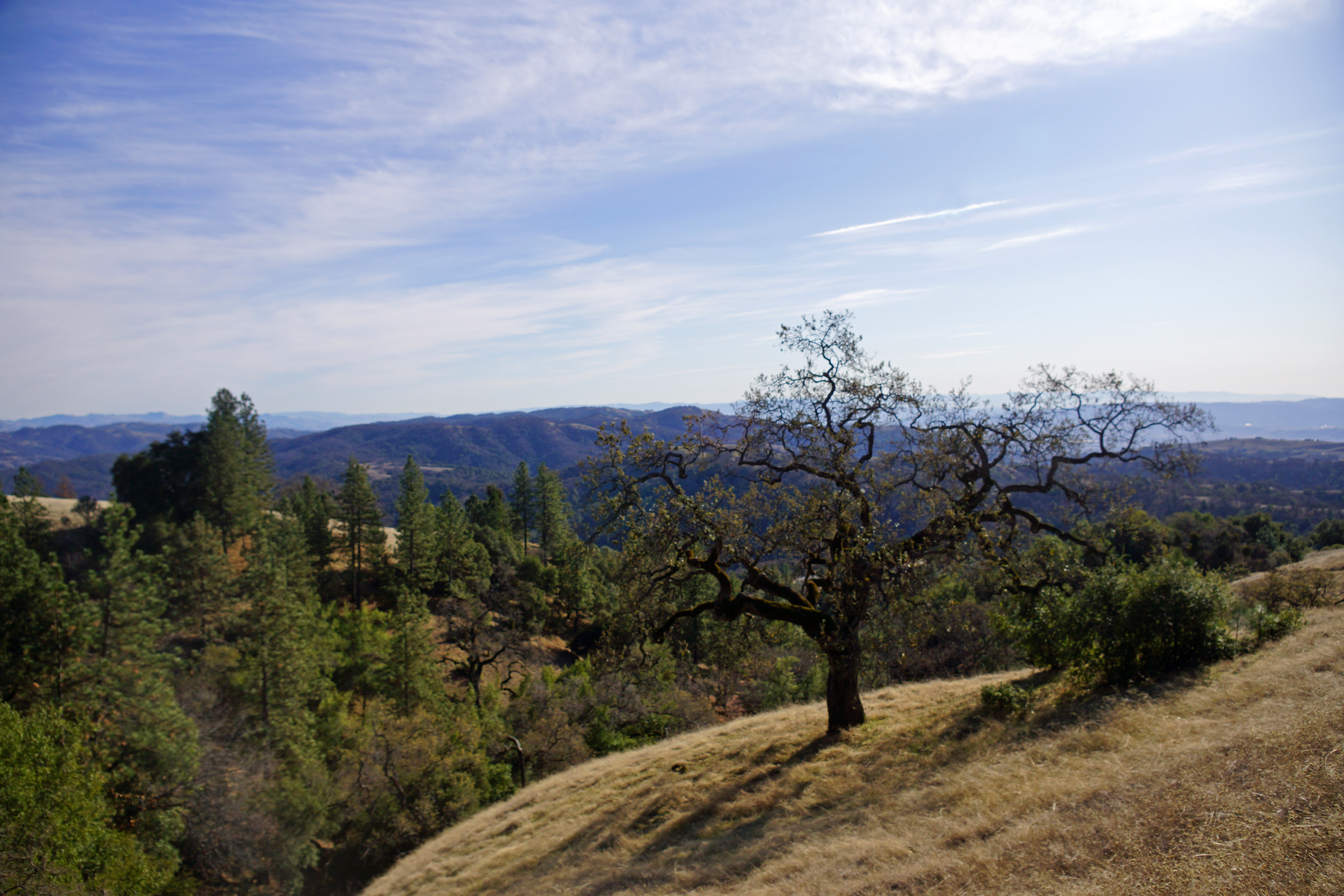
Henry W. Coe State Park in eastern Morgan Hill

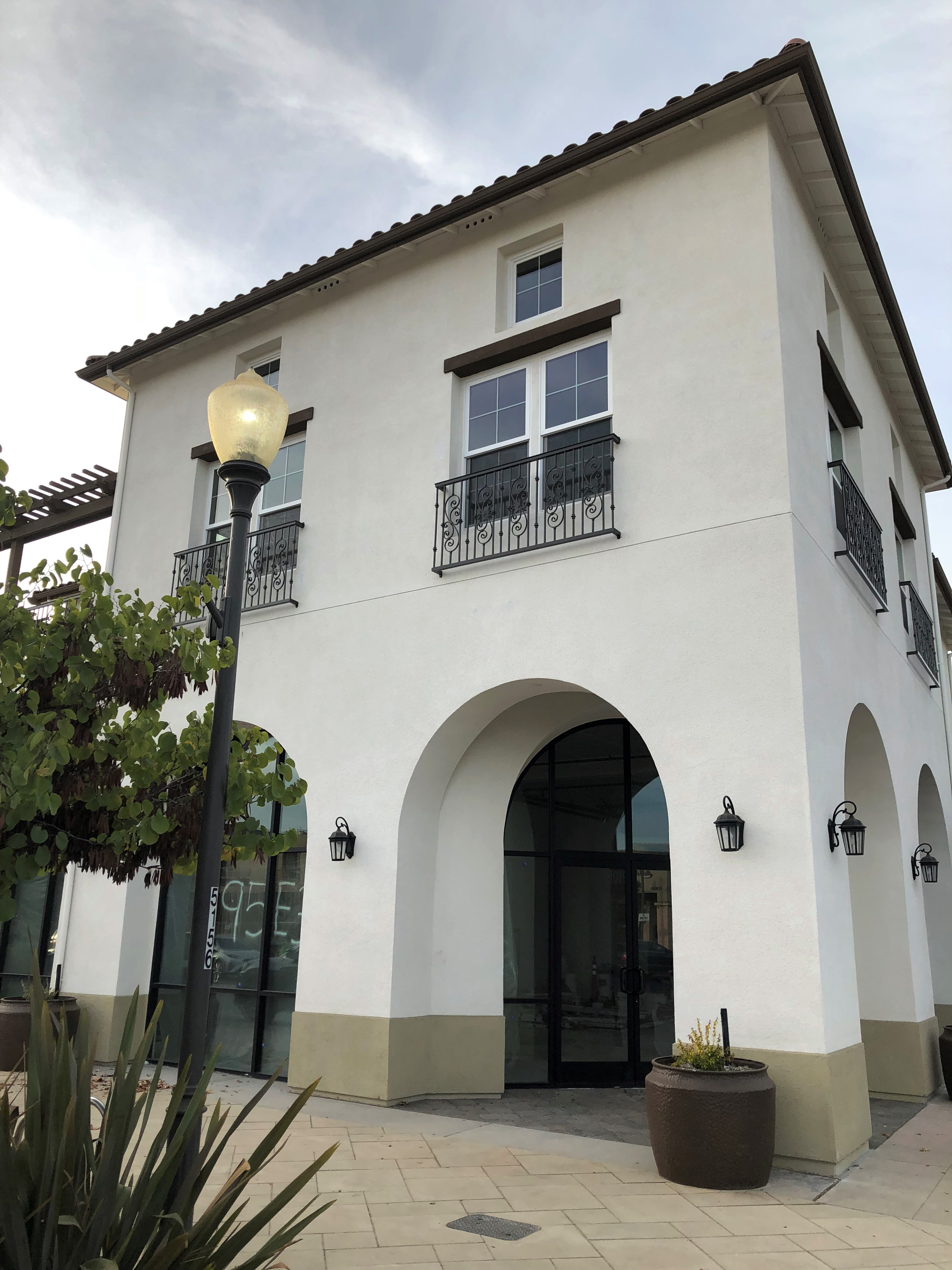
Third Street Plaza, Downtown

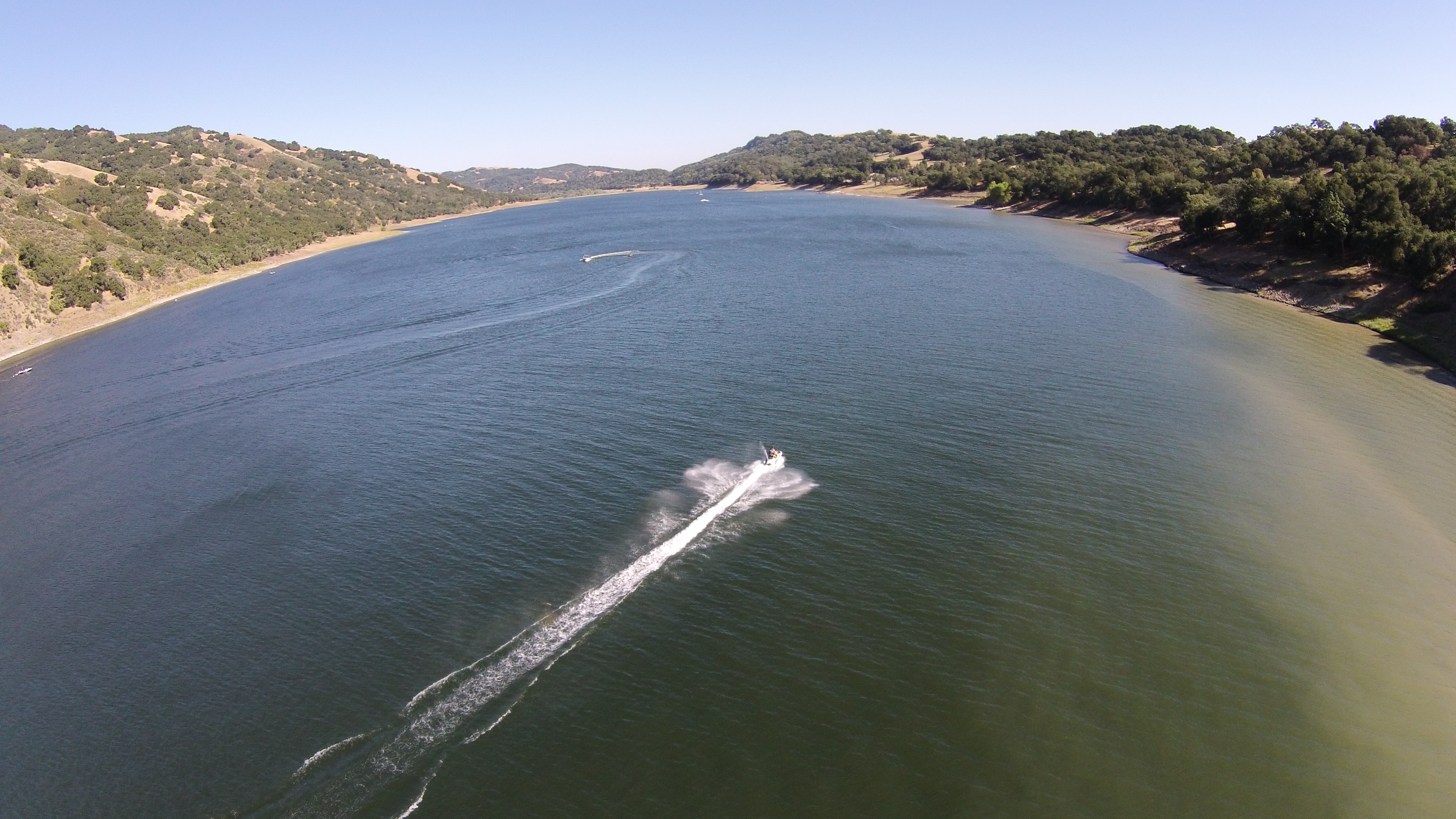
Coyote Lake in southern Morgan Hill

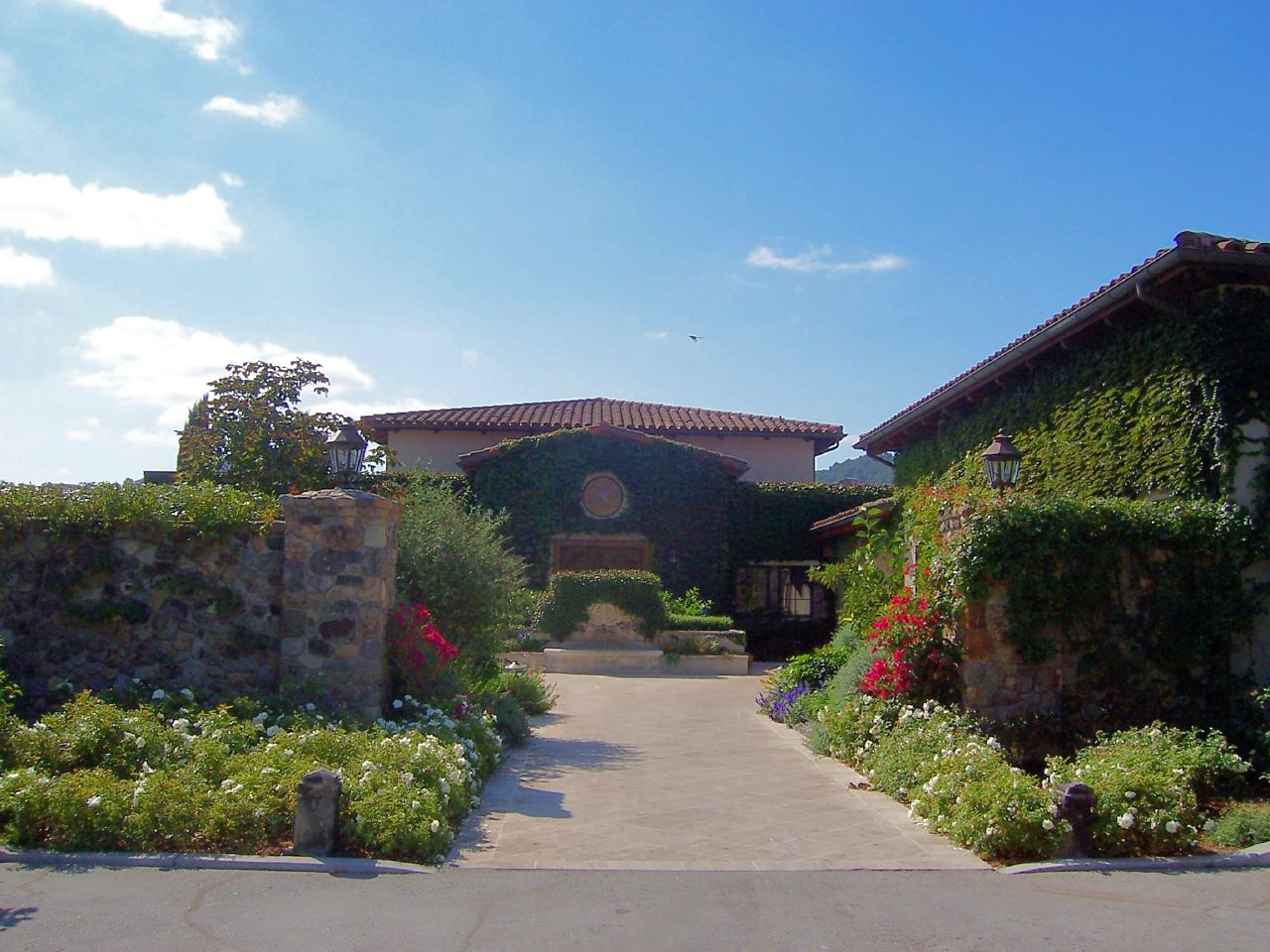
Clos la Chance Vineyards

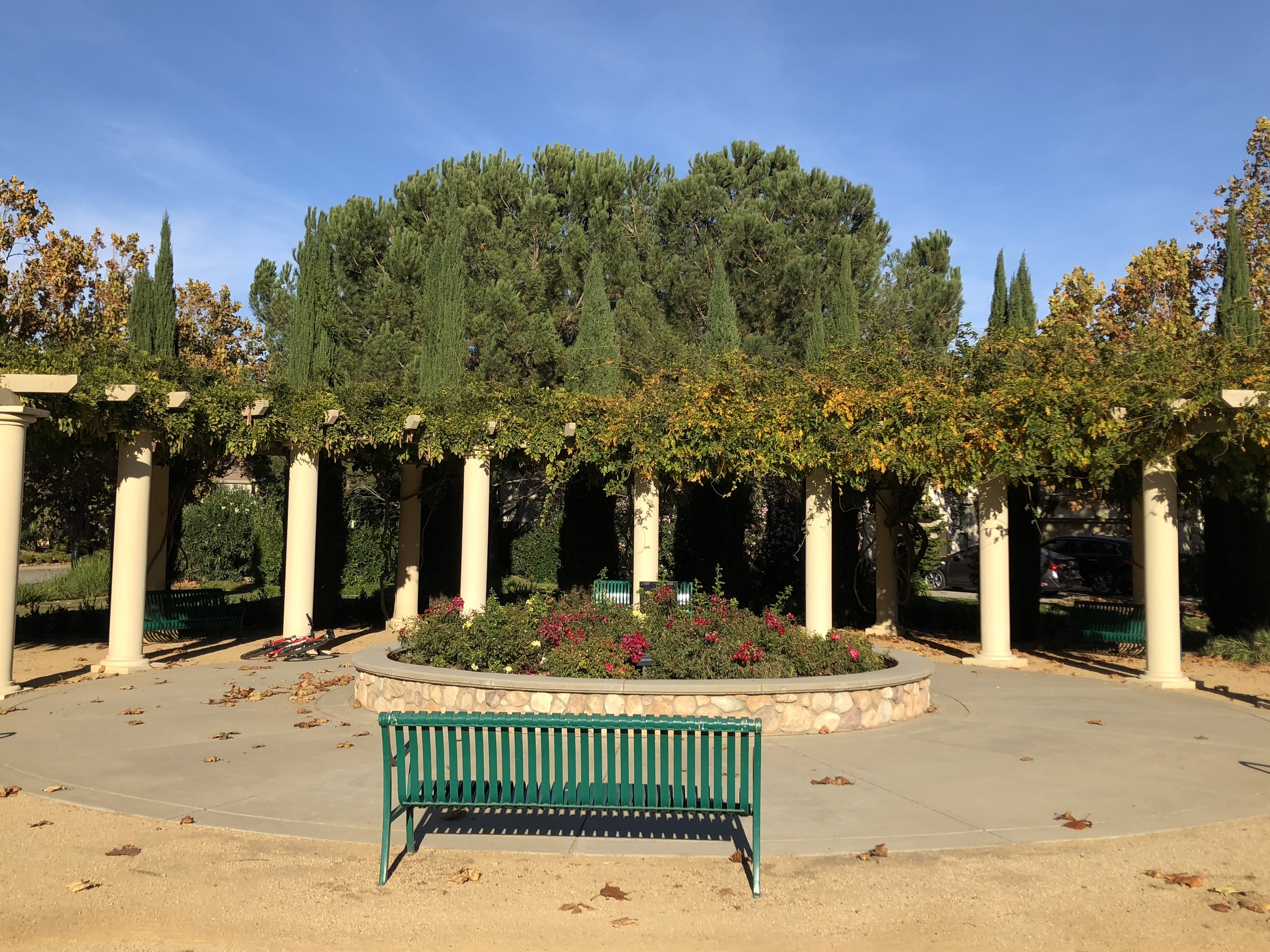
Madrone, Morgan Hill

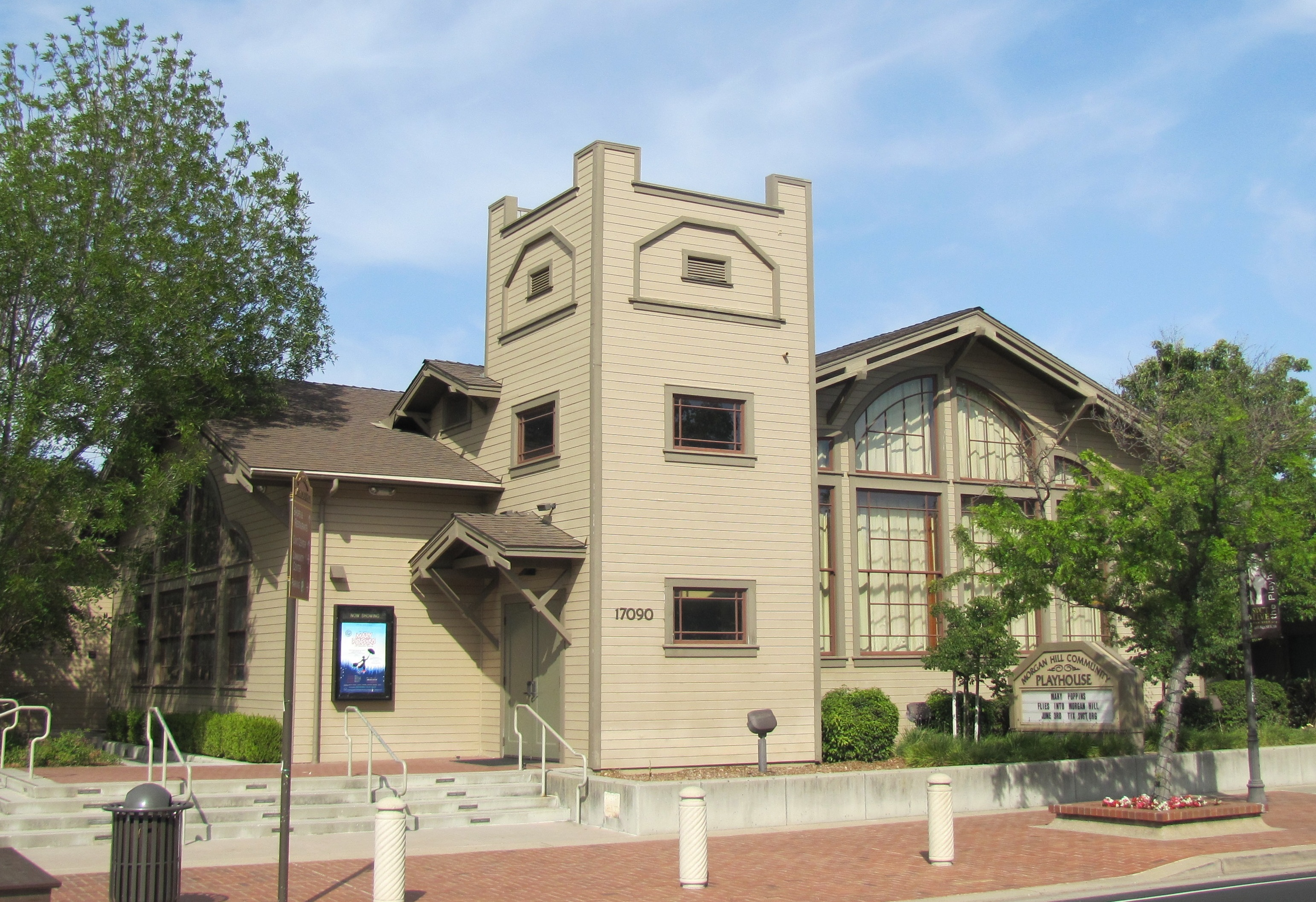
Morgan Hill Playhouse

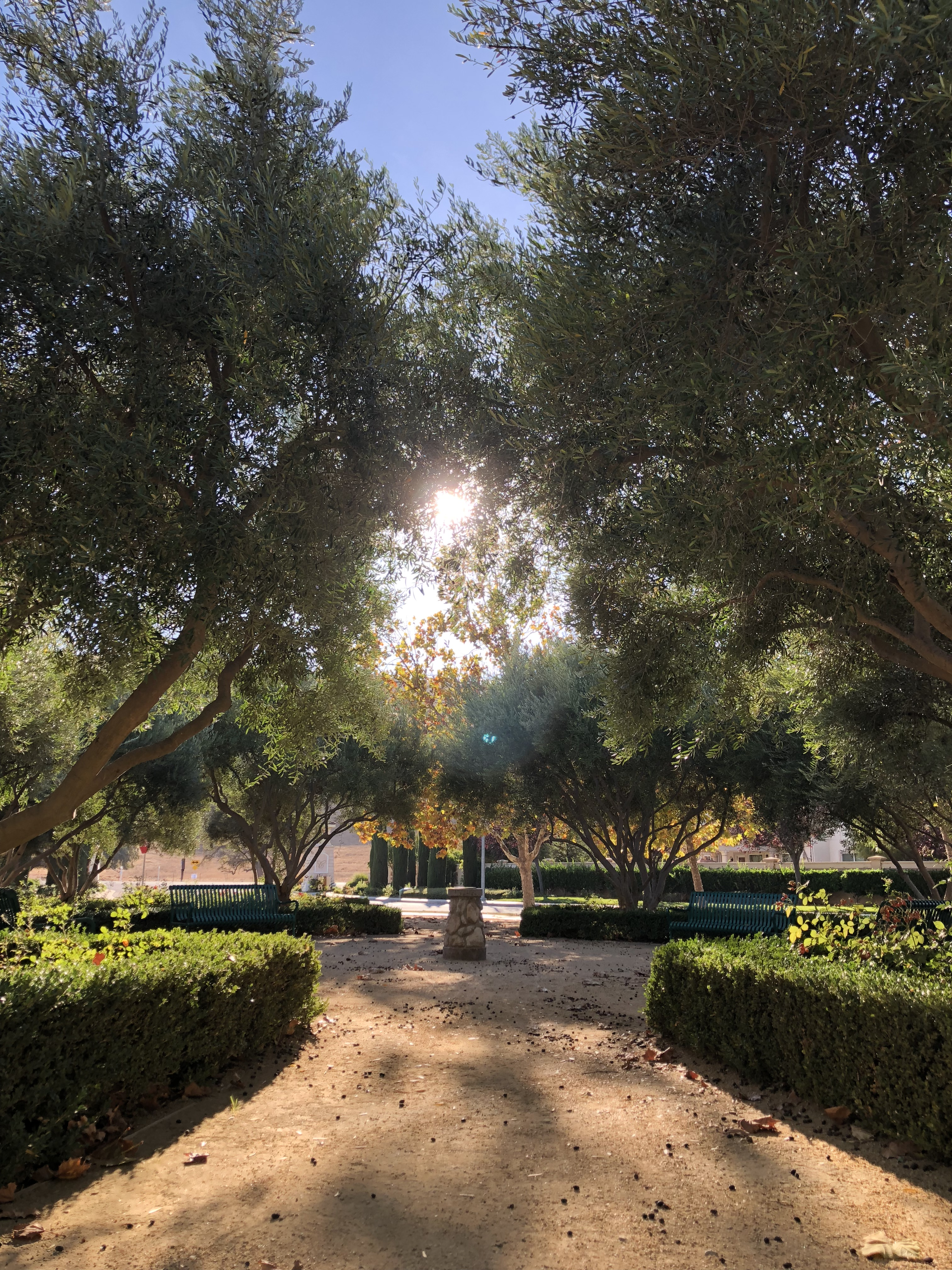
Capriano Park in Madrone

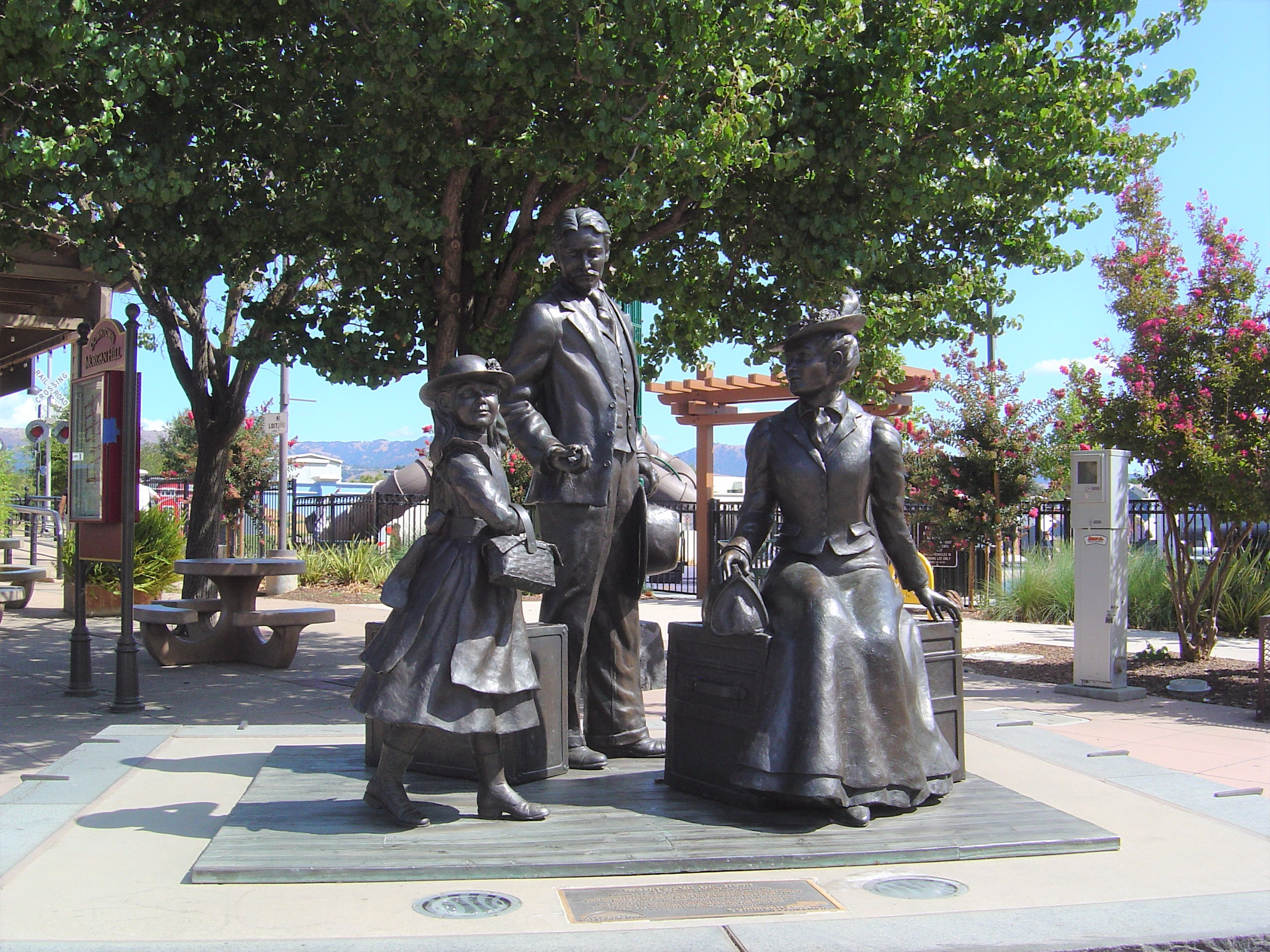
Hiram Morgan Hill, Diana Murphy Hill, and their daughter Diane Murphy Hill

== See also ==
- List of California locations by income
