= Pinewood School, Los Altos =

Pinewood School
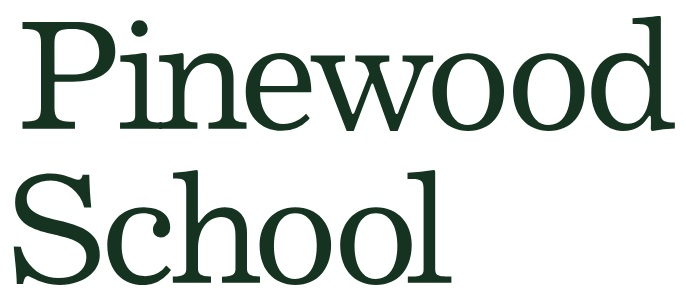

Location
- Los Altos, California; United States; 37°22′3.14″N 122°6′20.94″W

Information
- Type: Private, Non-Sectarian
- Established: 1959
- Sister school: Oakwood School, Morgan Hill
- Head of school: Scott Riches
- Grades: K-12
- Enrollment: 600
- Colors: Green and Gold
- Athletics conference: CIF Central Coast Section: West Bay Athletic League
- Mascot: Pinewood Panthers
- Tuition: $40,000-50,000
- Website: www.pinewood.edu

Pinewood School is a private, non-sectarian college preparatory school in the Silicon Valley communities of Los Altos and Los Altos Hills in Santa Clara County, California. The school was founded as an extracurricular center for performing arts. In the 1960s, it was renovated to become a full-time school. It consists of three campuses: Lower Campus, Middle Campus, and Upper Campus. The school is known for its performing arts and math courses, as well as Track and Field events.

== History ==
Founded in 1959 by Gwen Riches, the school began as an afternoon creative arts program. By 1964, enrollment had increased to 350 students, and the newly named Creative Workshop became established as a full-time private school.

Pinewood is the sister school of Oakwood School, Morgan Hill, which was founded by Gwen Riches' eldest daughter and her husband.

== Academics ==
Pinewood School is accredited by the Western Association of Schools and Colleges and is a member of the National Association of Independent Schools.

== Notable alumni ==
- John M. Chu, film director
- Larisa Oleynik, actress
- Sequoia Nagamatsu, author
