= List of places in California (M) =

List of places in California – M

This list of current:

- cities
- towns, unincorporated communities
- counties, and other recognized places in the U.S. state of California.

Information on the number and names of counties in which the place lies, and its lower and upper ZIP Code bounds, if applicable are also included.

Name of place	Number of counties	Principal county	Lower zip code	Upper zip code
Mabie	1	Plumas County		
McArthur	1	Modoc County	96053	
McArthur	1	Shasta County	96056	
McCampbell	1	Los Angeles County		
McCann	1	Humboldt County	95569	
McClellan Air Force Base	1	Sacramento County	95652	
McCloud	1	Siskiyou County	96057	
McColl	1	Shasta County		
McConnel	1	Sacramento County		
McCulloh	1	Placer County		
Macdoel	1	Siskiyou County	96058	
McFarland	1	Kern County	93250	
McGill	1	Sonoma County		
Machado	1	Los Angeles County		
McHenry	1	Stanislaus County		
McKay	1	Calaveras County		
McKay	1	San Luis Obispo County		
McKeon	1	Placer County	95603	
McKinleyville	1	Humboldt County	95521	
McKittrick	1	Kern County	93251	
McKnight Acres	1	Napa County	94590	
McLaren	1	San Francisco County	94134	
Maclay	1	Los Angeles County	91340	
McManus	1	El Dorado County		
McMillan Manor	1	Ventura County	93030	
McNear	1	Sonoma County		
McNears Beach	1	Marin County		
Macomber Palms	1	Riverside County		
McPherson	1	Orange County		
Madeline	1	Lassen County	96119	
Madera	1	Madera County	93637	39
Madera Acres	1	Madera County	93637	
Madison	1	Yolo County	95653	
Mad River	1	Trinity County	95552	
Madrone	1	Santa Clara County	95037	
Magalia	1	Butte County	95954	
Magnolia	1	Butte County		
Magnolia	1	Imperial County	92227	
Magnolia	1	Santa Barbara County	93111	
Magnolia	1	Tulare County		
Magnolia Center	1	Riverside County	92506	
Magnolia Park	1	Los Angeles County	91505	
Magra	1	Placer County	95717	
Mahou Riviera	1	Los Angeles County		
Maine Prairie	1	Solano County		
Majors	1	Santa Cruz County		
Malaga	1	Fresno County	93725	
Malibu	1	Los Angeles County	90265	
Malibu Beach	1	Los Angeles County	90265	
Malibu Bowl	1	Los Angeles County		
Malibu Canyon Homes	1	Los Angeles County	91364	
Malibu Heights	1	Los Angeles County	90265	
Malibu Hills	1	Los Angeles County		
Malibu Junction	1	Los Angeles County		
Malibu Vista	1	Los Angeles County		
Malott	1	Contra Costa County	94530	
Maltby	1	Contra Costa County		
Mammoth Lakes	1	Mono County	93546	
Manchester	1	Mendocino County	95459	
Manchester-Point Arena Reservation	1	Mendocino County		
Manchester Rancheria	1	Mendocino County	95459	
Manhattan Beach	1	Los Angeles County	90266	
Manila	1	Humboldt County	95521	
Manix	1	San Bernardino County		
Mankas Corner	1	Solano County	94585	
Manlove	1	Sacramento County		
Manolith	1	Kern County		
Manor	1	Marin County	94930	
Manteca	1	San Joaquin County	95336	
Manteca Junction	1	San Joaquin County		
Manton	1	Tehama County	96059	
Manuel	1	Los Angeles County		
Manzana	1	Sonoma County		
Manzanar	1	Inyo County		
Manzanita	1	San Diego County		
Manzanita Indian Reservation	1	San Diego County	92263	
Manzanita Lake	1	Shasta County		
Maple Creek	1	Humboldt County	95550	
Maple Grove	1	Humboldt County		
Maravilla Park	1	Los Angeles County	90022	
Marcelina	1	Los Angeles County	90501	
March	1	Riverside County		
Marchant	1	Sutter County		
March Field	1	Riverside County	92518	
Marconi	1	Marin County		
Marcus Foster	1	Alameda County	94624	
Maredith Mill	1	Sierra County		
Mare Island	1	Solano County	94592	
Mare Island Naval Shipyard	1	Solano County	94592	
Maricopa	1	Kern County	93252	
Marigold	1	San Bernardino County	92373	
Marilyn	1	Inyo County		
Marina	1	Monterey County	93933	
Marina	1	San Francisco County	94123	
Marina del Rey	1	Los Angeles County	90292	
Marina District	1	San Francisco County		
Marin City	1	Marin County	94965	
Marin Country Club Estates	1	Marin County	94949	
Mariner	1	Orange County	90740	
Marinwood	1	Marin County	94903	
Mariposa	1	Mariposa County	95338	
Market	1	Los Angeles County	90021	
Marklee Village	1	Alpine County	96120	
Markleeville	1	Alpine County	96120	
Mark West	1	Sonoma County	95404	
Mark West Springs	1	Sonoma County		
Marlboro	1	Orange County		
Marloma	1	Los Angeles County	90274	
Marne	1	Los Angeles County	91743	
Marshall	1	Marin County	94940	
Marshall Junction	1	Fresno County		
Marshall Station	1	Fresno County	93612	
Marsh Creek Springs	1	Contra Costa County		
Marsh Manor	1	San Mateo County		
Marsh Mill	1	Nevada County		
Martell	1	Amador County	95654	
Martinez	1	Contra Costa County	94553	
Martinez	1	Riverside County		
Martinez	1	Tuolumne County		
Martins	1	Los Angeles County		
Martins Beach	1	San Mateo County	94019	
Mar Vista	1	Los Angeles County	90066	
Marysville	1	Yuba County	95901	
Mason	1	Lassen County		
Mason	1	San Francisco County		
Massack	1	Plumas County	95971	
Matchin	1	Tulare County		
Mather	1	Tuolumne County		
Mather Air Force Base	1	Sacramento County	95655	
Mather Field	1	Sacramento County	95655	
Mather Heights	1	Sacramento County	95655	
Matheson	1	Shasta County		
Mathews Mill	1	Fresno County		
Matilija Springs	1	Ventura County		
Mattei	1	Fresno County		
Maxwell	1	Colusa County	95955	
May	1	Riverside County		
Mayaro	1	Butte County		
Maybury	1	Santa Clara County		
Mayer Farms	1	Riverside County		
Mayfair	1	Los Angeles County		
Mayflower	1	Kern County		
Mayflower Village	1	Los Angeles County	91016	
Mayhew	1	Sacramento County		
Mayo	1	Los Angeles County		
Mayten	1	Siskiyou County		
Maywood	1	Los Angeles County	90270	
M C Log S B Pac	1	San Bernardino County	92311	
Mead	1	Shasta County		
Meadowbrook	1	Riverside County	92570	
Meadowbrook Heights	1	Riverside County		
Meadowbrook Woods	1	San Bernardino County		
Meadow Lake Park	1	Nevada County	95734	
Meadow Lakes	1	Fresno County	93602	
Meadows	1	Sacramento County		
Meadows Field Kern County Air Terminal	1	Kern County	93306	
Meadow Valley	1	Plumas County	95956	
Meadow Vista	1	Placer County	95722	
Mead Valley	1	Riverside County	92570	
Mecca	1	Riverside County	92254	
Mechoopda	1	Amador County		
Medicine Lake Lodge	1	Siskiyou County	96134	
Meeks Bay	1	El Dorado County	96142	
Meiners Oaks	1	Ventura County	93023	
Meiners Oaks-Mira Monte	1	Ventura County		
Melbourne	1	Mendocino County		
Melody Oaks Trailer Park	1	Amador County	95642	
Meloland	1	Imperial County	92243	
Melones	1	Calaveras County	95222	
Melrose	1	Alameda County		
Melsons Corner	1	El Dorado County	95684	
Melvin	1	Fresno County	93612	
Mendocino	1	Mendocino County	95460	
Mendota	1	Fresno County	93640	
Menifee	1	Riverside County	92584	87
Menlo Baths	1	Modoc County		
Menlo Park	1	San Mateo County	94025	
Mentone	1	San Bernardino County	92359	
Merazo	1	Napa County		
Merced	1	Merced County	95340	
Merced Falls	1	Merced County	95369	
Mercey Hot Springs	1	Fresno County		
Mercuryville	1	Sonoma County		
Meridian	1	Colusa County		
Meridian	1	Kern County		
Meridian	1	Santa Clara County		
Meridian	1	Sutter County	95957	
Merlin	1	Plumas County		
Merrill	1	San Bernardino County	92335	
Merrimac	1	Butte County		
Merritt	1	Yolo County		
Merritt-Peck Colonies	1	Fresno County	93654	
Merryman	1	Tulare County		
Mesa	1	Inyo County		
Mesa Camp	1	Mono County		
Mesa Center	1	Orange County	92627	
Mesa Grande	1	San Diego County	92070	
Mesa Grande	1	Sonoma County		
Mesa Grande Indian Reservation	1	San Diego County	92059	
Mesa Oaks	1	Santa Barbara County		
Mesa Oaks	1	Los Angeles County	91724	73
Mesa Verde	1	Riverside County	92225	
Mesaville	1	Riverside County		
Mesa Vista	1	Alpine County		
Mesmer	1	Los Angeles County		
Mesquite Oasis	1	San Diego County		
Mesto	1	Orange County		
Metro	1	Sacramento County	95814	
Metro Main	1	Sacramento County	95801	
Metropolitan	1	Humboldt County	95540	
Metropolitan	1	Los Angeles County	90014	
Mettler	1	Kern County	93381	
Metz	1	Monterey County	93960	
Mexican Colony	1	Kern County	93263	
Meyers	1	El Dorado County		
Meyers	1	San Joaquin County		
Michigan Bluff	1	Placer County	95631	
Michillinda	1	Los Angeles County	91107	
Midas	1	Placer County		
Mid City	1	San Joaquin County	95202	
Midco	1	Santa Barbara County	93455	
Middle Creek	1	Shasta County		
Middlefield Road	1	San Mateo County	94061	
Middle River	1	San Joaquin County	95234	
Middleton	1	Napa County		
Middletown	1	Lake County	95461	
Middletown Rancheria	1	Lake County	95461	
Midlake	1	Lake County	95482	
Midland	1	Riverside County		
Midoil	1	Kern County		
Midpines	1	Mariposa County	95345	
Midtown	1	Butte County	95928	
Midvalley	1	Tulare County		
Midway	1	Alameda County		
Midway	1	Colusa County		
Midway	1	San Bernardino County		
Midway	1	Shasta County		
Midway City	1	Orange County	92655	
Midway Wells	1	Imperial County	92248	
Mikon	1	Yolo County	95605	
Mile High	1	Los Angeles County		
Miles	1	San Luis Obispo County		
Miley	1	Fresno County		
Milford	1	Lassen County	96121	
Millbrae	1	San Mateo County	94030	
Millbrae Meadows	1	San Mateo County	94030	
Mill City	1	Mono County	93533	
Mill Creek	1	Tehama County	96061	
Mill Creek Park	1	San Bernardino County	92359	
Miller Farms	1	Riverside County		
Millers Corners	1	Madera County	93637	
Millersville	1	Kern County		
Millerton	1	Marin County		
Milligan	1	San Bernardino County		
Mills	1	Sacramento County		
Mills	1	San Francisco County	94104	
Millsaps	1	Glenn County		
Mills College	1	Alameda County	94613	
Millsdale	1	San Mateo County	94010	
Mills Orchard	1	Glenn County	95951	
Millspaugh	1	Inyo County		
Millux	1	Kern County		
Mill Valley	1	Marin County	94941	
Millville	1	Shasta County	96062	
Milo	1	Tulare County	93265	
Milpas	1	Santa Barbara County	93108	
Milpitas	1	Santa Clara County	95035	
Milton	1	Calaveras County	95230	
Mina	1	Mendocino County		
Mineral CDP	1	Tehama County	96063	
Mineral King	1	Tulare County	93271	
Minkler	1	Fresno County	93657	
Minneola	1	San Bernardino County		
Minnesota	1	Shasta County		
Minnesota Flat	1	Sierra County		
Mint Canyon	1	Los Angeles County	91350	
Minter Village	1	Kern County		
Minturn	1	Madera County		
Mirabel Heights	1	Sonoma County	95436	
Mirabel Park	1	Sonoma County	95436	
Miracle Hot Springs	1	Kern County	93301	
Miracle Manor	1	Kern County	93501	
Miracle Mile	1	Los Angeles County	90036	
Mirada	1	Los Angeles County	90638	
Mirada Hills	1	Los Angeles County		
Mirador	1	Tulare County		
Miraleste	1	Los Angeles County	90274	
Mira Loma	1	Riverside County	91752	
Miramar	1	San Diego County		
Miramar	1	San Mateo County	94018	
Mira Mesa	1	San Diego County	92126	
Miramonte	1	Fresno County	93641	
Miramonte	1	Los Angeles County		
Mira Monte	1	Ventura County	93023	
Miranda	1	Humboldt County	95553	
Mira Vista	1	Contra Costa County	94805	
Missile View	1	Santa Barbara County	93455	
Mission	1	San Francisco County		
Mission	1	San Luis Obispo County	93401	
Mission	1	Santa Clara County	95051	
Mission Annex	1	San Francisco County	94103	
Mission Beach	1	San Diego County		
Mission Canyon	1	Santa Barbara County		
Mission City Annex	1	Los Angeles County	91345	
Mission District	1	San Francisco County		
Mission Highlands	1	Sonoma County		
Mission Hills	1	Los Angeles County	91345	
Mission Hills	1	San Diego County		
Mission Hills	1	Santa Barbara County	93436	
Mission Junction	1	Los Angeles County		
Mission Rafael	1	Marin County	94901	
Mission San Jose	1	Alameda County	94539	
Mission San Jose District	1	Alameda County		
Mission Soledad	1	Monterey County		
Mission Springs	1	Santa Cruz County	95062	
Mission Viejo	1	Orange County	92690	
Missouri Triangle	1	Kern County		
Mitchell Corner	1	Tulare County	93291	
Mitchell Mill	1	Calaveras County	95257	
Mi-Wuk Village	1	Tuolumne County	95346	
Moccasin	1	Tuolumne County	95347	
Mococo	1	Contra Costa County	94553	
Modesto	1	Stanislaus County	95350	58
Modesto Colony	1	Stanislaus County		
Modesto-Empire Junction	1	Stanislaus County		
Modesto Terminal	1	Stanislaus County		
Modjeska	1	Orange County	92667	
Modjeska Canyon	1	Orange County	92676	
Mofuba	1	Sacramento County		
Mohawk	1	Plumas County		
Mohawk Vista	1	Plumas County		
Mojave	1	Kern County	93501	
Mojave Heights	1	San Bernardino County	92392	
Mokelumne City	1	San Joaquin County		
Mokelumne Hill	1	Calaveras County	95245	
Molena	1	Solano County		
Molino	1	Sonoma County		
Mollison Townhouses	1	San Diego County		
Molus	1	Monterey County		
Monaco	1	Los Angeles County		
Monada	1	San Joaquin County		
Monarch Bay	1	Orange County	92629	
Monarch Beach	1	Orange County	92629	
Mona Vista	1	Tuolumne County	95370	
Moneta	1	Los Angeles County		
Monmouth	1	Fresno County	93725	
Mono Hot Springs	1	Fresno County	93642	
Monolith	1	Kern County	93561	
Mono Mills	1	Mono County		
Mono Village	1	Mono County		
Mono Vista	1	Tuolumne County		
Monroe	1	Sonoma County		
Monrovia	1	Los Angeles County	91016	17
Mons	1	Riverside County		
Monson	1	Tulare County	93618	
Montague	1	Siskiyou County	96064	
Montair	1	Contra Costa County	94526	
Montalvin Manor	1	Contra Costa County	94806	
Montalvo	1	Ventura County	93005	
Montana	1	Los Angeles County	90402	
Montara	1	San Mateo County	94037	
Monta Vista	1	Santa Clara County	95014	
Montclair	1	San Bernardino County	91763	
Montebello	1	Los Angeles County	90640	
Montebello Gardens	1	Los Angeles County	90660	
Montecito	1	Santa Barbara County	93108	
Monte Nido	1	Los Angeles County	91302	
Monterey	1	Monterey County	93940	
Monterey Acres	1	Los Angeles County		
Monterey Bay Academy	1	Santa Cruz County	95076	
Monterey Park	1	Los Angeles County	91754	
Monte Rio	1	Sonoma County	95462	
Monte Rosa	1	Sonoma County		
Montesano	1	Sonoma County	95446	
Monte Sereno	1	Santa Clara County	95030	
Monte Toyon	1	Santa Cruz County	95003	
Monte Vista	1	Placer County		
Monte Vista	1	Santa Clara County	95014	
Montezuma	1	Solano County		
Montgomery	1	Mendocino County		
Montgomery City	1	Mono County		
Montgomery Creek	1	Shasta County	96065	
Montgomery Creek Rancheria	1	Shasta County	96065	
Montgomery Village	1	Sonoma County	95405	
Montpelier	1	Stanislaus County		
Montrose	1	Los Angeles County	91020	
Moody	1	Orange County	90630	
Mooney Flat	1	Nevada County		
Moonridge	1	San Bernardino County	92315	
Moonstone	1	Humboldt County	95570	
Moore	1	San Bernardino County		
Moore	1	Stanislaus County		
Moores Flat	1	Nevada County		
Moorpark	1	Ventura County	93021	
Moorpark Home Acres	1	Ventura County	93021	
Mopeco	1	Kern County		
Morada	1	San Joaquin County	95205	
Moraga	1	Contra Costa County	94556	75
Moraga Town	1	Contra Costa County	94556	75
Mora Villa	1	Santa Barbara County	93104	
Morena	1	San Diego County	92040	
Morena Village	1	San Diego County		
Moreno	1	Riverside County	92555	
Moreno	1	San Diego County		
Moreno Valley	1	Riverside County	92551	57
Morettis Junction	1	San Diego County		
Morgan Hill	1	Santa Clara County	95037	
Morganhill	1	Santa Clara County		
Morgan Springs	1	Tehama County		
Mormon	1	San Joaquin County		
Mormon Bar	1	Mariposa County	95338	
Morningside Park	1	Los Angeles County	90305	
Morongo Indian Reservation	1	Riverside County	92230	
Morongo Valley	1	San Bernardino County	92256	
Morristown	1	Sierra County		
Morro Bay	1	San Luis Obispo County	93442	
Morro Bay	1	San Luis Obispo County		
Morro Palisades	1	San Luis Obispo County	93401	
Morse	1	San Benito County	95045	
Mortero Palms	1	San Diego County		
Mortmar	1	Riverside County		
Moss	1	Imperial County		
Moss Beach	1	San Mateo County	94038	
Mossdale	1	San Joaquin County	95330	
Moss Landing	1	Monterey County		
Moss Landing	1	Monterey County	95039	
Motion	1	Shasta County		
Motor City	1	El Dorado County		
Motor Junction	1	San Bernardino County		
Mott	1	Siskiyou County		
Mounkes	1	Yuba County		
Mountain Center	1	Riverside County	92561	
Mountain Gate	1	Shasta County	96001	
Mountain Home Village	1	San Bernardino County	92359	
Mountain House	1	San Joaquin County	95391	
Mountain Mesa	1	Kern County	93240	
Mountain Pass	1	San Bernardino County	92366	
Mountain Ranch	1	Calaveras County	95246	
Mountain Spring	1	San Diego County	91934	
Mountain View	1	Contra Costa County		
Mountain View	1	Kern County	93307	
Mountain View	1	San Bernardino County		
Mountain View	1	Santa Clara County	94040	43
Mountain View Acres	1	San Bernardino County	92392	
Mount Aukum	1	El Dorado County	95656	
Mount Baldy	2	Los Angeles County	91759	
Mount Baldy	2	San Bernardino County	91759	
Mount Bullion	1	Mariposa County	95338	
Mountclef Village	1	Ventura County		
Mount Eden	1	Alameda County	94557	
Mount Eden Station	1	Alameda County		
Mount Hamilton	1	Santa Clara County	95140	
Mount Hannah Lodge	1	Lake County		
Mount Hebron	1	Siskiyou County	96066	
Mount Helix	1	San Diego County	91941	
Mount Hermon	1	Santa Cruz County	95041	
Mount Jackson	1	Sonoma County		
Mount Laguna	1	San Diego County	91948	
Mount San Antonio	1	Los Angeles County	91789	
Mount Shasta	1	Siskiyou County	96067	
Mount Signal	1	Imperial County	92231	
Mount View	1	Contra Costa County	94553	
Mount Washington	1	Los Angeles County		
Mount Wilson	1	Los Angeles County	91023	
Mugginsville	1	Siskiyou County	96032	
Muir	1	Contra Costa County		
Muir	1	Mendocino County	95490	
Muir Beach	1	Marin County	94965	
Muir Woods National Monument	1	Marin County	94941	
Mulberry	1	Butte County		
Mulford	1	Alameda County		
Mulford Gardens	1	Alameda County		
Mundo	1	Imperial County		
Munyon	1	Imperial County		
Murietta Farm	1	Fresno County		
Muroc	1	Kern County		
Murphys	1	Calaveras County	95247	
Murray Park	1	Marin County	94939	
Murrieta	1	Riverside County	92562	64
Murrieta Hot Springs	1	Riverside County	92563	
Muscat	1	San Bernardino County		
Muscatel	1	Fresno County		
Muscoy	1	San Bernardino County	92405	
Myers Flat	1	Humboldt County	95554	
Myoma	1	Riverside County		
Myricks Corner	1	Kern County		
Myrtletown	1	Humboldt County	95501	
Mystic	1	Nevada County		
