= Mint =

Mint or The Mint may refer to:

== Plants ==
- Lamiaceae, the mint family
  - Mentha, the genus of plants commonly known as "mint"

== Coins and collectibles ==
- Mint (facility), for manufacturing coins
- Mint condition, a state of like-new quality

== Arts and entertainment ==
=== Fictional entities ===
- Mint, in the video game Threads of Fate
- Mr. Mint, a character in the board game series Candy Land
- Mint, a Ranma ½ character
- Mint Adnade, in the video game Tales of Phantasia
- Mint Aizawa, in the anime and manga Tokyo Mew Mew
- Mint Blancmanche, in the video game/anime series Galaxy Angel
- Mint Fantôme, independent VTuber

=== Film and television ===
- Mint (film), a Japanese drama
- The Mint (film), a 2015 American comedy
- The Mint (Australian game show), 2007–2008
- The Mint (British game show), 2006–2007
- Mint (TV series), British crime drama series, 2026

=== Music ===
- Mint (band), a Belgian music group
- Mint (singer) (born 1994), a Thai singer based in South Korea
- Mint Records, a record label
- Mint (Alice Merton album), 2019
- Mint, a 1983 album by Meiko Nakahara
- Mint, a 2003 album by Alexkid in collaboration with Liset Alea
- "Mint" (Namie Amuro song), 2016
- "Mint" (Rina Aiuchi song), 2007
- "Mint" (Lindsay Ell song), 2017
- "Mint" (Misako Uno song), 2019
- "The Mint", a song by Earl Sweatshirt from the 2018 album Some Rap Songs

=== Literature ===
- Mint (newspaper), a business newspaper published in India
- The Mint (book), by T. E. Lawrence, 1955

== Businesses, organisations and products ==
- Mint (restaurant), in Dublin, Ireland
- Intuit Mint, formerly Mint.com, a personal financial management website and mobile app
- Malaysian Institute of Nuclear Technology Research, now Malaysian Nuclear Agency
- Minor International, a hospitality company, Stock Exchange of Thailand symbol MINT
- Mint Airways, a former Spanish airline
- MiNT camera, a company specializing in instant cameras and accessories
- Mint Mobile, a mobile virtual network operator in the US
- Mint Productions, an Irish TV production company
- The Mint Las Vegas, a hotel and casino in Las Vegas 1957–1989
- JetBlue Mint, a premium cabin service of JetBlue
- Mint, a robot by Evolution Robotics
- Ministry of Innovation and Technology (Ethiopia)

== Computing ==
- Mint (web analytics software), discontinued 2016
- MiNT, an operating system for the Atari ST
- Linux Mint, a distribution of the Linux kernel

== Places ==
- Mint, Arizona, U.S.
- Liberty of the Mint, or The Mint, a district in Southwark, London, England
- River Mint, in Cumbria, England
- Mint River, in Alaska, U.S.
- The Mint (Carlingford), a fortified house and museum in Ireland
- Sydney Mint, in New South Wales, Australia
- Vallalar Nagar, Chennai, India, popularly called Mint

== Other uses ==
- Mint (candy), a food item flavoured with mint
- MINT (economics), the economies of Mexico, Indonesia, Nigeria, and Turkey
- MINT, another acronym used for Science, technology, engineering, and mathematics (STEM)
- Mint, a shade of the colour spring green

== See also ==
- Mint Street (disambiguation)
- Minter (disambiguation)
- Minto (disambiguation)
- Minton (disambiguation)
- Minty (disambiguation)
- Mintz, a surname
- Spearmint (disambiguation)
- Peppermint (disambiguation)
