= Mulford =

Mulford may refer to:

== Surname ==
- Mulford (surname)

== Given name ==
- Charles Mulford Robinson (1869–1917), American journalist and writer
- Mulford B. Foster (1888–1978), American botanist
- Fanny Rysan Mulford Hitchcock (1851–1936), American chemist
- Harriet Mulford Lothrop (1844–1924), American author aka Margaret Sidney
- Charles Mulford Robinson (1869–1917), American journalist and urban planning theorist
- Mulford Q. Sibley (1912–1989), American professor of political science
- Henry Mulford Tichenor (1858–1922), writer and magazine editor
- Daniel Mulford Valentine (1830–1907), justice of the Kansas Supreme Court
- Mulford Winsor (1874–1956), American newspaperman

== Places ==
- Mulford, San Leandro, California, a neighborhood in San Leandro, Alameda County, California
- Mulford Farmhouse, an English colonial farmstead in East Hampton, Long Island, New York
- Mulford Gardens, San Leandro, California, a neighborhood in San Leandro, Alameda County, California
- Mulford Landing, San Leandro, California, a neighborhood in San Leandro, Alameda County, California
- Mulford, Colorado
- Terry-Mulford House, historic home located at Orient in Suffolk County, New York

== Other ==
- Mulford Act, a 1967 California bill prohibiting the public carrying of loaded firearms
- Mulford Building, a light manufacturing loft in Philadelphia
- Mulford Creek (Cape Fear River tributary) in North Carolina
- Mulford Expedition, scientific expedition to the Amazon conducted in 1921
- Mulfords Run, a stream in Ohio
- H. K. Mulford Company, pharmaceutical company from Philadelphia, Pennsylvania
