= National Night =

Commercial by Perfetti Van Melle to encourage childbirth

National Night is a commercial by Perfetti Van Melle, the makers of Mentos to encourage procreation on the night of National Day of Singapore in 2012 to express patriotism.
