= Marshall station =

Marshall station may refer to:

- Marshall railway station in Geelong, Victoria
- Marshall Station, California, an abandoned settlement in Fresno County, California
- Marshall station (Missouri), also known as Chicago and Alton Depot or Illinois Central Gulf Depot, a historic train station
- Marshall station (Texas), a railroad station in Marshall, Texas
