= Minty =

Minty may refer to:

- relating to the mint plant Mentha
  - Spearmint (flavour)
- Minty (band), a band founded by Leigh Bowery in 1993
- Minty (TV series), a 1998 Australian–British comedy series
- Minty, Poland, a village
- Emil Minty (born 1972), former actor
- Minty Peterson, a fictional character in the British TV series EastEnders

== See also ==
- Mint (disambiguation)
- Minties, a brand of confectionery
