= Melvin (disambiguation) =

Melvin is a given name and surname. It may also refer to:

== Places ==
=== United States ===
- Melvin, Alabama, an unincorporated community
- Melvin, California, a former unincorporated community
- Melvin, Illinois, a village
- Melvin, Iowa, a city
- Melvin, Kentucky, an unincorporated community
- Melvin, Michigan, a village
- Melvin Village, New Hampshire, a village and census-designated place
- Melvin, Ohio, an unincorporated community
- Melvin, South Dakota, a ghost town
- Melvin, Texas, a town
- Melvin River, New Hampshire

=== Elsewhere ===
- Lough Melvin, a lake on the border between the Republic of Ireland and Great Britain

== Other uses ==
- USS Melvin (DD-335), a United States Navy destroyer
- USS Melvin (DD-680), a United States Navy destroyer
- Melvins, an American rock band
  - Melvins! (album) (1986)
- Melvin Capital, an American investment management firm
- "Two Guys Naked in a Hot Tub", an episode of South Park also known as "Melvins"
- The "Melvin", the national Scoutcraft Competition of Scouting Ireland (CSI)
- A "melvin," a frontal variation of a wedgie.
