= Mamix =

Russian vlogger (born 1996)

- Born: Maxim Alexandrovich Monakhov
- Other name: Mamix
- Occupation: YouTuber

YouTube information
- Channels: Mamix 2; Mamix Live; It's Mamix
- Years active: 2013–present
- Genres: pop-science experiments; DIY
- Subscribers: 3.75 million (Mamix 2); 8.08 million (Mamix Live); 15.6 million (It's Mamix)
- Views: 146 million (Mamix 2); 0 (Mamix Live); 2.94 billion (It's Mamix)
- Last updated: December 2025

Maxim Alexandrovich Monahov (Russian: Максим Александрович Монахов), better known as Mamix (Russian: Мамикс), is a Russian YouTuber. He publishes various DIY and experiment videos on his YouTube channels.

Repeated winner of silver and gold YouTube Play Buttons for achieving a level of one hundred thousand and a million subscribers. In 2020, one of his YouTube channels reached 10 million subscribers, making him also an owner of diamond creator award.

== Early life and YouTube activity ==
In 2016, Monahov began to publish pop-science experiments and DIY videos. He first got popularity after the publication of the experiment where he mixed 10 thousand liters of Coca-Cola with Mentos (actually soda was used instead).

In 2020, he repeated the experiment with 10 thousand liters of Coca-Cola and soda.

On December 27, 2021, an explosion occurred during the filming of the video. As a results Mamix suffered a serious injury to his arm and was in a coma. In an audio recording published on March 3, 2022, he is heard counting down, but when he says "Let's go!" nothing happens. Seconds later, a loud explosion happens, and Mamix's team shouts to call an ambulance. Mamix said he received about 13 fractures and burns.

== Awards ==
Year	Ceremony	Category	Result	Refs
2016	Vidfest	«Like 2016»: «Like for breakthrough»	Won	
