= Mayaro =

Mayaro may refer to:

- Mayaro, California, an unincorporated community in Butte County, California, U.S.
- Mayaro Bay, a bay on the east coast of the island of Trinidad
- Mayaro County, a group of villages in Trinidad and Tobago
  - Mayaro, Trinidad, a town in Mayaro County
- Mayaro virus, a virus transmitted by the Haemagogus mosquito
