= Morgan Hill Unified School District =

Public school district in the United States

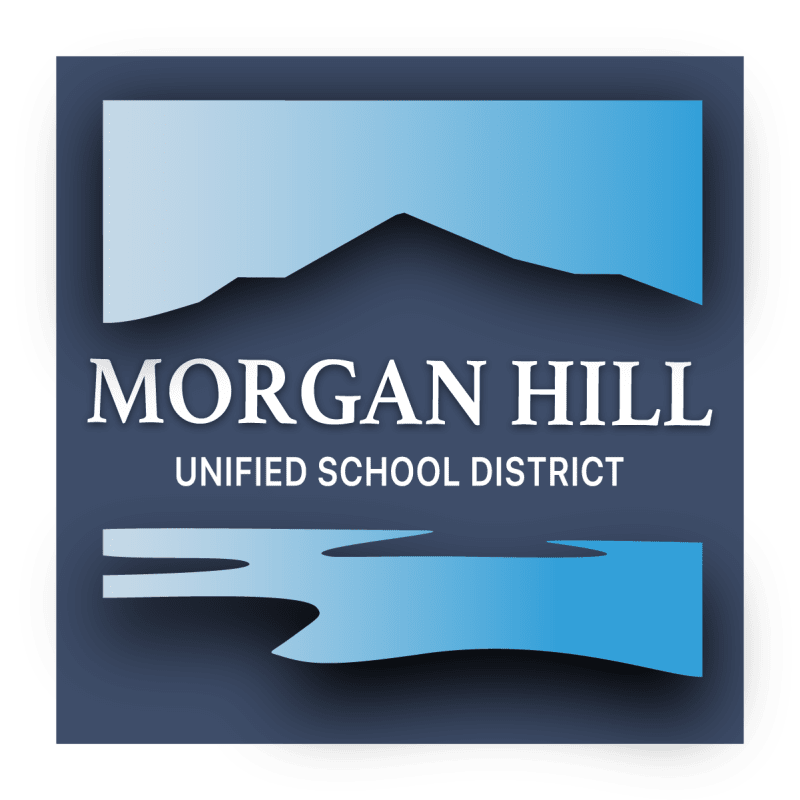

Address
- 15600 Concord Circle Morgan Hill, California, 95037; United States
- Coordinates: 37.111683°N 121.634604°W

District information
- Grades: K-12
- Established: 1903; 123 years ago
- Superintendent: Carmen Garcia
- NCES District ID: 0626280

Students and staff
- Students: 4,753 (2020–2021)
- Teachers: 240.14 (FTE)
- Staff: 276.01 (FTE)
- Student–teacher ratio: 19.79:1

Other information
- Website: www.mhusd.org

The Morgan Hill Unified School District (MHUSD) is a public school district operating eight elementary schools, two middle schools, and three high schools in southern Santa Clara County, California. Its jurisdiction covers all of Morgan Hill, California, and San Martin, California, as well as Coyote Valley and the Santa Teresa district of San Jose, California. Alongside its traditional schools, MHUSD, in special partnership with The Tech Interactive and Stanford University, operates four specialized public "focus academies", in STEAM, mathematics and music, engineering, and health sciences. MHUSD schools have been awarded as National Blue Ribbon Schools, California Distinguished Schools, and California Gold Ribbon Schools.

== History ==
Live Oak Union High School was established in 1903. At the organization of Live Oak Union, previously existing rural school districts Highland, Burnett, San Martin, Machado, and Morgan Hill were included, and, in August 1921, Coyote, Llagas and Uvas districts were added to what eventually became Morgan Hill Unified School District.

In September 2004, Ann Sobrato High School was opened to grades 9 through 10. By August 2006, the school was fully staffed and supported grades 9 through 12. The 120-acre (49 ha) tract for the school was donated by the Sobrato family, in honor of Ann Sobrato.

== Administration ==
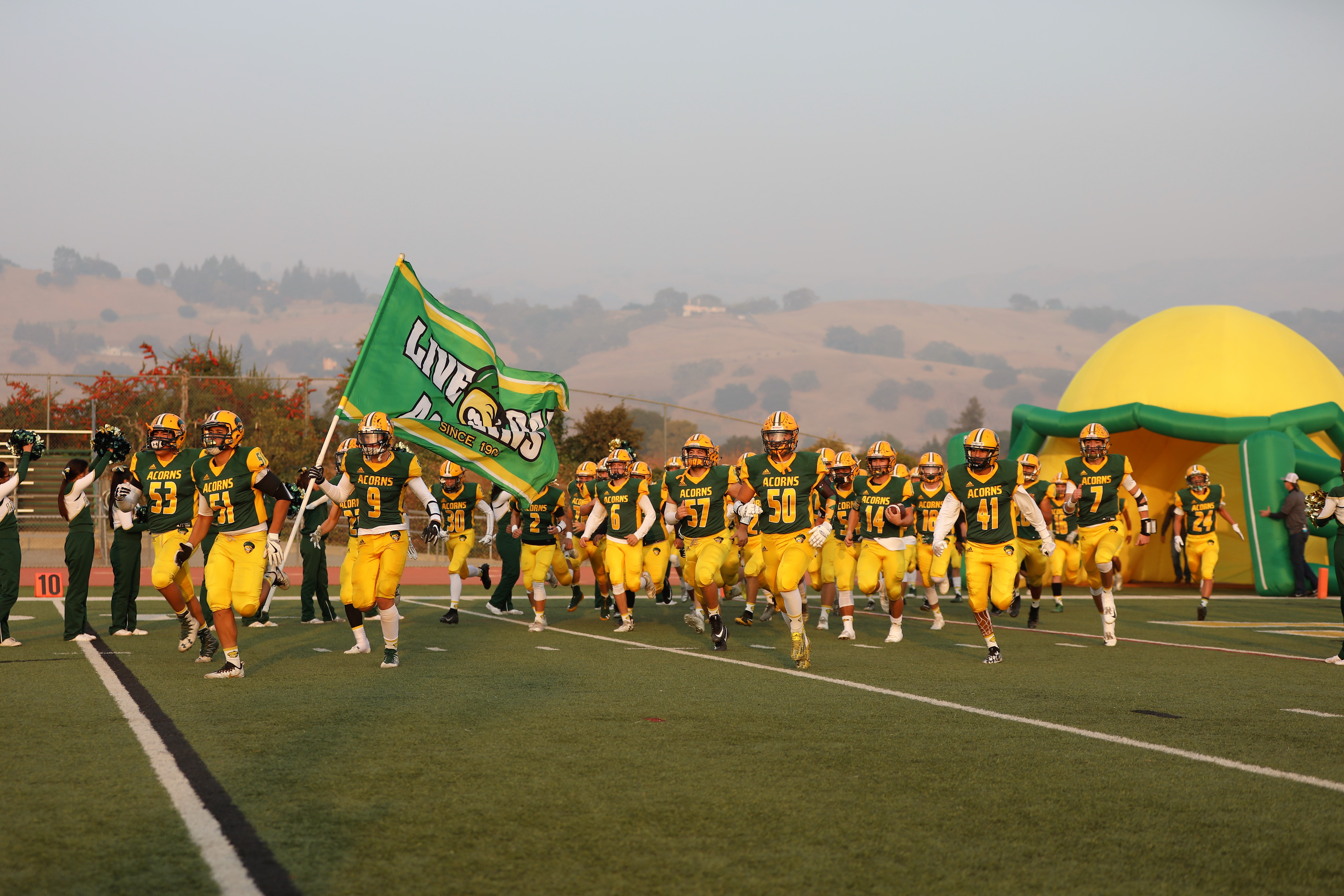
The Live Oak High School Acorns.

The district has 400 Full-Time Equivalent (FTE) teachers, serving 8809 students, across 14 schools. The district is governed by a publicly elected seven-member Board of Education, while management is entrusted to the Superintendent, who is selected by the Board.

The district's jurisdiction area covers 296 square miles (767 square kilometers) in southern Santa Clara County, stretching all of Morgan Hill, California, all of San Martin, California, all of unincorporated Coyote Valley, and the Santa Teresa district of San Jose, California.

== Academics ==
=== Focus Academies ===
Alongside its traditional schools, MHUSD, in special partnership with The Tech Interactive (formerly the Tech Museum of Innovation), a Silicon Valley institution, operates 5 specialized public "focus academies", through its Tech Academies Initiative: Focus Academies provides the opportunity for students to specialize their studies within broad fields (engineering, STEAM, maths, music, health sciences), allowing for in-depth learning in subjects within programs designed by noted subject matter experts, including scientists from The Tech Museum of Innovation and Stanford University medical professors.

- Paradise Valley Engineering Academy
- P.A. Walsh STEAM Academy — run in partnership with The Tech Museum of Innovation
- Jackson Academy of Math & Music
- El Toro Health Science Academy — first elementary-level health sciences program in California; created in partnership with Stanford University
- San Martin/Gwinn Environmental Science Academy

=== Awards and rankings ===
MHUSD schools were awarded as California Distinguished Schools in 1989, 1993, 1995, 1997, 2004, and 2012.

Jackson was awarded as a National Blue Ribbon School in 1999.

Four schools in the district were awarded as California Gold Ribbon Schools in 2015, including Sobrato and Live Oak, which were also awarded as California Exemplary Programs in 2015.

== Schools ==
Schools highlighted in pale green are MHUSD Focus Academies.

=== Elementary schools ===
School Facts
School name	Location	Students	FTE Teachers	Pupil/Teacher Ratio	Grades	Notes	Web site
Barrett Elementary School	Morgan Hill	485	26	18.7	K-5		
El Toro Health Science Academy	Morgan Hill	572	25.6	22.3	K-5	MHUSD Focus Academy; The first elementary-level health sciences program in California. Program created in partnership with Stanford University and The Tech Interactive.	
Jackson Academy of Math & Music	Morgan Hill	547	26	21	K-8	MHUSD Focus Academy; Designated as California Distinguished School in 1997.	
Los Paseos Elementary School	Santa Teresa, San Jose	403	20	20.2	K-5		
Nordstrom Elementary School	Morgan Hill	633	29	21.8	K-5	Designated as California Distinguished School in 1995, reconfirmed in 2004.	
P.A. Walsh STEAM Academy	Morgan Hill	434	22	19.7	K-5	MHUSD Focus Academy; Program created in partnership with The Tech Interactive. Designated as National Blue Ribbon School in 1999. Designated as California Distinguished School in 1993.	
Paradise Valley Engineering Academy	Morgan Hill	521	25	20.8	K-5	MHUSD Focus Academy	
San Martin/Gwinn Environmental Science Academy	San Martin	564	27.8	30.3	K-8	MHUSD Focus Academy	

=== Charter schools ===
School Facts
School name	Location	Students	FTE Teachers	Pupil/Teacher Ratio	Grades	Notes	Web site
Charter School of Morgan Hill	Madrone, Morgan Hill	475	13.2 (?)	21.8 (?)	K-8	Charter established in 2001 and renewed in 2006, 2011, and 2016. Designated as California Distinguished School in 2012.	

=== Middle schools ===
School Facts
School name	Location	Students	FTE Teachers	Pupil/Teacher Ratio	Grades	Notes	Web site
Lewis H. Britton Middle School	Morgan Hill	1189	47.3	25.1	6-8	Partnership with The Tech Interactive in the Math, Engineering, & Science Achievement (MESA). Designated as California Gold Ribbon School in 2015.	
Martin Murphy Middle School	Santa Teresa, San Jose	831	34.6	24	6-8	Named after Martín Murphy, a Californio pioneer of Morgan Hill, San Martin, and Gilroy. Designated as California Gold Ribbon School in 2015.	

=== High schools ===
School Facts
School name	Location	Students	FTE Teachers	Pupil/Teacher Ratio	Grades	Note	Web site
Ann Sobrato High School	Madrone, Morgan Hill	1,538	65	23.7	9-12	Ranked in top 100 best public schools in California Named for Ann Sobrato, Bay Area real estate tycoon and matriarch of the Sobrato Organization. Designated as California Gold Ribbon School in 2015.	
Live Oak High School	Morgan Hill	1,168	74.9	23	9-12	Established in 1904 as Live Oak Union High School. Designated as California Gold Ribbon School in 2015.	
Central High School	Madrone, Morgan Hill	160	6	26.7	10-12		
