= Mint condition =

High-quality status of a good despite previous ownership

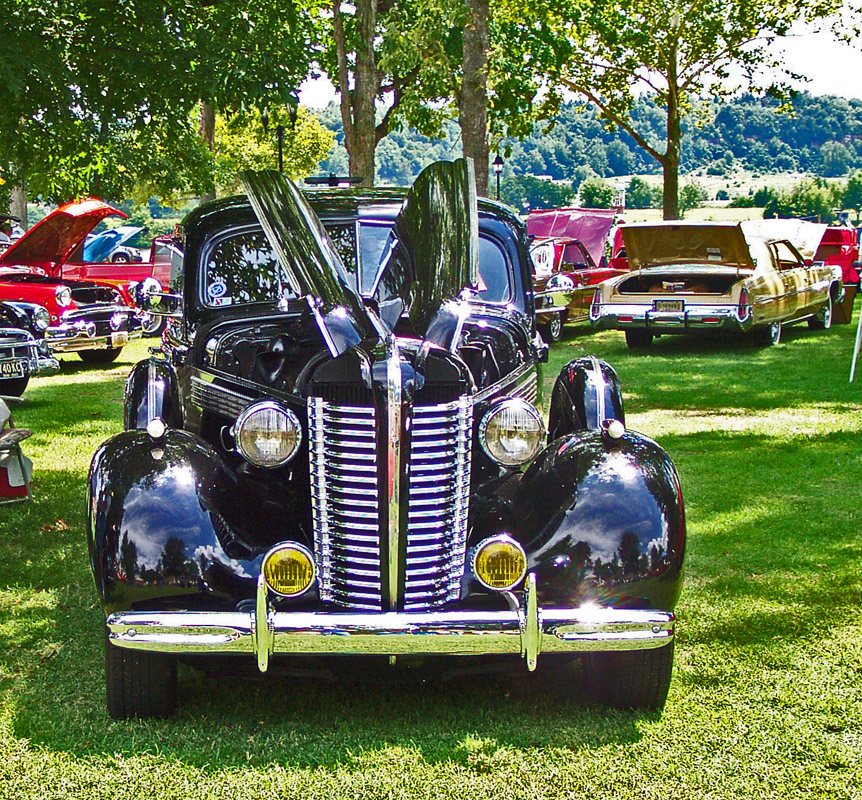
Vintage cars in optimal states of repair may be described as being in mint condition.

Mint condition is an expression used to denote the quality of a pre-owned good as displaying virtually no imperfections and being in pristine condition relative to its original production state. Originally, the phrase related to the way collectors described the condition of coins. As the name given to a coin factory is a "mint", then mint condition is the condition a coin is in when it leaves the mint.

== Variations ==
The term mint condition may be used to describe a variety of collectible items, including action figures, dolls, toys, stamps, records, comic books, video games, coins and similar items. The term may have a slightly different meaning in each case. For instance, when describing trading cards, "perfect" condition is used to describe the condition as it is when pulled from a pack, while "mint" would be new but opened. Similar gradations of mint condition exist for other collectibles based on their specific characteristics. For example, a postage stamp may be mint or mint never hinged.

Abbreviations include:

- MIB: Mint In Box
- MIP: Mint In Package
- MISB: Mint In Sealed Box
- MOC: Mint On Card (for accessories sold attached to a card)
- NRFB: Never Removed From Box

== See also ==
- The dictionary definition of mint condition at Wiktionary
- Mint (disambiguation)
- New old stock
- Sheldon coin grading scale, including "Mint State"
