= Spearmint (disambiguation) =

Spearmint is a plant used as a flavouring in food and herbal teas.

Spearmint may also refer to:

- Spearmint (flavour), either naturally or artificially created
- Wrigley's Spearmint, a brand of chewing gum
- Spearmint (band), a British indie band
- Spearmint (horse), a racehorse
- Spearmint Spire, aka Spearmint, a mountain in Alaska

== See also ==
- Spearmint Rhino, a chain of Gentlemen's clubs
