= Minter =

Minter may refer to:

== Places in the United States ==
- Minter, Alabama, an unincorporated community
- Minter Village, California, an unincorporated community
- Minter City, Mississippi

== Other uses ==
- Minter (surname)
