= Live Oak High School (Morgan Hill, California) =

High school in Morgan Hill, California

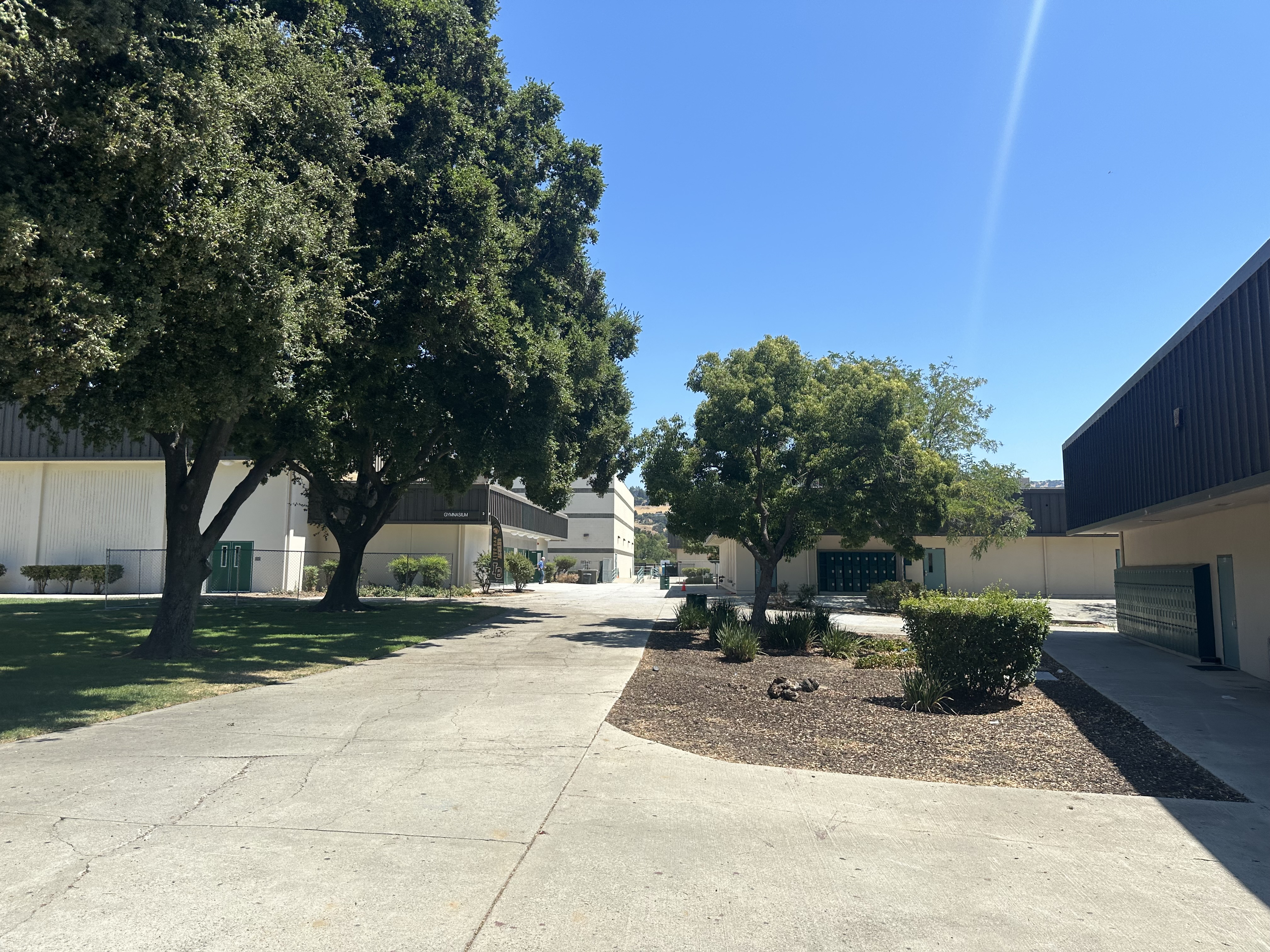
- Part of the school's campus in July 2024

Location
- 1505 East Main Ave. Morgan Hill, California; United States; 37°08′52″N 121°38′08″W

Information
- Type: Public
- Established: 1904
- School district: Morgan Hill Unified School District
- Principal: Tanya Calabretta
- Staff: 55.92 (FTE)
- Grades: 9–12
- Student to teacher ratio: 19.87
- Colors: Forest Green and Harvest Gold
- Slogan: Go Nuts!
- Mascot: Acorn
- Newspaper: The Oak Leaf
- Website: liveoak.mhusd.org

Live Oak High School (LOHS) is a public high school in Morgan Hill, California. Designated as a California Gold Ribbon School in 2015, Live Oak is part of the Morgan Hill Unified School District.

== History ==
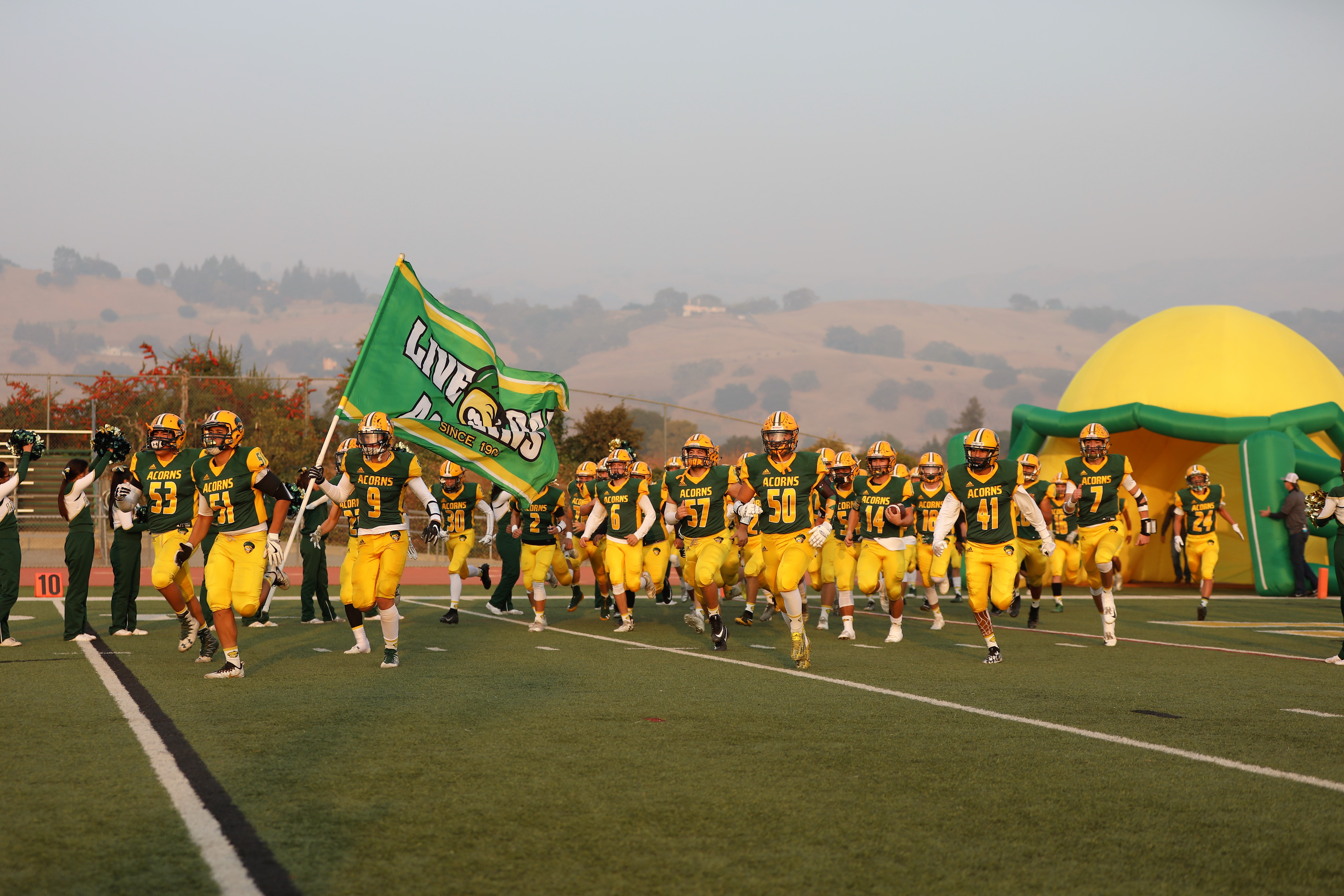
The Live Oak Acorns

Live Oak Union High School was established in 1904. Montgomery Hall was used to house the pupils for the first term. Construction of the first permanent facilities were completed in 1905. At the organization of Live Oak Union, Highland, Burnett, San Martin, Machado and Morgan Hill rural school districts were included, and, in August, 1921, Coyote, Llagas and Uvas districts were added.

In 1940, a new campus was built on the north side of town, along Monterey Street, between West Central Avenue and Keystone Avenue. The main entrance was at 80 West Central Avenue.

The school was moved from West Central Avenue to its present location at 1505 East Main Avenue in the summer of 1975. The former campus on West Central Avenue was renamed and established as Lewis H. Britton Middle School. Due to the establishment of Britton Middle School, from 1979 Live Oak High School consisted only of grades 10 through 12, but as of the autumn of 2004, it once again functions as a four-year high school.

=== Cinco de Mayo incident ===
On May 5, 2010, five LOHS students arrived at school wearing T-shirts and bandanas bearing emblems of the American flag. The school's administrators sent home four of them for refusing to remove the T-shirts on the Pueblan holiday of Cinco de Mayo. School officials deemed the garments "incendiary" and "disrespectful," fearing that displaying the American flag would incite fights with the Mexican-American student body. The four students were told they could choose to change their clothes or go home for the day.

On May 6, approximately 200 Hispanic teens, most of whom were Live Oak High School students, walked out of their classes and marched through the downtown and to city hall in protest of what they regarded as disrespect from their American-flag-wearing peers. The crowd carried Mexican flags and sported the red, white and green of Mexico's national emblem. Two days later, a crowd of students led by several Hispanic students gathered in the amphitheater and held an anti-racism rally advocating acceptance and tolerance among the students.

On May 10, the ACLU of Northern California sent a letter to the Morgan Hill Schools Superintendent protesting that the students' First Amendment rights had been violated and asking that the School District "take additional steps to inform students that their rights to free speech will be respected in the future".

On November 8, 2011, United States District Court for the Northern District of California Chief Judge W. James Ware of San Francisco dismissed the students' lawsuit. While public school students have the right to engage in non-disruptive free speech, Chief Judge Ware found this "does not require that school officials wait until disruption occurs before they act". The United States Court of Appeals for the Ninth Circuit in San Francisco affirmed the district court's ruling. The student’s final appeal to the United States Supreme Court was denied without comment.

== Awards and rankings ==
Live Oak was designated as a California Gold Ribbon School in 2015.

== Notable alumni ==
- Jared Allen, NFL Hall of Fame football player, attended Live Oak for two years (kicked out for selling stolen year books)
- Ricky Berry, professional basketball player
- Hal Davis (Class of 1938), sprinter
- Rhett Hall, NFL football player
- James Hibbard, professional road and track cyclist
- Ryan Neufeld (Class of 1994), NFL football player
- Rey Sánchez, baseball player and exchange student from Puerto Rico to Live Oak High
- Bob Stoddard, baseball player
- Jeff Ulbrich (Class of 1995), NFL linebacker
- Jimmy Vasser (Class of 1983), racecar driver
