= Malibu Vista, California =

Unincorporated community in California, United States

- Unincorporated community
- Location within California Location within the United States
- Coordinates: 34°02′52″N 118°46′27″W
- Country: United States
- State: California
- County: Los Angeles
- Elevation: 994 ft (303 m)
- Time zone: UTC-8 (Pacific (PST))
  - Summer (DST): UTC-7 (PDT)
- Area code: 818
- GNIS feature ID: 1660981

Malibu Vista is an unincorporated community in Los Angeles County, California, United States. Malibu Vista is located in the Santa Monica Mountains, 1.6 miles (2.6 km) north of the Pacific Ocean at Malibu. Malibu Vista, one of a handful of residential tracts in the Malibu–Topanga hills, is the one relatively closest to Point Dume, and is in the same canyon as Malibu Mar Vista (but closer to the beach).
