= Mint (film) =

- Directed by: Eiki Taminato
- Screenplay by: Eiki Taminato
- Starring: Fumiko Tomatsu; Shinichi Taminato
- Edited by: Eiki Taminato
- Release dates: November 2014 (1st New Directors Film Festival, Japan)
- Running time: 119 minutes
- Country: Japan
- Language: Japanese

Mint (Japanese: ミント) is a 2014 Japanese film directed by Eiki Taminato and screened at the 1st New Directors Film Festival the same year.

== Cast ==
- Fumiko Tomatsu as Miki Kusano
- Shinichi Taminato as Mitsuru Izumikawa
- Shinjirô Takahashi as Chief Editor Joji
- Daiju Matsuo as Forest Man
- Maia Umetani as Shizuka Izumikawa
