= Mint Street =

Mint Street may refer to:

- Mint Street, Chennai, India
- Mint Street, London, England, a remnant of the Liberty of the Mint
- Reserve Bank of India, often known as Mint Street
- Mint Street station, in Charlotte, North Carolina, U.S.
