= Mulford Gardens, San Leandro, California =

Coordinates: 37°42′17″N 122°10′47″W

Mulford Gardens is a neighborhood in San Leandro in Alameda County, California. It lies at an elevation of 20 feet (6 m). It was formerly an unincorporated community. It is between Mulford and Mulford Landing.
