= Madrone, Morgan Hill, California =

Madrone
- Neighborhood of Morgan Hill
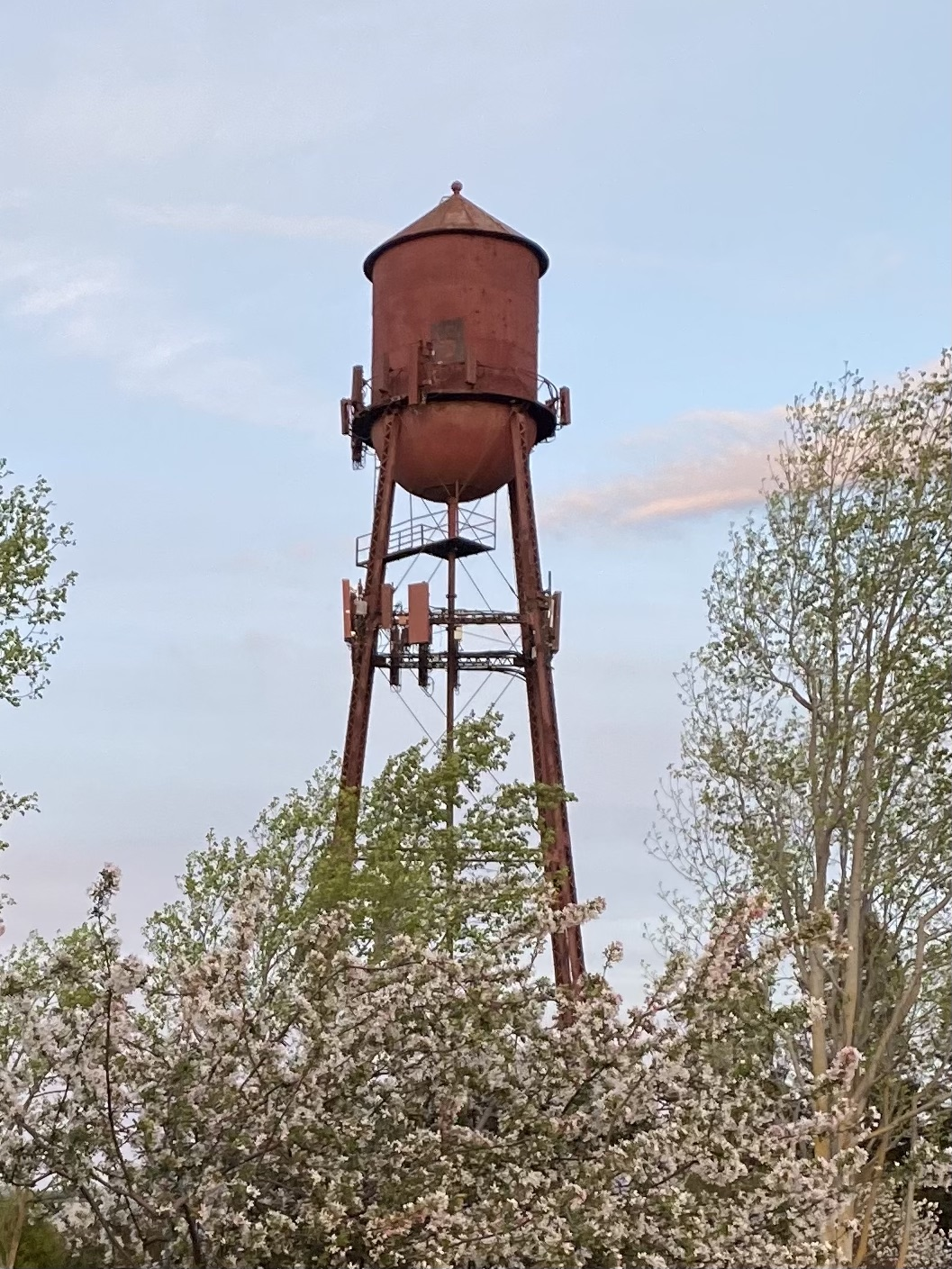
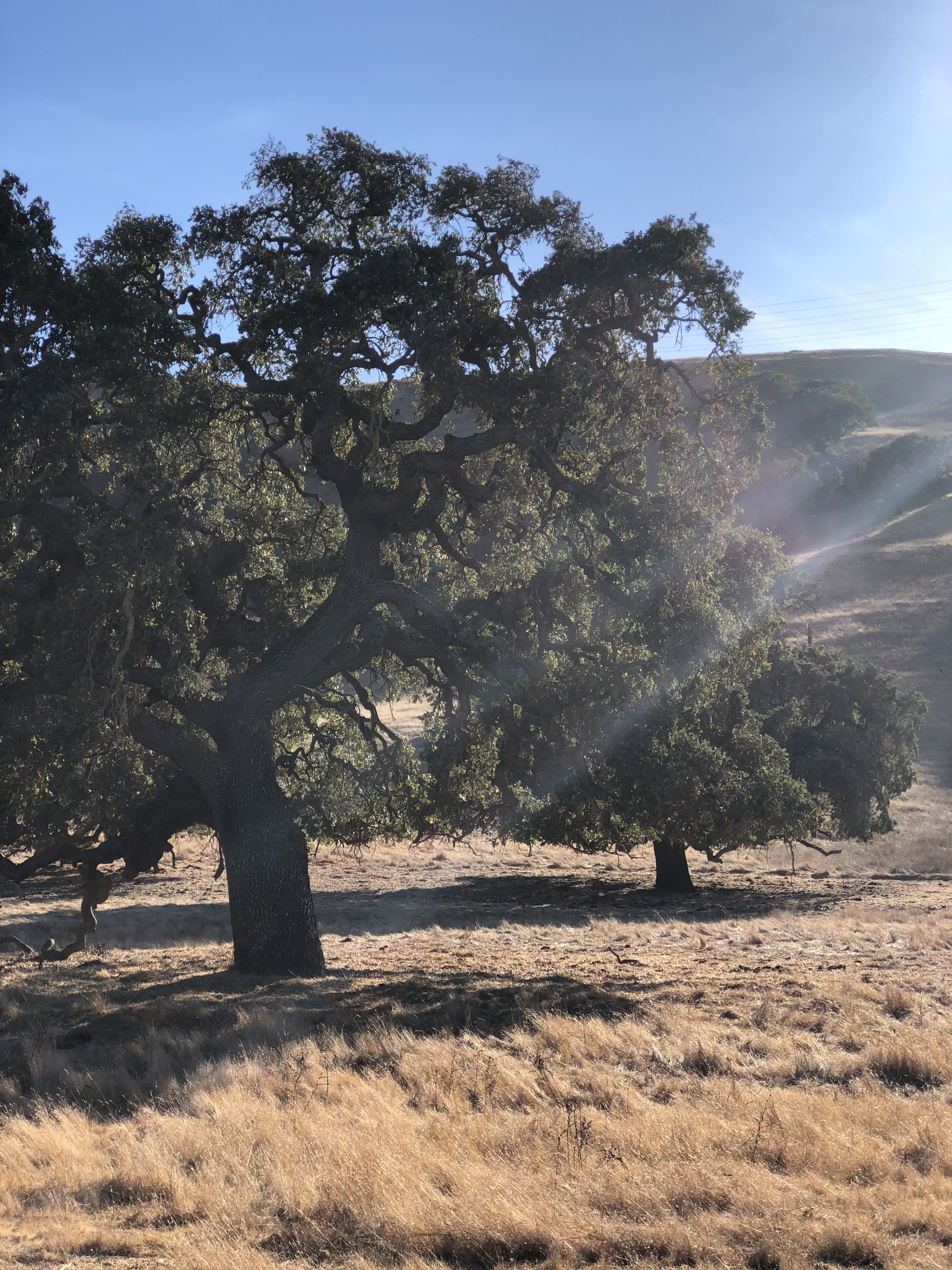
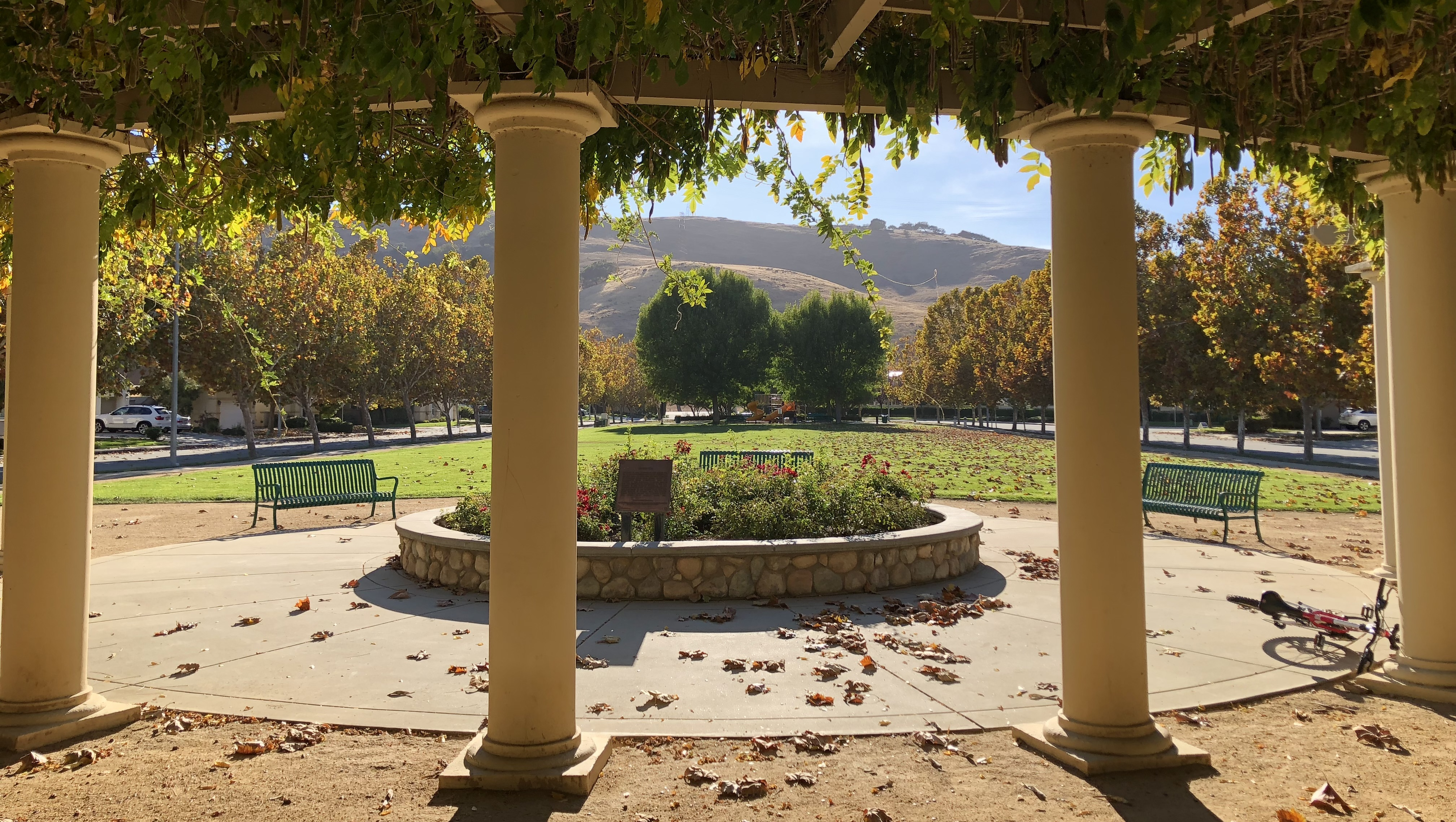
- Clockwise: Madrone Water Tower, Madrone Hills, Madrone Historical Landmark at Capriano Park.

- Location in California
- Coordinates: 37.154493°N 121.675701°W
- Country: United States
- State: California
- County: Santa Clara
- City: Morgan Hill

Madrone is a neighborhood of Morgan Hill, California, located at the base of the Santa Cruz Mountains. Once an independent town within Santa Clara County, the City of Morgan Hill annexed the Town of Madrone in 1959, turning the town into Morgan Hill's northern district, bordering San Jose, California. Today, Madrone is primarily an affluent residential area, home to numerous luxury developments and landed estates.

With median home price of $1,422,346, Madrone is among the most expensive neighborhoods in United States, well above the national average of $220,100.

== History ==
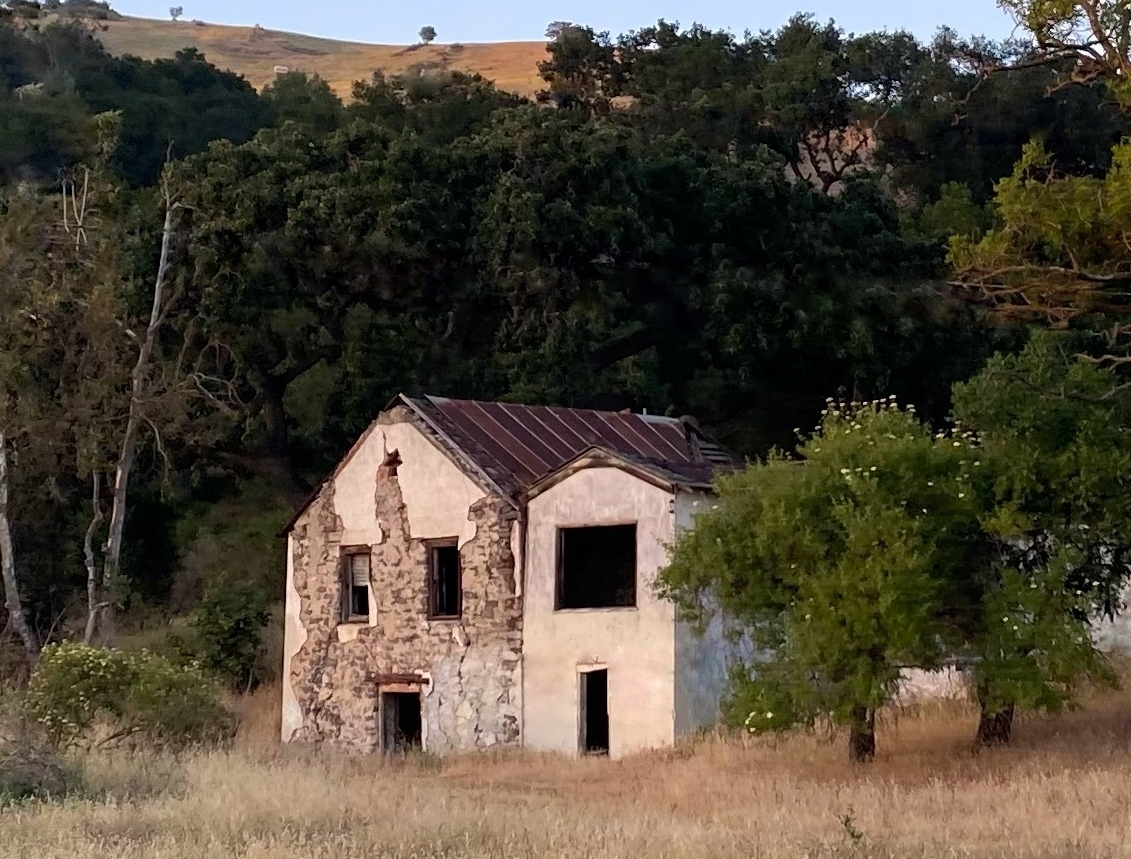
The Malaguerra Winery in Madrone, built in 1869 by José María Malaguerra, is a National Historic Landmark.

The area now known as Madrone had long been known as a popular campsite for Spanish colonists traveling between Monterey and San Jose. However, Madrone was first permanently settled in 1835, during the period of Mexican rule in California, by Juan María Hernández, who was granted the Rancho Refugio de la Laguna Seca. In 1845, the rancho came into the hands of Captain William Fisher, the first American citizen to own land in the area.

Soon after the 1850 American Conquest of California, the area was organized as the Burnett Township in 1852, named after Peter Hardeman Burnett, the first American Governor of California and local resident. By 1882, settlement came to be known as Madrone, after the Pacific Madrone, with the popularity of the local Madrone Mineral Springs.

The City of Morgan Hill annexed the Town of Madrone in 1959, rendering Madrone as a historic neighborhood of Morgan Hill.

== Communities ==
Within Madrone, there are numerous distinct communities, including:

- Amadora
- Capriano
- Madrone Plaza
- Stonebridge
- Willow Springs Canyon
- Mission Ranch
- Alicante
- Borello Ranch Estates
- Coyote Estates
- Vista de Lomas

== Economy ==
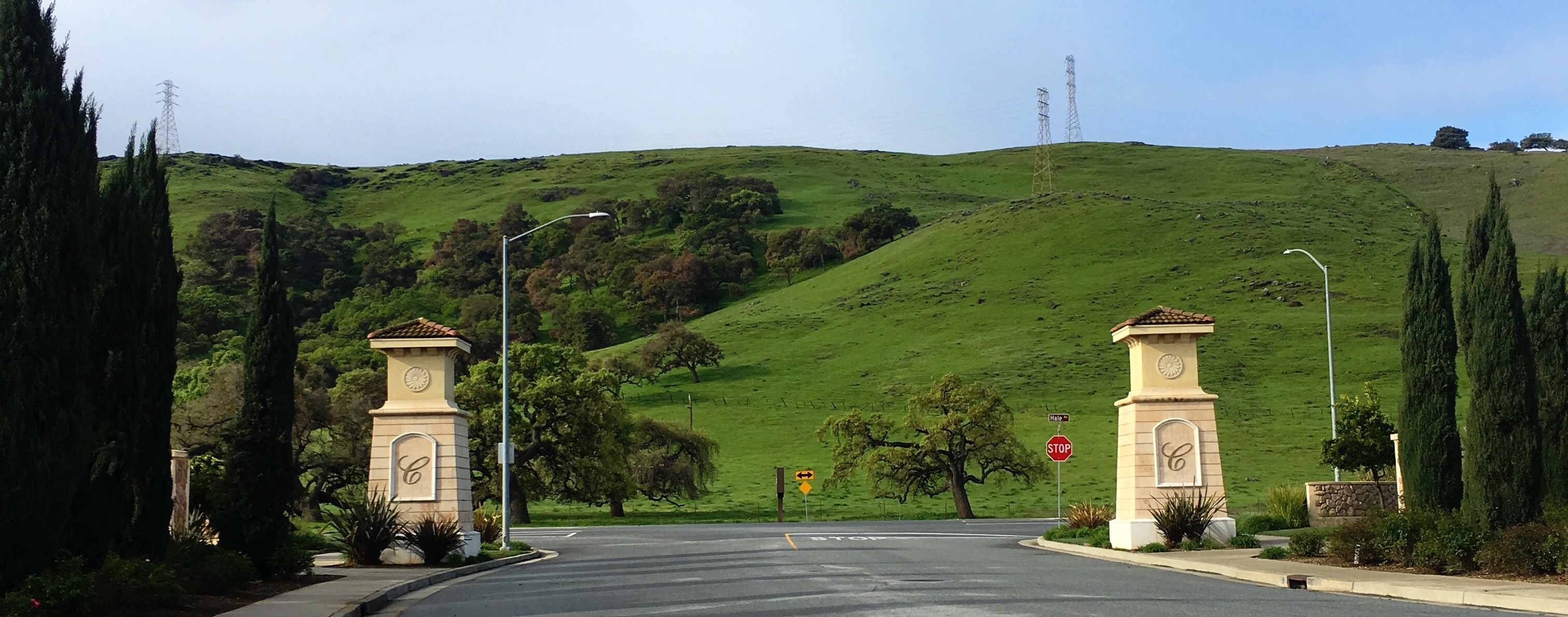
Madrone hills.

Madrone is home to a number of Silicon Valley tech companies, all housed within the Madrone Business Park, on Madrone Parkway. Some of these companies include:

- Paramit Corporation
- Harris Corporation
- NxEdge
- Amtech Microelectronics

Madrone is also home to numerous small businesses and community organizations, such as:

- Josephine Bakery, a high-end, specialty bakery housed in a historic Spanish Revival building.
- Edward Boss Prado Foundation, a Morgan Hill charitable foundation

== Education ==
Madrone is served by the Morgan Hill Unified School District:

- Sobrato High School
- Central High School
- Morgan Hill Charter School
