= Marconi, California =

Unincorporated community in California, United States

Marconi
- Unincorporated community
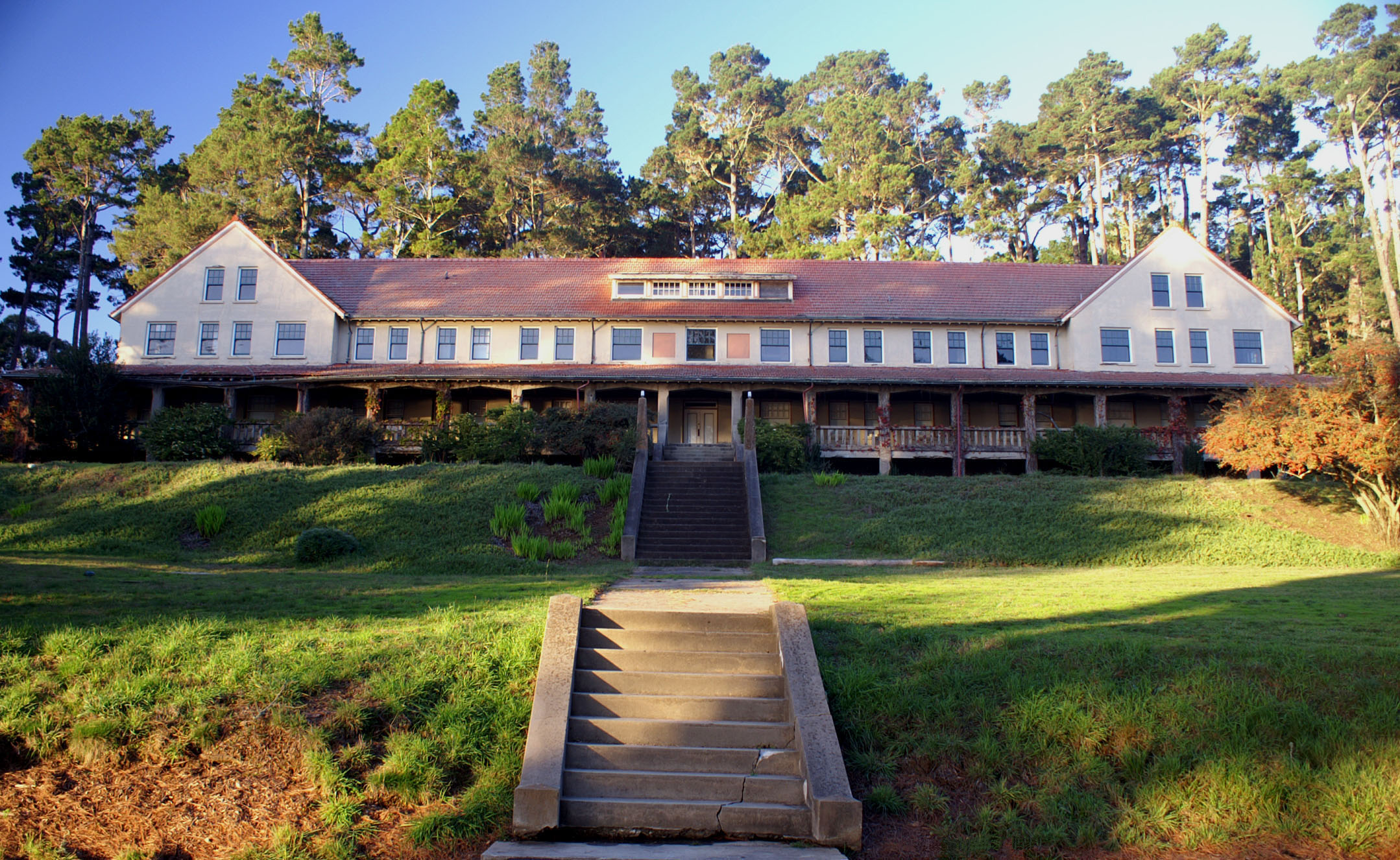
- old hotel at the conference center in Marconi

- Location in California Marconi (the United States)
- Coordinates: 38°08′38″N 122°52′42″W
- Country: United States
- State: California
- County: Marin County
- Elevation: 69 ft (21 m)
- ZIP code: 94956
- Area codes: 415/628
- FIPS code: 06-45697
- GNIS feature ID: 1659056

Marconi (formerly called Fisherman's) is an unincorporated community in Marin County, California, United States. It is located on the northeast shore of Tomales Bay, approximately seven miles (11 km) south-southeast of the village of Tomales, at an elevation of about 70 feet (21 meters) above sea level. Marconi is located within the area of the town of Marshall.

The inhabitants of an old Native American settlement called "Fisherman's" later shipped seafood from here via railroad. Then, in 1913, the Marconi Wireless Company bought this site to establish a transpacific wireless telegraph station. The site was taken over by the federal government, who eventually released it to General Electric ownership. In the 1960s the facility was renovated to become a residential hotel, but it soon became an addiction-recovery facility operated by the Synanon cult. The California State Parks system took over the site in the 1980s, and now operates it as the Marconi Conference Center State Historic Park. The conference center is planned to be restored to a functioning hotel by late 2024.

== See also ==
- Marconi Conference Center
- Wireless telegraphy
