= Peppermint (disambiguation) =

Peppermint is a Mentha-genus herb.

Peppermint may also refer to:

- Agonis flexuosa, Western Australian peppermint
- Some Eucalyptus species, such as black peppermint or Risdon peppermint
- A mint-flavored variety of hard candy or boiled sweet
- Peppermint (entertainer), American drag queen
- Peppermint (EP), an EP by Sloan
- Peppermint OS, a computer operating system
- Peppermint (1999 film), 1999 Greek film
- Peppermint (2018 film), 2018 American film starring Jennifer Garner
- Peppermint Patty, a character from the comic strip Peanuts
- Peppermint Butler, a character in the animated series Adventure Time

== See also ==
- Pippermint (1899−1920), an Argentine-bred racehorse
- Pippermint, part of an alternative name for GET 27
