= Mint (web analytics software) =

Mint is a deprecated server-based web analytics tool. It tracks traffic trends, HTTP referrers, and search trends.

The developer Shaun Inman discontinued sales and support on December 24, 2016.

== See also ==
- Web analytics
- List of web analytics software
