= Milligan, California =

Milligan
- Ghost town
- Location within the state of California Milligan (the United States)
- Coordinates: 34°16′36″N 115°10′13″W
- Country: United States
- State: California
- County: San Bernardino
- Time zone: UTC-8 (Pacific (PST))
  - Summer (DST): UTC-7 (PDT)
- GNIS feature ID: 252940

Milligan is an abandoned settlement in San Bernardino County, California. Milligan is located at 34.2766750, -115.1702567 along Cadiz Road.

== History ==
In the 1930s, the Lucky Jim Mine near Milligan produced silver-copper ore which was shipped to Douglas, Arizona for smelting. Located at a railroad siding of the Arizona and California Railroad, almost all traces of the settlement are now gone. An abandoned cemetery is in Milligan with 11 unmarked graves.
