= Mentos =

Brand of mints

- Product type: Scotch mints
- Current owner: Perfetti Van Melle
- Country: Netherlands
- Introduced: 1932; 94 years ago
- Markets: Worldwide
- Previous owners: Van Melle NV
- Tagline: "Yes To Fresh"
- Website: www.mentos.com

Mentos are a brand of packaged scotch mints or mint-flavored candies owned by the Italian-Dutch company Perfetti Van Melle. First produced in 1932, they are now sold in more than 130 countries. The mints are small oblate spheroids, with a slightly hard exterior and a soft, chewy interior. They are sold in many stores and vending machines.

They are typically sold in rolls that contain 14 mint discs, although the "Sour Mix" variety contains only 11 discs per roll. Smaller versions also exist, which typically contain 4 to 6 discs per roll. Certain flavors are sold in boxes in Australia, the United States, Malaysia, Indonesia, Brazil, and the United Kingdom. The current slogan of Mentos is "Stay Fresh", while the line previously used extensively in the 1980s and 1990s was "The Freshmaker". Some Mentos packages describe the mints as "chewy dragées". The typical Mentos roll is approximately 2 cm (0.79 in) in diameter and weighs 38 grams (1.3 oz). "Mentos" is the singular form.

== Ingredients ==
Mint-flavored Mentos contain sugar, wheat glucose syrup, hydrogenated coconut oil, rice starch, natural flavors, gum arabic, sucrose esters of fatty acids, gellan gum, carnauba wax, and beeswax. Fruit-flavored Mentos contain sugar, wheat glucose syrup, hydrogenated coconut oil, citric acid, fruit juices from concentrate (strawberry, orange, lemon) (1%), rice starch, gum arabic, natural flavors, sucrose esters of fatty acids, gellan gum, carnauba wax, colors (beta-carotene, beetroot red), and beeswax. The formulation can vary based on country of manufacture.

== Flavors ==
Mentos are available in several flavors, including mint, mixed fruit, cola, bubble gum, and in an assortment of orange, strawberry, and lemon. New flavors were initially test-marketed in the Netherlands and throughout Europe; however, most of the flavors have been available worldwide recently.

Other flavors include green apple, cinnamon, strawberry, mixed fruit (which contains a mix of cherry, strawberry, orange, and lemon flavors), grape, wintergreen, grapefruit, peach, plum, spearmint, strawberry yogurt, lemon yogurt, pineapple (pine fresh), red apple, currant and two versions of licorice-flavored Mentos. Two varieties of the mint flavor, known as "Mentos Strong" and "Air Action Mentos", are sold in the Netherlands. Also available in the Netherlands is the Special Mix 4-pack, containing the flavors mint, fruit, berry mix, strawberry, banana, cherry, and mango-orange. Two varieties of the mint flavor are also sold in China, known as "Mint" and "Strong Mint". Grape and 'N Cream (presumably Apples and Cream), Strawberry 'N Cream, and Banana 'N Cream are also marketed in Asia. Chocolate Mentos was produced in 1989, but the flavor was discontinued. The chocolate variant is still available in some Asian countries. In 2006, the citrus mango flavor was introduced to the Japanese market. In the Philippines, a "Dalandan Fresh" variant is available. Other varieties of Mentos include: Mentos Sours, which recently became available in the United States, featuring Watermelon, Green Apple, and Lemon flavors; caffeinated "Energy" Mentos, sold mainly in Germany, where one roll equals the amount of caffeine in two cups of coffee; "Fresh Cola"-flavored Mentos released in New Zealand, Australia and parts of Europe and Asia; and "AIR Mentos" containing menthol, which are sold primarily in Belgium and the Netherlands. In India, the major flavors available are mint, lemon, strawberry, orange, watermelon, and cola.

Mentos also makes chewing gum available in various flavors. It is available in Germany, Australia, Greece, China, Canada, Brazil, Turkey, the Netherlands, Poland, the Philippines, the United Kingdom, and, recently, the United States, in blisters and bottles, in three different flavors. In the Netherlands, Mentos Gum is sold in blisters and bottles in six different varieties: Pure (four flavors), Fruit (four flavors), Regular (five flavors), Bubblegum, Cubes (four flavors), and White (three flavors).

Mentos Sugar Free

In August 2005, the mint variety, which comes in "mixed berries" and "cool mint" flavors, was sweetened with sucralose. In the Netherlands, the flavors mint, licorice, and fruit are also available in a sugar-free variety.

Australian varieties of Mentos are Fruit, Rainbow, Mint, Spearmint, Soft Drink, and Smoothies.

The UK has five current flavors of rolls:

- Fruit (Orange, Lemon, and Strawberry)
- Mint
- Rainbow (with dragées each of: Strawberry, Apple, Raspberry, Orange, Watermelon, Blueberry, and Pink Grapefruit (the last two were new flavors for 2015, replacing Grape and Pineapple).
- Spearmint
- Discovery (with 14 different flavors: Passionfruit, Lychee, Blackcurrant, Blueberry, Lime, Strawberry, Raspberry, Orange, Lemon, Watermelon, Banana, Grape, Cherry, and Pineapple; always appearing in that order).
- Tutti-Frutti — bubblegum-flavored — new for 2012.
- Fanta flavor (orange flavored, but a stronger, juicier flavor than standard orange)

In the UK, Mentos Gum is also available in stick packs (peppermint, spearmint, pure white, air action (menthol), and fruit), Bottles (spearmint, peppermint, and red fruit, which retail for approximately £0.99), and flip-top boxes. Flavors include peppermint or spearmint with green tea extract, and a pure white with white tea extract. Sugar-free versions are available but are rarer to find, usually only in supermarkets. Mentos gum holds a 4% market share of the UK gum market. A new Mentos 3 was launched in January 2011, in two flavors - mint and Strawberry/Apple/Raspberry, which are similar to Wrigleys' 5 in packaging. A new blackberry/kiwi/strawberry version was released into the UK market in January 2012.

In Greece, Mentos are very popular and are available in the following flavors:

- Mint
- Strawberry
- Melon
- Watermelon
- Fruit (Orange, lemon, and strawberry)
- Energy (each roll is equivalent to 2 cups of coffee)
- Mentos gum in Bottles
- Mentos Cube
- Mentos in Boxes (mint and fruit).

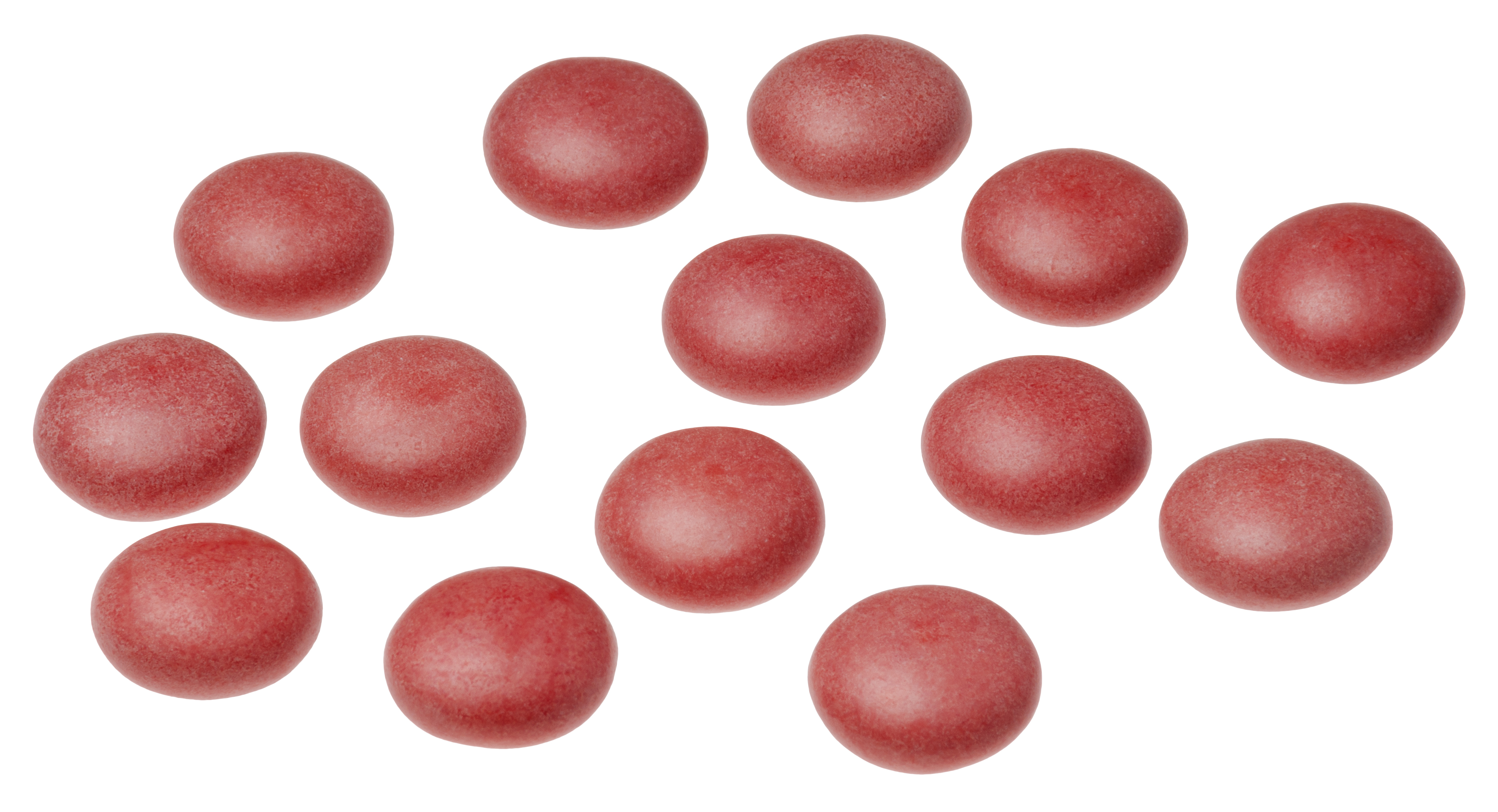
Cinnamon Mentos

Mini Mentos, somewhat smaller than ordinary Mentos, are available in the Netherlands in two varieties: Mini Mentos Fruitmix, which contains the flavors orange, lemon, strawberry, and apple, and Mini Mentos Yogurt, with the flavors strawberry yogurt, raspberry yogurt, and blueberry yogurt. Also sold is Mentos KIDZ, a bag with 12 boxes, each containing 10 miniature candies in the flavors strawberry, orange, lemon, apple, and blueberry.

"Mentos Teens" is available in Brazil and across Latin America. They come in a rectangular box. The mint is basically miniature Mentos, roughly the size of Skittles, and they come in mixed flavors: white grape (green), lemon (yellow), strawberry (pink), orange (orange), raspberry (blue), and cherry (red).

During the 2014 FIFA World Cup, a Brazilian team-branded Mentos was released in Brazil to support the national team. The mint had green apple and orange flavors.

In some countries, Mentos Ice candy is available in flavors such as cherry (red), green apple (green), and grape (purple).

Ume, Fuji apple, and Pine Fresh (pineapple) Mentos are sold exclusively in Japan.

Flavors only available in certain countries: Enigma (Czech Republic) Rainbow (UK, Sweden and US) Ume (Japan) Fuji Apple (Japan) Pine Fresh (Japan) Ice (Canada)

== Marketing ==
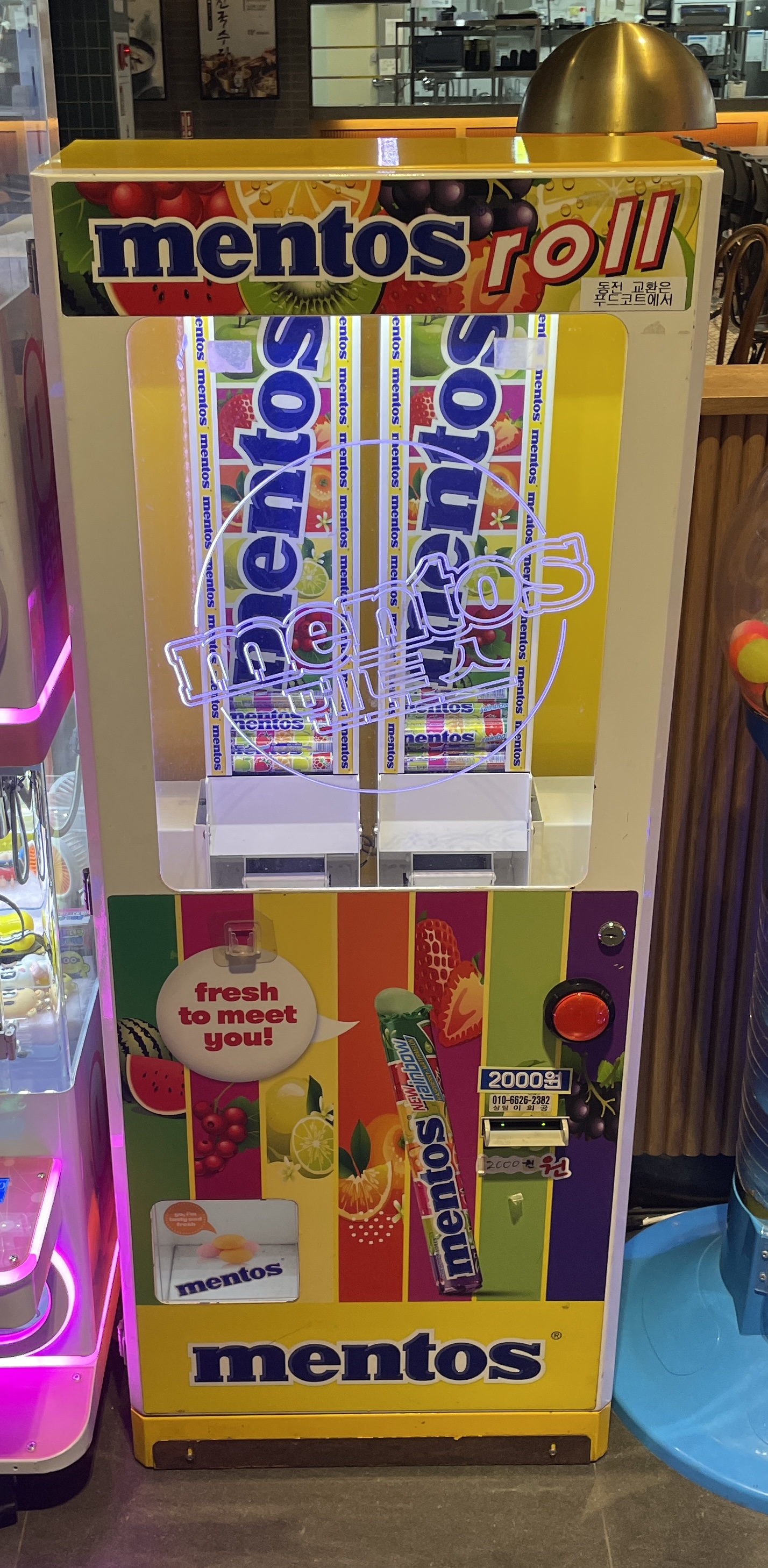
Mentos Vending Machine in South Korea

Part of Mentos's popularity in the US and Canada can be attributed to its campy TV commercials and catchy jingle, which debuted in late 1991 and was used well into 2001 on American and Canadian television. Individuals facing various day-to-day dilemmas consume Mentos and are subsequently inspired to solve their problems at hand in a creative, often-humorous fashion. For example, a job interviewee sits on a freshly painted bench, staining his suit, and then solves the problem by rolling around on the bench until his suit has pinstripes. Another featured a woman whose parked car is boxed in; she calls a crew of construction workers over who lift her car onto the road for her. These unusual behaviors are typically witnessed by nearby, sometimes antagonistic characters, and a roll of Mentos is boisterously displayed by the commercial's respective protagonist to the observer as an explanation for their actions. The ad campaign was parodied in multiple television shows and music videos, including the Foo Fighters' "Big Me".

In 2012, Mentos produced a Singapore-specific advertisement—"National Night"—to promote an "I Love SG" edition pack, encouraging residents to "do their civic duty" and copulate on National Day to help combat the country's low fertility rate.

== Reaction with carbonated beverages ==
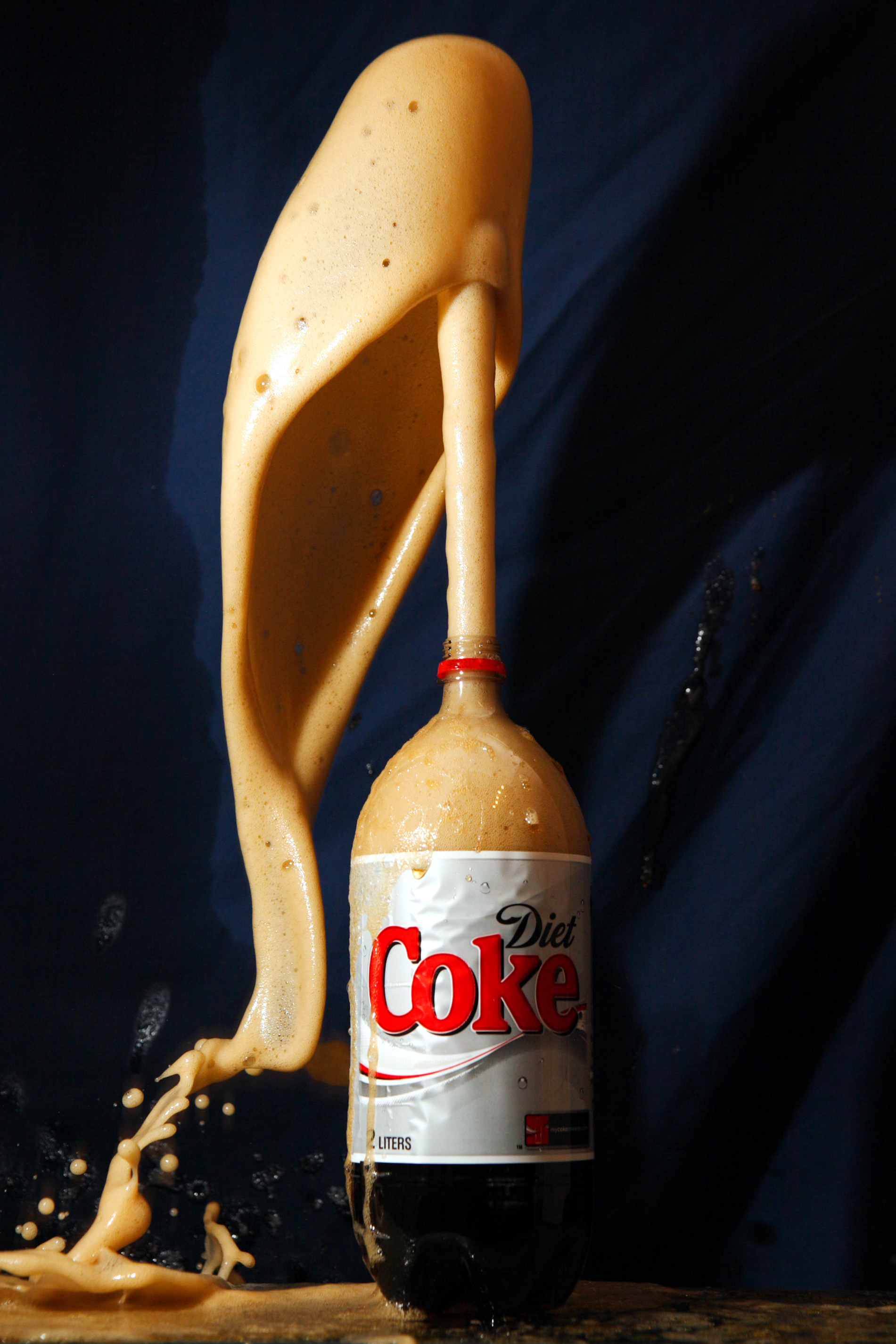
A Diet Coke bottle, shortly after Mentos were dropped into it

First publicly demonstrated by chemistry teacher Lee Marek on the Late Show with David Letterman on September 14, 1999, and later popularized in a June 2006 viral Internet video by Eepybird, a Mentos mint expedites a rapid release of carbon dioxide when dropped into a carbonated liquid, such as a soft drink. MythBusters concluded that the potassium benzoate, aspartame, and CO_{2} gas contained in the Diet Coke, in combination with the gelatin and gum arabic ingredients of the Mentos, all contribute to the formation of the foam. However, kinetic experiments with various candies have shown that the presence of gelatin and gum arabic in candies does not enhance the fountain. Rather, it is the physical structure of candies that conveys the fountain effect.

The structure of the Mentos is the most significant cause of the eruption due to nucleation. MythBusters reported that when fruit-flavored Mentos with a smooth waxy coating were tested in carbonated drink, there was hardly a reaction, whereas mint-flavored Mentos (with no such coating) added to carbonated drink formed an energetic eruption, supporting the nucleation-site theory. According to MythBusters, the surface of the mint Mentos is covered with many small holes that increase the surface area available for reaction (and thus the quantity of reagents exposed to each other at any given time), thereby allowing CO_{2} bubbles to form with the rapidity and quantity necessary for the "jet"-, "geyser"-, or "eruption"-like nature of the effusion.

This hypothesis gained further support when rock salt was used as a "jump start" to the reaction. A paper by Tonya Coffey, a physicist at Appalachian State University in Boone, North Carolina, confirmed that the rough surface of the Mentos candy helps speed the reaction. Coffey also found that the aspartame in diet soda lowers the surface tension and causes a bigger reaction, but that caffeine does not accelerate the reaction. On the other hand, it has been shown that a wide variety of beverage additives, such as sugars, citric acid, and natural flavors, also enhance fountain heights. In some cases, dissolved solids that increase the surface tension of water (such as sugars) also increase fountain heights. These results suggest that additives serve to enhance geyser heights not by decreasing surface tension, but rather by decreasing bubble coalescence. Reduced bubble coalescence results in smaller bubbles and greater foaming ability in water.

A Guinness World Record of 2,865 simultaneous geysers was set on October 17, 2010, in an event organized by Perfetti Van Melle (Philippines) at the SM Mall of Asia Complex, in Manila, Philippines. This record was afterwards beaten in November 2014 by another event organized by Perfetti Van Melle and Chupa Chups in Leon, Guanajuato, Mexico where 4,334 Mentos and soda fountains were set off simultaneously.

The resulting geyser can shoot as high as 6 m (20 ft). The unofficial record, reached in MythBusters, was over 34 ft (10 m) with the use of a nozzle.

== See also ==
- Confectionery
- List of breath mints
