= Mooney Flat, California =

Unincorporated community in California, United States

Mooney Flat
- Unincorporated community
- Location in California Mooney Flat (the United States)
- Coordinates: 39°12′56″N 121°16′28″W
- Country: United States
- State: California
- County: Nevada County
- Elevation: 741 ft (226 m)

Mooney Flat was an important mining and transportation hub in western Nevada County, California, just east of the Yuba County line. It was situated on modern Mooney Flat Road, about 1 mile north of modern Highway 20, at an elevation of about 800 ft.

Mooney Flat lies at the western end of the auriferous channel that runs down the San Juan Ridge. The channel disappears past French Corral and then reappears around Mooney Flat for a few miles, encompassing the communities, from east to west, of Mooney Flat, Sucker Flat, Smartsville and Timbuctoo, Smartsville was the principal town and still exists today. It is often hard to separate the history of Mooney Flat from the history of Smartsville. While the boundary drawn between Nevada County and Yuba County put Smartsville in Yuba County and Mooney Flat in Nevada County, in ensuing years, the Smartsville residents petitioned unsuccessfully to become part of Nevada County.

== Early history ==
Mooney Flat was founded in 1851 and named after Thomas Mooney. Beginning in 1856, the Schmidt (sometimes written Smith) family built a prominent hotel. Originally called the Live Oak Hotel after a tree which grew out front, it is mostly referred to as the Mooney Flat Hotel or Schmidt's Hotel. The town had a store, run initially by Messers Trail and Otis and later by William Westerfield. Mooney Flat did not have a post office, but was served by the post office at Anthony House until it closed in 1906, then by Smartsville.

The town had its own school district and a "fine" schoolhouse. The school district had 40 students in 1866, increasing to 64 students in 1883. The student population then began to decline until the school district was suspended in 1918 then discontinued in 1920 with the students being reassigned to the Pleasant Valley school. Union, January 5, 1866, June 16, 1883, September 9, 1920. It had its own election district with the hotel or the schoolhouse used as polling places. In 1860, 81 votes were cast in the four-way presidential race, with Lincoln receiving 30 votes. In 1880, 40 votes were cast for president but by 1912, the number was down to 11. These numbers suggest a population during its heyday of 2-300.

In 1890, the United States government issued a patent for the land on which Mooney Flat is located to Nevada Superior Court Judge Walling, for "the benefit of the occupants of the Townsite." Why this occurred is not clear; presumably there was a challenge to the ownership of the properties constituting the townsite.

== Transportation ==
Mooney Flat started as an important stop on the stage lines between Marysville and various points in Nevada County including North San Juan, which crossed the Yuba River around Bridgeport. In the 1860s, those lines were extended to reach the mines around Virginia City, Nevada, over what became known as the Henness Pass Road. The Mooney Flat Hotel became an important stop over for travelers and teamsters. By the time it was completed in 1870, it contained three stories. The first floor contained the public rooms and the Schmidts' bedroom. The second floor contained guest bedrooms and a ballroom. The third-floor was essentially a bunkhouse for teamsters, miners and single travellers.

== Mining ==
Hydraulic mining began around Mooney Flat in 1855. It was quite extensive and profitable. The US Commissioner of Mining Statistics opined that: "The country extending from Timbuctoo to Mooney Flat (three miles) is generally conceded to have been the richest in actual returns...of all the hydraulic-mining districts in California up to the present time." The principal companies included the Mooney Flat Hydraulic Mining Company; the Deer Creek Mining Company; the Excelsior Water and Mining Company, and later the Black Swan. The Excelsior also owned over 150 miles of ditches, taking water from Deer Creek and the Yuba River. Around 1879, the Excelsior acquired a generator and installed electric lights at its Mooney Flat diggins. These were the first electric lights used for industrial purposes in the United States and made night time mining possible.

In 1878, one newspaper reported that “most all the ground west of Mooney Flat is about worked out and that on Mooney Flat is not looking as well as expected." By 1881 "Mooney Flat had become a deserted village within two months. Less than eight per cent of the miners remained." But in 1882, there was a revival of mining with the discovery of new areas of rich gravel. One paper noted that "The discovery of gold-bearing gravel at Mooney Flat caused something of a stampede from the surrounding counties." However, after 1884 when Judge Sawyer issued his famous injunction against the dumping of mining debris into the Yuba River or its tributaries such as Deer Creek, hydraulic mining greatly diminished. Soon there was "the promise of a revival of mining at Mooney Flat" through drift mining. Drift mining continued through the 1890s into the early part of the 20th century.

== Agriculture ==
Especially as mining declined, agriculture became important around Mooney Flat. One paper reported that the area presented "a chance for men of small means to establish paying orchards." Orchard products included citrus fruits, cherries and olives. The Excelsior Water Company provided irrigation. Even cotton was planted.

== Thomas Mooney ==
Thomas Mooney was born in Ireland in 1821. He arrived in Yuba County in 1851. His connection with the town named after him is not clear from the historical record. That same year he acquired an existing 360 acre ranch near Smartsville, which he renamed the Empire Ranch. The ranch was about one mile southwest of Mooney Flat. He established a trading post and hotel there, and turned the Empire Ranch into what one historian termed "the most important settlement in Northern California." For a time, he ran a stage line between Marysville and Nevada City. He was renowned for the horses he bred and for the products of his ranch. Reportedly, he grew an 8 pound sweet potato, the "largest ever raised." He married Mary Huling in 1857 and they had eight children. He died in 1884.

== George Schmidt ==
George Schmidt was born in Bavaria in 1813. He arrived in Nevada County around 1855. He began building the Mooney Flat Hotel in 1856, completing it in stages by 1870. He married Veronica Mertz and they had seven children. He and his descendants operated the hotel well into the 20th century. George died in 1900 and Veronica in 1909.

== Mooney Flat today ==
In the 21st century, Mooney Flat is a rural residential and farming area. Less than a mile to the northwest of the old town site is Englebright Lake. Originally built to capture and retain mining debris, it is now a popular recreation site. Nothing readily visible remains of the mining town. The Mooney Flat Hotel badly deteriorated and was torn down in 1958. On its site is a historical marker which reads: Mooney Flat Hotel 1856-1958. Site of the first 3 story team & stage stop on the Henness Pass route to the Northern Mines and Comstock Lode. Built and operated by George and Veronica Schmidt. Served miners, travelers, & teamsters. The Black Swan Mine site is now a nature preserve with extensive hiking trails.
