= Minturn, California =

Unincorporated community in California, United States

Minturn
- Unincorporated community
- Location in California Minturn (the United States)
- Coordinates: 37°08′23″N 120°16′28″W
- Country: United States
- State: California
- County: Madera
- Elevation: 236 ft (72 m)

Minturn is an unincorporated community in Madera County, California, United States. It is located on the Atchison, Topeka and Santa Fe Railroad and California State Route 99, 1.5 miles (2 km) north-northwest of Chowchilla, at an elevation of 236 feet (72 m). Minturn is near the Geographic Center of California, between Madera and Merced.

A post office operated at Minturn from 1884 to 1922. The name honors Jonas and Thomas Minturn, wheat farmers who had a railroad siding built at the place in 1872. Jonas (April 4, 1819–August 1, 1884) and Abby West (March 8, 1820–May 19, 1899) Minturn (m. 1843), settled in the area in the 19th century and are buried nearby.

The Minturn Nut Company is located nearby at 8800 S. Minturn Road, Le Grand.

== Related information ==
Jonas Minturn was a member of the same family that ran Grinnell, Minturn & Co.

Jonas and Abby West Minturn's children were Mary, Thomas, Gertrude, Madeline, and James. James W. Minturn went on to run The Sharon Estate. He built a country home in Sunnyside, Fresno County in 1912 and completed it in 1913. The home still stands today across from Sunnyside Country Club. He was killed as a result of an automobile accident in 1917. He was survived by his wife Rozene Minturn. (Fresno Morning Republican Newspaper)
