= Mulford Landing, San Leandro, California =

Coordinates: 37°41′50″N 122°11′10″W

Mulford Landing is a neighborhood in San Leandro in Alameda County, California. It was formerly an unincorporated community. It southwest of Mulford Gardens, on San Francisco Bay. The San Leandro Marina city park and shoreline is located in this neighborhood as well as the Shoreline Recreation area, which hosts restaurants, boat launches, a hotel and a golf course.
