= May, California =

May
- Former settlement
- Location in California
- Coordinates: 38°25′12″N 121°00′26″W
- Country: United States
- State: California
- County: Amador
- Elevation: 223 ft (68 m)

May is a former settlement in Amador County, California, United States. It was located approximately one mile (1.6 km) north of Carbondale, at an elevation of 223 feet (68 m). A post office operated at May from 1881 to 1920.
