= Millspaugh, California =

Unincorporated community in California, United States

Millspaugh
- Unincorporated community
- Location in California Millspaugh (the United States)
- Coordinates: 36°02′46″N 117°27′39″W
- Country: United States
- State: California
- County: Inyo
- Elevation: 6,175 ft (1,882 m)

Millspaugh was a gold mining camp in the Argus Mountains in Inyo County, California, United States. Construction of the camp began in 1900 and gold production commenced. The major mine was The Yellow Metal. Many of the original mine buildings burnt in a fire in 1902. The buildings were rebuilt and improved and operations began again. The mining operations ceased in 1910 because the mine was not producing enough gold to make a profit.

Millspaugh was named for Almon N. Millspaugh, who, while prospecting in the area, had bought mining claims from a more successful prospector. The mining operation was a family business, with all capital raised by family and friends of Millspaugh. This was not common, most metal mining at the time was funded by corporate ventures. The camp also provided assaying services to other miners. The assayer was one of the co-owners of the business, a woman named Jessie Fowzer.

Millspaugh has mistakenly been thought to be a town or a community because it had a post office, which operated from 1902 to 1910. Millspaugh was located on the stage route between Darwin and Ballarat, California, and the post office served all the miners in the area, including those at other mines.

Millspaugh lies at an elevation of 6,174 feet (1,882 m). It is within the boundaries of the China Lake Naval Air Weapons Station and cannot be accessed by the general public. One of the original facilities still remains, the boiler and its masonry, the others were repurposed for cattle ranching.
