= H. K. Mulford Company =

Pharmaceutical company in Pennsylvania, United States

The H. K. Mulford Company was a pharmaceutical company founded in Philadelphia, Pennsylvania. The company was founded in the late 1880s by Henry K. Mulford after his purchase of the Old Simes drugstore at 18th and Market Streets. The company was purchased by Sharp & Dohme Corp in 1929.

== History ==
Henry Kendall Mulford (October 10, 1866 – October 15, 1937) was a graduate of the Philadelphia College of Pharmacy. Soon after purchasing the Old Simes retail pharmacy store, Mulford began producing and selling pharmaceutical preparations. In 1889, he received financial investment to expand operations from Milton Campbell. In 1891, Campbell became president of the company, with Mulford vice president. Milton patented a compressed tablet machine. By 1892 the company had two laboratories, a field office in Chicago, and produced 800 different products.

The company opened a laboratory in Glenolden, Pennsylvania, in 1894 for the production of a diphtheria antitoxin. In 1895, it became the first commercial producer of diphtheria antitoxin in the United States. The company augmented its scientific research with staff and partnerships from the University of Pennsylvania's medical and veterinary departments.

In 1909, the company opened a branch in San Francisco, California.

By 1920, the company employed about one thousand employees and had 52 buildings on a 200-acre property in Glenolden and Folcroft, Pennsylvania. The company property was surrounded by pastures for horses and cows which were needed to produce serum and antitoxins. The company also grew gardens of plants for research and products, including acres of the purple foxglove flower for the heart medicine digitalis.

In 1929, the company merged with Sharp & Dohme Corp. At the time, H. K. Mulford company produced many human and veterinary medicines, including a smallpox vaccine, the rabies vaccine, and antivenin.

== See also ==
- Mulford Building
