= Mulfords Run =

Stream in Ohio, U.S.

Coordinates: 39°25′48″N 84°14′18″W

Mulfords Run is a stream in the U.S. state of Ohio.

Mulfords Run was named in honor of a local family.
