= Mulford Building =

- U.S. National Register of Historic Places
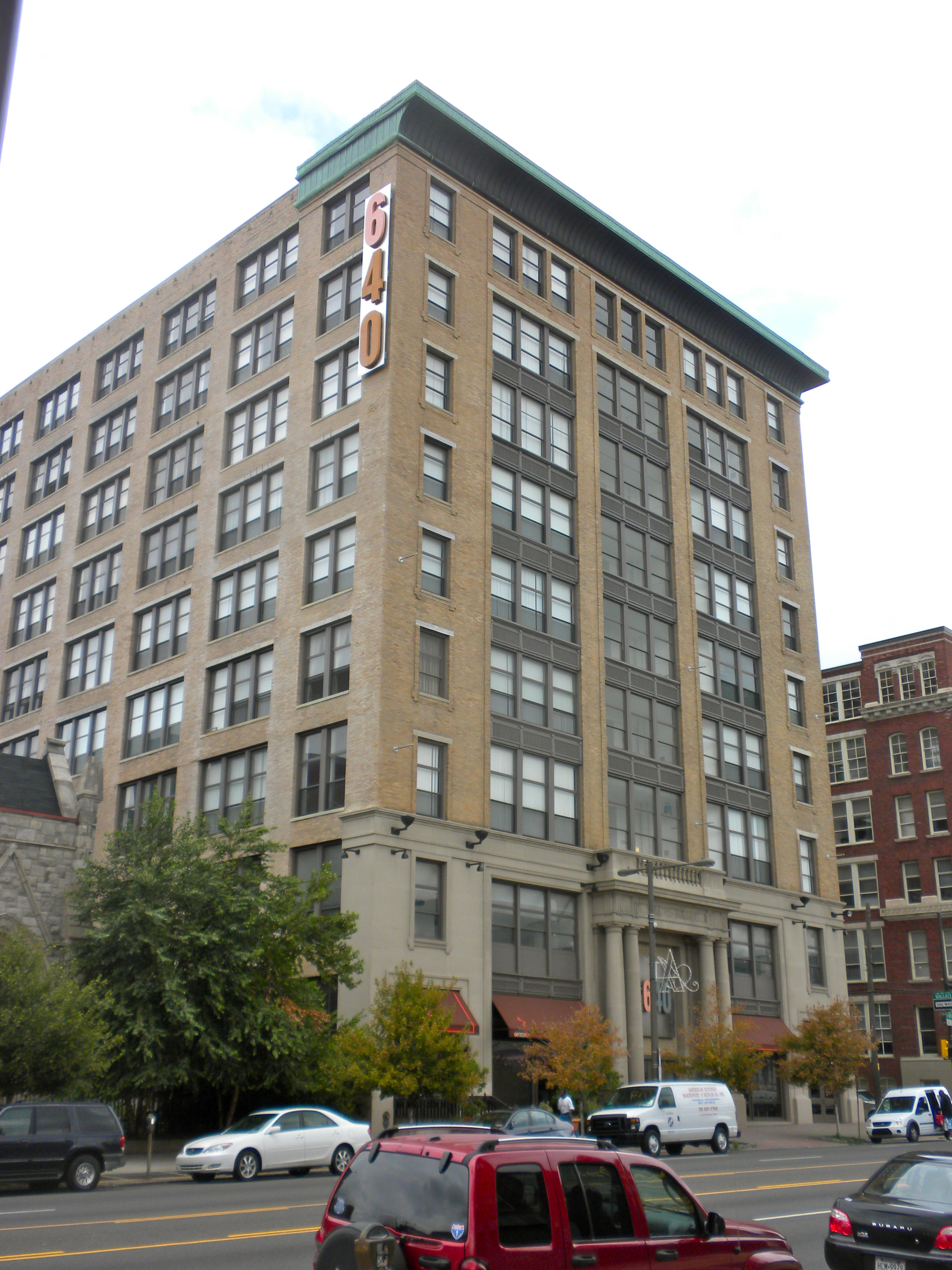
- Mulford Building, August 2010

- Location within Philadelphia Location within Pennsylvania Location within the United States
- Location: 640 N. Broad St., Philadelphia, Pennsylvania
- Coordinates: 39°57′57″N 75°10′26″W
- Area: less than one acre
- Built: 1912–1913
- Architect: Charles Balderston
- Architectural style: Classical Revival
- NRHP reference No.: 04000882
- Added to NRHP: August 20, 2004

The Mulford Building is an historic, light manufacturing, loft building in the Spring Garden neighborhood of Philadelphia, Pennsylvania, United States.

It was added to the National Register of Historic Places in 2004.

== History and architectural features ==
Built between 1912 and 1913, this historic structure is a nine-story, steel-frame building that is clad in brick. Designed in the Classical Revival style, it measures 400 by 100 feet (122 by 30 m). A four-story addition was built in 1934. It originally housed clothing manufacturers, until purchased by the H. K. Mulford Company, pharmaceutical manufacturers, in 1918, which occupied the building until 1963, after which it again housed clothing manufacturers.

It was added to the National Register of Historic Places in 2004.
