= Minton =

Minton may refer to:

== Places ==
- Minton, Saskatchewan, a Canadian village
- Minton, Shropshire, a hamlet in the parish of Church Stretton, England
- Minton, a fictional town in New England featured in the 1860 novel The Ebony Idol by G.M. Flanders

== People with the given name ==
- Minton Warren (1850–1907), American classical scholar

== Other uses ==
- Minton (surname)

== See also ==
- Mintons, an English pottery manufacturing company
- Minton's Playhouse, a bar and jazz club in New York City, United States
- Mintonette, original name for the sport volleyball
