= Merlin, California =

Merlin
- Named location
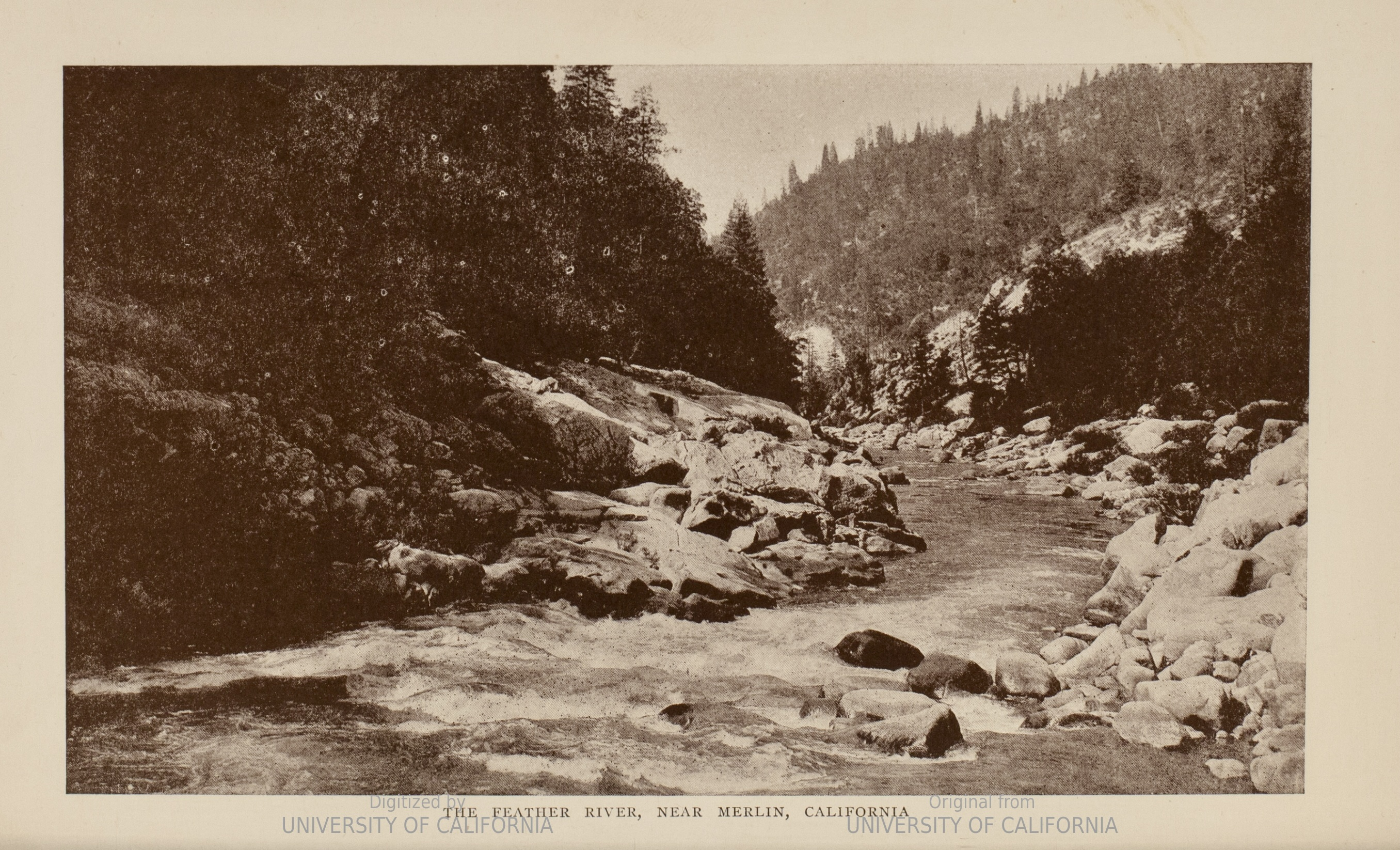
- Feather River near Merlin, California c. 1916

- Location in California Merlin (the United States)
- Coordinates: 39°53′18″N 121°22′01″W
- Country: United States
- State: California
- County: Plumas County
- Elevation: 1,765 ft (538 m)

Merlin is a siding and former water stop of the Western Pacific Railroad, located along the Feather River in Plumas County, California. It lies at an elevation of 1,765 feet (538 m), southwest of Storrie.
