= Menlo Baths, California =

Former settlement in California, United States

Menlo Baths
- Unincorporated community
- Location in California Menlo Baths (the United States)
- Coordinates: 41°15′57″N 120°05′02″W
- Country: United States
- State: California
- County: Modoc
- Elevation: 4,587 ft (1,398 m)

Menlo Baths is a former settlement in Modoc County, California, United States. It was located 4 miles (6.4 km) south-southeast of Eagleville, at an elevation of 4587 feet (1398 m).

The Menlo Baths were a hot springs resort community in the early twentieth century; the site burned in 1934.
