= Minter Village, California =

Unincorporated community in California, United States

Minter Village
- Unincorporated community
- Location in California Minter Village (the United States)
- Coordinates: 35°30′13″N 119°10′58″W
- Country: United States
- State: California
- County: Kern
- Elevation: 423 ft (129 m)

Minter Village is an unincorporated community in Kern County, California, United States. It is located 13 miles (21 km) northwest of Bakersfield, at an elevation of 423 feet (129 m). During World War II, the place was the site of an Army Air Corps airfield Minter Field. Minter Village was founded in 1946, following the deactivation of the field. The Minter Field post office operated from 1942 to 1949. The Minter Village post office operated from 1948 to 1961.
