= Mayaro, California =

Unincorporated community in California, United States

- Unincorporated community
- Location in California Mayaro, California (the United States)
- Coordinates: 39°49′27″N 121°25′20″W
- Country: United States
- State: California
- County: Butte
- Elevation: 1,522 ft (464 m)

Mayaro is a former unincorporated community in Butte County, California, United States. It lies on Camp Creek at an elevation of 1522 feet (464 m) and is located at 39°49′27″N 121°25′20″W. A post office operated at Mayaro from 1930 to 1956. Mayaro was the site of a popular lodge that opened in the early twentieth century. The lodge closed circa 1970 and became an outdoor school for special-needs boys. A rock slide blocking the road to the site caused the camp to close in 1975, and nothing remains at the site as of 2026.
