= Melvin, California =

Melvin
- Former unincorporated community District of Clovis
- Location in California
- Coordinates: 36°48′31″N 119°42′04″W
- Country: United States
- State: California
- County: Fresno County
- City: Clovis
- Elevation: 358 ft (109 m)

Melvin is a former unincorporated community in Fresno County, California, now incorporated into Clovis. It lies at an elevation of 358 feet (109 m).
