= Marshall Station, California =

Coordinates: 37°00′50″N 119°34′09″W

Marshall Station (formerly Grabners and Marshall Junction) is a former settlement in Fresno County, California, United States. It was located near the southern end of the Auberry Valley, 3.5 miles (5.6 km) west-southwest of Prather.

The Grabners post office operated from 1914 to 1933 and from 1939 to 1951. Grabners was named in honor of a local landowner.
