= Mulford, San Leandro, California =

Coordinates: 37°41′44″N 122°11′28″W

Mulford Landing is a neighborhood in San Leandro in Alameda County, California.

Originally known as Wicks Landing, the landing at San Leandro was founded in 1853 by Moses Wicks, Thomas W. Mulford, Eliphalet M. Smith, and William Smith. They made a living by selling wildfowl, which was trapped in the Rancho San Leandro and transported from their landing across the Bay to San Francisco. Mulford, who had come to California in 1849, bought the others out in 1868.

The Mulford station on the South Pacific Coast railway line between Alameda Point and Newark took its original name from this. It was later renamed the West San Leandro station when the Southern Pacific Railroad Company bought the line in 1887.

Thomas W. Mulford also leased from José Joaquín Estudillo, and eventually owned, a farm named Shore Acres; had an oyster fishery; and was the manager of a hotel and restaurant in San Leandro, Estudillo House built in 1855. The farm lost all of its livestock as a result of a mass slaughter to stem hoof-and-mouth disease in 1924, and the farmland, which had been in Mulford family hands until that time, was sold in 1927 to form a subdivision, named Mulford Gardens. In 1957, this subdivision was then incorporated into San Leandro.
