= Spearmint (flavour) =

Mint flavor

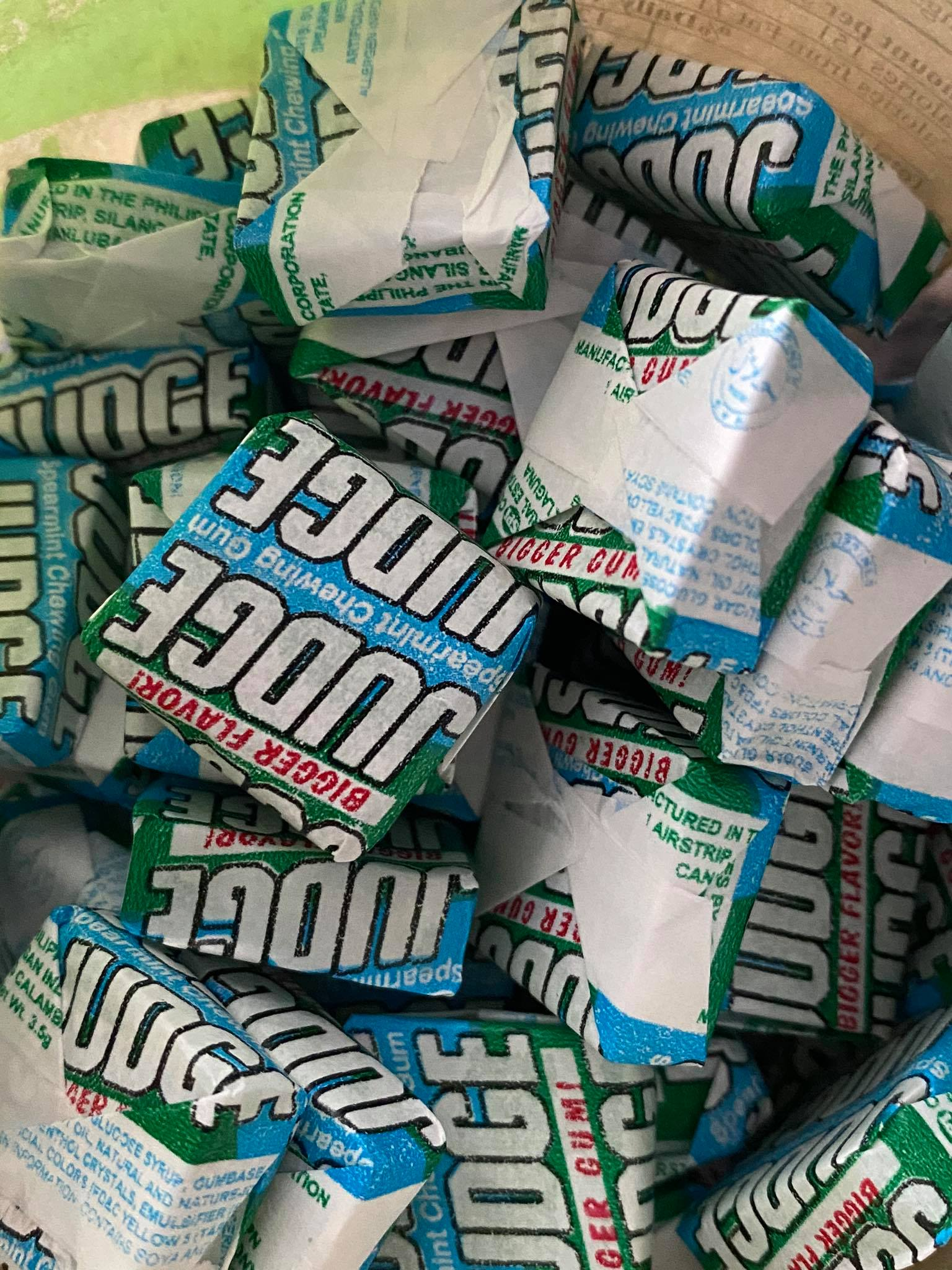
Spearmint flavored chewing gum.

Spearmint is a flavour that is either naturally or artificially created to taste like the oil of the herbaceous Mentha spicata (spearmint) plant.

== Uses ==
The most common uses for spearmint flavor is in chewing gum and toothpaste. However, it is also used in a number of other products, mainly confectionery. It is also popular as a seasonal (usually around St. Patrick's Day) milkshake flavoring in Canada and the U.S.

== Trademark in the UK ==
The words "WRIGLEY'S SPEARMINT" are trademarked in the UK. In 1959, skiffle artist Lonnie Donegan renamed his cover version of the 1924 Rose, Breuer, and Bloom song "Does the Spearmint Lose its Flavor on the Bedpost Overnight?" as the BBC, not wanting to risk breaching trademark laws, refused to play it. Donegan renamed the song "Does Your Chewing Gum Lose Its Flavour (On the Bedpost Overnight?)", which then went on to become a top-10 hit in the UK and US.

== See also ==
- Carvone
