= Luminar Technologies =

2012–2026 American technology company

Luminar Technologies Inc.
- Type: Public
- Traded as: Nasdaq: LAZR OTC: LAZRQ
- Industry: Autonomous automotive technology
- Founded: December 2012; 13 years ago
- Founders: Austin Russell, Jason Eichenholz
- Fate: Chapter 11 bankruptcy
- Headquarters: Orlando, Florida, U.S.
- Key people: Paul Ricci (CEO)
- Products: Prototype; Hydra; Iris; Iris+; Sentinel
- Number of employees: 600 (2022)
- Website: luminartech.com

Luminar Technologies Inc. was an American technology company that developed vision-based lidar and machine perception technologies, primarily for self-driving cars. The company's headquarters and main research and development facilities were in Orlando, Florida; a second major office was located in Palo Alto, California.

== History ==
=== 2012–2017: Deep stealth ===
Austin Russell, a 2013 Thiel Fellow, founded Luminar in California in 2012, at the age of 17. Shortly afterward, Jason Eichenholz joined the company in Orlando as chief technology officer and co-founder. The company spent its first five years in stealth mode.

Russell's goal was to develop lidar technology with improved resolution and range by having Luminar fabricate many components in-house, rather than relying on off-the-shelf devices. To increase the time automotive lidar provides for a vehicle to react safely from one second to seven seconds at highway speeds, in 2013 Luminar decided to reevaluate the standard operating wavelength for lidar systems. Luminar's lidar operates in the infrared range at 1,550 nanometers (153 terahertz) rather than the usual 905 nanometers. This moved the lidar signal out of the range of visible light, making it safe for human eyes even at higher power levels. Luminar's infrared range can be used at power levels 40 times those permitted for the standard wavelength without endangering eyesight, increasing its resolution, especially at distances over 200 meters.

=== 2017–2019: Funding and initial partnerships ===
Luminar emerged from stealth mode in April 2017 and received $36 million in series A funding. The capital was earmarked to set up a factory in Orlando to manufacture 10,000 automotive lidar devices. In September 2017, Luminar announced a partnership with the Toyota Research Institute (TRI), the research and development arm of Toyota focused on autonomous vehicles, AI, and robotics. TRI used Luminar devices in its Platform 2.1 test vehicles, a fleet of self-driving Lexus sedans.

By 2018, Luminar was on its seventh-generation application-specific integrated circuit (ASIC) design, and it had a fully integrated technology stack. The company added a Colorado Springs location in April 2018 when it acquired Black Forest Engineering, a company that specializes in high-performance indium gallium arsenide (InGaAs) receivers. Former Uber executive Brent Schwarz joined Luminar as head of business development in September 2018.

In June 2018, Volvo and Luminar announced a partnership for Luminar to provide lidar technology for Volvo's self-driving cars planned for the 2022 model year. Luminar's lidar for Volvo is the approximate size of a VHS, optimized for highway driving, and integrated into a car's roof just above the windshield. It can receive wireless software upgrades and interface with Volvo's automatic safety features, like automatic emergency braking. Volvo also announced that Luminar was the recipient of Volvo's first investment of an undisclosed amount from its newly established venture capital program, the Volvo Cars Tech Fund.

Audi AID (Autonomous Intelligent Driving) announced a partnership with Luminar in December 2018, selecting Luminar's lidar due to its longer 250-meter range and high resolution. In July 2019, Luminar raised $100 million in additional funding, bringing the total capital raised to more than $250 million. It also developed a new model of its lidar, approximately one-third the size of the previous model. By August 2019, Luminar had 250 employees at the Central Florida Research Park in Orlando and another 100 in California. The company's portfolio includes almost 50 patents, with approximately 150 additional applications pending.

From 2017 to 2020, Luminar partnered with more than 50 companies, including 12 of the 15 largest car companies in the world.

=== 2020–present: Public offering and growth ===
In May 2020, Volvo announced a self-driving highway feature, "Highway Pilot", to be powered by Luminar's third-generation Iris lidar. Volvo said the technology would be available as an option to car buyers starting with the XC90. Also in May 2020, Tom Fennimore, previously an investment banker, joined Luminar as chief financial officer.

On August 24, 2020, Luminar announced it was going public through a special-purpose acquisition company deal, with shares to be listed on NASDAQ. The merger with Gores Metropoulos, part of The Gores Group, was projected to raise Luminar's market cap to an estimated $3.4 billion. In addition to the $400 million cash infusion from Gores Metropoulos, additional capital totaling $170 million came from Peter Thiel, the Volvo Cars Tech Fund and Alec Gores, among others. On December 3, 2020, Luminar went public, trading as LAZR. Russell retained 83% of the company's voting power and took on the role of chairman.

Daimler AG's truck unit took a minority stake in Luminar in October 2020, investing in the company as part of its efforts to develop self-driving trucks. The next month, Intel subsidiary Mobileye selected Luminar to supply lidar sensors for its autonomous vehicles. The company announced in March 2021 that it had partnered with Volvo's self-driving software subsidiary, Zenseact, to combine Luminar's hardware and Zenseact's OnePilot software into a self-driving system, called Sentinel, to be sold to automakers. Also in March 2021, SAIC Motor announced it would use Luminar sensors and Sentinel software to provide autonomous functions in its "R brand" line of vehicles. To support the work, Luminar announced it would open an office in Shanghai.

In 2020 and 2021, Luminar moved its Orlando operations from the Central Florida Research Park to its other Orlando facility to increase its manufacturing capabilities. In April 2021, Luminar expanded its business into aviation, partnering with Airbus subsidiary UpNext to test how lidar can be used to facilitate autonomous flight and improve safety conditions for helicopters and other fixed-wing aircraft. Also in April 2021, Alan Prescott, formerly acting general counsel of Tesla, became Luminar's chief legal officer. The next month, Pony.ai, a self-driving vehicle company, announced that Luminar's Iris lidar systems would be used in its next generation of robotaxis. Luminar acquired OptoGration, an avalanche photodiode manufacturer based in Wilmington, Massachusetts, in July 2021. In November 2021, Luminar announced their partnership with Nvidia to support commercial availability of autonomous vehicle capabilities by 2024. In January 2022, Mercedes-Benz announced Luminar will supply the lidar systems for future models of their vehicles including auto assist and full self driving systems.

In March of 2022, Luminar announced acquisition of Freedom Photonics LLC, a manufacturer of high-performance semiconductor lasers and photonic integrated circuits, based in Santa Barbara, California. Freedom Photonics has developed a variety of high-performance semiconductor laser technology and products, including high brightness and output power aura semiconductor laser/amplifier technology. This acquisition has brought all three key technology pillars, ASICs, photodiodes and lasers in house and completed vertical integration of the core components of the lidar transceiver.

In April of 2022, Nissan announced they would use Luminar technology to integrate advanced autonomous functionality in all their cars by 2030.

In January 2023, Luminar announced the acquisition of Civil Maps, a 3D mapping data startup that intends to integrate into its Sentinel platform. The next month it acquired Seagate's lidar division to further its lidar production capabilities. In April of 2024, Luminar acquired EM4, a carveout out of Gooch and Housego, located in Bedford, MA. This business was added to other photonics businesses within Luminar Semiconductor, a wholly owned subsidiary by Luminar.

In March 2025, Mark Rober released a video titled "Can You Fool A Self Driving Car?" comparing Luminar Technologies latest model to Tesla's self-driving capabilities. However the video was mired in controversy when it was revealed that the Luminar enabled car was driven by a Luminar employee, not self-driving, and the Tesla car did not have the FSD (Full Self-Driving) package enabled. In addition there are concerns that the 'test' was conducted multiple times, or that due to the cartoonish cut-out, Rober planned on hitting the wall with the Tesla. This video caused the stock to soar 27% when markets reopened on Monday, two days after the video was published.

In May of 2025, Austin Russell resigned from the company after a Board investigation related to ethics. He was replaced by Paul Ricci.

In November 2025, Luminar was dropped by Volvo and will no longer feature any of their lidar sensor in the 2026 ES90 and EX90 models as standard equipment. In December 2025, shortly after the Volvo termination, Luminar filed for Chapter 11 bankruptcy, listing assets between $100 million and $500 million, and liabilities between $500 million and $1 billion. In February 2026, MicroVision acquired all remaining assets from Luminar Technologies for $33 million.

== Products ==
As of April 2023, Luminar's lidar sensors ranged in price from $500 to $1,000. One sensor provides 120 degrees of vision.

=== Prototype ===
Luminar revealed its prototype sensor in April 2017 when it emerged from stealth mode. Luminar's lidar sensors are unusual in that they operate in a wavelength of 1,550 nanometers, rather than the 905 nanometers customary for previous lidar sensors. The company also opted for a different architecture from traditional lidar systems. Rather than using multiple lasers, Luminar uses a single laser that raster-scans an image thousands of times per second, like the cathode-ray tube in analog television. Luminar's lidar devices combine the vision system and interpretive processing into one unit; other companies' lidar devices require analog-to-digital converters to combine these systems. Luminar's devices use indium gallium arsenide for their chips, rather than the conventional silicon, so that the sensors can operate at 1,550 nanometers and capture light more efficiently and the lasers can be implemented on the same substrate as the computational element. To reduce the price of its sensors, Luminar engineered them to minimize the amount of expensive indium gallium arsenide required. The sensor can detect objects at up to 200 meters. Every 100 meters of vision gives a vehicle traveling at 70 miles per hour an additional three seconds to react to objects it detects. The sensor is the approximate size of a shoebox.

=== Hydra ===
At the Consumer Electronics Show in January 2020, Luminar showcased Hydra, a lidar sensor offered to automakers for a recurring fee. Hydra is designed for highway driving and can detect and classify objects out to 250 meters. Bundled with Hydra is a perception computer, powered by Nvidia's Xavier hardware. Hydra is marketed to companies creating Level 3 and 4 autonomous vehicles in which automation can take over all driving functions under most or all circumstances. Hydra is also capable of advanced interlacing and adaptive scanning that increases effective resolution at higher frame rates. Volvo Cars gave the following technical data for Hydra for the Cirrus Dataset: "10Hz, 64 lines per frame, 1550-nm, 250m effective range, > 200 meters range to 10% reflective target (Lambertian), 120° horizontal FOV, 30° vertical FOV.". In 2020, Luminar had measured a resolution of 600,000 points per second (slide at minute 12:15).

=== Iris ===
Luminar announced a full stack platform named "Iris" in 2019 that combines Luminar's laser sensor technology and software. Iris is a plug and play installation in a vehicle. It has a range of 250 meters for small and less reflective (dark-colored) objects, or up to 500 meters for larger, brighter objects. It weighs less than two pounds and operates with a single lidar sensor integrated into the top of the windshield. The system creates a virtual, three-dimensional map of its surroundings without needing a network connection or GPS. As of January 2020, two versions of Iris are announced for release in 2022: a version that enables hands-free "freeway autonomy" and a cheaper advanced driver-assistance systems version that enables autonomous functions like emergency steering and braking. Luminar Iris has a 120° Field of View and a 26° Dynamic Vertical FoV. Originally planned resolution was 300pt/sqdeg while the data rate (points per second) is not published. However, according to the annual financial report for 2022 published in February 2023, the resolution in "points per square degree" has been reduced by 30%, to now only "more than" 200 points per square degree. The product specifications of Luminar Iris known after that SEC release in April 2023 are:

Iris lidar combines laser transmitter and receiver and provides long-range, 1550 nm sensory meeting OEM specs (...). Iris lidar sensors are dynamically configurable dual-axis scan sensors that detect objects up to 600 meters away over a horizontal field of view of 120° and a software configurable vertical field of view of up to 30°, providing high point densities in excess of 200 points per square degree enable long-range detection, tracking, and classification over the whole field of view.

On its website, the company also states for Iris "2 axis scanning mirrors with 120° x 28° FoV, scans only the laser rather than spinning the whole lidar device" as well as "An In-house custom mixed signal ASIC with better performance for significantly less cost than complex ADC chips", "Detecting dark objects at night up to 250m away", "And a maximum range of 600m". The statement "Up to 300 points per square degree", which is also given there, contradicts the publication in the annual report for the year 2022 and thus seems to be outdated. Since the resolution in points per square degree varies between 200 and 300 with a constant range for the refresh rate of 1-30 Hz, the resolution in points per second based on the resolution measured for Hydra (according Luminar presentation at minute 12:15) can be between 600,000 and 900,000 points per second.

=== Iris+ ===
On Luminar Day in February 2023, Luminar announced the successor to Iris, Iris+. According the article, Iris+ should offer a slimmer profile for more seamless integration into EV rooflines compared to its predecessor and should have already begun shipping to a “lead customer”. Iris+ should hit series production vehicle integration in 2025. Detailed specifications for Iris+ are not known (as of 01 April 2023). However, on February 28, 2023, Luminar announced the following specification changes compared to Iris (without "+"): "3X Performance (Range X Resolution), 20% Slimmer Profile". Whereby the performance classification does not allow any conclusions about the actual resolution. Based on the technical data of Hydra and Iris, this could mean a resolution between 1.8 million and 2.7 million points per second.

=== Next Gen Lidar Advanced Development ===
Also on February 28, 2023, Luminar announced the follow-up model "Halo". However, details were not announced. The obvious feature is the fundamentally changed shape. A release date was not mentioned, but only stated as "Future". The main changes to the previous products were mentioned as cost reduction, better performance, smaller size.

=== Sentinel ===
Co-developed with Volvo's Zenseact division, Sentinel is a self-driving system combining Luminar's hardware and Zenseact's "OnePilot" software that offers "proactive safety" features such as emergency braking and can receive over-the-air (OTA) updates. In 2021, Volvo announced Sentinel was expected to be a standard feature included in new versions of the Volvo XC90.

== Financials ==
In 2022, Luminar made revenues of $40.698 million, an increase from $31.944 million the previous year. Luminar has incurred net losses on an annual basis since its inception. The company incurred net losses of $445.9 million, $238.0 million and $362.3 million for the years ended December 31, 2022, 2021 and 2020, respectively. The company's SEC filings show an accumulated deficit of $1.3 billion as of December 31, 2022.

== Operations ==
Luminar has operations in the US in Orlando, Palo Alto, Detroit. Other locations are Cayman Islands, Israel, China, Germany (Munich), Hong Kong, India, Mexico, Sweden:

Subsidiaries of Luminar Technologies, Inc.
Name of Subsidiary	Jurisdiction of Organization
Luminar, LLC	Delaware
Luminar Semiconductor, Inc.	Delaware
BFE Acquisition Sub II, LLC (dba Black Forest Engineering)	Delaware
OptoGration, Inc.	Delaware
Freedom Photonics, LLC	California
Condor Acquisition Sub I, Inc.	Delaware
Condor Acquisition Sub II, Inc.	Delaware
Luminar Limited	Cayman Islands
Luminar Technologies (Shanghai) Co., Ltd.	China
Luminar GmbH	Germany
Luminar Hong Kong Limited	Hong Kong
Luminar Technology Services (India) Private Limited	India
Luminar LTC Israel Ltd.	Israel
Luminartech Mexico, S. DE R.L. DE C.V.	Mexico
Luminar Sweden AB	Sweden

== Competitors ==
Luminar's competitors include autonomous vehicle companies like Waymo and lidar companies like Aeva, AEye Inc., Cepton, Innoviz, MicroVision Inc., Ouster, Valeo, or Velodyne Lidar.

== Industry recognition ==
- Luminar's Model G 3D LiDAR received a 2018 Prism Award for Photonics Innovation presented by SPIE, the international society for optics and photonics, in the category Imaging and Cameras.
- In 2018, CNBC included Luminar in its Disruptor 50 list of innovative companies.
