= Contributor =

Contributor may refer to:

- Author, the originator of any written work which is contributed to a publication
  - Freelance writer, an author working as an independent contractor for a publication
    - Contributor network, a freelance writing arrangement used by online publications
- Benefactor (law), a person who gives some form of help to benefit a person, group or organization

The Contributor may refer to:

- The Contributor (LDS magazine), a 19th-century periodical associated with The Church of Jesus Christ of Latter-day Saints
- The Contributor (street paper), a street newspaper in Nashville, Tennessee
- The Contributor (website), an American news reporting website
