= LLN =

LLN may refer to:

- Law of large numbers, a theorem in probability and statistics
- Les Légions Noires, a group of French black metal bands
- Louvain-la-Neuve, a university city and campus of the University of Louvain, in Belgium
- Loudlabs News, a stringer company featured on Netflix's Shot in the Dark
- Lower limit of normal, the low limit of a reference range
