= Austin Russell (entrepreneur) =

American entrepreneur (born 1995)

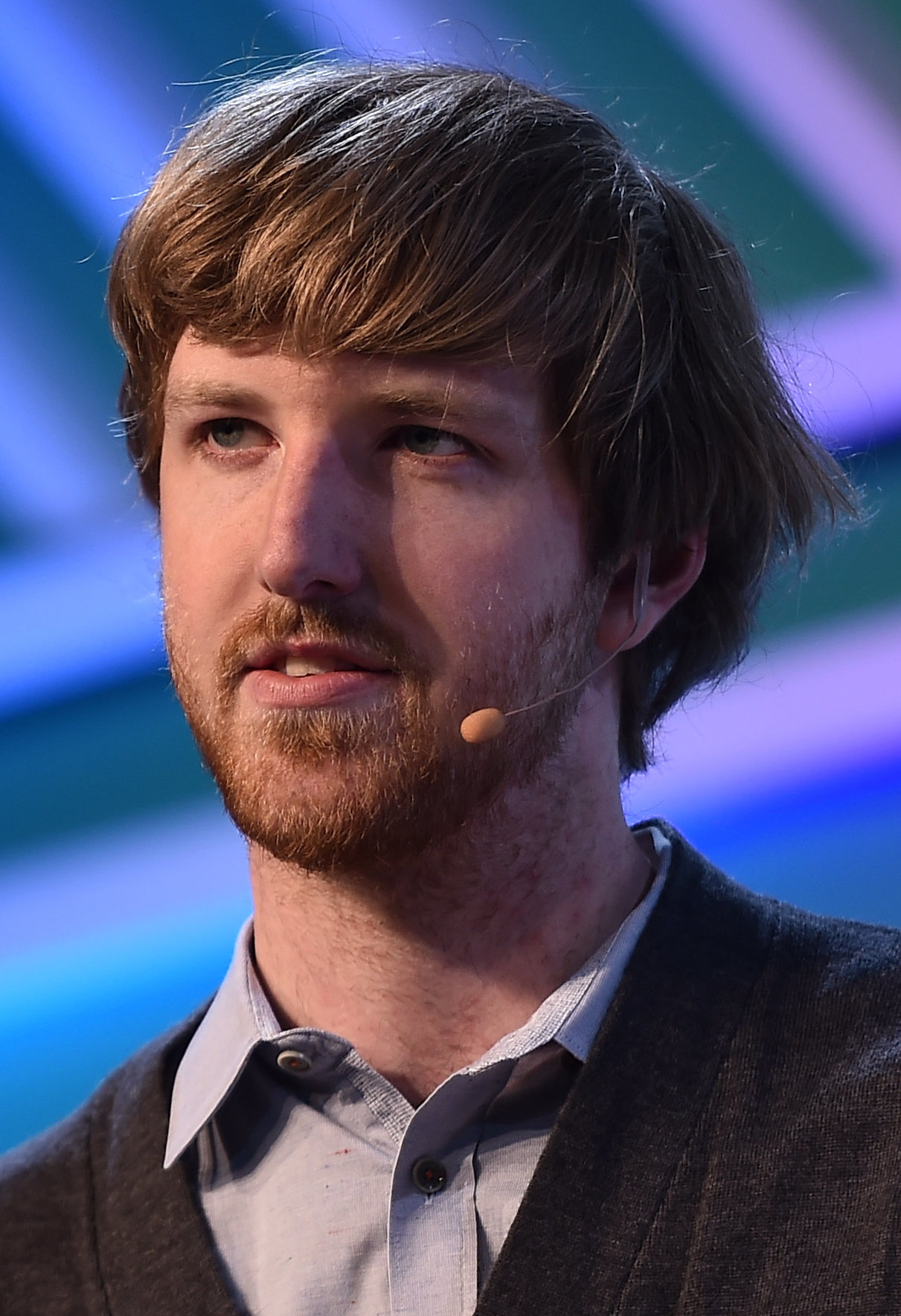
- Russell in 2018
- Born: March 14, 1995 (age 31); Newport Beach, California
- Education: Stanford University (dropped out)

Austin Russell (born March 14, 1995) is an American entrepreneur, founder and former CEO of now bankrupt Luminar Technologies. Luminar specializes in lidar and machine perception technologies, mainly used in autonomous cars. Luminar went public in December 2020, temporarily making him a billionaire, though his wealth was largely derived from stock sales executed prior to Luminar's financial collapse. In May 2023, Russell began negotiating a contract to become the majority owner of Forbes, but the deal fell through in November after Russell was unable to fund it. In December 2025, Luminar filed for Chapter 11 bankruptcy, and Russell became the subject of legal proceedings involving bankruptcy discovery obligations, a defaulted personal loan, and employment allegations. His Pacific Palisades mansion, purchased for $83 million in 2021, was destroyed in the January 2025 Palisades Fire and later declared a public nuisance.

== Early life and education ==
Russell grew up in Newport Beach, California. At age 15, Russell applied for his first patent for a groundwater recycling system to reuse water from sprinklers. When he was 15, Russell's parents introduced him to laser entrepreneur Jason Eichenholz, who became Russell's mentor and later joined Luminar as co-founder and chief technology officer.

He graduated from St. Margaret's Episcopal School in 2013. He also studied at the Beckman Laser Institute at the University of California, Irvine while in high school. Russell has said that he often teaches himself new skills from Wikipedia articles and YouTube videos.

== Luminar ==
Russell founded Luminar in 2012 while he was still in high school, shortly before turning 17. After graduating from high school, he attended Stanford University for three months, taking courses in applied physics. Russell won $100,000 from the Thiel Fellowship in 2013, leading him to drop out and focus on Luminar full-time.

The company spent its first five years in stealth mode. Rather than purchasing components, Russell engineered and manufactured Luminar's lidar components himself.

On December 3, 2020, Luminar went public, trading on the Nasdaq as LAZR. Russell's 104.7 million shares, roughly one-third of Luminar's equity, were worth $2.4 billion at the close of trading on December 3, making Russell the world's youngest self-made billionaire. He also became chairman of the company at this time. Although he is no longer a billionaire, he was the youngest ever self-made billionaire at age 25, a title he held from 2020 until 2022.

=== Stock sales ===
On July 1, 2021, Russell sold 10,500,000 shares of Luminar Technologies at $21.00 per share, generating approximately $220.5 million in proceeds. Subsequent SEC filings show a pattern of share purchases in 2022 and 2023, with Russell maintaining a beneficial ownership stake of approximately 26.9% as of May 2023.

On May 14, 2025, Luminar announced via a press release that Austin Russell resigned as President, CEO, and as the Chairperson of the Board, effective immediately. The press release also stated the resignation followed a Code of Business Conduct and Ethics inquiry by the Audit Committee of Luminar’s Board of Directors.

On December 15, 2025, Luminar declared Chapter 11 bankruptcy.

== Legal issues and bankruptcy ==
=== Luminar bankruptcy and asset sales ===
During the Chapter 11 proceedings, the company's core LiDAR assets were sold to MicroVision, Inc. for $33 million. Additionally, Luminar's semiconductor subsidiary, Luminar Semiconductor, Inc. (LSI), was sold to Quantum Computing Inc. for $110 million.

=== Subpoena and forensic imaging dispute ===
In January 2026, Luminar's legal team filed an emergency motion alleging that Russell had repeatedly evaded requests for company-owned devices and personal data needed to assess potential legal claims against him. The company alleged that Russell's personal staff misled investigators about his whereabouts during the 2025 holiday season, causing multiple failed attempts to serve a subpoena. In an email attached to the filing, a Weil, Gotshal & Manges lawyer wrote: "He is going to evade service as long as possible. In fact, he was home when your person tried last time and the guard simply lied for him."

Russell's counsel, Leonard Shulman, stated that the founder was cooperative but demanded assurances that any personal data on his devices would be protected. "The company declined, so we will follow the court-established process for data handling protections instead," Shulman told TechCrunch. Russell claimed a forensic examiner was sent to his home "unannounced" on New Year's Day "when I was asleep," and denied being uncooperative.

=== Securities class action ===
On July 23, 2025, a federal securities class action was filed against Luminar, Austin Russell, and other company executives. The complaint, brought on behalf of investors who purchased Luminar securities between March 20, 2025 and May 14, 2025, alleges that Russell violated Sections 10(b) and 20(a) of the Securities Exchange Act of 1934 and Rule 10b-5. Specifically, the complaint alleges that Russell made false and misleading statements about Luminar's business prospects while failing to disclose that he was the subject of an inquiry by the Audit Committee of the Board of Directors regarding his conduct. On May 14, 2025, Luminar announced that Russell had resigned as President, CEO, and Chairman "effective immediately, following a Code of Business Conduct and Ethics inquiry by the Audit Committee."

=== Crescent Cove loan litigation ===
On January 23, 2026, Crescent Cove Opportunity Lending LLC sued Russell in Los Angeles County Superior Court for defaulting on a personal loan. The case, number 26SMCV00415, is assigned to Judge Lisa K. Sepe-Wiesenfeld. Russell had borrowed money from Jun Hong Heng, a former Luminar director. Crescent Cove initiated foreclosure proceedings against Russell's personal trusts.

== Forbes ==
In May 2023, Russell entered into negotiations to acquire an 82 percent stake in Forbes, valuing the company at $800 million. If the transaction had proceeded, his majority stake would have included the remaining portion of the company owned by the Forbes family, which was not previously sold to Hong Kong-based investor group Integrated Whale Media. Kremlin-connected tycoon Magomed Musaev claimed to be behind the attempted purchase, suggesting a variety of motives, including the intent to conceal his involvement. In November 2023, it was revealed the deal had collapsed due to Russell’s failure to secure the necessary funds.

== Philanthropy ==
On January 1, 2022, Russell donated $4 million to Team Seas, allowing the fundraiser to reach its goal of $30 million raised. In 2021, he donated $70 million to the Central Florida Foundation, ranking him among the top 50 philanthropists globally, that year.

== Recognition ==
- In 2017, MIT Technology Review named Russell an "Innovator Under 35".
- In 2018, Forbes named Russell to its "30 Under 30" list for founding and leading Luminar.
- Russell appeared on the Fortune magazine 40 Under 40 list in 2021.
- Motor Trend ranked Russell #41 on its 2022 Power List.

== Personal life and assets ==
=== Real estate ===
In July 2021, Russell purchased a six-bedroom, 18-bathroom mansion at 1601 San Onofre Drive in Pacific Palisades, California, for $83 million, the most expensive property ever purchased in Pacific Palisades at the time. The home was featured in the fourth season of the HBO series "Succession" as the luxury estate of the fictional Roy family. The property was built in 2020 by developer Ardie Tavangarian and was once owned by magazine magnate William Randolph Hearst.

The mansion was destroyed in the January 2025 Palisades Fire. In October 2025, the property was declared a public nuisance by the Los Angeles Board of Building and Safety Commissioners, with city officials stating that the owner had failed to meet the October 2, 2025, deadline to clear hazardous fire debris.

According to Jon Mansfield, a representative for the owner, Russell had initially withdrawn from the federal debris removal program over concerns that government contractors would not adequately preserve "millions of dollars of building materials." After learning that private debris cleanup would cost between $500,000 and $600,000, Russell changed his mind but was unable to re-register. The property subsequently entered pre-foreclosure.

=== Vehicles ===
In February 2026, a McLaren Elva previously owned by Russell appeared at a salvage auction following a collision. The vehicle, a 1 of 149 limited production supercar with a new value of approximately $2 million, sustained front-end damage and damage to its Active Air Management System.
