= Ouster =

Ouster may refer to:

- Ouster (company), a US-based lidar technology company founded in 2015
- Ouster clause, a function removing judicial review of legislation
- Ousters, characters in Dan Simmons' series of Hyperion novels
- A cause of action available to one who is refused access to their concurrent estate
