= David Hall (American businessman) =

American businessman, engineer, and inventor

- Born: 1951 (age 74–75); Connecticut, U.S.
- Occupations: Engineer; Inventor; Entrepreneur
- Known for: Founding Velodyne Acoustics; Founding Velodyne Lidar; Development of LIDAR technology for autonomous vehicles
- Spouse: Marta Thoma Hall

David Hall (born 1951) is an American billionaire businessman, engineer, and inventor. He is widely recognized for his involvement in LIDAR technology for self-driving cars, having founded Velodyne Lidar. Hall's sensor designs have been used in robotics, mapping, industrial automation, and advanced navigation systems.

== Career ==
=== Audio technology and Velodyne Acoustics ===
In 1979, Hall founded Velodyne in California, aided by a $250,000 loan from his grandfather. The name "Velodyne" was inspired by his passion for bicycle racing. During its initial years, the company focused on designing and manufacturing innovative audio equipment, especially subwoofers known for precise, low-distortion performance.

A landmark achievement for Velodyne came in 1983 when Hall patented the accelerometer-based High Gain Servo Speaker System. This technology measured the speaker cone's movement in real time and corrected for distortion, bolstering Velodyne's standing among high-end audio equipment manufacturers.

==== Audio innovations ====
Velodyne's first notable product, the ULD-18 subwoofer, employed piezoelectric accelerometer technology, continuously monitoring and adjusting speaker cone movement to diminish distortion. Over the years, the company broadened its lineup to encompass seven distinct speaker series, ranging from mainstream offerings to high-end audiophile systems. Notably, the 1812 subwoofer—priced at $25,000—became a hallmark of the company's commitment to pushing technical boundaries in audio.

=== Transition to robotics and LIDAR ===
By the mid-1990s, Hall expanded his interests to other technical areas, exploring semiconductor technology, robotics, and related fields. He also took part in Robot Wars competitions, gaining practical insights into sensor technology and machine automation.

A defining moment came in 2004, when Hall joined the inaugural DARPA Grand Challenge with an autonomous truck. Initially relying on stereo cameras, he soon focused on LIDAR after discussing navigation methods with other competitors. By 2005, he had developed a rotating LIDAR system capable of generating a comprehensive 360-degree environmental scan.

=== Velodyne LIDAR ===
Hall filed a patent in 2007 for a LIDAR design featuring 64 lasers in a rotating housing spinning at up to 900 revolutions per minute. This approach allowed autonomous systems to map and detect their surroundings in real time without depending solely on GPS. Although the sensor initially cost around $80,000, it attracted considerable attention during the DARPA Challenges and soon became a prominent option in the self-driving sector.

==== Market adoption and growth ====
As interest in autonomous vehicles surged, Velodyne LIDAR devices were used by entities such as Google's Waymo, Uber, and Apple, prompting the company's rapid expansion. Velodyne's staff grew to more than 400 employees, and strategic investments from Ford and Baidu helped secure its position in the market. Hall himself benefited financially from the increasing demand for LIDAR technology.

=== Marine technology and Servo Yachts ===
In 2011, Hall turned his attention to marine engineering by founding Servo Yachts LLC. The firm's primary focus has been the development of self-stabilizing vessels featuring active suspension to counteract waves and reduce motion sickness. A demonstration craft, called the "Martini 1.5," was featured at several boat shows, including the 2013 Miami Boat Show, and has been tested on the San Francisco Bay.

=== Space technology ventures ===
Hall continued to broaden his range of interests by founding Shoot the Moon Rocket Technologies Inc. in 2021, located in Alameda, California. The company is exploring electric and magnetic propulsion, aiming to innovate rocket technologies and advance space travel.

== Innovation and recognition ==
Hall holds more than 75 U.S. patents, primarily revolving around sensor technologies and lidar systems. In 2018, he received the "Inventor of the Year" award from the Intellectual Property Owners Education Foundation for his work in autonomous vehicle technology.

== Leadership philosophy and management approach ==
He uses his talent to push the limits of technology. According to Hall, he spends 80% of his management time in engineering and production. He has also emphasized the importance of an innovative production line, claiming that producing an innovative product beyond a prototype is among the greatest challenges.

=== Innovation philosophy ===
Hall starts with what he considers an unfulfilled need in the world. He added quality deep bass to sound in the acoustics industry to make Velodyne Acoustics a success. He discovered a way for vehicles to "See in 3D" by inventing the use of lidar for autonomous driving.

His approach to innovation combines direct experimentation with an openness to unorthodox solutions. His cross-industry success—from audio systems to autonomous navigation—illustrates a pattern of identifying technological gaps and developing practical engineering solutions. This method was apparent in his pivot from servo-based audio designs to building advanced lidar systems, driven by his familiarity with precision mechanical components.

== Legacy and impact ==
Hall's focus on technological innovation, product development, and creative marketing has driven success across multiple industries. His early achievements in servo-controlled audio helped shape high-fidelity sound systems and influenced the global speaker industry. His invention of lidar technology accelerated its worldwide adoption in autonomous vehicles, robotics, security systems, and smart city applications. The success of Velodyne Lidar underscored the critical role of advanced sensors in various sectors, highlighting Hall's significant contribution to advancing multiple innovations.

While leading Velodyne Lidar Inc., Hall advocated for using autonomous vehicle technology for improved vehicle safety, including pedestrian and cyclist detection at night. He suggested that as vehicles prove safe and save lives, more technological advancements could be integrated to further reduce road hazards.

Hall is married to Marta Thoma Hall, an artist and businesswoman who served as President of Velodyne Acoustics, Inc. in 2008, and President of Velodyne Lidar Inc. from 2015 to 2020. David and Marta Hall founded the Hall Art and Technology Foundation in 2022 as a non-profit (501(c)) community-engaged organization to promote the arts and clean technology, with exhibitions on the Alameda Floating Museum. The Floating Museum is located at the Stone Boatyard in Alameda, California, and is open to the public on specified hours.
