= Stringr =

American company

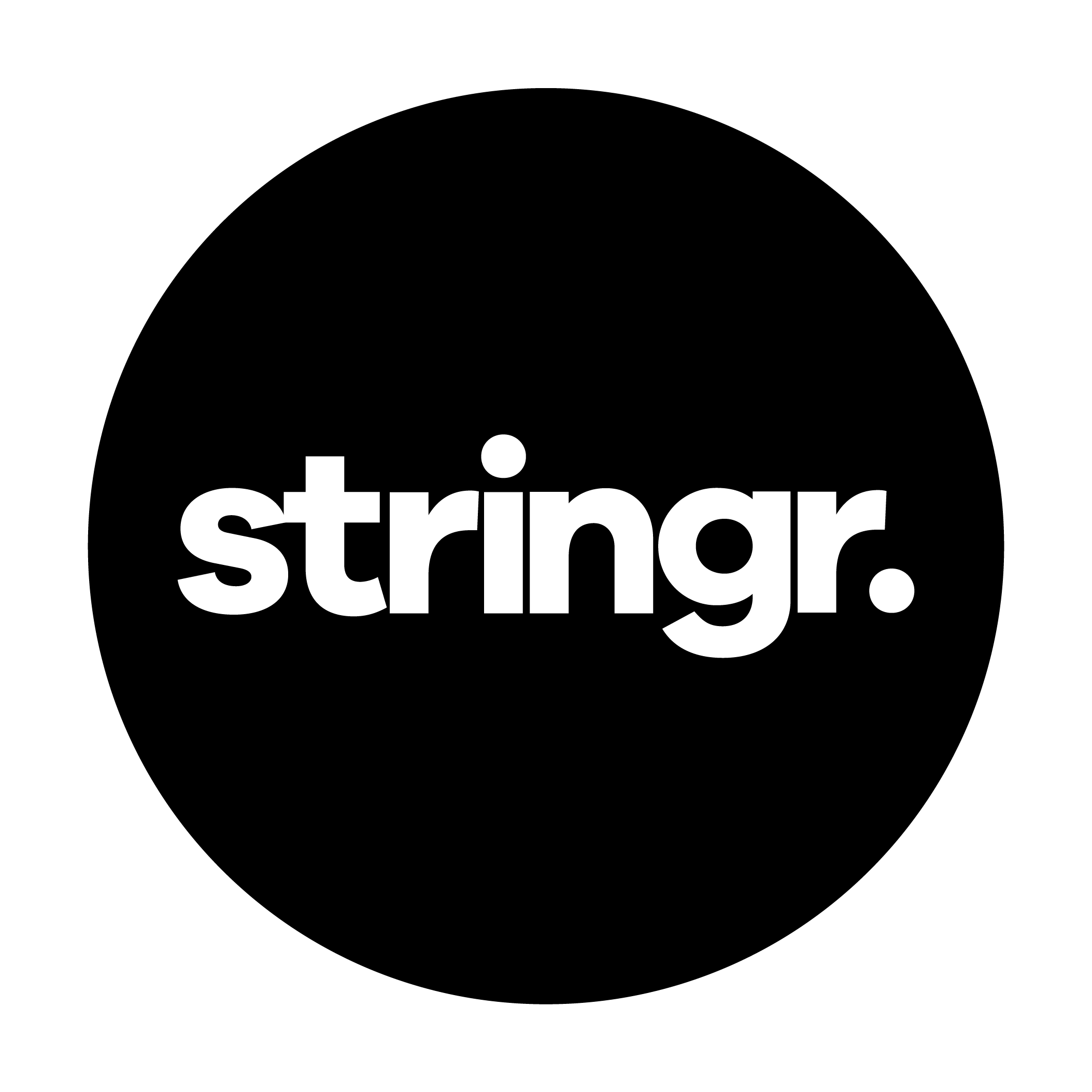
- Company type: Private
- Industry: Videography
- Founded: 2013
- Founders: Lindsay Stewart (CEO); Brian McNeill (COO)
- Headquarters: New York, United States
- Products: Freelance videographer marketplace
- Website: stringr.com

Stringr is an American videography digital marketplace company linking media organizations and freelance videographers (or stringers) based in New York City. Stringr's product WeatherGen, is an on-demand AI-powered weather forecast video generator which transforms the way weather reports are produced.

== History ==
Stringr was founded in November 2013 by Wharton graduates Lindsay Stewart (CEO) and Brian McNeill (COO). It was developed as part of the San Francisco-based startup accelerator, Matter. By September 2014, the company had raised $550,000 from various angel investors. Stringr's mobile app initially launched in San Diego and was in 10 markets by March 2015.

In December 2015, the company raised $1.5 million in a funding round led by Matter, Signia Ventures, and Founder.org. By July 2016, the platform was available in 200 U.S. markets with several media partners, including The Washington Post and Associated Press. In October 2018, Stringr closed a $1-million funding round led by the Associated Press, McClatchy, Advection Growth Capital, and G5 Capital, bringing its total funding to $4.6 million. In April 2019, it introduced a live streaming feature, and the following month, the service was launched in the United Kingdom. In June 2019, the company integrated with TVU Networks for live coverage. In August 2019, Stringr partnered with Reuters, an international news organization. This integration lets Reuters Connect clients utilize Stringr's collection of video, as well as video editing services. In May 2020, Stringr raised an additional $5.75 million from Thomson Reuters, as well as G5 Capital and Advection Growth Capital, to total their funding at $7.25 million.
