= Marta Thoma Hall =

American painter and sculptor

- Born: 1951 (age 74–75); Lincoln, Nebraska
- Education: University of California, Berkeley (B.A. in Fine Arts); San Francisco State University
- Occupations: Painter; Sculptor; Business Executive; Philanthropist
- Known for: Surreal artworks, Public art installations, Leadership in technology sector, Founder of World Safety Summit for Autonomous Vehicles
- Notable work: "Go Mama", "Brainworks", "Journey in A Bottle", "Earth Tear"

Marta Thoma Hall (born 1951, Lincoln, Nebraska) is an American painter, sculptor, business executive, and philanthropist known for her surrealist-inspired imagery and innovative use of recycled materials in large-scale public sculptures that advocate for environmental stewardship, as well as her leadership in the technology sector and her work in promoting autonomous vehicle safety.

== Early life and education ==
Marta Thoma Hall was born in Lincoln, Nebraska, in 1951. After moving to Northern California with her family, she pursued higher education in California, earning a Bachelor of Arts in Fine Arts from the University of California, Berkeley and furthering her studies at San Francisco State University.

== Artistic career ==
Based in the San Francisco Bay Area and Kauaʻi, Hawaii, Hall developed her artistic practice with influences from European surrealism and environmental themes. Her work has been exhibited across the United States and internationally, and she is noted for incorporating recycled materials into her sculptures and installations. For example, her work "Earth Tear" (1995) was created during her NORCAL Artist in Residence at the San Francisco Sanitary Fill Company, marking an early foray into ecological art.

Hall has created several notable public art installations:

- Go Mama, a sculpture commissioned by the City of Palo Alto.
- Brainworks, an interactive solar-powered sculpture in San Jose, California.
- Journey in A Bottle, a suspended sculpture commissioned by the Walnut Creek Main Library, featuring discarded glass bottles arranged to resemble a giant tidal wave.

In 2022, Hall collaborated with artist Jeni Lila to establish "Watchery" at the Stone Boatyard Art Studio in Alameda, California. The project challenges traditional art history by repurposing high-quality reproductions of famous paintings, with the "Rising Tides" series addressing global warming and ocean pollution.

Hall integrates digital technology with traditional art techniques, employing 3D modeling software alongside sculpting methods to create her works.

== Business career ==
In addition to her artistic practice, Hall has maintained a significant presence in the technology sector. She served as Vice President of Marketing for Velodyne Acoustics, Inc. from 2009 to 2010. She then served as President of Velodyne Acoustics LLC from 2010 to 2016. Following the spin-off of Velodyne Lidar as an independent company in December 2015, she served as President of Velodyne Lidar Inc. from 2016 to 2020. She was still identified as President of Velodyne Lidar in 2022. Since January 2020, she has also served on Velodyne's board of directors.

Her leadership at Velodyne was marked by the integration of artistic design with technological innovation, contributing to product development and the advancement of LiDAR technology in autonomous vehicles. Hall also helped steer the company's expansion into consumer electronics by overseeing projects that blended aesthetic design with functional engineering.

In 2016, Thoma Hall founded the World Safety Summit for Autonomous Vehicles. As President of Velodyne Lidar, she organized this annual summit from 2016 to 2020, bringing together business, government, public safety, and community leaders to discuss the safe development and deployment of autonomous technology. The summit agenda included sessions examining topics such as the AV testing process, how to address confusing terminology related to vehicle autonomy and safety, education and public engagement, and cybersecurity. The 2019 summit was held at Levi Stadium in Santa Clara, California.

She is a member of the National Leadership Board for the Berkeley Art Museum and Pacific Film Archive (BAMPFA).
