= Forbes =

American business magazine

- Cover of the issue from December 20, 2010, featuring WikiLeaks founder Julian Assange
- Chairman / Editor-in-chief: Steve Forbes
- Executive Editor: Kerry Lauerman
- Categories: Business magazine
- Frequency: Twice quarterly
- Publisher: Forbes Media
- Total circulation: 514,184 (2023)
- Founder: B. C. Forbes
- First issue: September 15, 1917; 109 years ago
- Company: Integrated Whale Media Investments
- Country: United States
- Based in: Jersey City, New Jersey, U.S.
- Language: English
- Website: forbes.com
- ISSN: 0015-6914
- OCLC: 6465733

Forbes (Note: Pronunciation: /fɔːrbz/) is an American business magazine founded by B. C. Forbes in 1917. It has been owned by the Hong Kong-based investment group Integrated Whale Media Investments since 2014. Its chairman and editor-in-chief is Steve Forbes and its CEO is Sherry Phillips. The company is headquartered in Jersey City, New Jersey.

Published eight times per year, Forbes features articles on finance, industry, investing, and marketing topics. It also reports on related subjects such as technology, communications, science, politics, and law. It has an international edition in Asia as well as editions produced under license in 27 countries and regions worldwide. The magazine is known for its lists and rankings, including its lists of the richest Americans (the Forbes 400), of 30 notable people under the age of 30 (the Forbes 30 Under 30), of America's wealthiest celebrities, of the world's top companies (the Forbes Global 2000), of the world's most powerful people, and of the world's billionaires.

Since 2010, the Forbes.com website has become increasingly reliant on freelance contributor network writers who have limited editorial oversight from the publication, the quality of which has been criticised and described as enabling "pay-to-play journalism".

== Company history ==
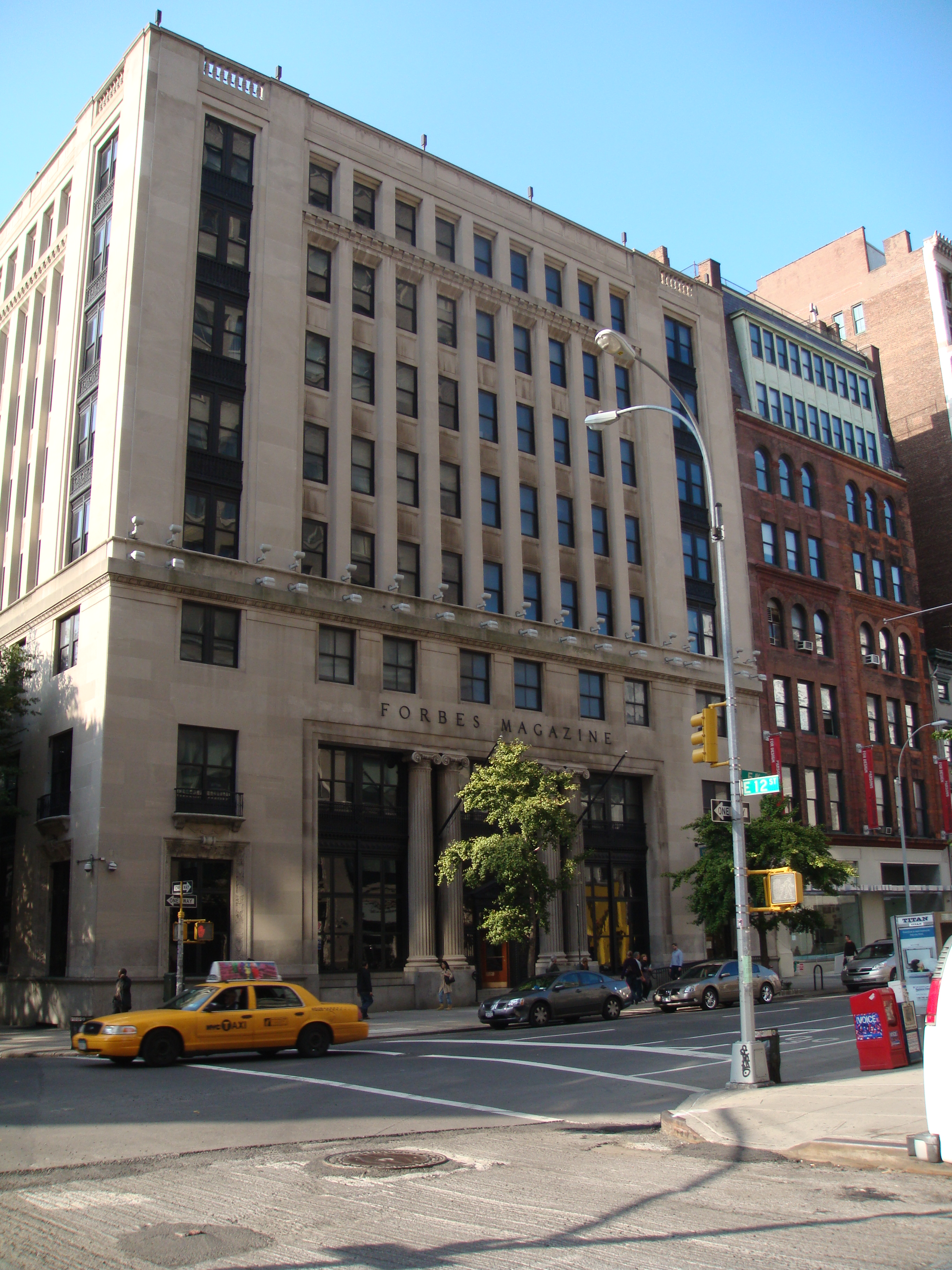
Forbes Building on Fifth Avenue in New York City, the former headquarters of Forbes in Manhattan (now owned by New York University)

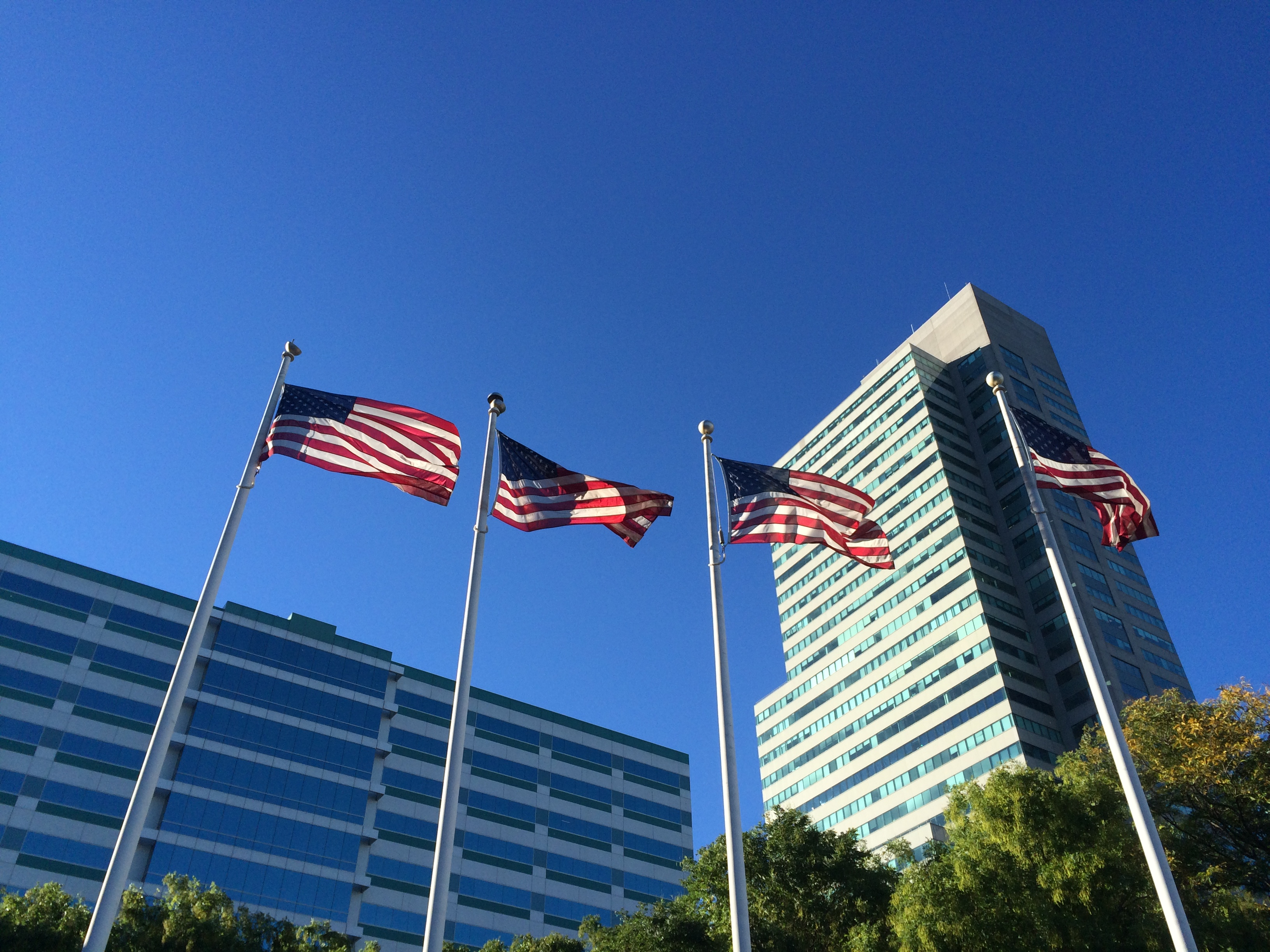
Forbes Media headquarters at 499 Washington Blvd, Jersey City since 2014

B. C. Forbes, a financial columnist for the Hearst papers, and his partner Walter Drey, the general manager of the Magazine of Wall Street, founded Forbes magazine on September 15, 1917. Forbes provided the money and the name and Drey provided the publishing expertise. The original name of the magazine was Forbes: Devoted to Doers and Doings. Drey became vice-president of the B.C. Forbes Publishing Company, while B.C. Forbes became editor-in-chief, a post he held until his death in 1954. B.C. Forbes was assisted in his later years by his two eldest sons, Bruce Charles Forbes (1916–1964) and Malcolm Forbes (1919–1990).

Bruce Forbes took over after his father's death, and his strengths lay in streamlining operations and developing marketing. During his tenure, from 1954 to 1964, the magazine's circulation nearly doubled.

On Bruce's death, his brother Malcolm Forbes became president and chief executive officer of Forbes, and editor-in-chief of Forbes magazine. Between 1961 and 1999 the magazine was edited by James Michaels. In 1993, under Michaels, Forbes was a finalist for the National Magazine Award. In 2006, an investment group Elevation Partners that includes rock star Bono bought a minority interest in the company with a reorganization, through a new company, Forbes Media LLC, in which Forbes Magazine and Forbes.com, along with other media properties, is now a part. A 2009 New York Times report said: "40 percent of the enterprise was sold... for a reported $300 million, setting the value of the enterprise at $750 million." Three years later, Mark M. Edmiston of AdMedia Partners observed, "It's probably not worth half of that now." It was later revealed that the price had been US$264 million.

In 2021, Forbes Media reported a return to profit, with revenue increasing by 34 percent to $165 million. Much of the revenue growth was attributed to Forbes' consumer business, which was up 83 percent year-over-year. CEO Mike Federle says that Forbes is built on an audience and business scale with 150 million consumers.

=== Sale of headquarters ===
In January 2010, Forbes reached an agreement to sell its headquarters building on Fifth Avenue in Manhattan to New York University; terms of the deal were not publicly reported, but Forbes was to continue to occupy the space under a five-year sale-leaseback arrangement. The company's headquarters moved to the Newport section of downtown Jersey City, New Jersey, in 2014.

=== Sale to Integrated Whale Media (51% stake) ===
In November 2013, Forbes Media, which publishes Forbes magazine, was put up for sale. This was encouraged by minority shareholders Elevation Partners. Sale documents prepared by Deutsche Bank revealed that the publisher's 2012 earnings before interest, taxes, depreciation, and amortization was US$15 million. Forbes reportedly sought a price of US$400 million. In July 2014, the Forbes family bought out Elevation and then Hong Kong-based investment group Integrated Whale Media Investments purchased a 51 percent majority of the company.

In 2017, Isaac Stone Fish, a senior fellow of the Asia Society, wrote in The Washington Post that "Since that purchase, there have been several instances of editorial meddling on stories involving China that raise questions about Forbes magazine's commitment to editorial independence."

=== Failed SPAC merger and sale ===
On August 26, 2021, Forbes announced plans to go public via a merger with a special-purpose acquisition company called Magnum Opus Acquisition, and to trade on the New York Stock Exchange as FRBS. In February 2022, it was announced that Cryptocurrency exchange Binance would acquire a $200 million stake in Forbes as a result of the SPAC flotation. In June 2022, the company terminated its SPAC merger citing unfavorable market conditions.

In August 2022, the company announced that it was exploring a sale of its business. In May 2023, it was announced that billionaire Austin Russell, founder of Luminar Technologies, agreed to acquire an 82 percent stake in a deal valuing the company at $800 million. His majority ownership was to include the remaining portion of the company owned by the Forbes family which was not previously sold to Integrated Whale Media. The transaction attracted scrutiny by the Committee on Foreign Investment in the United States. Russell denied reports that Russian businessman Magomed Musaev was involved in the transaction. In November 2023, the deal collapsed, as Russell was unable to put together the necessary funds.

== Other publications ==
Apart from Forbes and its lifestyle supplements, Forbes Life, the magazine has 42 international editions covering 69 countries:

- Forbes Africa
- Forbes Afrique (Francophone Africa)
- Forbes África Lusófona (Lusophone Africa)
- Forbes Argentina
- Forbes Australia
- Forbes Austria
- Forbes Belgium
- Forbes Brazil
- Forbes Bulgaria
- Forbes Central America
- Forbes Chile
- Forbes China
- Forbes Colombia
- Forbes Cyprus
- Forbes Czech Republic
- Forbes Dominican Republic
- Forbes Ecuador
- Forbes En Español
- Forbes España (Spain)
- Forbes France
- Forbes Georgia
- Forbes Greece
- Forbes Hungary
- Forbes India
- Forbes Israel
- Forbes Italy
- Forbes Japan
- Forbes Kazakhstan
- Forbes Korea
- Forbes Mexico
- Forbes Middle East
- Forbes Paraguay
- Forbes Peru
- Forbes Poland
- Forbes Portugal
- Forbes Romania
- Forbes Slovensko (Slovakia)
- Forbes Slovenia
- Forbes Srbija (Serbia)
- Forbes Switzerland
- Forbes Thailand
- Forbes Ukraine
- Forbes Uruguay
- Forbes Vietnam

=== Ceased publication ===
- Forbes Baltic
- Forbes Estonia
- Forbes Indonesia
- Forbes Latvia
- Forbes Lithuania
- Forbes Monaco
- Forbes Russia

Chairman / Editor-in-chief Steve Forbes and his magazine's writers offer investment advice on the weekly Fox TV show Forbes on Fox and on Forbes on Radio. Other company groups include Forbes Conference Group, Forbes Investment Advisory Group and Forbes Custom Media. From the 2009 Times report: "Steve Forbes recently returned from opening up a Forbes magazine in India, bringing the number of foreign editions to 10." In addition, that year the company began publishing ForbesWoman, a quarterly magazine published by Steve Forbes's daughter, Moira Forbes, with a companion Web site.

The company formerly published American Legacy magazine as a joint venture, although that magazine separated from Forbes on May 14, 2007.

The company also formerly published American Heritage and Invention & Technology magazines. After failing to find a buyer, Forbes suspended publication of these two magazines as of May 17, 2007. Both magazines were purchased by the American Heritage Publishing Company and resumed publication as of the spring of 2008. Forbes has published the Forbes Travel Guide since 2009.

In 2013, Forbes licensed its brand to Ashford University, and assisted with the launch of the Forbes School of Business & Technology. CEO Mike Federle justified the licensing in 2018, stating that "Our licensing business is almost a pure-profit business, because it's an annual annuity." Forbes would launch limited promotions for the school in limited issues. Forbes has never formally endorsed the school.

On January 6, 2014, Forbes magazine announced that, in partnership with app creator Maz, it was launching a social networking app called "Stream". Stream allows Forbes readers to save and share visual content with other readers and discover content from Forbes magazine and Forbes.com within the app.

== Forbes.com ==
David Churbuck founded Forbes's web site in 1996. The site uncovered Stephen Glass's journalistic fraud in The New Republic in 1998, an article that drew attention to internet journalism. At the peak of media coverage of alleged Toyota sudden unintended acceleration in 2010, it exposed the California "runaway Prius" as a hoax, as well as running five other articles by Michael Fumento challenging the entire media premise of Toyota's cars gone bad. The website (like the magazine) publishes lists focusing on billionaires and their possessions, especially real estate.

Forbes.com is part of Forbes Digital, a division of Forbes Media LLC. Forbes's holdings include a portion of RealClearPolitics. Together these sites reach more than 27 million unique visitors each month. Forbes.com employs the slogan "Home Page for the World's Business Leaders" and claimed, in 2006, to be the world's most widely visited business web site. The 2009 Times report said that, while "one of the top five financial sites by traffic [throwing] off an estimated $70 million to $80 million a year in revenue, [it] never yielded the hoped-for public offering".

Forbes.com uses a contributor network in which a wide network of freelancers ("contributors") writes and publishes articles directly on the website. Contributors are paid based on traffic to their respective Forbes.com pages; the site has received contributions from over 2,500 individuals, and some contributors have earned over US$100,000, according to the company. The contributor system has been criticized for enabling "pay-to-play journalism" and the repackaging of public relations material as news. Forbes currently allows advertisers to publish blog posts on its website alongside regular editorial content through a program called BrandVoice, which accounts for more than 10 percent of its digital revenue. In July 2018, Forbes deleted an article by a contributor who argued that libraries should be closed and that Amazon should open bookstores in their place.

As of 2019, the company published 100 articles each day, produced by 3,000 outside contributors who were paid little or nothing. This business model, in place since 2010, "changed their reputation from being a respectable business publication to a content farm", according to Damon Kiesow, the Knight Chair in digital editing and producing at the University of Missouri School of Journalism. Similarly, Harvard University's Nieman Lab deemed Forbes "a platform for scams, grift, and bad journalism" as of 2022.

In 2017, the website blocked internet users using ad blocking software from accessing articles, requiring that the website be put on the ad blocking software's whitelist before access was granted. Forbes argued that this is done because customers using ad blocking software do not contribute to the site's revenue. Malware attacks have been noted to occur from the Forbes site.

Forbes won the 2020 Webby People's Voice Award for Business Blog/Website.

== Forbes8 ==
In November 2019, Forbes launched a streaming platform Forbes8, highlighting notable entrepreneurs and sharing business tips. In 2020, the network announced the release of several documentary series including Forbes Rap Mentors, Driven Against the Odds, Indie Nation and Titans on the Rocks.

== See also ==
- Forbes 30 Under 30
- Forbes 400
- Forbes 500
- Forbes Global 2000
- The World's Billionaires
- World's 100 Most Powerful Women
- World's Most Powerful People
- List of centibillionaires
