= Aeva =

American multinational technology company

Aeva, Inc.
- Type: Public
- Traded as: NYSE: AEVA
- Industry: Automotive industry; LiDAR; Automation
- Founded: December 5, 2016; 9 years ago in Mountain View, California, United States
- Founders: Soroush Salehian; Mina Rezk
- Headquarters: Mountain View, California, U.S.
- Area served: Worldwide
- Key people: Soroush Salehian (CEO), Mina Rezk (CTO), Saurabh Sinha (CFO)
- Products: Aeries I, Aeries II, Atlas
- Number of employees: c. 300 (2023)
- Website: aeva.com

Aeva Technologies, Inc. (NYSE: AEVA) is a publicly traded American corporation specializing in sensing hardware and perception software, including LiDAR, headquartered in Mountain View, California. Aeva makes sensing and perception tools for vehicular automation, metrology, and industrial automation.

== History ==
Aeva was founded in 2016 by entrepreneurs Soroush Salehian and Mina Rezk, who previously worked in Apple's Special Projects Group and at Nikon. Following a $3.5 million seed round in 2017, the company came out of stealth mode and raised a subsequent $45 million Series A from Lux Capital and Canaan Partners. The company then raised a corporate round from strategic investors including Porsche SE, and Lockheed Martin. In 2021, Aeva merged with InterPrivate Acquisition Corp. to raise over $560 million and trade publicly on the NYSE under the ticker symbol, AEVA. Aeva also announced a $145 million capital raise with existing long-term stockholders in 2023. To date, Aeva is the only LiDAR company that Porsche SE has invested in.

In 2021, Aeva chose Fabrinet as its contract manufacturer to produce its CoreVision "LiDAR-on-Chip" modules.

In that year, Nikon was Aeva's first industrial metrology customer, and TuSimple completed the industry's first fully autonomous drive using Aeva's sensor.

In 2022, Aeva was the first 4D LiDAR company enabled on Nvidia Drive autonomous-vehicle platform. In 2022, NASA enlisted Aeva's technology to help astronauts map and navigate the moon for upcoming Artemis missions. The company also signed with SICK AG to provide its 4D LiDAR technology to industrial automation equipment.

In 2023, Railergy signed on to use Aeva's technology to help automate Deutsche Bahn Cargo's locomotives by identifying obstructions on and around rails. Also in 2023, May Mobility selected Aeva's technology for its next-generation Toyota Sienna autonomous transit vehicles, supplying multiple sensors per vehicle for thousands of May Mobility vehicles through 2028.

In 2024, Daimler Truck and its subsidiary Torc Robotics announced the selection of Aeva's 4D LiDAR technology for its autonomous vehicle program, which begins production in 2026 with autonomous Freightliner Cascadia trucks sold for use on U.S. roads in 2027.

=== Technology ===
Aeva develops what it describes as "4D LiDAR" using Frequency Modulated Continuous Wave (FMCW) technology to detect 3D position and instant velocity for every point simultaneously. Unlike conventional "Time of Flight", or 3D LiDAR, which measures depth and reflectivity, Aeva's 4D LiDAR uses a continuous, low-power laser beam to measure the change in frequency of the wave as it reflects on an object to detect velocity in addition to reflectivity and depth.

Aeva's technology is the first to simultaneously achieve high resolution (up to 4 million points per second) at long ranges. It has a maximum detection range of 500 meters, can detect pedestrians and bicycles beyond 350 meters, and ground drivable regions beyond 200 meters.

Aeva's technology is free from interference from other LiDAR sensors and sunlight. It is designed to enable autonomous vehicles to see with higher resolution at distances around 500 meters.

Aeva developed "LiDAR-on-Chip" technology, using silicon photonics that integrates the core optical components into a module capable of being produced in high volumes, in contrast to other long-range LiDAR that uses fiber optic lasers and components that are difficult to mass-produce.

Aeva developed X1 "System-on-Chip" processor technology, known as an application-specific integrated circuit, that integrates data acquisition, point-cloud processing, scanning, and application software in a single, mixed-signal chip.

Aeva's technology comes to centimeter-level accuracy at hundreds of meters of range for automotive applications and micron-level accuracy at tens of meters for industrial metrology applications.

=== Products ===
==== Aeries I ====
Aeries I (a-sample), with a 120-degree field-of-view, was unveiled at CES 2020 and was used for development and testing by Audi's Autonomous Intelligent Driving (AID) division as well as commercial autonomous trucking pioneers TuSimple and Plus.

==== Aeries II ====
In February 2022, Aeva released Aeries II (b-sample) as its first 4D LiDAR sensor with a 120-degree field-of-view using its "LiDAR-on-Chip" technology. Aeries II was 75% smaller than its predecessor, allowing a wider range of sensor integration points in automotive and non-automotive applications and designed for automotive-grade reliability requirements. The sensor was the first to use Ultra Resolution, a feature delivering real-time camera-level images with no motion blur, providing up to 20 times the resolution of conventional LiDAR sensors.

==== Atlas ====
In 2023, Aeva released Atlas (c-sample) at CES 2024 as its mass-production intent sensor. Atlas is 70% smaller than Aeries II, made possible by Aeva's innovations in custom silicon technology, including the Aeva CoreVision fourth generation "LiDAR-on-Chip" module and Aeva X1, a powerful "System-on-Chip" LiDAR processor. Daimler Truck was also announced as the first customer of Atlas in a $1B agreement.

=== Operations ===
Aeva is headquartered in Mountain View, California, and has operations in Milpitas, California. Other operations are in New York, China, Germany, India, and Thailand.

=== Industry Recognition ===
- Time Magazine Best Invention of 2022 (Aeries II 4D LiDAR)
- CES 2023 Innovation Award Honoree (Aeries II 4D LiDAR)

Reuters Automotive D.R.I.V.E 2023 Innovation Honours Shortlist

- AutoTech Breakthrough Awards - Overall Auto Sensor Company of the Year 2021 & 2022

== See also ==
- LiDAR
- Luminar Technologies
