= Magomed Musaev (businessman) =

Russian businessman

- Born: 13 June 1963 (age 63); Tlyarosh, Dagestan ASSR, Russian SFSR, Soviet Union
- Known for: Entrepreneur; venture capitalist
- Spouse: Zaira Abdulatipova
- Children: 3

Magomed Khalilulayevich Musaev (Russian: Магомед Халилулаевич Мусаев; born 13 June 1963) is an international entrepreneur, venture capitalist and impact investor, philanthropist, founder and president of the Global Venture Alliance (GVA) investment fund, creator of the Sapiens Impact global impact community, one of the founders of the ImpactFuture investment company.

== Career ==
Musaev was born June 13, 1963 in Tlyarosh, Charodinsky district, Dagestan ASSR, USSR.

He graduated from Dagestan State Medical University, I.M. Sechenov First Moscow State Medical University (PhD), Higher School of Privatization and Entrepreneurship, Plekhanov Russian University of Economics.

Between 2004 and 2009 Musaev was retrieving the position of General Director of the All-Russian Exhibition Center (VVC), was the head of the Directorate and Executive Secretary of the National Organizing Committee for the Promotion of the candidacy of the Russian Federation as the organizer of EXPO-2010, and later worked in the Moscow government. In 2009, he was fired due to the owner’s dissatisfied with the financial results of Musaev's work. An inspection by the Prosecutor General's Office was initiated. The inspection concentrated on the allegations that part of the rental income of exhibition premises was transferred to the account of the All-Russian Exhibition Center "not quite legally or not received at all".

In 2011, Magomed Musaev founded and headed the Global Venture Alliance (GVA), which implements projects in the field of corporate innovation, startup acceleration, venture fund management and operates in more than 20 countries, including implementing projects in Silicon Valley.

In August 2018, Magomed Musaev purchased the Russian version of Forbes, in 2021 Business Insight Media, owned by the family of Magomed Musaev, signed a license agreement with Harvard Business School Publishing to bring out the digital type of the Russian version of the Harvard Business Review (HBR) magazine.

According to political expert Eduard Urazaev, Magomed Musaev's decision to buy the Russian edition of the Forbes magazine was driven by political rather than business interests as leverage against alleged law enforcement inquests into his father-in-law Ramazan Abdulatipov.

In 2020 Magomed Musaev created Sapiens Impact as a global impact community aimed to amass and deploy $1 trillion worth of capital to address global challenges. In 2021, Magomed Musaev and his partners announced the creation of the ImpactFuture investment company, a platform investing in the development and implementation of innovative solutions to large-scale social problems.

== Personal life ==
His wife is Zaira Abdulatipova. They have three children — a son and two daughter. He is a consistent supporter and practitioner of the ancient Chinese philosophy of qigong.

Father-in-law — Ramazan Gadzhimuradovich Abdulatipov, ex-head of the Republic of Dagestan.
