= David Churbuck =

American journalist

- Occupations: Blogger, writer
- Known for: Co-founder of forbes.com
- Website: churbuck.com

David Churbuck is a blogger, technology journalist, and co-founder and former editor of forbes.com.

== Career ==
Churbuck has over 25 years of experience in print and online media. He began his career in journalism as an intern for Cape Cod Times. He worked his way up to becoming political editor and Massachusetts statehouse bureau chief for the Lawrence Eagle-Tribune. In 1988, he joined Forbes magazine as a senior editor. From 1994 to 2000, he directed Forbes's new media strategy. He later joined McKinsey & Company, where he was responsible for launching the firm's e-commerce online publication. Subsequently he served as vice president of global web marketing at Lenovo. Later he became vice president of corporate marketing at Acquia. In 2018, he became head of the Boston office of Sitrick and Company, a crisis management and strategic communications firm with headquarters in Los Angeles. Presently, David Churbuck is a freelance journalist.

In 1988 he wrote The Book of Rowing about the history of the sport.

== Awards and honors ==
- Two first-place awards in consecutive years in the Excellence in Technology Communications competition

== Personal life ==
David Churbuck and his wife have three children.

He enjoys sculling and cycling.
