= Velodyne =

Audio equipment manufacturer

Velodyne Acoustics
- Company type: Private
- Industry: Audio equipment
- Founded: 1983
- Headquarters: Hamburg, Germany
- Key people: Mansour Mamaghani, CEO; Lorenzo Mamaghani, COO
- Products: subwoofers and related products
- Website: www.velodyneacoustics.com

Velodyne Acoustics GmbH, commonly known as Velodyne, is a company that makes subwoofers and related products and was originally founded by David Hall in Silicon Valley, California, in 1983 and was then purchased in 2019 by Audio Reference of Hamburg, Germany, and its owner Mansour Mamaghani.

The company also historically produced some headphone products and had a division called Velodyne Lidar that produced Lidar products and a division called Velodyne Marine that developed a boat stabilization technology. Velodyne founder David Hall spun off Velodyne Lidar as a separate company in 2016. Velodyne Marine is now also a separate company headquartered in Alameda, California, that remains owned by David Hall.

As of February 2022, the post-acquisition Velodyne Acoustics company's described technologies included only subwoofers and subwoofer-related technology.

== History ==
=== Audio equipment ===
David Hall founded Velodyne in 1983 as an audio company specializing in low-frequency sound and subwoofer technology. In 2012, Velodyne added a line of headphones to their product line, starting with the release of the vPulse in-ear headphones. The headphone product line was eventually discontinued.

=== Lidar technology ===
Around 2005, the company began developing a line of lidar products, particularly including those using multi-beam spinning lidar scanners mounted on automobiles. The lidar product line was spun off as a separate company called Velodyne Lidar in 2016. That company later severed its ties with David Hall after he stepped down as its CEO in January 2020 and as chairman of its board of directors in January 2021, although Hall has retained a large stake in the company and his wife remains on the board.

=== Marine technology ===
David Hall created the Velodyne Marine division of Velodyne in 2011. Velodyne Marine debuted its first self-stabilizing craft, the Martini, at the 2013 Miami boat show. This prototype was the world's first sea-faring vessel with an active suspension. The Martini derives its name from the claim that it can keep a cocktail from spilling even on turbulent waters. A combination of sponsons, moving metal legs, gyros and actuators keeps the craft's platform level as it sails. Wired compared the boat to "an Olympic hurdler: The legs fly up and down to clear obstacles, the torso and head stay level." Potential applications include combating seasickness and making docking easier.

=== Purchase of the remaining audio equipment business ===
After spinning off the product lines other than audio equipment into separate companies, the remainder of the company was purchased on November 22, 2019, by Audio Reference of Hamburg, Germany, after a year of negotiations between David Hall, the owner of Velodyne, and Mansour Mamaghani, the owner of Audio Reference. Audio Reference had been a longtime distributor of Velodyne products, and the purchase included all of the current inventory, spares, patents, designs, and tooling for Velodyne subwoofers.
