= The Contributor (website) =

American news website

- Available in: English
- Owner: Warecorp
- Website: thecontributor.com
- Current status: active

'The Contributor is an American news reporting website. The website syndicates the work of independent writers, journalists, artists and advocacy leaders.

== History ==
The site was started in 2012 by Tina Dupuy (who had previously been the managing editor of Crooks and Liars), and was originally known as Soapblox.net.

The Contributor works on a similar model as The Huffington Post, with contributors sharing their work. Unlike The Huffington Post, content creators who share their work on The Contributor receive a 50% share of advertising revenue.
