= Contributor network =

Online freelance writing arrangement

A contributor network (or contributor platform) is an arrangement in which an online publication releases articles authored by freelance writers, known as contributors, who are not part of its staff. Depending on the program, contributors may be paid or unpaid; paid contributors are typically compensated based on the volume of articles they produce or the amount of web traffic their articles generate.

Online publications use contributor networks to expand their content selection inexpensively. Because contributors are freelancers, publications can increase or decrease the number of contributors in their networks more easily than they can hire or fire employees. Some publications that use the contributor model exercise limited editorial oversight. For example, online articles written by Forbes contributors are not reviewed by editors prior to publication.

Contributor networks are vulnerable to conflicts of interest. Public relations agents and marketing companies have advertised their clients by submitting promotional articles to the contributor networks of Entrepreneur, Fast Company, Forbes, HuffPost, Inc., Insider, and Mashable.

== See also ==
- Content marketing
- Self-publishing
- Stringer (journalism)
- User-generated content
- Vanity press
