= Shot in the Dark (TV series) =

- Genre: Disaster documentary; Crime drama
- Directed by: Jeff Daniels
- Starring: Howard Raishbrook; Marc Raishbrook; Austin Raishbrook; Scott Lane; Victor Park; Todd Betts; Zak Holman; Steve Gentry
- No. of seasons: 1
- No. of episodes: 8

Production
- Executive producers: Emre Sahin; Kelly McPherson; Sarah Wetherbee; Tracy Bacal; Howard Raishbrook; Shannon Watts; J.C. Begley

Original release
- Network: Netflix
- Release: November 17, 2017

Shot in the Dark is an American documentary television series that premiered on Netflix on November 17, 2017. The eight-episode first season explores the story of stringers (freelance news writers or photographers) in Los Angeles, California. The series follows three companies that do stringing in the Los Angeles TV news market. It follows stringing companies OnScene.TV, LoudLabs LLC, and RMGNews as they compete to get the shot that sells to the news.

The show features the same subject matter and many of the same people as the 2007 series Stringers: LA.

== Episodes ==
No.	Title	Original release date
1	"The Hustle"	November 17, 2017
2	"Crash and Burn"	November 17, 2017
3	"Near Hits"	November 17, 2017
4	"Nice Package"	November 17, 2017
5	"String or Die"	November 17, 2017
6	"Dead of Night"	November 17, 2017
7	"Chasing Hell"	November 17, 2017
8	"Sh*tstorm"	November 17, 2017
