= Stringer (journalism) =

Freelance journalist, photographer, or videographer

In journalism, a stringer is a freelancer who contributes writing, photos, or videos to a photo agency, news agency, or other news organization. They are paid for each piece rather than a fixed salary. Stringers include journalists, photographers, or videographers.

As freelancers, stringers do not receive a regular salary, and the amount and type of work is typically at their discretion. However, stringers often have an ongoing relationship with one or more news organizations, to which they provide content on particular topics or locations when the opportunities arise.

== Etymology and use ==
In a journalistic context, the etymology of the word is uncertain. It is said that newspapers once paid such freelancer journalists per inch of printed text they generated, and that they used string to measure and bill their work. The theory given in the Oxford English Dictionary is that a stringer is a person who metaphorically strings words together.

The term is typically confined to news industry jargon. In print or in broadcast terms, stringers are sometimes referred to as correspondents or contributors. At other times, they may not receive any public recognition for the work they have contributed.

A reporter or photographer can "string" for a news organization in a number of different capacities and with varying degrees of regularity, so that the relationship between the organization and the stringer is typically very loose. When it is difficult for a staff reporter or photographer to reach a location quickly for breaking news stories, larger news organizations often rely on local stringers to provide rapid scene descriptions, quotations or photos. In this capacity, stringers are used heavily by most television news organizations and some print publications for video footage, photos, and interviews.

== Notable stringers ==
The following worked as stringers at some point in their lives:

- Phil Donahue
- Horace Greeley
- Steven Koechner
- Ivy Lee
- Hunter S. Thompson
- Weegee
- Billy Wilder
- Shot in the Dark, a 2017 Netflix seris, follows a group of stringers in Los Angeles, California.
- The 2025 film The Stringer investigated who took a famous Vietnam War photograph

=== Fictional stringers ===
- Peter Parker (Spider-Man) is commonly depicted as a stringer, most notably selling photos and articles to the fictional Daily Bugle.
- Joe Pesci portrays a stringer in The Public Eye (1992).
- Timothy Muskatell plays Eric Hayes, a stringer in The Ghouls (2003).
- Jake Gyllenhaal plays Lou Bloom, a stringer, in Nightcrawler (2014).
- Henry Cavill plays Clark Kent (Superman), who is introduced to the staff of the Daily Planet by editor Perry White as their "new stringer", in Man of Steel (2013).

== See also ==
- Contributor network – Online freelance writing arrangement
- Parachute journalism – Aspect of journalism
