= Velodyne Lidar =

American technology company

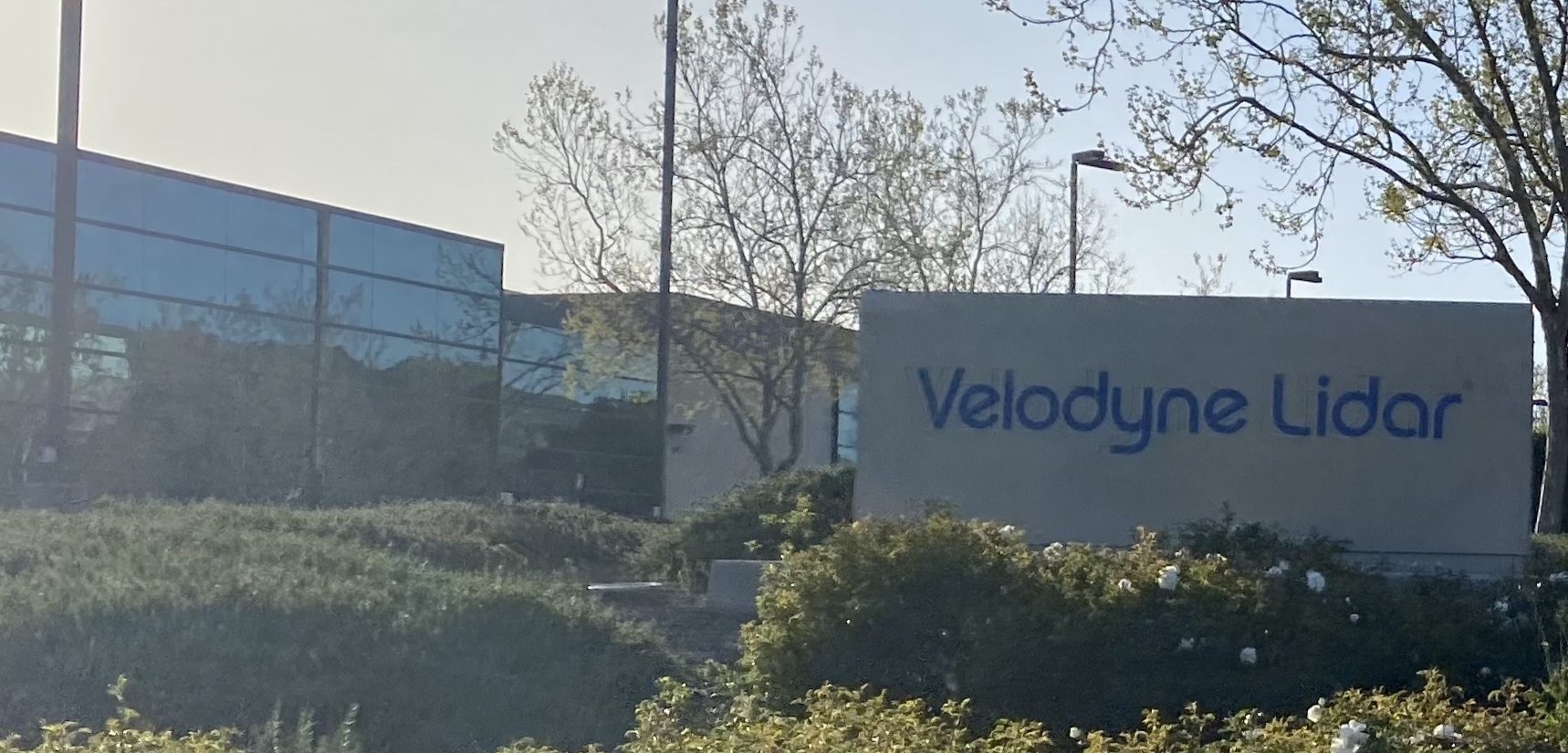
- Headquarters in the Edenvale district of San Jose, California in 2021
- Type: Public
- Traded as: Nasdaq: VLDR
- Industry: Lidar
- Founded: 2016; 10 years ago as Velodyne Acoustics spin-off
- Founder: David Hall
- Defunct: February 2023
- Fate: Merged with Ouster
- Headquarters: San Jose, California, United States
- Key people: Ted Tewksbury (CEO)
- Products: Lidar
- Revenue: ▼$61.92 million (2021)
- Number of employees: 407 (Dec 2021)
- Website: velodynelidar.com

Velodyne Lidar is a Silicon Valley–based lidar technology company headquartered in San Jose, California. It was spun off from Velodyne Acoustics in 2016. As of July 2020, the company had about 300 customers. Velodyne Lidar provides sensors for use in autonomous vehicles, advanced driver-assistance systems, mapping, robotics, infrastructure, and smart city applications. In February 2023, the company merged with Ouster.

== History ==
David Hall founded Velodyne in 1983 as an audio company specializing in subwoofer technology. Velodyne's experience with laser-based distance measurement began in 2005, when David Hall and his brother Bruce (then president of Velodyne) entered a vehicle in the DARPA Grand Challenge, a driverless car race sponsored by the Defense Advanced Research Projects Agency (DARPA). The experience highlighted shortcomings in camera-centric approaches and in existing lidar technology, which only scanned a single fixed line of sight. Velodyne developed new multi-laser sensors for the 2007 race. The Hall brothers sold their lidar system as a steering input to five of the six teams that finished the 2007 challenge. The system rotated 64 lasers and measured the time of flight of each beam to calculate distances to surrounding objects, creating a 360-degree 3D map of the environment. The new system produced about one million data points per second, compared to 5,000 data points per second for earlier systems.

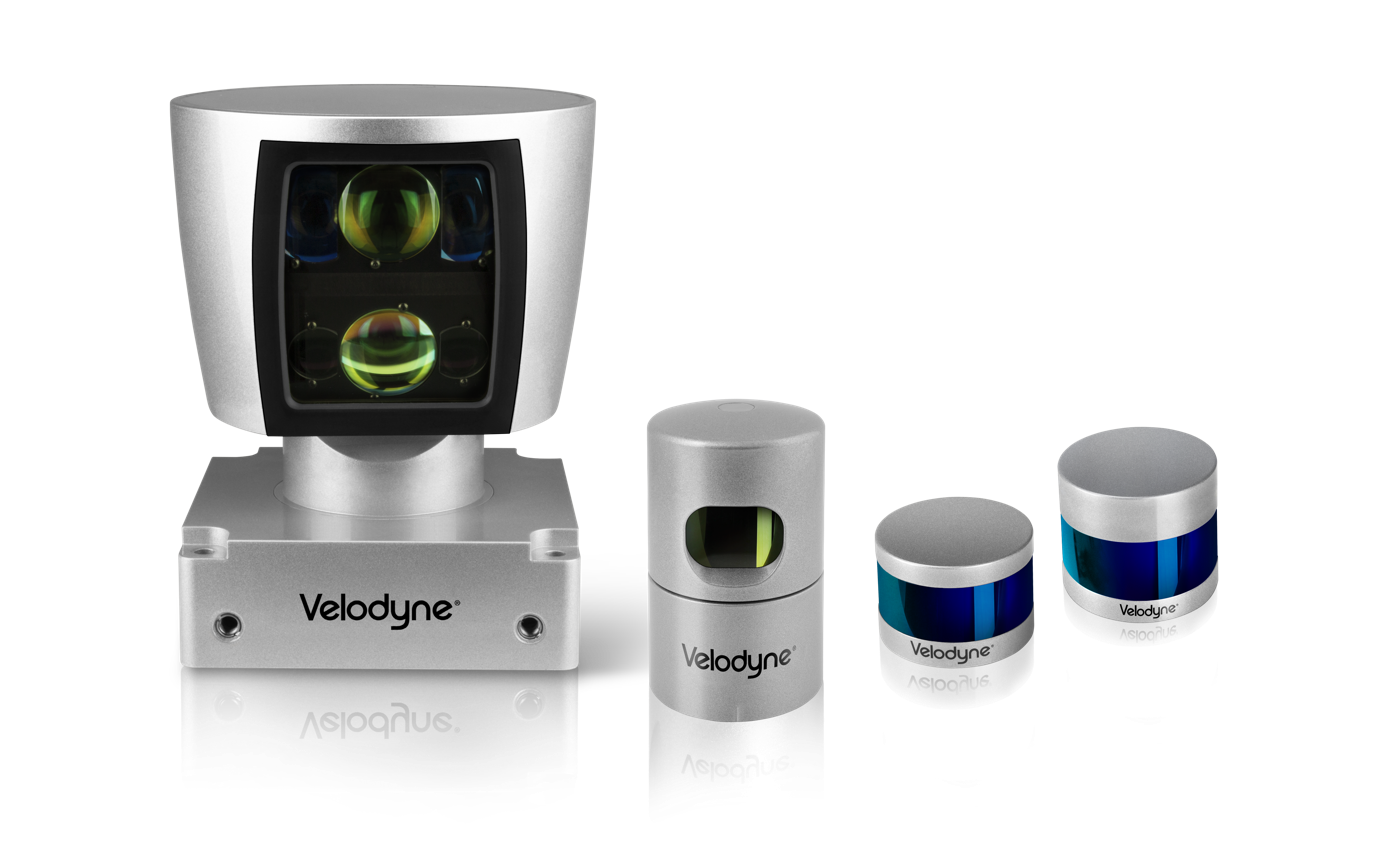
A Velodyne HDL-64E, an HDL-32E, a Puck, and an Ultra Puck

In 2011, Velodyne donated one of its early prototype sensors to the Robotics Collection at the Smithsonian Institution’s National Museum of American History.

In 2016, Velodyne’s lidar division was spun off from Velodyne Acoustics as Velodyne Lidar, Inc. On August 16, 2016, Velodyne announced a $150 million investment from Ford and Baidu. In 2017, Velodyne opened a "megafactory" in San Jose, California, to increase production capacity. The company also established an R&D center in Alameda, California. That same year, Velodyne sponsored the SAE/GM AutoDrive Challenge, a three-year autonomous vehicle competition for university teams, by providing its sensors.

Since 2018, Velodyne has partnered with Mothers Against Drunk Driving (MADD) in a campaign promoting autonomous vehicles for improved roadway safety and the prevention of impaired driving. Since October 2018, Velodyne has organized an annual "World Safety Summit on Autonomous Technology". Also in 2018, the company signed agreements to collaborate with Nikon and Veoneer on manufacturing and mass production of lidar systems.

In July 2019, Velodyne acquired mapping and localization software assets from Mapper.ai to bolster its software capabilities. In January 2020, David Hall stepped down as CEO and was succeeded by Anand Gopalan, the former CTO, although Hall initially remained as chairman of the board and the company's largest shareholder. On July 2, 2020, Velodyne Lidar merged with Graf Industrial Corp., a special-purpose acquisition company, to become a publicly traded company. In September 2020, Velodyne began trading on the NASDAQ under the ticker symbols VLDR and VLDRW.

In January 2021, the company removed Hall as chairman of the board and terminated the employment of his wife, Marta Thoma Hall, amid a dispute in which both the Halls and the company accused each other of misconduct. However, Hall retained a large ownership stake in the company, and Marta Thoma Hall remained on the board of directors. In November 2021, Gopalan was replaced as CEO by Theodore "Ted" Tewksbury, a former chief executive of Eta Compute, a low-power AI vision systems company. On February 7, 2022, Velodyne’s stock price surged more than 50% after Amazon agreed to acquire 40 million shares of the company’s stock as an investment. In November 2022, Ouster and Velodyne announced an agreement to merge in an all-stock transaction, splitting ownership of the combined entity evenly between the two companies’ shareholders. The merger was completed in February 2023, with the combined company taking the Ouster name and continuing to trade on the New York Stock Exchange under the ticker "OUST".

== Technology ==
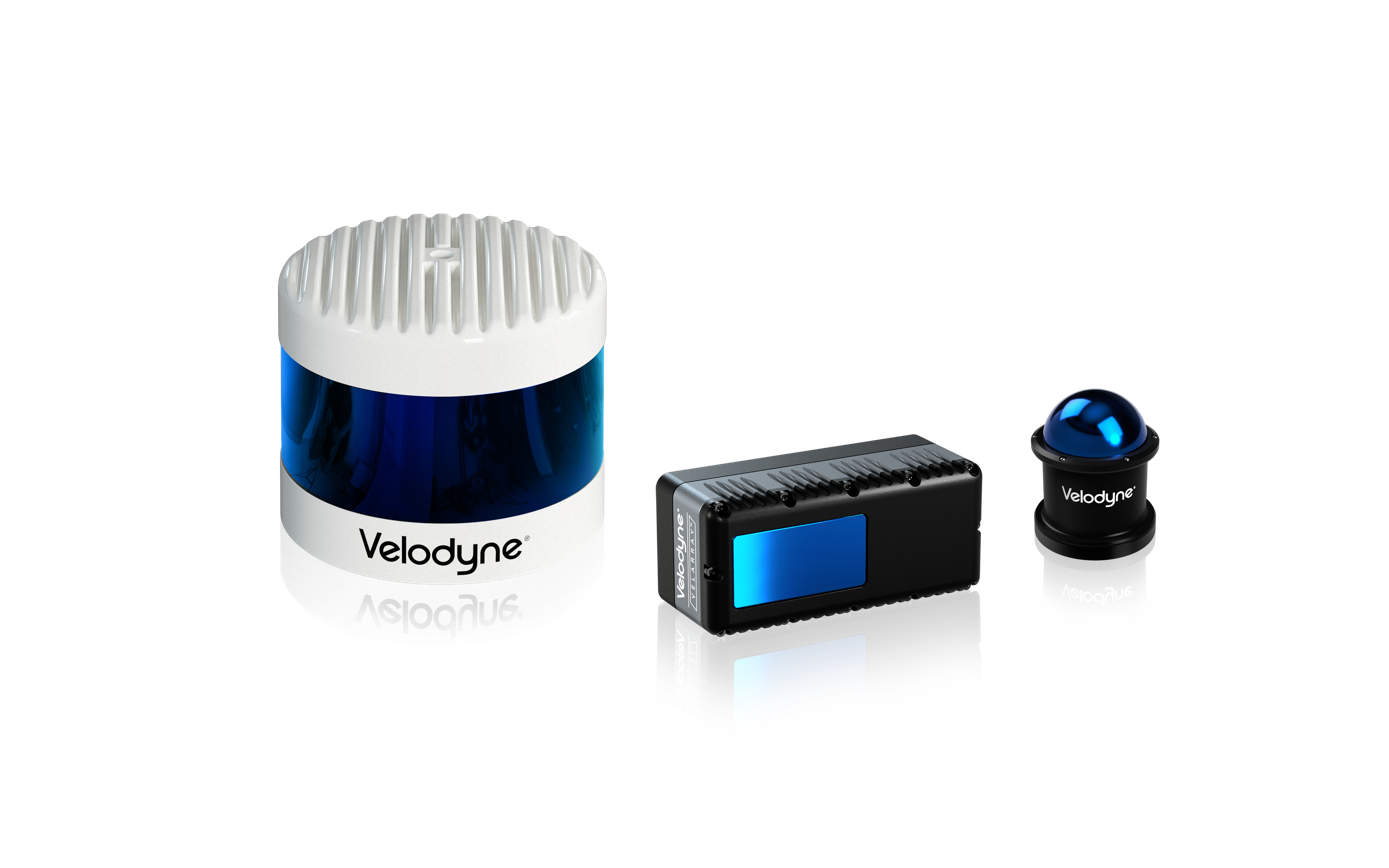
An Alpha Puck, Velarray, and VelaDome

Applications for Velodyne Lidar’s technology include autonomous vehicles, advanced driver-assistance systems (ADAS), mapping, security, and unmanned aerial vehicles. Velodyne’s sensors have a range of up to 300 meters and can be used for object detection without requiring additional sensor fusion. When mounted on a moving vehicle, a Velodyne sensor can create a detailed real-time image of the road ahead, including features such as street signs and foliage.

In April 2017, Velodyne introduced the Velarray, a compact solid-state lidar unit that produces a directional image rather than the 360° surround view of the company’s earlier sensors. Velodyne stated that the Velarray’s range, resolution, and field of view would improve object detection and allow longer braking distances compared to the company’s previous 360° lidar products. The initial Velarray model offered a 120° horizontal and 35° vertical field of view, with a range of 200 metres (660 ft). The Velarray was designed for seamless vehicle integration and could be concealed in rooflines, inside bumpers, or behind windshields.

Also in 2017, the company unveiled the “Alpha Puck” (previously known as the VLS-128) lidar sensor, which has a range of up to 300 meters. This sensor is designed for autonomous driving and advanced vehicle safety at highway speeds.

In 2019, Velodyne introduced the VelaDome, a compact embeddable lidar with a 180°×180° field of view for near-object detection. The company also introduced a software product called Vella, which integrates Velodyne’s sensors into ADAS features such as lane keeping assist, automatic emergency braking, and adaptive cruise control. In November 2019, Velodyne announced the Alpha Prime sensor, a lidar unit intended to improve vehicle safety and provide high-resolution mapping capabilities.

In 2020, Velodyne unveiled the Velabit, described as the company’s smallest lidar sensor. It also introduced the Velarray H800, a solid-state sensor based on a micro-lidar array architecture, and the Velarray M1600, a solid-state sensor for autonomous mobile robots and last-mile delivery systems.

== Partners and customers ==
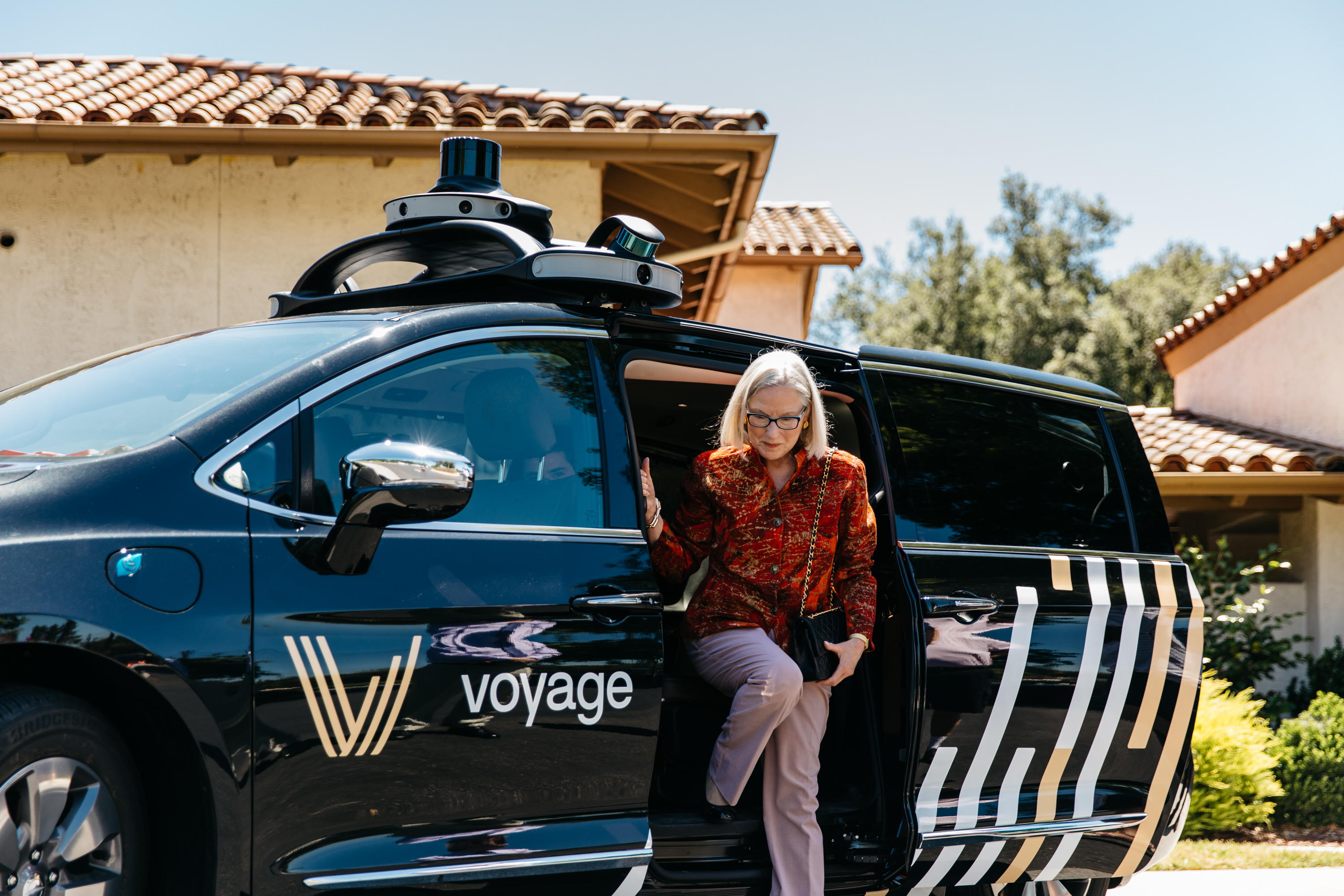
Velodyne Lidar Alpha Puck on a Voyage vehicle

In 2010, Google (now part of Alphabet) began testing self-driving cars in the San Francisco Bay Area using Velodyne’s lidar technology. Alphabet’s first self-driving car prototype (built on a Toyota Prius) used Velodyne’s HDL-64E lidar sensor. Alphabet (Google) has since stopped using Velodyne sensors in its vehicles.

In 2012, Velodyne Lidar signed a contract with Caterpillar to supply lidar sensors for off-road vehicles, to help Caterpillar machines map quarries, farms, and construction sites. From 2012 to 2015, Velodyne’s spinning HDL-32E sensors were used in mobile mapping vehicles operated by companies such as Nokia Here, Microsoft Bing Maps, Tencent, Baidu, and TomTom. Mapping technology providers including Topcon and Leica Geosystems also use Velodyne’s scanners for mobile mapping.

In 2016, Ford Motor Company announced that it would expand its fleet of self-driving research vehicles using Velodyne’s “Ultra Puck” lidar sensors. By the end of 2020, Ford had sold off its 7.6% ownership stake in Velodyne Lidar.

In 2017, Velodyne partnered with Renovo to serve as the reference lidar provider for Renovo’s AWare autonomous mobility operating system, and secured a perception system contract from Mercedes-Benz.

In 2018, Velodyne announced partnerships with Embark, Geodetics, Voyage, Exyn Technologies, Yellowscan, Phoenix LiDAR, NAVYA, ThorDrive, and Postmates. Velodyne Lidar also received a $25 million investment from Nikon as part of a partnership for autonomous vision technology.

In 2019, Velodyne partnered with Clearpath Robotics, Holomatic, Kaarta, and Hyundai Mobis.

In 2020, the company announced agreements with TLD, EasyMile, Emesent, Baidu, and Local Motors.
