= Ouster (company) =

American technology company

Ouster, Inc.
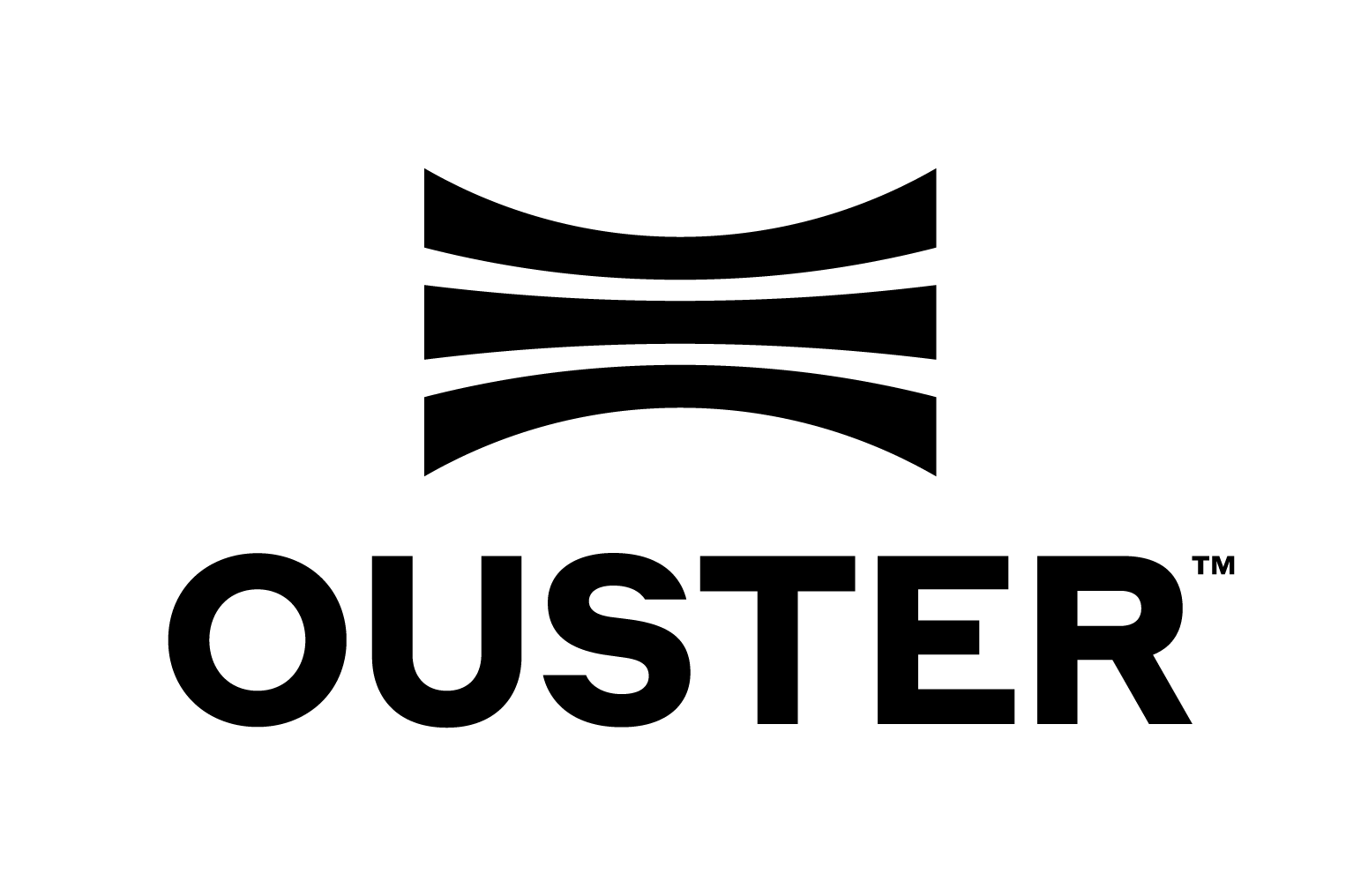
- Type: Public
- Traded as: Nasdaq: OUST; Nasdaq: OUSTZ (warrants); Nasdaq: OUSTW (warrants)
- Industry: perception, Lidar, Stereo camera
- Founded: 2015; 11 years ago
- Founders: Angus Pacala; Mark Frichtl
- Headquarters: San Francisco, California, United States
- Key people: Angus Pacala (CEO); Mark Frichtl (CTO)
- Products: Lidar, Lidar software, Stereo Cameras, Smart City infastructure & software
- Revenue: ▲US$169 million (2025)
- Operating income: ▲US$−82 million (2025)
- Net income: ▲US$−60 million (2025)
- Total assets: ▲US$354 million (2025)
- Total equity: ▲US$261.7 million (2025)
- Number of employees: c. 350 (September 2026)
- Website: ouster.com

Ouster, Inc. is an American lidar technology company headquartered in San Francisco, California. It builds high-resolution, digital 3D lidar and native colour lidar sensors for use in industrial, robotics, drones, mapping, autonomous vehicles defense, and security systems.

Its sensors produce images from ambient infrared, with software that enables a vehicle's sensing and mapping functions.

== History ==
Angus Pacala and Mark Frichtl founded Ouster in 2015, along with two other former Stanford University classmates, after working at laser-based sensing company Quanergy.

In December 2017 the company launched out of stealth, raising a $27 million series A.

In 2019 Ouster raised an additional $60 million in a round led by Runway Growth Capital, with contributions from Silicon Valley Bank, Cox Enterprises, Constellation Tech Ventures, Fontinalis Partners, and Carthona Capital — bringing the company's total raised to $90 million.

In March 2021, Ouster completed a merger with Colonnade Acquisition, a special-purpose acquisition company and became publicly traded on the New York Stock Exchange.

In October 2021, Ouster agreed to buy Sense Photonics in an all-stock deal valued around $68 million at the time of the announcement. On completion, Ouster said it would establish Ouster Automotive, a new business arm, which will be headed by Sense CEO Shauna McIntyre.

In November 2022, Ouster and Velodyne Lidar agreed to merge in an all-share transaction in which the combined business will be split evenly between the two companies' existing shareholders. The merger completed in February 2023, with the combined company retaining the Ouster name.

On 4, February 2026 Ouster acquired Stereolabs SAS, a leading provider of stereo cameras. Stereolabs is a French comapany founded in 2010 with over 10,000 customers and has shipped over 90,000 cameras for advanced perception systems for robotics and machinery.

In May 2026, Ouster released the world's first native colour lidar system, REV8.

== Operations ==
Ouster produces four main categories of lidar sensors with varying sizes and range: the OS0, OS1, OS2 and OSDome. These are manufactured in its production facilities in the United States and Thailand. The company has worked with firms in over 15 different industries across 50 countries.

In 2019, Ouster opened new offices in Paris, Shanghai, and Hong Kong in order to scale its business. The same year Ouster sensors were installed in Postmates’ 'Serve' Autonomous Delivery Rovers operating on sidewalks of Los Angeles, Kodiak’s trucks operating in Texas adopted its sensors for testing. For the 2019 DARPA SubT challenge coal mines of Pennsylvania, its lidar sensors were mounted on drones. Ouster lidar sensors are used to provide vehicles with the ability to sense, classify, and understand its immediate environment.

In Summer 2026 Ouster partnered with Benchmark Electronics to manufacture Ouster REV8 lidar, up to 100,000 lidar systems yearly.

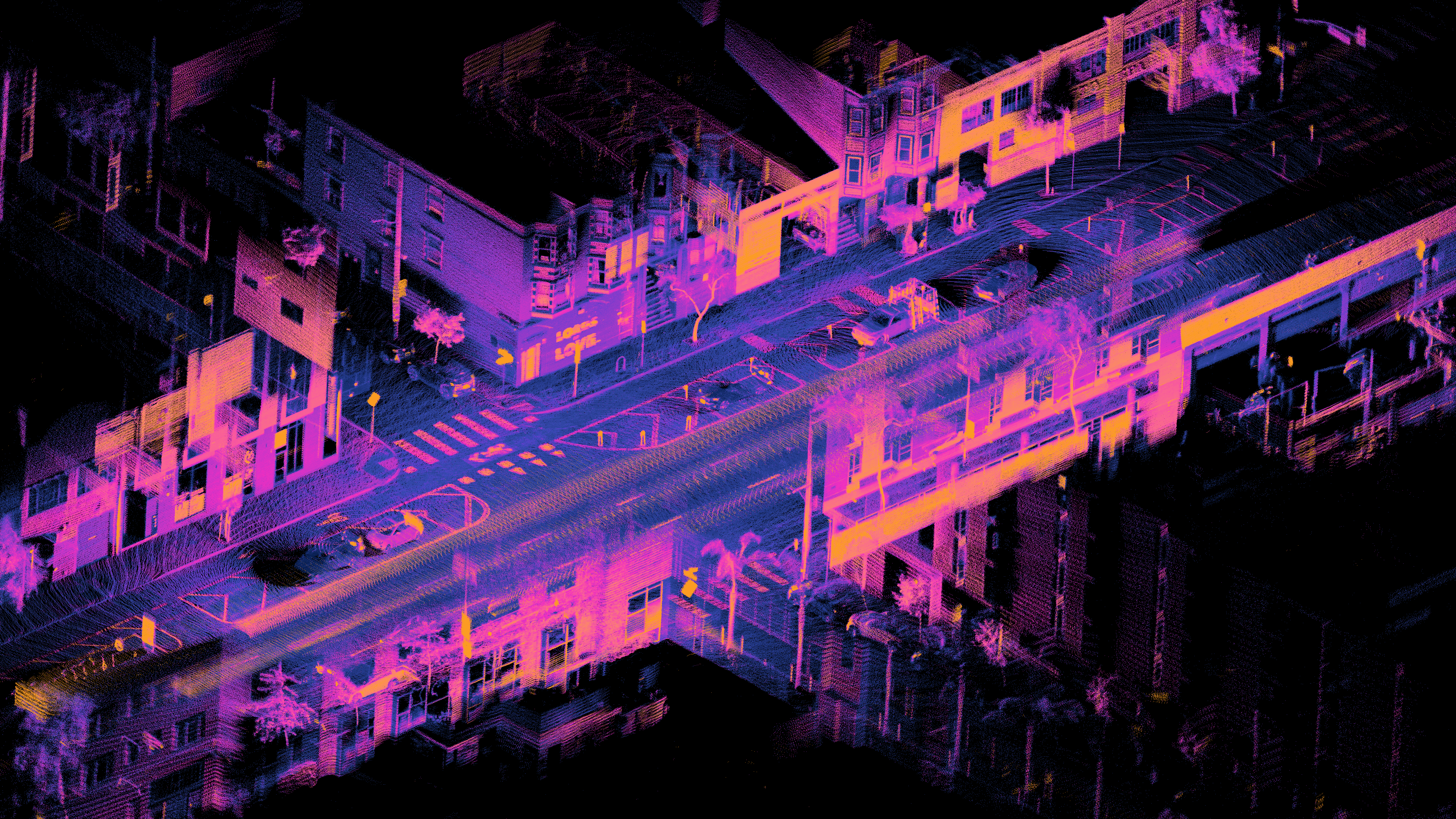
A point cloud generated from a moving car using a single Ouster OS1 lidar

== REV8 Overview ==
Specification	OSDome	OS0	OS1	OS1Max
Range at 10% Target	20 m	35 m	90 m	200 m
Precision (up to)	0.5 cm +/-	0.25 cm +/-	0.25 cm +/-	0.25 cm +/-
Vertical Resolution (up to)	1.4°	0.7°	0.34°	0.17°
Horizontal Resolution (up to)	0.09°	0.09°	0.09°	0.09°
Weight	540 g	500 g	500 g	670 g
Vertical Resolution	32, 64, or 128	32, 64, or 128	32, 64, or 128	32, 64, 128, or 256 channels
Maximum Representable Range	~250 m	~250 m	~250 m	~500 m
Vertical Field of View	180°	90°	45°	45°
Vertical Angular Resolution	1.4° (64ch), 0.7° (128ch)	1.4° (64ch), 0.7° (128ch)	0.69° (64ch), 0.34° (128ch)	0.17° (256ch)
Horizontal Resolution	512, 1024, 2048, or 4096	512, 1024, 2048, or 4096	512, 1024, 2048, or 4096	512, 1024, 2048, or 4096
Horizontal Field of View	360°	360°	360°	360°
Horizontal Angular Resolution	0.09°	0.09°	0.09°	0.09°
Points per Second	up to 10,485,760	up to 10,485,760	up to 10,485,760	10,485,760
Frame Rate	5, 10, 15, 20, 30, or 40 Hz	5, 10, 15, 20, 30, or 40 Hz	5, 10, 15, 20, 30, or 40 Hz	5, 10, 15, 20, 30, or 40 Hz
Minimum Range	0.0m	0.0m	0.0m	0.0m

== Awards and recognition ==
- In 2020, Ouster was an Honoree at the CES Innovation Awards for the OS2-128 LiDAR sensor within the Vehicle Intelligence & Transportation category.
