= Stealth mode =

Temporary secret state of a company

In business, stealth mode is a company's temporary state of secretiveness, either in total stealth mode when everything about the company is kept secret, or in-company stealth mode which is usually undertaken to avoid alerting competitors to a pending product launch or another business initiative by keeping that specific thing covert.

When an entire company is in stealth mode it may attempt to mislead the public about its true company goals. For example, it may give code names to its pending products. It may operate a corporate website that does not disclose its personnel or location. New companies may operate under a temporary "stealth name" that does not disclose its field of business. To enforce stealthy behavior, companies often require employees to sign non-disclosure agreements, and strictly control who may speak with the media.

At the in-company stealth mode level, a stealth mode can also refer to a new project or idea that is kept secret, not just from external parties, but also from internal stakeholders in order to avoid a (premature) dismissal of the idea. Key behaviors can include soliciting informal project sponsors, engaging in covert testing of the concept, freeing up extra resources and building a "cover story" for the project.

A stealth product is a product that a company develops in secret, while a stealth company (stealth startup) is a new company that avoids initial disclosure as to its existence, purpose, products, personnel, funding, brand name, or other important attributes. The phenomenon is well known in the venture capital (VC) community. Since investors may have to disclose funding a stealth startup, their names are made public; but often, only a general summary description is known about the company.

The term stealth innovation has been applied to individual projects and ideas that are developed in secret inside a company.

== Background ==
Startups operating in "stealth mode" often do so to protect new ideas and intellectual property. If a startup is working on a revolutionary product that would be easy to replicate, operating as a stealth startup and not publicizing product details decreases the risk of the product being copied by other companies, as does having their employees execute NDAs. While this risk can be mitigated by patents, applying for a patent is a lengthy and expensive process, which is often not a viable option for a startup.

Whereas secrecy is the historical norm in many fields of business, start-up companies often thrive on publicity and open sharing of information. Openness is common to the business culture of Silicon Valley and other technology centers, with competitors freely exchanging news of discoveries, products under development, and other company news. There is intense media interest in some business sectors, with even relatively small funding rounds covered in specialized press. Public relations is considered useful to attract interest from talent, customers, and investors, and to promote the careers of the people involved. Additionally, competitors often collaborate on projects or buy each other's products. Some companies nevertheless avoid publicity in fields that are ordinarily not secretive. Among the reasons, a small, relatively unfunded company may wish to avoid giving companies with more resources time to develop competing technologies. The very announcement that a larger or better-known company is working on a competing product may damp interest in the smaller upstart.

If the innovative company has no realistic means of protecting its new intellectual property, it may seek to obtain a "first-mover advantage" by waiting until the company or its products are ready to sell before they are announced. This gives as long a lead as possible before others may copy its products, distribution channels, brand, or other business advantages. Similarly, companies with a protectable new technology may nevertheless wish to wait until they have filed or obtained a patent.
