= 2017 Rock Cup =

Tournament details
- Country: Gibraltar
- Teams: 19

Final positions
- Champions: Europa
- Runners-up: Lincoln Red Imps

Tournament statistics
- Matches played: 18
- Goals scored: 64 (3.56 per match)
- Top goal scorer: Kike Gómez (4 goals)

The 2017 Rock Cup was a single-leg knockout tournament played by clubs from Gibraltar. This year's version of the Rock Cup was sponsored by Gibtelecom, and was known as the Gibtelecom Rock Cup for sponsorship purposes.

The winner of this competition (Europa) qualified for the 2017–18 Europa League. Since they won the 2016–17 Gibraltar Premier Division, the spot reserved for the cup winner went to the third place team from the league instead.

== First round ==
The First Round draw was held 14 December 2016 and the matches were played 17–18 January 2017. All teams participating in the first round are from the Gibraltar Second Division.

17 January 2017	Olympique 13 (2)	0–2	Boca Gibraltar (2)	Gibraltar
20:30		Report	K. Robba 46'; Nuñez 73'	Stadium: Victoria Stadium

18 January 2017	Cannons (2)	1–1 (a.e.t.) (4–3 p)	Bruno's Magpies (2)	Gibraltar
18:15	Mesua 13'	Report	Nuercano 15'	Stadium: Victoria Stadium

18 January 2017	Leo (2)	5–1	Angels (2)	Gibraltar
20:30	Moya Garcia 44'; Jimenez Ramon 65', 81'; Ruiz Vecino 87', 89'	Report	Pino Moreno 24'	Stadium: Victoria Stadium

== Second round ==
The Second Round draw took place on 20 January 2017, and the matches were played from 10–15 February. Teams from the Premier Division, the three winners from the first round, as well as the three sides who received byes in the first round, entered here.

10 February 2017	Boca Gibraltar (2)	1–8	Lynx (1)	Gibraltar
20:30	Quiñones 41'		O'Dwyer 17', 81'; Segura 34'; Ouattara 39'; Gutierez 46'; Guilling 53'; Kamara 60'; Olmos 87'	Stadium: Victoria Stadium

11 February 2017	Mons Calpe (1)	0–1	St Joseph's (1)	Gibraltar
16:30			Lorenzo 46'	Stadium: Victoria Stadium

11 February 2017	Manchester 62 (1)	2–0	Gibraltar United (1)	Gibraltar
19:00	Tra 19'; Gomez 67'			Stadium: Victoria Stadium

12 February 2017	Lincoln Red Imps (1)	12–0	Hound Dogs (2)	Gibraltar
16:30	Cabrera 7'; Etchemaite 21'; R. Chipolina 24', 65'; Garcia 32'; L. Casciaro 49'; K. Casciaro 54'; Bardon 63', 68'; Dieguito 80'; Wszeborowski 85' (o.g.); Tobler 88'			Stadium: Victoria Stadium

12 February 2017	Glacis United (1)	1–3	Europa FC (1)	Gibraltar
19:00	Sánchez 65'		Belforti 53'; Kike 56'; Roldán 88'	Stadium: Victoria Stadium

13 February 2017	College 1975 (2)	0–3	Europa Point (1)	Gibraltar
20:30			Ayala 35'; Moreno 52'; Vinet 90'	Stadium: Victoria Stadium

14 February 2017	Cannons (2)	1–3	Lions Gibraltar (1)	Gibraltar
20:30	Mesua 57'		Gonzales 44'; Gilroy 80'; Carretero 90' (pen.)	Stadium: Victoria Stadium

15 February 2017	Leo (2)	0–6	Gibraltar Phoenix (2)	Gibraltar
20:30			Dominguez 16', 24', 56'; Narvaez 63'; Nuñez 77'; Martinez 84'	Stadium: Victoria Stadium

== Quarter–finals ==
The quarter-final matches were played 10–12 March 2017.

10 March 2017	Lincoln Red Imps (1)	3–0	Manchester 62 (1)	Gibraltar
20:30	Calderón 52'; L. Casciaro 71'; Bardon 87'			Stadium: Victoria Stadium

11 March 2017	Europa FC (1)	2–0	Europa Point (1)	Gibraltar
18:15	Kike 76'; Walker 87'			Stadium: Victoria Stadium

11 March 2017	Gibraltar Phoenix (2)	2–0	Lions Gibraltar (1)	Gibraltar
20:30	Rubio 49'; Narvaez 86'			Stadium: Victoria Stadium

12 March 2017	Lynx (1)	0–0 (2–4 p)	St Joseph's (1)	Gibraltar
16:30				Stadium: Victoria Stadium

== Semi–finals ==
The semi-final matches were played 25–26 April 2017.

25 April 2017	Lincoln Red Imps (1)	1–0	St Joseph's (1)	Gibraltar
19:30	J. Chipolina 41' (pen.)			Stadium: Victoria Stadium

26 April 2017	Gibraltar Phoenix (2)	0–2	Europa FC (1)	Gibraltar
19:30			Joselinho 57'; Álex Quillo 79'	Stadium: Victoria Stadium

== Final ==
28 May 2017	Europa FC	3–0	Lincoln Red Imps	Victoria Stadium
19:00	Álex Quillo 19'; Kike 57', 68'			Referee: Jason Barcelo

== See also ==
- 2016–17 Gibraltar Premier Division
- 2016–17 Gibraltar Second Division
