= 2017–18 Rock Cup =

Tournament details
- Country: Gibraltar
- Teams: 19

Final positions
- Champions: Europa (7th title)
- Runners-up: Mons Calpe

Tournament statistics
- Matches played: 18
- Goals scored: 62 (3.44 per match)
- Top goal scorer(s): Rubo Blanco; Kike Gómez (6 goals)

The 2017–18 Rock Cup was a single-leg knockout tournament played by clubs from Gibraltar. This season's version of the Rock Cup was sponsored by Gibtelecom, and is known as the Gibtelecom Rock Cup for sponsorship purposes. This season's edition was held throughout the season for the first time since 2011–12.

The winner of this competition, Europa, qualified for the 2018–19 Europa League. As they had also qualified for European competition via the 2017–18 Gibraltar Premier Division, the third place team in the league will take the spot in the Europa League.

== First round ==
The First Round draw was held 26 October 2017 and the matches will be played 26–28 November 2017. All teams participating in the first round are from the Gibraltar Second Division. Leo, Hound Dogs and Olympique 13 received byes to the Second Round.

26 November 2017	College 1975 (2)	1–3	Europa Point (2)	Gibraltar
16:30	Cruz 78'	Report	Edwards-Wilks 32'; Lopez Blazquez 52'; Postigo 89'	Stadium: Victoria Stadium; Referee: Denis Perez

27 November 2017	Boca Gibraltar (2)	0–2	Cannons (2)	Gibraltar
20:30		Report	Jimenez Falcon 9'; J. Rivas 39'	Stadium: Victoria Stadium; Referee: Abdul El Yettefti

28 November 2017	Bruno's Magpies (2)	3–1	Angels (2)	Gibraltar
18:15	Cuesta 17', 75'; Price-Placid 35'	Report	Martos 38'	Stadium: Victoria Stadium; Referee: Alvaro Delgado

== Second round ==
The draw for the Second Round took place on 13 December 2017, with games to be played 6–27 February 2018. All Gibraltar Premier Division teams enter at this stage, along with the three Gibraltar Second Division teams to receive byes from the first round.

6 February 2018	Mons Calpe (1)	4–1	Lions Gibraltar (1)	Gibraltar
20:30	Blanco 52', 71', 74', 81' (pen.)	Report	Llaves 73'	Stadium: Victoria Stadium; Referee: Herbert Warwick

7 February 2018	Cannons (2)	2–0	Hound Dogs (2)	Gibraltar
18:15	Pineda 17'; J. Rivas 83'	Report		Stadium: Victoria Stadium; Referee: Juan Miguel Vega

7 February 2018	Gibraltar United (1)	3–1	Manchester 62 (1)	Gibraltar
20:30	Elghobashy 4'; Meireles 18'; Ponce 53'	Report	Rodriguez 64'	Stadium: Victoria Stadium; Referee: Yaroslaff Borg

8 February 2018	FC Olympique 13 (2)	2–2 (4–3 p)	Europa Point (2)	Gibraltar
20:30	Ritchie 23'; K. Casciaro 90'	Report	Nuñez 28'; Campoy 83' (pen.)	Stadium: Victoria Stadium; Referee: Alvaro Delgado
	Penalties
	Montovio (penalty scored); K. Casciaro (penalty scored); Rodriquez (penalty missed); Parker (penalty scored); J. Perez (penalty scored)		(penalty scored) Ruiz; (penalty scored) Gallego; (penalty missed) Sabastro; (penalty missed) Nuñez; (penalty scored) Serrano

19 February 2018	Lynx (1)	0–2	Europa (1)	Gibraltar
20:30		Report	Roldán 10', 14'	Stadium: Victoria Stadium

20 February 2018	Lincoln Red Imps (1)	3–0	Glacis United (1)	Gibraltar
20:30	J. Pérez 17' (o.g.); Calderón 24' (pen.); De Barr 90'	Report		Stadium: Victoria Stadium

26 February 2018	Bruno's Magpies (2)	1–2	Gibraltar Phoenix (1)	Gibraltar
20:30	Gaul 11'	Report	Godoy 12', 65'	Stadium: Victoria Stadium

27 February 2018	St Joseph's (1)	3–0	Leo (2)	Gibraltar
20:30	Villalba 4' (pen.); Ferrer 19'; Duarte 70' (pen.)	Report		Stadium: Victoria Stadium

== Quarter-finals ==
The quarter final draw took place on 28 February 2018.

11 March 2018	Lincoln Red Imps (1)	2–0	Cannons (2)	Gibraltar
16:30	Bardon 63'; Aranda 72'	Report		Stadium: Victoria Stadium; Referee: Jason Barcelo

11 March 2018	FC Olympique 13 (2)	0–6	Gibraltar United (1)	Gibraltar
19:00		Report	Negrette 20', 27'; Elghobashy 52', 57'; De Torres 72'; Prescott 74'	Stadium: Victoria Stadium; Referee: Yaroslaff Borg

18 March 2018	Mons Calpe (1)	2–1	St Joseph's (1)	Gibraltar
16:30	Pibe 36', 90'	Report	Duarte 87'	Stadium: Victoria Stadium; Referee: Yaroslaff Borg

9 April 2018	Europa (1)	5–0	Gibraltar Phoenix (1)	Gibraltar
20:30	Carreño 32'; Belforti 40'; Gómez 63', 89'; Toni 71'	Report		Stadium: Victoria Stadium; Referee: Abdul El Yettefti

== Semi-finals ==
The draw for the semi-finals took place on 11 April 2018.

23 April 2018	Gibraltar United (1)	0–5	Mons Calpe (1)	Gibraltar
19:30		Report	Pibe 24', 44'; Blanco 58', 65'; Cascio 62'	Stadium: Victoria Stadium; Referee: Patrick Canepa

24 April 2018	Lincoln Red Imps (1)	1–3	Europa (1)	Gibraltar
19:30	Hernandez 21' (pen.)	Report	Gómez 14', 38'; Roldán 26'	Stadium: Victoria Stadium; Referee: Tim Reoch

== Final ==
27 May 2018
18:00 CEST

Europa	2–1	Mons Calpe
Gómez 6', 75'	Report	Pibe 46'

Victoria Stadium, Gibraltar

GK	1	(Spain) Javi Muñoz (c)
RB	5	(Ghana) Ibrahim Ayew (yellow card)
CB	22	(Argentina) Martín Belforti
CB	42	(Spain) Alberto Merino
LB	11	(Spain) Toni García
RM	17	(Spain) Guillermo Roldán (yellow card)
CM	6	(Spain) Iván Moya (yellow card)
CM	20	(Ghana) Mustapha Yahaya
LM	8	(Spain) Álex Quillo (substituted off) 82'
CF	9	(Spain) Kike Gómez (substituted off) 78'
CF	19	(Gibraltar) Mikey Yome (substituted off) 60'
Substitutes:
GK	26	(Spain) José Camara
DF	2	(Gibraltar) Ethan Jolley (substituted on) 60'
MF	7	(Gibraltar) Sykes Garro
MF	24	(Spain) Joselinho
FW	10	(Spain) Jorge Pina
FW	21	(Spain) Ñito Gónzalez (substituted on) 82'
FW	27	(Spain) Enrique Carreño (substituted on) 78' (yellow card)
Interim Manager:
(Spain) Juan José Gallardo

GK	22	(Argentina) Mateo Grasso (yellow card)
RB	2	(Brazil) André Dos Santos (red card)
CB	5	(Mexico) Francisco Zúñiga (yellow card)
CB	6	(Brazil) Renan Bernardes (yellow card)
LB	24	(Argentina) Federico Villar
DM	11	(Argentina) Jonathan Di Toro
DM	3	(Gibraltar) Graeme Torrilla
RW	7	(Argentina) Manu Onega (yellow card) (red card)
AM	39	(Argentina) Pibe (substituted off) 60'
LW	10	(Italy) Facundo Cascio
ST	9	(Spain) Rubo Blanco (c)
Substitutes:
GK	17	(Italy) Nicky Arjona
DF	4	(Argentina) Leonardo Vela
MF	8	(Italy) Sacha Funes
MF	18	(Italy) Nahuel Ruiz
MF	20	(Gibraltar) Julian Bado
MF	21	(Mexico) Rodrigo Cerrilla (substituted on) 60'
MF	29	(Gibraltar) Jansen Dalli
Manager:
(Argentina) Luis Manuel Blanco

Man of the match: Kike Gómez

Match officials

- Assistant referees: Denis Perez & Alvaro Delgado
- Forth official: Herbert Warwick

Match rules

- 90 minutes.
- 30 minutes of extra-time if necessary.
- Penalty shoot-out if scores still level.
- Seven named substitutes.
- Maximum of three substitutions.

== Bracket ==
First Round
26 November 2017
College 1975	1
Europa Point	3
28 November 2017
Bruno's Magpies	3
Angels	1
27 November 2017
Boca Gibraltar	0
Cannons	2

Second Round
8 February 2018
FC Olympique 13	2 (4)
Europa Point	2 (3)
7 February 2018
Gibraltar United	3
Manchester 62	1
19 February 2018
Lynx	0
Europa	2
26 February 2018
Bruno's Magpies	1
Gibraltar Phoenix	2
20 February 2018
Lincoln Red Imps	3
Glacis United	0
7 February 2018
Cannons	2
Hound Dogs	0
6 February 2018
Mons Calpe	4
Lions Gibraltar	1
27 February 2018
St Joseph's	3
Leo	0

Quarter Finals
11 March 2018
FC Olympique 13	0
Gibraltar United	6
9 April 2018
Europa	5
Gibraltar Phoenix	0
11 March 2018
Lincoln Red Imps	2
Cannons	0
18 March 2018
Mons Calpe	2
St Joseph's	1

Semi-Finals
23 April 2018
Gibraltar United	0
Europa	5
24 April 2018
Lincoln Red Imps	1
Mons Calpe	3

Final
27 May 2018
Europa	2
Mons Calpe	1

== Top goalscorers ==
As of 24 April 2018.
6 goals

- (Spain) Kike Gómez (Europa)
- (Spain) Rubo Blanco (Mons Calpe)

5 goals

- (Argentina) Pibe (Mons Calpe)

3 goals

- (Spain) Guillermo Roldán (Europa)
- (Egypt) Ayman Elghobashy (Gibraltar United)

2 goals

- (Spain) Fernando Cuesta (Bruno's Magpies)
- (Spain) Javier Rivas (Cannons)
- (Spain) Diego Godoy (Gibraltar Phoenix)
- Michael Negrette (Gibraltar United)
- (Gibraltar) John-Paul Duarte (St Joseph's)

1 goal

- (Spain) José María Martos (Angels)
- (England) Conor Gaul (Bruno's Magpies)
- (England) Reece Price-Placid (Bruno's Magpies)
- (Spain) Daniel Jimenez Falcon (Cannons)
- (Spain) Juan Carlos Pineda (Cannons)
- (Gibraltar) David Cruz (College 1975)
- (Spain) Enrique Carreño (Europa)
- (Argentina) Martín Belforti (Europa)
- (Spain) Toni García (Europa)
- (Spain) José Antonio Campoy (Europa Point)
- (England) Benjamin Edwards-Wilks (Europa Point)
- (Spain) José Luiz Lopez Blasquez (Europa Point)
- (Spain) Christian Nuñez (Europa Point)
- (Spain) Antonio Postigo (Europa Point)
- Tito De Torres (Gibraltar United)
- (Portugal) Marco Mereiles (Gibraltar United)
- (Spain) Dani Ponce (Gibraltar United)
- Cecil Prescott (Gibraltar United)
- (Spain) Falu Aranda (Lincoln Red Imps)
- (Gibraltar) Anthony Bardon (Lincoln Red Imps)
- (Spain) Antonio Calderón (Lincoln Red Imps)
- (Gibraltar) Tjay De Barr (Lincoln Red Imps)
- (Gibraltar) Anthony Hernandez (Lincoln Red Imps)
- (Spain) Juan Manuel Llaves (Lions Gibraltar)
- (Spain) Andro Rodriguez (Manchester 62)
- (Italy) Facundo Cascio (Mons Calpe)
- (Gibraltar) Kyle Casciaro (FC Olympique 13)
- (Scotland) Scott Ritchie (FC Olympique 13)
- (Spain) Domingo Ferrer (St Joseph's)
- (Spain) Wancho Villalba (St Joseph's)

Own goals

- (Spain) Juan José Pérez (Glacis United) - against Lincoln Red Imps
