= 2016 Rock Cup =

Tournament details
- Country: Gibraltar
- Teams: 22

Final positions
- Champions: Lincoln Red Imps
- Runners-up: Europa FC

Tournament statistics
- Matches played: 21
- Goals scored: 80 (3.81 per match)

The first match of the 2016 Rock Cup was played 10 January 2016. The competition will be a single-leg knockout tournament. The first round will be contested between second division teams, with premier division teams joining in the second round.

The winner of this competition qualifies for the 2016–17 UEFA Europa League and would be able to enter the tournament in the first qualifying round. If the 2016 Rock Cup winner also wins the 2015–16 Gibraltar Premier Division, the place reserved for the cup winner will go to the second place team from the league.

== First round ==
The First Round draw was held 1 December 2015 and the matches were played 10–14 January 2016. All teams in this round are Gibraltar Second Division teams.

Team 1	Score	Team 2
Leo	2–0	Boca Juniors
Gibraltar Phoenix	4–0	Hound Dogs
Olympique 13	1–3	Red Imps
Europa Point	1–2	Mons Calpe
Pegasus	2–5	College 1975
Cannons	1–3	Bruno's Magpies

== Second round ==
The Second Round draw was held 18 January 2016 and the matches were played 10–15 February 2016.

Team 1	Score	Team 2
Gibraltar United	2–1	Red Imps
Manchester 62	1–0	Lynx
St Joseph's	0–1	Europa FC
Lincoln Red Imps	5–1	Britannia XI
Mons Calpe	1–4	Lions Gibraltar
Gibraltar Phoenix	0–4	Angels
Leo	0–1	College 1975
Glacis United	7–0	Bruno's Magpies

== Quarter–finals ==
The quarter-finals draw was held 18 February 2016 and the matches were played 16–19 March 2016.

Team 1	Score	Team 2
College 1975	0–7	Manchester 62
Lincoln Red Imps	4–0	Glacis United
Lions Gibraltar	1–0	Gibraltar United
Angels	1–4	Europa FC

== Semi–finals ==
The semi-finals draw was held 21 March 2016 and the matches were played 23 April 2016.

Team 1	Score	Team 2
Lincoln Red Imps	6–2	Manchester 62
Europa FC	1–0	Lions Gibraltar

== Final ==
22 May 2016
18:00

Lincoln Red Imps	2–0	Europa FC
J. Chipolina 75'; Liam Walker 85'

Victoria Stadium
Referee: Tim Reoch - replaced by Yaro Borg (70th minute)

Lincoln Red Imps	Europa FC

GK	1	(Spain) Raúl Navas
DF	2	(Gibraltar) Jean-Carlos Garcia
DF	3	(Gibraltar) Joseph Chipolina
DF	5	(Gibraltar) Ryan Casciaro
DF	14	(Gibraltar) Roy Chipolina (c)
MF	10	(Gibraltar) Kyle Casciaro
MF	19	(Spain) Antonio Calderón Vallejo
MF	20	(Spain) Yeray Patiño
MF	86	(Portugal) Fernando Livramento
MF	88	(Gibraltar) Liam Walker
FW	7	(Gibraltar) Lee Casciaro
Substitutes:
GK	13	(Gibraltar) Bradley Banda
DF	6	(Portugal) Bernardo Lopes
DF	24	(Gibraltar) Ethan Britto
DF	26	(Gibraltar) Leon Payas
MF	12	(Gibraltar) Dean Torrilla
MF	17	(Gibraltar) Leon Clinton
FW	9	(Argentina) Guido Abayián

MF	6	(Spain) Ivan Moya
DF	7	(Spain) Antonio García Montero
MF	8	(Spain) Adrián Pavón
FW	9	(Gibraltar) Pedro Carrión
GK	13	(England) Matt Cafer
DF	14	(Spain) Toscano
MF	17	(Spain) Guillermo Roldán
MF	18	(Spain) Álex Quillo
FW	19	(Spain) Joselinho
MF	22	(Argentina) Martín Belforti
DF	40	(Spain) Alberto Merino (c)
Substitutes:
DF	2	(Spain) Chuchi
DF	3	(Gibraltar) Lance Cabezutto
MF	5	(Russia) Kirill Trofimenko
MF	10	(Spain) Javi Martinez
GK	12	(Gibraltar) Jake Victor
DF	21	(Gibraltar) Alex Vázquez
FW	23	(Romania) Lucian Burdujan

== See also ==
- 2015–16 Gibraltar Premier Division
- 2015–16 Gibraltar Second Division
