= 2017–18 Gibraltar Second Division =

Second Division
- Season: 2017–18
- Champions: Boca Gibraltar (1st title)
- Promoted: Boca Gibraltar
- Matches: 56
- Goals: 237 (4.23 per match)
- Top goalscorer: (Spain) José Valdivia (18 goals)
- Best goalkeeper: (Gibraltar) Jordan Perez (8 clean sheets)
- Biggest home win: Europa Point 8-0 Hound Dogs (16 April 2018); Leo 8-0 Cannons (29 April 2018)
- Biggest away win: Cannons 0-16 FC Olympique 13 (8 May 2018)
- Highest scoring: Cannons 0-16 FC Olympique 13 (8 May 2018)
- Longest winning run: 4 matches FC Olympique 13 / Boca
- Longest unbeaten run: 7 matches Europa Point / FC Olympique 13 / Leo
- Longest winless run: 14 matches Hound Dogs
- Longest losing run: 11 matches Hound Dogs
- All statistics correct as of 22 May 2018.

The 2017–18 Gibraltar Second Division was the fifth season of the second-tier football in Gibraltar since the Gibraltar Football Association joined UEFA. Like the previous season, this year the league was contested by 9 clubs. The season began on 26 September 2017, and ended in May 2018, with a mid-season break while Victoria Stadium underwent improvements. There was no Chesterton's Cup this season.

Gibraltar Phoenix were the reigning champions, having won the league for the first time the previous season and earning promotion to the Premier Division. Boca Gibraltar won their first title this season, securing the title by a single point after a 1–1 draw with arch-rivals Bruno's Magpies on the final day of the season.

== Format ==
Clubs play each other twice for a total of 16 matches each. The Second Division winner is promoted while the second-placed team enters a playoff with the ninth-placed team from the Premier Division. This season sees the continuation of the Home Grown Player (HPG) rule, requiring clubs to name 3 home grown players in their matchday squads with at least one of them on the field of play at all times. On 1 October, FC Olympique were awarded a 3–0 win over College 1975 after College fielded an ineligible player. The match had originally finished 2–1 to Olympique.

On 2 February 2018, Angels were expelled from the league due to violations of squad quota and Home Grown Player rules, with their record expunged.

== Teams ==
Location of the stadium where all teams play

Gibraltar Phoenix were promoted to the 2017–18 Gibraltar Premier Division as champions last season. Bruno's Magpies lost their promotion playoff, so remain in the division. Europa Pegasus had applied to join the division for the coming season after their expulsion at the end of the 2015–16 season, but the Gibraltar Football Association turned down their request, citing new rules now forbidding feeder clubs from joining the Gibraltar football pyramid.

Club	Manager	Captain	Kit supplier	Sponsor	2016–17
Angels	(Spain) Juan José Jiménez	(Spain) José Antonio Gonzalez	Sport City	Eroski Center	8th
Boca Gibraltar	(Spain) Juanjo Pomares	(Gibraltar) Liam Clarke	Nike	Coral	3rd
Bruno's Magpies	(Scotland) David Wilson	(Republic of Ireland) Ryan McCarthy	Nike	GVC Holdings; Chestertons	2nd
Cannons	(Spain) Dani Gámez	(Spain) Daniel Jimenez Falcon	Joma	Ocean Medical Clinic	4th
College 1975	(Gibraltar) Nolan Bosio	(Gibraltar) Nazim Hughes	Joma	Cosmopolitan	7th
Europa Point	(Spain) Juan Molina	(Spain) Ivan Ruiz	Luanvi	Sunborn Yacht Hotels	10th (GPD)
Hound Dogs	(Gibraltar) Chris Gomez	(Gibraltar) Ivan Borg	Joma	The Calpe Hounds	9th
Leo FC	(Spain) Norberto Alonso Simón	(Gibraltar) Angelo Lavagna	Errea		5th
Olympique 13	(Scotland) Lewis Fraser	(Gibraltar) Jordan Perez	Uhlsport	Hungry Monkey	6th

=== Managerial Changes ===
Team	Outgoing manager	Manner of departure	Date of vacancy	Position in table	Incoming manager	Date of appointment
Leo	(Spain) Rogelio Ramagge	Mutual Consent	15 June 2017	Pre-season	(Spain) Catanha	15 June 2017
Angels	(Scotland) Lewis Fraser	Resigned	21 June 2017	Pre-season	(Spain) Juan José Jiménez	1 July 2017
Olympique 13	(England) Garry Turner-Bone	Mutual consent	1 July 2017	Pre-season	(Scotland) Lewis Fraser	21 July 2017
Cannons	(Gibraltar) Christian Olivares	Moved to assistant manager	1 July 2017	Pre-season	(Spain) Dani Gámez	1 July 2016
Europa Point	(Spain) Daniel Amaya	Sacked	18 August 2017	Pre-season	(Spain) Juan Molina	18 August 2017
College 1975	(Spain) Juan Molina	Signed by Europa Point	18 August 2017	Pre-season	(Gibraltar) Nolan Bosio	20 August 2017
Leo	(Spain) Catanha	Resigned	24 August 2017	Pre-season	(Spain) Norberto Alonso Simón	27 September 2017
Leo	(Spain) Norberto Alonso Simón	Sacked	21 December 2017	9th	(Spain) Norberto Alonso Simón^{1}	12 January 2018

^{1} Norberto Alonso Simón was re-appointed by Leo in January after initially being dismissed by the new owners.

== League table ==
Pos	Team	Pld	W	D	L	GF	GA	GD	Pts	Promotion or Qualification
1	Boca Gibraltar (C, P)	14	10	1	3	37	12	+25	31	Promotion to Premier Division
2	Olympique 13 (Q)	14	9	3	2	40	8	+32	30	Qualification to play-off
3	Bruno's Magpies	14	9	3	2	46	18	+28	30	
4	Europa Point	14	7	3	4	31	18	+13	24	
5	Leo	14	6	2	6	30	31	−1	20	
6	Cannons (W)	14	6	1	7	30	53	−23	19	Folded at the end of the season
7	College 1975	14	2	0	12	14	48	−34	6	
8	Hound Dogs	14	0	1	13	9	49	−40	1	
9	Angels (E)	0	0	0	0	0	0	0	0	Club expelled, record expunged

Updated to match(es) played on 21 May 2018. Source: Gibraltar FA
Rules for classification: 1) points; 2) goal difference; 3) number of goals scored
(C) Champions; (E) Eliminated; (P) Promoted; (Q) Qualified for the phase indicated; (W) Withdrew

== Results ==
Home \ Away	ANG	BOC	BRU	CAN	COL	EPO	HOU	LEO	OLY
Angels									
Boca Gibraltar			2–1	3–2	3–0	0–1	1–0	6–0	2–1
Bruno's Magpies		1–1		3–2	8–1	2–2	5–0	3–1	2–1
Cannons		3–2	3–8		4–2	2–3	1–0	3–1	0–16
College 1975		0–1	0–5	2–3		1–4	3–2	0–3	1–3
Europa Point		0–4	0–2	3–1	4–0		8–0	2–0	0–1
Hound Dogs		1–8	1–4	2–6	2–3	0–0		1–4	0–1
Leo		0–4	2–2	8–0	3–1	3–2	4–0		0–6
Olympique 13		2–0	2–0	0–0	3–0	2–2	1–0	1–1	

Updated to match(es) played on 22 May 2018. Source: GFA
Legend: Blue = home team win; Yellow = draw; Red = away team win.

== Season statistics ==
=== Scoring ===
As of 22 May 2018

==== Top scorers ====
Rank	Player	Club	Goals
1	(Spain) José Valdivia	Boca Gibraltar	18
2	(Gibraltar) Robert Montovio	FC Olympique 13	14
2	(Gibraltar) Max Bothen	FC Olympique 13	14
4	(England) Conor Gaul	Bruno's Magpies	9
4	(Angola) Orlando João	Leo	9
6	(Spain) Samuel Mescua	Cannons	8
6	(Spain) Alexis Sanchez	Europa Point	8
6	(Timor-Leste) Tirjon Dos Santos	Leo	8
9	(Spain) Javier Rivas	Cannons	7
9	(Spain) Dani Figueroa^{1}	Leo	7

^{1}5 goals for College 1975

==== Hat-tricks ====
Player	For	Against	Result	Date
(Spain) José Valdivia	Boca Gibraltar	Leo	4–0 (A)	28 September 2017
(Gibraltar) Robert Montovio	FC Olympique 13	Leo	6–0 (A)	5 November 2017
(Spain) Yusuf Idali	Bruno's Magpies	College 1975	8–1 (H)	2 December 2017
(Spain) José Valdivia^{4}	Boca Gibraltar	Hound Dogs	8–1 (A)	3 April 2018
(Spain) Christian Nuñez^{4}	Europa Point	Hound Dogs	8–0 (H)	16 April 2018
(England) Conor Gaul^{4}	Bruno's Magpies	Cannons	8–3 (A)	22 April 2018
(Spain) José Valdivia	Boca Gibraltar	Europa Point	4–0 (A)	2 May 2018
(England) Conor Gaul	Bruno's Magpies	Hound Dogs	5–0 (H)	6 May 2018
(Gibraltar) Robert Montovio^{5}	FC Olympique 13	Cannons	16–0 (A)	8 May 2018
(Gibraltar) Max Bothen^{8}	FC Olympique 13	Cannons	16–0 (A)	8 May 2018

=== Clean sheets ===
Rank	Player	Club	Clean sheets
1	(Gibraltar) Jordan Perez	FC Olympique 13	8
2	(Spain) Alvaro Serrano	Europa Point	4
2	(Spain) Francisco José Jimenez	Angels	4
4	(Spain) Javier Gomez Fernandez	Boca Gibraltar	3
4	(England) Tom Hull	Bruno's Magpies	3
4	(Spain) Carlos Carenote	Leo	3
7	(Spain) Emmanuel Sanchez	Boca Gibraltar	2
7	(Gibraltar) Jamie Carlin	Boca Gibraltar	2
7	(Gibraltar) Stefan Mascharenhas	Cannons	2
10	(Gibraltar) Albert Chichon	Cannons	1
10	(Spain) Juan Antonio Perez	College 1975	1
10	(Spain) Salva Ballesteros	Europa Point	1
10	(Spain) Juan Carlos El Abd	Hound Dogs	1

== See also ==
- 2017–18 Gibraltar Premier Division
