= 2016–17 Gibraltar Premier Division =

Premier Division
- Season: 2016–17
- Champions: Europa (7th title)
- Relegated: Europa Point
- Champions League: Europa
- Europa League: Lincoln Red Imps; St Joseph's
- Matches: 135
- Goals: 443 (3.28 per match)
- Top goalscorer: Kike Gómez (30 goals)
- Biggest home win: Europa FC 13–1 Europa Point (19 March 2017)
- Biggest away win: Europa Point 0–15 Lincoln Red Imps (23 January 2017)
- Highest scoring: Europa Point 0–15 Lincoln Red Imps (23 January 2017)
- All statistics correct as of 22 May 2017.

The 2016–17 Gibraltar Premier Division (known as the Argus Insurance Premier Division for sponsorship reasons) was the 118th season of the national amateur and semi-professional football league in Gibraltar since its establishment - the highest level of football in Gibraltar. The league was contested by ten clubs, the top eight clubs from last season and two promoted clubs from 2015 to 2016 Gibraltar Second Division. Lincoln Red Imps were the reigning champions, sealing a record 22nd title last season. The season began on 21 September 2016 and ended on 22 May 2017. Europa won the title, ending Lincoln's 14 title run and winning their first title since 1952.

== Format ==
As with the previous season, each of the ten Premier Division teams played each other three times for a total of 27 matches each. The tenth-placed team was relegated while the ninth-placed team from the Premier Division entered a playoff with the second-placed team from the Second Division for a spot in the 2017–18 Premier Division.

Starting from this season, Gibraltar are granted two spots instead of one in the Europa League. The season also saw the introduction of a Home Grown Player (HGP) rule, forcing clubs in both of Gibraltar's divisions to have at least 3 Gibraltarian players in their matchday squads, with at least one on the field of play at all times.

== Teams ==
Location of the stadium where all teams play

After the previous season, Angels and Britannia XI were both relegated to the Second Division; Europa Point and Mons Calpe were promoted in their places.

Club	Finishing position 2015–16
Europa FC	2nd
Europa Point	1st in Second division (Promoted)
Gibraltar United	8th
Glacis United	7th
Lincoln Red Imps	1st (champions)
Lions Gibraltar	4th
Lynx	5th
Manchester 62	6th
Mons Calpe	2nd in Second division (Promoted via play-off)
St Joseph's	3rd

=== Personnel and kits ===
Note: Flags indicate national team as has been defined under FIFA eligibility rules. Players may hold more than one non-FIFA nationality.

Team	Manager	Captain	Kit manufacturer	Shirt sponsor
Europa	(Spain) Juan José Gallardo	(Spain) Javi Muñoz	Jako	Grand Home Care
Europa Point	(Spain) Daniel Amaya	(Gibraltar) Kivan Castle	Luanvi	Malaga City Academi
Gibraltar United	(Spain) Manolo Nuñez Sánchez	(Gibraltar) Robert Montovio	Nike	Sunborn / Turicum Bank
Glacis United	(Spain) Manuel Jimenez Perez	(Argentina) Leandro Pereyra	Nike	Atlantic Financial Group
Lincoln Red Imps	(Uruguay) Julio César Ribas	(Gibraltar) Roy Chipolina	Joma	U-Mee
Lions Gibraltar	(Gibraltar) Rafael Bado	(Gibraltar) Kalian Perez	Erreà	
Lynx	(Gibraltar) Albert Parody	(Gibraltar) Robert Guilling	Erreà	DS Group
Manchester 62	(Spain) Kiko Prieto	(Gibraltar) Aaron Payas	Joma	CEPSA GIB
Mons Calpe	(Italy) Mauro Ardizzone	(Argentina) Hugo Colace	Daen	Reygada Sports Group
St. Joseph's	(Spain) Raúl Procopio Baizán	(Spain) Javier López	Joma	Neptune Marine

=== Managerial Changes ===
Team	Outgoing manager	Manner of departure	Date of vacancy	Position in table	Incoming manager	Date of appointment
Lions Gibraltar	(Scotland) David Wilson	Resigned	14 September 2016	Pre-season	(Gibraltar) Rafael Bado	15 September 2016
Manchester 62	(Spain) Juan Carlos Camacho	Sacked	14 September 2016	Pre-season	(Spain) Gabino Rodríguez	15 September 2016
Europa Point	(England) George Jermy	Sacked	15 December 2016	10th	(Spain) Daniel Amaya	15 December 2016
St Joseph's	(Spain) Alfonso Cortijo	Signed by Beijing Guoan	19 December 2016	3rd	(Spain) Raúl Procopio Baizán	19 December 2016
Mons Calpe	(Brazil) William	Sacked	16 January 2017	5th	(Italy) Mauro Ardizzone	17 March 2017
Manchester 62	(Spain) Gabino Rodríguez	Sacked	8 February 2017	8th	(Spain) Carlos Inarejos	8 February 2017
Manchester 62	(Spain) Carlos Inarejos	Resigned	17 March 2017	8th	(Spain) Kiko Prieto	21 March 2017

== League table ==
Pos	Team	Pld	W	D	L	GF	GA	GD	Pts	Qualification or relegation
1	Europa FC (C)	27	24	1	2	93	18	+75	73	Qualification for the Champions League first qualifying round (Note: Europa FC qualified for the Europa League first qualifying round by winning the 2017 Rock Cup. However, since they already qualified for European competition based on their league position, the spot awarded to the cup winners was passed down the league.)
2	Lincoln Red Imps	27	23	3	1	100	16	+84	72	Qualification for the Europa League first qualifying round
3	St Joseph's	27	16	6	5	53	18	+35	54	Qualification for the Europa League first qualifying round
4	Glacis United	27	12	8	7	42	34	+8	44	
5	Mons Calpe	27	13	3	11	44	35	+9	42	
6	Lynx	27	8	4	15	34	45	−11	28	
7	Gibraltar United	27	4	9	14	20	43	−23	21	
8	Lions Gibraltar	27	4	9	14	17	54	−37	21	
9	Manchester 62 (O)	27	4	5	18	27	60	−33	17	Qualification for the play-off
10	Europa Point (R)	27	2	2	23	13	120	−107	8	Relegation to the Gibraltar Second Division

Source: UEFA, Soccerway
Rules for classification: 1) Points; 2) Goal difference; 3) Goals scored.
(C) Champions; (O) Play-off winners; (R) Relegated

== Results ==
=== Matches 1–18 ===
Teams played each other twice.

Home \ Away	EFC	EPO	GIB	GLA	LIN	LGI	LYN	MAN	MCA	SJO
Europa FC	—	2–1	3–0	4–3	1–0	2–1	3–1	8–0	2–0	1–1
Europa Point	1–4	—	1–0	1–3	0–15	1–1	0–3 (Note: Match awarded 3–0 to Lynx; the match originally finished 2–1 to Lynx.)	2–1	1–4	0–3
Gibraltar United	0–1	3–0 (Note: Match awarded 3–0 to Gibraltar United due to Europa Point failing to raise a team for the match.)	—	0–2	0–2	1–1	0–1	3–1	2–2	0–1
Glacis United	0–2	5–0	0–0	—	0–5	1–0	2–0	1–0	3–0 (Note: Match awarded 3–0 to Glacis United due to Mons Calpe breaching league rules; the match originally finished 0–0.)	0–2
Lincoln Red Imps	3–1	4–0	2–0	7–0	—	4–1	5–0	2–0	4–1	2–2
Lions Gibraltar	0–7	2–0	0–0	1–1	0–5	—	1–1	1–1	1–1	0–3
Lynx	0–7	3–0	0–1	1–1	1–2	7–2	—	2–2	0–4	1–3
Manchester 62	0–4	4–0	2–2	0–3	1–6	5–1	0–4	—	0–2	0–1
Mons Calpe	0–3	2–0	3–1	1–3	1–2	1–0	2–0	3–0	—	2–0
St Joseph's	1–4	6–0	4–1	1–1	1–2	2–0	2–1	2–0	2–0	—

Source: Gibraltar Football Association, UEFA
Legend: Blue = home team win; Yellow = draw; Red = away team win.

=== Matches 19–27 ===
Teams played each other once.

Home \ Away	EFC	EPO	GIB	GLA	LIN	LGI	LYN	MAN	MCA	SJO
Europa FC	—	13–1	7–0	—	1–4	1–0	—	—	—	2–1
Europa Point	—	—	—	1–6	—	0–1	0–3	0–6	1–6	—
Gibraltar United	—	2–2	—	2–1	0–1	—	—	—	—	0–0
Glacis United	0–2	—	—	—	—	—	1–0	1–1	1–0	—
Lincoln Red Imps	—	9–0	—	3–3	—	4–0	1–0	—	2–2	—
Lions Gibraltar	—	—	0–0	0–0	—	—	2–1	—	—	0–3
Lynx	0–1	—	1–1	—	—	—	—	1–0	2–0	—
Manchester 62	0–4	—	3–0	—	0–3	0–1	—	—	—	0–0
Mons Calpe	0–3	—	2–1	—	—	2–0	—	3–0	—	0–1
St Joseph's	—	9–0	—	0–0	0–1	—	2–0	—	—	—

Source: Gibraltar Football Association, UEFA
Legend: Blue = home team win; Yellow = draw; Red = away team win.

== Promotion/relegation play-off ==
At the end of the season, the ninth-placed team from the Premier Division will enter a play-off with the second-placed team from the Second Division for a spot in the 2017–18 Premier Division. FCB Magpies finished second in the Second Division after their win on May 8, 2017.

30 May 2017
20:00 CEST

Manchester 62	3–1	FCB Magpies
Diaz 6'; Payas 29'; Pacheco 35'	Report	Busumbru 70'

Victoria Stadium, Gibraltar
Referee: Yaroslaff Borg

== Top goalscorers ==
As of 22 May 2017

Rank	Player	Club	Goals
1	(Philippines) Kike Gómez	Europa FC	30
2	(Gibraltar) Joseph Chipolina	Lincoln Red Imps	17
3	(Gibraltar) John-Paul Duarte	St. Joseph's	15
3	(Spain) Guillermo Roldán	Europa FC	15
3	(Gibraltar) Liam Walker	Europa FC	15
6	(Gibraltar) Lee Casciaro	Lincoln Red Imps	14
7	(Gibraltar) George Cabrera	Lincoln Red Imps	13
8	(Spain) Salvador Carrasco Lopez	Glacis United	11
8	(Argentina) Juan Pablo Pereira Sastrie	Mons Calpe	11
10	(Argentina) Tulio Etchemaite	Lincoln Red Imps	10

== See also ==
- 2016–17 Gibraltar Second Division
