= 2018–19 Gibraltar Second Division =

Second Division
- Season: 2018–19
- Dates: 15 August 2018 – 25 May 2019
- Champions: Bruno's Magpies (1st title)
- Matches: 63
- Goals: 311 (4.94 per match)
- Top goalscorer: (Brazil) Matheus Assumpção (28 goals)
- Best goalkeeper: (Gibraltar) Christian Lopez (Canada) Nicolas Milli (4 clean sheets)
- Biggest home win: Bruno's Magpies 13–0 Hound Dogs (1 April 2019)
- Biggest away win: College 1975 0–9 Manchester 62 (14 April 2019)
- Highest scoring: Olympique 13 12–2 Hound Dogs (2 May 2019)
- Longest winning run: 5 matches Bruno's Magpies; Europa Point
- Longest unbeaten run: 10 matches Bruno's Magpies
- Longest winless run: 18 matches Hound Dogs
- Longest losing run: 6 matches Hound Dogs
- All statistics correct as of 25 May 2019.

The 2018–19 Gibraltar Second Division was the sixth and final season of the second tier football in Gibraltar since the Gibraltar Football Association joined UEFA. The season began on 15 August 2018. After the expulsion of Angels the previous season and withdrawal of Cannons, the league was contested by 7 clubs.

This season saw the return of the Second Division Cup after stadium renovations saw the tournament scrapped the previous year. The tournament took place during a mid-season break from 17 December 2018 until 9 March 2019. Boca Gibraltar were the reigning champions, earning promotion to the 2018–19 Gibraltar Premier Division.

There was no promotion after the completion of this season due to the merger of Gibraltar's football leagues to form the new Gibraltar National League.

== Format ==
Clubs played each other three times for a total of 18 matches each, with a break in mid-season for clubs to contest the Chesterton's Cup.

This season saw an expansion of the Home Grown Player (HPG) rule, which required clubs to name a minimum of 4 home grown players in their matchday squads with at least three of them on the field of play at all times.

== Teams ==
Location of the stadium where all teams play

Boca Gibraltar were promoted to the 2018–19 Gibraltar Premier Division as champions last season. FC Olympique 13 lost their promotion playoff, so remained in the division. Manchester 62 were relegated to the Second Division after finishing bottom of the 2017–18 Gibraltar Premier Division. Cannons folded and withdrew from the league after the end of the season, while Angels were not re-admitted following their expulsion, leaving the Second Division with just seven teams.

Club	Manager	Captain	Kit supplier	Sponsor	2017–18
Bruno's Magpies	(Scotland) David Wilson	(Scotland) Ross Gray	Nike	GVC Holdings; Chestertons	3rd
College 1975	(Gibraltar) Nolan Bosio	(Gibraltar) Nazim Hughes	Joma		7th
Europa Point	(Spain) José Ramón Rojas Escalona	(Spain) Gerardo López	Luanvi	Sunborn Yacht Hotels	4th
Hound Dogs	(Gibraltar) Chris Gomez	(Gibraltar) Jesse Moonilall	Joma	The Calpe Hounds	8th
Leo FC	(Spain) Francisco Sanchez	(France) Clément Loubière	Errea		5th
Manchester 62	(Gibraltar) Jonathan Sodi	(Argentina) Christian Toncheff	Joma	CEPSA GIB	10th, GPD
Olympique 13	(Germany) Ángel Parla-Díaz	(Gibraltar) Andrew Lopez	Uhlsport	Hungry Monkey	2nd

=== Managerial changes ===
Team	Outgoing manager	Manner of departure	Date of vacancy	Position in table	Incoming manager	Date of appointment
Europa Point	(Spain) Juan Molina	End of contract	10 June 2018	Pre-season	(United States) Brett Jacobs	1 July 2018
Leo	(Spain) Norberto Alonso	Resigned	10 June 2018	Pre-season	(Spain) Rogelio Ramagge	26 June 2018
FC Olympique 13	(Scotland) Lewis Fraser	Signed by Mons Calpe	10 June 2018	Pre-season	(Spain) Norberto Alonso	23 July 2018
FC Olympique 13	(Spain) Norberto Alonso	Resigned	23 November 2018	4th	(Germany) Ángel Parla-Díaz	24 November 2018
Leo	(Spain) Rogelio Ramagge	Resigned	1 December 2018	6th	(Spain) Francisco Sanchez	2 December 2018
Europa Point	(United States) Brett Jacobs	Resigned	December 2018	4th	(Spain) José Ramón Rojas Escalona	December 2018

== League table ==
Pos	Team	Pld	W	D	L	GF	GA	GD	Pts
1	Bruno's Magpies (C)	18	15	2	1	91	19	+72	47
2	Europa Point	18	13	0	5	50	26	+24	39
3	Olympique 13	18	12	1	5	71	33	+38	37
4	Manchester 62	18	12	1	5	54	27	+27	37
5	College 1975	18	3	2	13	13	62	−49	11
6	Leo	18	3	1	14	23	62	−39	10
7	Hound Dogs	18	0	3	15	9	82	−73	3

Source: Gibraltar FA
Rules for classification: 1) points; 2) goal difference; 3) number of goals scored
(C) Champions

== Results ==
=== Matches 1–12 ===
Home \ Away	BRU	COL	EPO	HOU	LEO	MAN	OLY
Bruno's Magpies		6–0	3–1	13–0	6–2	4–1	2–2
College 1975	1–6		0–4	0–0	0–1	1–2	0–8
Europa Point	2–4	4–1		4–0	1–0	0–3	5–2
Hound Dogs	0–7	0–3	1–8		1–2	0–5	1–3
Leo	1–8	1–2	0–3	0–0		1–7	2–6
Manchester 62	0–3	2–0	0–1	3–0	2–1		3–2
Olympique 13	4–1	6–0	2–3	3–1	7–1	0–2	

Source: Gibraltar FA
Legend: Blue = home team win; Yellow = draw; Red = away team win.

=== Matches 13–18 ===
Home \ Away	BRU	COL	EPO	HOU	LEO	MAN	OLY
Bruno's Magpies		8–1				1–1	3–1
College 1975			1–3			0–9	0–1
Europa Point	1–3			4–0	3–2		
Hound Dogs	0–6	1–1			0–4		
Leo	1–7	0–2					1–3
Manchester 62			1–2	4–2	4–3		
Olympique 13			3–1	12–2		6–5	

Source: Gibraltar FA
Legend: Blue = home team win; Yellow = draw; Red = away team win.

== Season statistics ==
As of 25 May 2019.

=== Top scorers ===
Rank	Player	Club	Goals
1	(Brazil) Matheus Assumpção	Bruno's Magpies	28
2	(Gibraltar) Robert Montovio^{1}	Manchester 62	16
3	(Gibraltar) Julian Lopez	Europa Point	14
4	(Gibraltar) Andrew Lopez	FC Olympique 13	13
5	(Spain) Alejandro Carenote	FC Olympique 13	12
6	(Canada) Alex Dimitriu	Bruno's Magpies	11
6	(Gibraltar) Lython Marquez	Manchester 62	11
8	(England) Finnlay Wyatt	Bruno's Magpies	10
9	(Spain) Fernando Cuesta	Bruno's Magpies	9
10	(Spain) Fiera	FC Olympique 13	7
10	(England) Thomas Parry	Bruno's Magpies	7
10	(Spain) Riki Rojo	FC Olympique 13	7

^{1} Robert Montovio scored 4 goals for Europa Point before transferring to Manchester 62.

=== Hat-tricks ===
Player	For	Against	Result	Date
(Gibraltar) Lance Cabezutto	Olympique 13	Leo	6–2 (A)	19 August 2018
(Spain) Fiera	Olympique 13	Hound Dogs	3–1 (H)	30 August 2018
(Gibraltar) Kelvin Morgan	Bruno's Magpies	Hound Dogs	7–0 (A)	4 November 2018
(Gibraltar) Andrew Lopez	Olympique 13	Leo	7–1 (H)	8 November 2018
(Spain) Riki Rojo	Olympique 13	Leo	7–1 (H)	8 November 2018
(Brazil) Matheus Assumpção	Bruno's Magpies	College 1975	6–1 (A)	10 November 2018
(Gibraltar) Andrew Lopez	Olympique 13	College 1975	6–0 (H)	9 December 2018
(Gibraltar) Lython Marquez	Manchester 62	Hound Dogs	5–0 (A)	17 December 2018
(Brazil) Matheus Assumpção^{6}	Bruno's Magpies	Hound Dogs	13–0 (H)	1 April 2019
(Canada) Alex Dimitriu	Bruno's Magpies	Hound Dogs	13–0 (H)	1 April 2019
(Spain) Fernando Cuesta	Bruno's Magpies	College 1975	8–1 (H)	7 April 2019
(Gibraltar) Lython Marquez^{4}	Manchester 62	College 1975	9–0 (A)	14 April 2019
(Gibraltar) Andrew Lopez	Olympique 13	Hound Dogs	12–2 (H)	2 May 2019
(Spain) Alejandro Carenote^{6}	Olympique 13	Hound Dogs	12–2 (H)	2 May 2019
(Gibraltar) Julian Lopez^{4}	Europa Point	Hound Dogs	8-1 (A)	11 May 2019
(Spain) Samuel Fernández	Manchester 62	Leo	7-1 (A)	12 May 2019
(Gibraltar) Paul Podesta	Bruno's Magpies	Leo	7-1 (A)	15 May 2019
(Gibraltar) Robert Montovio	Manchester 62	Leo	4-3 (H)	May 21, 2019
(Brazil) Matheus Assumpção	Bruno's Magpies	Hound Dogs	6–0 (A)	24 May 2019

=== Clean sheets ===
Rank	Player	Club	Games
1	(Gibraltar) Christian Lopez	Manchester 62	4
1	(Canada) Nicolas Milli	Europa Point	4
3	(Spain) Juan Carlos Bedmar^{1}	Manchester 62	3
3	(England) Tom Hull	Bruno's Magpies	3
5	(Spain) Salvador Becerra	Europa Point	2
5	(Gibraltar) Kayne Burrell	College 1975	2
5	(Spain) Juan Carcaño Blanco	Hound Dogs	2
5	(United States) Ryan MacArthur	Bruno's Magpies	2
9	(Spain) Alejandro Arroyal	College 1975	1
9	(Gibraltar) Kenneth Cruz	FC Olympique 13	1
9	(Spain) Juanfran	FC Olympique 13	1
9	(Spain) Francisco Mancilla	Europa Point	1
9	(Spain) David Moreno	FC Olympique 13	1
9	(Spain) Francisco Moreno	Leo	1
9	(Gibraltar) Tito Podesta	Bruno's Magpies	1

^{1} Juan Carlos Bedmar kept 2 clean sheets for Leo before transferring to Manchester 62.

== End-of-season awards ==
End of season awards were handed out by Football Gibraltar, the Gibraltar Football Association's official UEFA correspondents, on 2 June.

Award	Winner	Club
Manager of the Season	(Scotland) David Wilson	Bruno's Magpies
Player of the Season	(Brazil) Matheus Assumpção	Bruno's Magpies
Young Player of the Season	(Nigeria) Godwin Egbo	Olympique 13

== See also ==
- 2018–19 Gibraltar Premier Division
- 2018–19 Gibraltar Intermediate League
