= 2015 Rock Cup =

Tournament details
- Country: Gibraltar
- Teams: 22

Final positions
- Champions: Lincoln Red Imps
- Runners-up: Lynx

Tournament statistics
- Matches played: 21
- Goals scored: 73 (3.48 per match)

The first match of the 2015 Rock Cup was played 7 January 2015.

The winner of the tournament (Lincoln) qualified for the 2015–16 UEFA Europa League and would have entered the tournament in the first qualifying round. Since Lincoln also won the 2014–15 Gibraltar Premier Division, the place reserved for the cup winner went to the second place team in the league.

== First round ==
The First Round draw was held 2 December 2014. All teams in this round were Gibraltar Second Division teams. Red Imps and Gibraltar Phoenix received a bye to the next round.

Team 1	Score	Team 2
Angels	1–1 (5–4 p)	Mons Calpe
Gibraltar United	1–0	Leo
Pegasus	0–8	Gibraltar Scorpions
Cannons	0–7	Europa Point
Olympique 13	0–1	Boca Juniors
Hound Dogs	2–3	Bruno's Magpies

== Second round ==
The second round draw was held after the completion of the first round. Red Imps couldn't field a team.

Team 1	Score	Team 2
Lynx	5–0	Boca Juniors Gibraltar
College Europa	2–1	Manchester 62
Lions Gibraltar	2–0	Glacis United
Gibraltar United	1–6	Lincoln Red Imps
Red Imps	0–3 w/o	Gibraltar Scorpions
Angels	0–2	Britannia XI
St Joseph's	3–0	Bruno's Magpies
Europa Point	5–0	Gibraltar Phoenix

== Quarter-finals ==
Matches were played 13 to 15 March.

Team 1	Score	Team 2
St Joseph's	2–1	Lions Gibraltar
Britannia XI	2–0	Gibraltar Scorpions
Europa Point	1–2	Lynx
College Europa	0–1	Lincoln Red Imps

== Semi-finals ==
The semi-final draw was held 19 March 2015. Both matches were played 25 April 2015.

Team 1	Score	Team 2
Lincoln Red Imps	2–0	St Joseph's
Britannia XI	1–2	Lynx

== Final ==
The final was played on 30 May 2015.

Team 1	Score	Team 2
Lincoln Red Imps	4–1	Lynx
