= 2014–15 Gibraltar Premier Division =

Premier Division
- Season: 2014–15
- Champions: Lincoln Red Imps (21st title)
- Relegated: None
- Champions League: Lincoln Red Imps
- Europa League: College Europa
- Matches: 84
- Goals: 253 (3.01 per match)
- Top goalscorer: Lee Casciaro (20 goals)
- Biggest home win: Lincoln Red Imps 7–0 Britannia XI (9 January 2015)
- Biggest away win: Britannia XI 0–9 College Europa (1 November 2014); Lions Gibraltar 0–9 Lincoln Red Imps (23 May 2015)
- Highest scoring: Britannia XI 0–9 College Europa (1 November 2014); Lions Gibraltar 0–9 Lincoln Red Imps (23 May 2015)
- All statistics correct as of 26 May 2015.

The 2014–15 Gibraltar Premier Division (known as the Argus Insurance Premier Division for sponsorship reasons) was the 116th season of the national amateur football league in Gibraltar since its establishment - the highest level of football in Gibraltar. The league was contested by eight clubs, like last year, a requirement for entry into UEFA competitions. Lincoln Red Imps are the reigning champions, sealing a record 20th title last season.

== Teams ==
Location of the stadium which all teams play in

After the 2013–14 season, Gibraltar Phoenix were relegated from the league without registering a single point. FC Britannia XI were promoted as champions of the Gibraltar Second Division.

Club	Finishing position 2013–14
College Europa	4th
FC Britannia XI	1st in Gibraltar Second Division (promoted)
Glacis United	5th
Lincoln Red Imps	1st (champions)
Lions Gibraltar	6th
Lynx	3rd
Manchester 62	2nd
St Joseph's	7th

=== Personnel and kits ===
Note: Flags indicate national team as has been defined under FIFA eligibility rules. Players may hold more than one non-FIFA nationality.

Team	Manager	Captain	Kit manufacturer	Shirt sponsor
College Europa	(Spain) José Requena	(Gibraltar) Robert Montovio	Nike	Cancer Relief Gibraltar
FC Britannia XI	(Spain) Juan Luis Pérez Herrera	(Gibraltar) Liam Roche	Joma	O'Reillys English Pub
Glacis United	(Spain) Javier Sánchez Alfaro	(Gibraltar) Al Greene	Nike	
Lincoln	(Spain) Raúl Procopio	(Gibraltar) Roy Chipolina	Joma	OSG Security
Lions Gibraltar	(England) Jeff Wood	(Gibraltar) Jansen Dalli	Errea	Mitsubishi
Lynx	(Gibraltar) Albert Parody	(Gibraltar) Leonardo Federico Vela	Adidas	Trends
Manchester 62	(Gibraltar) Aaron Asquez	(Gibraltar) Matt Reoch	Joma	CEPSA GIB
St. Joseph's	(Gibraltar) Jerry Aguilera	(Gibraltar) Kaaron Macedo	Adidas	Bonmilk

=== Managerial changes ===
Team	Outgoing manager	Manner of departure	Date of vacancy	Position in table	Incoming manager	Date of appointment
College Europa	(Spain) Juan Luis Pérez Herrera	Sacked	24 May 2014	Pre-season	(Spain) José Requena	24 May 2014
FC Britannia XI	(Gibraltar) James Munden	Resigned	25 May 2014	Pre-season	(Spain) Juan Luis Pérez Herrera	3 July 2014
Lions Gibraltar	(Gibraltar) Steve Cummings	Resigned	7 July 2014	Pre-season	(England) Jeff Wood	17 July 2014
Lincoln Red Imps	(Gibraltar) Mike McElwee	Resigned	17 July 2014	Pre-season	(Spain) Raúl Procopio Baizán	21 July 2014

== League table ==
Pos	Team	Pld	W	D	L	GF	GA	GD	Pts	Qualification or relegation
1	Lincoln Red Imps (C)	21	19	1	1	80	12	+68	58	Qualification for the Champions League first qualifying round
2	College Europa	21	12	6	3	42	14	+28	42	Qualification for the Europa League first qualifying round (Note: Since the 2015 Rock Cup winners, Lincoln Red Imps, qualified for the Champions League by winning the league, the Rock Cup's Europa League spot was transferred to the league's second-placed team.)
3	Lynx	21	10	8	3	36	18	+18	38	
4	St Joseph's	21	12	2	7	36	18	+18	38	
5	Manchester 62	21	7	6	8	22	25	−3	27	
6	Glacis United	21	4	3	14	14	50	−36	15	
7	Britannia XI	21	2	3	16	13	67	−54	9	
8	Lions Gibraltar	21	1	5	15	9	48	−39	8	

Source: UEFA
Rules for classification: 1) points; 2) goal difference; 3) number of goals scored
(C) Champions

== Results ==
Teams in the 2014–15 season played each other three times, with the season starting 19 September 2014. For each match a home and an away team was named, however all matches were played at Victoria Stadium

=== Matches 1–14 ===
Teams played each other twice.

Home \ Away	BRI	EFC	GLA	LIN	LGI	LYN	MAN	SJO
Britannia XI		0–9	1–2	0–2	1–3	0–3	0–1	1–2
Europa FC	0–0		6–0	2–2	3–0	1–0	0–0	2–0
Glacis United	1–1	0–1		0–1	0–0	1–3	0–1	1–5
Lincoln	7–0	3–0	6–1		4–0	0–1	2–1	2–0
Lions Gibraltar	1–1	0–2	1–2	0–3		1–1	0–1	0–2
Lynx	2–1	1–1	4–0	1–6	0–0		1–1	0–0
Manchester 62	5–2	1–1	1–2	1–3	4–0	0–1		0–0
St Joseph's	4–0	0–1	4–0	2–4	4–0	1–2	2–0	

Source: uefa.com
Legend: Blue = home team win; Yellow = draw; Red = away team win.

=== Matches 15–21 ===
Teams played each other once.

Home \ Away	BRI	EFC	GLA	LIN	LGI	LYN	MAN	SJO
Britannia XI		0–5		0–7		0–8		1–2
Europa FC			2–1		3–0	0–0	3–0	
Glacis United	0–1			0–4				0–2
Lincoln		5–0				4–1	4–1	2–1
Lions Gibraltar	1–2		0–2	0–9				
Lynx			5–0		1–1			1–0
Manchester 62	2–1		1–1		1–0	0–0		
St Joseph's		1–0			2–1		2–0	

Legend: Blue = home team win; Yellow = draw; Red = away team win.

== Premier Division play-off ==
In the previous Gibraltar Premier Division season, promotion and relegation deciding a place in the Premier Division for the following year was determined by a play-off match. A play-off match at the end of the current season was planned to be played between the 7th placed team from the 2014–15 Premier Division and the 2nd placed from the 2014–15 Second Division. The winner of the match would have earned a spot in the 2015–16 Gibraltar Premier Division. However, no relegation match took place as the Premier Division expands to 10 teams for next season.

== Top goalscorers ==
As of 26 May 2015

Rank	Player	Club	Goals
1	(Gibraltar) Lee Casciaro	Lincoln	20
2	(Argentina) Cristian Toncheff	College Europa	14
3	(Gibraltar) Liam Walker	Lincoln	13
3	(Gibraltar) Joseph Chipolina	Lincoln	13
5	(Spain) José Luis Romero	St Joseph's	11
6	(Netherlands) Raducio King	Lynx	10
6	(Gibraltar) John-Paul Duarte	Lincoln	10
8	(Spain) Juanse Pegalajar	College Europa	7
9	(Gibraltar) Kyle Casciaro	Lincoln	6
9	(Argentina) Emmanuel Alexis Cristori	Lincoln	6
