= Cannons F.C. =

Former association football club in Gibraltar

Cannons
- Full name: Cannons Football Club
- Founded: 2008
- Dissolved: 2018
- Ground: Victoria Stadium, Gibraltar
- Capacity: 2000
- Manager: Dani Gámez
- League: Gibraltar Second Division
- 2017–18: 6th
Home colours	Away colours

Cannons F.C. was a football team from Gibraltar. They played in the Gibraltar Second Division and the Rock Cup.

== History ==
Cannons FC was founded in 2008. The club spent the majority of its history as the territory's "whipping boys", often finishing at the bottom of the Gibraltar Second Division. After another disappointing season in 2015–16, only finishing ahead of new team College 1975, the club overhauled its squad, benefiting from the dissolution of rivals Pegasus, Red Imps and FC Britannia by signing numerous players from the folded sides. The turnaround of playing staff paid dividends as the side entered the New Year of the 2016–17 season in third place, eventually finishing a comfortable 4th. The team went on to lead the Second Division at the start of the winter break in the 2017–18 season, however, the expulsion of Angels allowed other teams to overtake them. Following a subsequent loss of form and lack of commitment from players, heavy defeats in the final 2 games led to a 6th-place finish, below Leo who had entered the winter break with 0 points. The club folded at the end of the season.

=== List of seasons ===
Season	Division	League record								Rock Cup
Season	Division	P	W	D	L	GF	GA	Pts	Pos	Rock Cup
2008–09	Second	13	3	0	10	12	63	9	13th	Second round
2009–10	Second	13	4	3	6	20	29	15	10th	First round
2010–11	Second	22	1	0	21	10	80	3	12th	Quarter-final
2011–12	Second	18	2	2	14	16	58	8	10th	—
2012–13	Second	18	1	2	15	14	73	5	10th	First round
2013–14	Second	22	4	5	13	37	64	17	12th	Second round
2014–15	Second	26	3	0	23	21	131	9	14th	First round
2015–16	Second	22	4	1	17	23	60	13	11th	First round
2016–17	Second	16	7	3	6	33	29	24	4th	Second round
2017–18	Second	14	6	1	7	30	53	19	6th	Quarter-final

== Final squad ==
Note: Flags indicate national team as defined under FIFA eligibility rules; some limited exceptions apply. Players may hold more than one non-FIFA nationality.

No.	Pos.	Nation	Player
1	GK	GIB	Albert Chichon
2	DF	ESP	Daniel Jimenez Falcon (captain)
3	DF	GIB	James Danino
4	DF	ESP	Guillermo Pérez
5	DF	ESP	Isaac Cereto
6	DF	ESP	Samuel Fernandez
7	MF	ESP	Pau Escobar
8	MF	ESP	Adrian Reina
9	FW	ESP	Javier Rivas
10	MF	ESP	Francisco Diaz
11	MF	ESP	Daniel Guerrero
12	DF	ESP	Tyrone Ruiz Mota

No.	Pos.	Nation	Player
14	DF	GIB	John Guzman
15	FW	ESP	José Del Rio
16	DF	ESP	Juanjo Ruesca
17	FW	ESP	Ismael Ruesca
18	DF	ESP	Pedro Rivas
19	DF	ENG	Aaron Edwards
20	FW	ESP	Samuel Mescua
21	MF	ESP	Juan Carlos Pineda
22	DF	GIB	Christian Olivares (player-assistant manager)
24	FW	ESP	Juan José Fernandez
26	GK	GIB	Stefan Mascharenhas
