= 2015–16 Gibraltar Premier Division =

Premier Division
- Season: 2015–16
- Champions: Lincoln Red Imps
- Relegated: Angels; Britannia XI
- Champions League: Lincoln Red Imps
- Europa League: Europa FC
- Matches: 135
- Goals: 509 (3.77 per match)
- Top goalscorer: Pedro Carrión Padial (29 goals)
- Biggest home win: Lincoln Red Imps 13–1 Angels (30 April 2016)
- Biggest away win: Britannia XI 1–16 Europa FC (7 May 2016)
- Highest scoring: Britannia XI 1–16 Europa FC (7 May 2016)
- All statistics correct as of 16 May 2016.

The 2015–16 Gibraltar Premier Division (known as the Argus Insurance Premier Division for sponsorship reasons) was the 117th season of the national amateur and semi-professional football league in Gibraltar since its establishment - the highest level of football in Gibraltar. The league was contested by ten clubs, expanded from eight clubs in the last two seasons, including all clubs from last season and two promoted clubs from 2014–15 Gibraltar Second Division. The winner of the Gibraltar Premier Division, Lincoln Red Imps was allocated a spot in Champions League qualification, and as they won the Rock Cup a spot in the Europa League was given to the runners-up Europa FC.

Lincoln Red Imps were the reigning champions, sealing a record 21st title last season. The Gibraltar football season kicked off with the Pepe Reyes Cup between Lincoln and Europa FC, which Lincoln won 3–2 after extra time. The season proper kicked off on the following Friday, September 25, with St Joseph's facing Lions.

== Format ==
Each of the ten Premier Division teams will play each other three times for a total of 27 matches each. It is expected that the tenth-placed team will be relegated while the ninth-placed team from the Premier Division will enter a playoff with the second-placed team from the Second Division for a spot in the 2016–17 Premier Division.

== Teams ==
Location of the stadium where all teams play

After the 2014–15 season no teams were relegated, and both Gibraltar United and Angels were promoted as champions and runners-up of the 2014–15 Gibraltar Second Division, when the league expands to ten teams this season.

Club	Finishing position 2014–15
Angels	2nd in Second division (Promoted)
Britannia XI	7th
Europa FC (Note: Club changed name from College Europa FC to Europa FC starting this season)	2nd
Gibraltar United	1st in Second division (Promoted)
Glacis United	6th
Lincoln Red Imps	1st (champions)
Lions Gibraltar	8th
Lynx	3rd
Manchester 62	5th
St Joseph's	4th

== League table ==
Pos	Team	Pld	W	D	L	GF	GA	GD	Pts	Qualification or relegation
1	Lincoln Red Imps (C)	27	25	1	1	130	9	+121	76	Qualification for the Champions League first qualifying round (Note: Lincoln Red Imps qualified for the Europa League first qualifying round by winning the 2016 Rock Cup. However, since they already qualified for European competition based on their league position, the spot awarded to the cup winners was passed down the league.)
2	Europa FC	27	21	2	4	82	18	+64	65	Qualification for the Europa League first qualifying round
3	St Joseph's	27	14	3	10	50	37	+13	45	
4	Lions Gibraltar	27	14	3	10	49	44	+5	45	
5	Lynx	27	11	2	14	37	40	−3	35	
6	Manchester 62	27	9	5	13	41	49	−8	32	
7	Glacis United	27	10	2	15	40	67	−27	32	
8	Gibraltar United	27	9	2	16	28	57	−29	29	
9	Britannia XI (R)	27	8	2	17	35	84	−49	26	Qualification for the play-off
10	Angels (R)	27	3	0	24	20	107	−87	9	Relegation to the Gibraltar Second Division

Source: UEFA, Soccerway
Rules for classification: 1) Points; 2) Goal difference; 3) Goals scored.
(C) Champions; (R) Relegated

== Results ==
=== Matches 1–18 ===
Teams play each other twice.

Home \ Away	ANG	BRI	EFC	GIB	GLA	LIN	LGI	LYN	MAN	SJO
Angels		0–3	2–3	1–2	0–3	0–13	0–3	1–2	1–5	0–3
Britannia XI	3–1		1–4	1–1	2–3	0–1	0–4	0–1	0–2	4–3
Europa FC	3–0	10–1		2–0	6–0	1–1	2–0	2–1	4–0	2–0
Gibraltar United	1–2	1–3	0–2		1–0	0–6	1–0	0–3	1–0	0–2
Glacis United	0–2	0–3	0–2	1–2		1–6	6–0	0–2	1–1	3–5
Lincoln	5–0	3–2	2–0	7–0	11–0		4–0	4–0	4–0	4–0
Lions Gibraltar	2–0	1–0	0–3	3–0	5–0	0–2		1–1	0–1	3–1
Lynx	6–0	0–3	1–2	3–0	0–1	0–2	1–2		2–2	1–0
Manchester 62	4–1	0–2	1–1	1–0	1–0	0–4	2–3	1–2		0–1
St Joseph's	4–0	1–1	3–1	4–0	3–0	0–2	1–1	1–0	2–0	

Updated to match(es) played on 22 February 2016. Source: uefa.com
Legend: Blue = home team win; Yellow = draw; Red = away team win.

=== Matches 19–27 ===
Teams play each other once.

Home \ Away	ANG	BRI	EFC	GIB	GLA	LIN	LGI	LYN	MAN	SJO
Angels			0–3	1–7			0–1	1–2	1–6	
Britannia XI	4–3		1–16	0–2			1–4	0–2		
Europa FC					0–1	2–0	0–1		5–0	2–1
Gibraltar United			1–3		0–2				2–2	1–3
Glacis United	6–1	1–0				1–4		2–1		
Lincoln	13–1	10–0		4–0				4–0		
Lions Gibraltar				1–3	6–3	1–7		4–1		
Lynx			0–1	0–1					2–0	2–4
Manchester 62		6–0			1–3	0–4	2–2			3–0
St Joseph's	0–1	4–0			2–2	0–3	2–1			

Updated to match(es) played on 16 May 2016. Source: uefa.com
Legend: Blue = home team win; Yellow = draw; Red = away team win.

=== Top goalscorers ===
As of 16 May 2016

Rank	Player	Club	Goals
1	(Spain) Pedro Carrión Padial	Europa FC	29
2	(Gibraltar) George Cabrera	Lincoln Red Imps	24
3	(Argentina) Guido Abayián	Lincoln Red Imps	20
4	(Spain) Sergio Gines	Lions Gibraltar	19
5	(Gibraltar) Kyle Casciaro	Lincoln Red Imps	17
5	(Gibraltar) Lee Casciaro	Lincoln Red Imps	17
7	(Gibraltar) Joseph Chipolina	Lincoln Red Imps	16
7	(Argentina) Cristian Toncheff	Manchester 62	16
7	(Spain) Juan Pablo Pereira Sastrie	Lynx/Glacis United	16
10	(Gibraltar) Robert Montovio	Gibraltar United	15

== Promotion/relegation play-off ==
At the end of the season, the ninth-placed team from the Premier Division, Britannia XI, entered a play-off with Mons Calpe, the second-placed team from the Second Division for a spot in the 2016–17 Premier Division.

31 May 2016
20:30 CEST

Britannia XI	1–2	Mons Calpe
Gilroy 2'	Report	V. Gonzalez 50', 52'

Victoria Stadium, Gibraltar

Mons Calpe are promoted to the 2016–17 Gibraltar Premier Division.

== See also ==
- 2015–16 Gibraltar Second Division
