= Matt Reoch =

Gibraltarian former footballer (born 1983)

Personal information
- Full name: Matthew Alfred Reoch
- Date of birth: 25 February 1983 (age 43)
- Place of birth: Gibraltar
- Position: Defender

Senior career*
Years	Team	Apps	(Gls)
1995–2013	Manchester United (Gibraltar) (Note: Pre-UEFA. Gibraltar football stats before 2013 are unknown)	–	(–)
2013–2016	Manchester 62	16	(0)
2016–2017	FC Olympique 13	7	(1)

International career
2014–	Gibraltar	1	(0)
- * Club domestic league appearances and goals as of 18:20, 6 March 2014 (UTC)

Matthew Alfred Reoch (born 25 February 1983) is a Gibraltarian former footballer who last played for Gibraltar Second Division side FC Olympique 13 and the Gibraltar national team, where he played as a defender.

He is the son of a former Gibraltar Football Association president Desmond Reoch (1954–2018).

== International career ==
Santos was first called up to the Gibraltar senior team in February 2014 for friendlies against Faroe Islands and Estonia on 1 and 5 March 2014. He made his international début with Gibraltar on 5 March 2014 in a 2–0 home loss to Estonia.

=== International statistics ===
As of 5 March 2014.

National team	Season	Apps	Goals
Gibraltar	2014	1	0
Total		1	0
