= Roy Chipolina =

Gibraltarian footballer (born 1983)

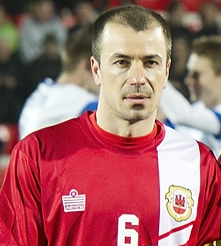
- Chipolina with Gibraltar in 2014

Personal information
- Full name: Roy Alan Chipolina
- Date of birth: 20 January 1983 (age 43)
- Place of birth: Enfield, England
- Height: 5 ft 10 in (1.78 m)
- Position: Defender

Youth career
- Southgate Saints
- 2000–2003: Lincoln Red Imps

Senior career*
Years	Team	Apps	(Gls)
2003–2006	Rock Wolves		
2006–2024	Lincoln Red Imps (Note: Lincoln stats before 2013 are unknown)	153	(24)

International career
2001–2013	Gibraltar XI (Non-FIFA)	15	(15)
2013–2024	Gibraltar	75	(5)
- * Club domestic league appearances and goals

Roy Alan Chipolina (born 20 January 1983) is a Gibraltarian former professional footballer who played as a defender for Lincoln Red Imps. Born in England, he played for the Gibraltar national team, for which he served as captain.

== Club career ==
Chipolina has played for Rock Wolves between 2003 and 2006, and then Gibraltar Premier Division side Lincoln Red Imps since 2006. He became the first Gibraltarian, and oldest player, to score in the fledgling UEFA Europa Conference League when he scored in a 4–1 defeat to Slovan Bratislava on 4 November 2021.

He announced his retirement from football on 9 October 2024.

== International career ==
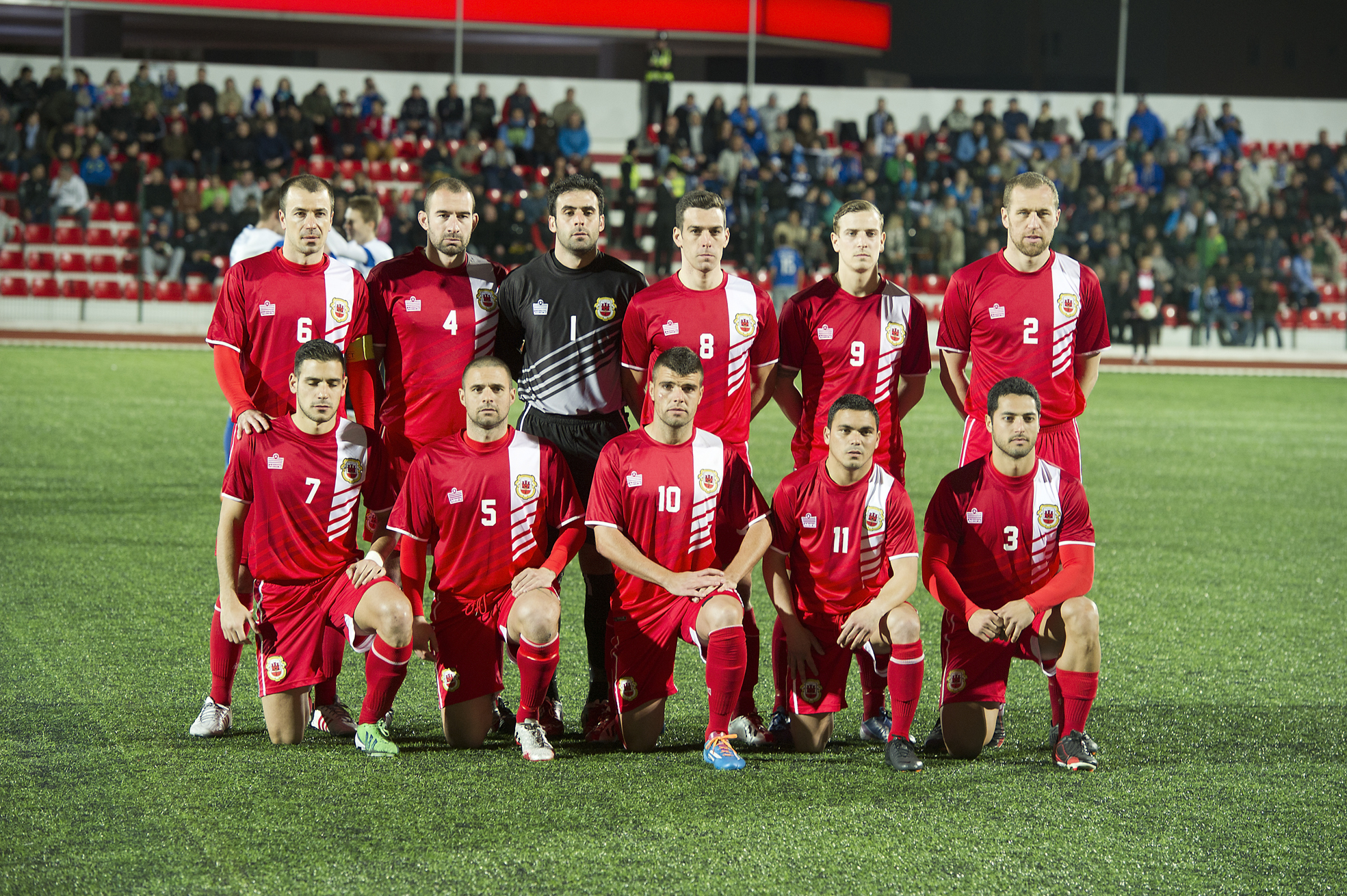
Chipolina (in first place) in the line-up as captain of Gibraltar in 2014

Chipolina made his international debut with the Gibraltar national team on 18 November 2013 in a 0–0 home draw with Slovakia, Gibraltar's first game since being admitted to UEFA. Chipolina scored Gibraltar's first UEFA goal, in their second official game, on 1 March 2014 against the Faroe Islands at Victoria Stadium, which they lost 4–1.

== Personal life ==
Chipolina was born in Enfield, London, but moved to Gibraltar at age four. He moved back to England aged 12, and attended Southgate School, where he featured heavily for the school football team and their offshoot, the Southgate Saints. During his time in Southgate, he had a trial period of three months at Luton Town. He moved back to Gibraltar at age 18. Chipolina works as a Customs Officer in Gibraltar.

Roy is a cousin of fellow Gibraltar footballers Joseph (born 1987) and Kenneth (born 1994) Chipolina.

== Career statistics ==
=== International ===
Appearances and goals by national team and year
National team	Year	Apps	Goals
Gibraltar	2013	1	0
Gibraltar	2014	8	1
Gibraltar	2015	6	0
Gibraltar	2016	6	0
Gibraltar	2017	6	0
Gibraltar	2018	5	0
Gibraltar	2019	10	1
Gibraltar	2020	4	0
Gibraltar	2021	11	0
Gibraltar	2022	7	3
Gibraltar	2023	10	0
Gibraltar	2024	1	0
Total		75	5

Scores and results list Gibraltar's goal tally first, score column indicates score after each Chipolina goal.

List of international goals scored by Roy Chipolina
No.	Date	Venue	Opponent	Score	Result	Competition
1	1 March 2014	Victoria Stadium, Gibraltar	Faroe Islands	1–0	1–4	Friendly
2	15 October 2019	Victoria Stadium, Gibraltar	Georgia	2–2	2–3	UEFA Euro 2020 qualifying
3	23 September 2022	Huvepharma Arena, Razgrad, Bulgaria	Bulgaria	1–1	1–5	2022–23 UEFA Nations League C
4	16 November 2022	Victoria Stadium, Gibraltar	Liechtenstein	1–0	2–0	Friendly
5	19 November 2022	Victoria Stadium, Gibraltar	Andorra	1–0	1–1	Friendly

== Honours ==
Lincoln Red Imps

- Gibraltar League (16): 2006–07, 2007–08, 2008–09, 2009–10, 2010–11, 2011–12, 2012–13, 2013–14, 2014–15, 2015–16, 2017–18, 2018–19, 2020–21, 2021–22, 2022–23, 2023-24
- Rock Cup (10): 2006–07, 2007–08, 2008–09, 2009–10, 2010–11, 2014, 2015, 2016, 2021, 2021–22
- Pepe Reyes Cup (9): 2007, 2008, 2009, 2010, 2011, 2014, 2015, 2017, 2022
- Gibraltar League Senior Cup (5): 2006–07, 2007–08, 2010–11, 2011–12, 2013–14
