= Joseph Chipolina =

Gibraltarian footballer

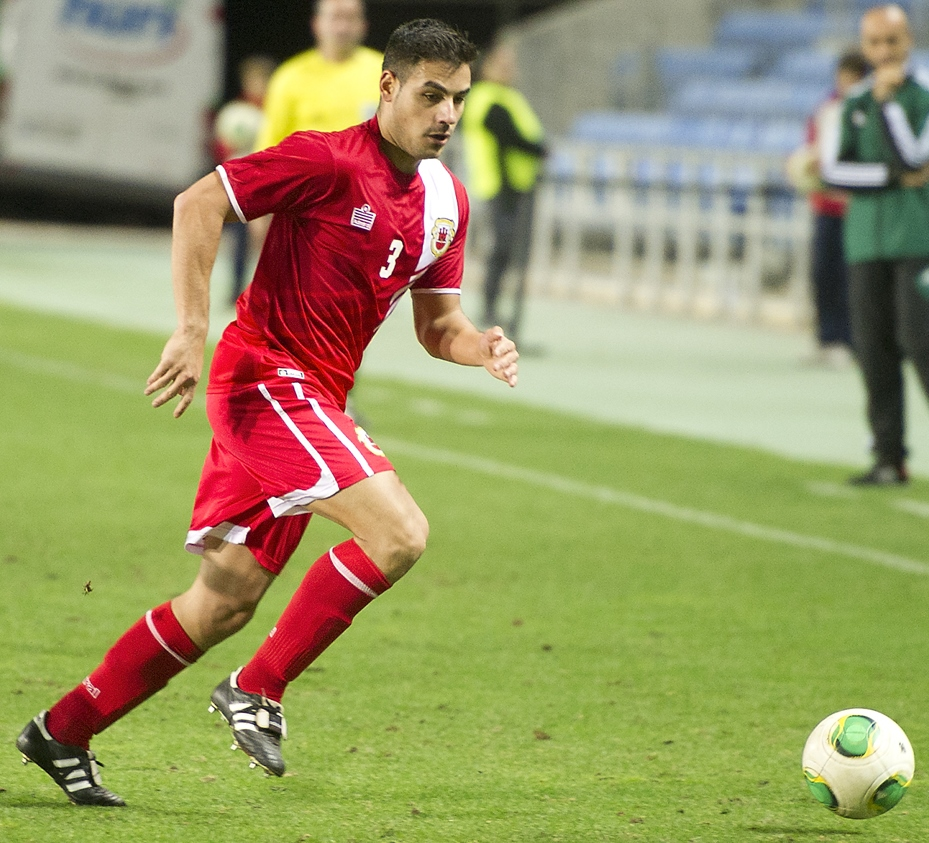
- Chipolina playing against Slovakia in Gibraltar's UEFA debut, 2013

Personal information
- Full name: Joseph Louis Chipolina
- Date of birth: 14 December 1987 (age 38)
- Place of birth: Gibraltar
- Height: 5 ft 10 in (1.78 m)
- Positions: Left back; winger

Senior career*
Years	Team	Apps	(Gls)
2007–2012	Linense	108	(17)
2011–2012	→ San Roque (loan)	24	(2)
2012	Real Colorado Foxes	15	(5)
2013	St Joseph's	–	(–)
2013–2023	Lincoln Red Imps	123	(73)
2022–2023	→ Glacis United (loan)	16	(1)
2023–2024	FCB Magpies	14	(1)
2024–2026	Manchester 62	22	(8)

International career
2009–2013	Gibraltar XI (Non-FIFA)	8	(5)
2006–2024	Gibraltar	70	(7)
- * Club domestic league appearances and goals as of 18 January 2026

Joseph Louis Chipolina (born 14 December 1987) is a Gibraltar international footballer who last played for Manchester 62 of the Gibraltar Football League as a left back or left winger.

He is his nation's third most-capped player of all time, having also played the first 27 official matches after Gibraltar were accepted into UEFA.

== Club career ==
Chipolina began his career with Linense of the Spanish Segunda División B and Tercera División, the third and fourth tier of the Spanish football league system respectively, between 2007 and 2012. In 2011–12, Chipolina played one season at CD San Roque of the Tercera División. In March 2012, Chipolina earned a week-long trial at Leyton Orient of England's League One. Chipolina and San Roque terminated his contract by mutual consent in April 2012. In total, Chipolina made 26 appearances for the club.

On 2 July 2014, Chipolina scored the first goal for a Gibraltarian club in the UEFA Champions League, with a penalty to give Lincoln Red Imps the lead over HB Tórshavn of the Faroe Islands in a 1–1 draw.

In December 2015, Chipolina was offered trials with three Scottish clubs, including Hibernian. However, the trials were cancelled at the last moment because of apparent contract complications with his club Lincoln Red Imps.

Chipolina was the world's second top scoring defender of the 2010s, only behind Real Madrid and Spain centre-back Sergio Ramos.

== International career ==
Between 2007 and 2013, Chipolina appeared in seven matches for Gibraltar and scored five goals before Gibraltar applied for and was granted UEFA membership. One of his caps came in a friendly match against England C which garnered interest in the player from Leyton Orient and Scotland's Livingston. He was also a part of the squad that competed in the 2011 Island Games. Chipolina made history by being the first Gibraltarian player to score in an official UEFA match when he scored for the Gibraltar national futsal team in a UEFA Futsal Championship match against Montenegro in 2013.

After Gibraltar was accepted as a member of UEFA, Chipolina was selected as part of the 23-man squad for Gibraltar's official debut against Slovakia on 19 November 2013. Chipolina made his international debut in the match, a start in the eventual 0–0 draw. He played in every one of Gibraltar's games from 19 November 2013 until 3 September 2017, but was left out of the senior squad announcement on 28 September 2017 to face Estonia and Greece national football team. On 13 October 2018, Chipolina scored the only goal from the penalty spot as Gibraltar recorded their first competitive win in a 1–0 victory over Armenia in the 2018–19 UEFA Nations League. He was on the scoresheet again three days later, heading the winner as Gibraltar came from behind to beat Liechtenstein 2–1.

== Career statistics ==
=== International ===
Gibraltar
Year	Apps	Goals
2006	2	0
2007	0	0
2008	0	0
2009	3	2
2010	0	0
2011	4	3
2012	0	0
2013	1	0
2014	8	0
2015	7	0
2016	7	0
2017	4	0
2018	5	2
2019	10	0
2020	0	0
2021	5	0
2022	5	0
2023	6	0
2024	3	0
Total	70	7

International goals for Gibraltar

Scores and results list Gibraltar's goal tally first.

No.	Date	Venue	Opponent	Score	Result	Competition
1	13 October 2018	Vazgen Sargsyan Republican Stadium, Yerevan, Armenia	Armenia	1–0	1–0	2018–19 UEFA Nations League D
2	16 October 2018	Victoria Stadium, Gibraltar	Liechtenstein	2–1	2–1	2018–19 UEFA Nations League D

International goals for Gibraltar XI

Scores and results list Gibraltar's goal tally first.

No	Date	Venue	Opponent	Score	Result	Competition
1.	6 June 2009	Solvallen, Eckerö, Åland	Frøya	2–0	8–0	2009 Island Games
2.	6 June 2009	Solvallen, Eckerö, Åland	Frøya	3–0	8–0	2009 Island Games
3.	26 June 2011	St Georges Park, Newport, Isle of Wight	Alderney	1–0	6–1	2011 Island Games
4.	28 June 2011	Beatrice Avenue, East Cowes, Isle of Wight	Isle of Wight	2–3	2–3	2011 Island Games
5.	30 June 2011	Peter Henry Ground, Brading, Isle of Wight	Saaremaa	2–0	4–0	2011 Island Games

== Personal life ==
Chipolina works as a Prison Officer in Gibraltar. He is the older brother of Kenneth Chipolina who also plays for the Gibraltar national football team and cousin of Roy Chipolina.

== Honours ==
Lincoln Red Imps

- Gibraltar League: 2012–13, 2013–14, 2014–15, 2015–16, 2017–18, 2018–19, 2020–21, 2021–22, 2022–23
- Rock Cup: 2014, 2015, 2016, 2021, 2021–22
- Gibraltar Premier Cup: 2013–14
- Pepe Reyes Cup: 2014, 2015, 2017, 2022
