= 2016–17 Gibraltar Second Division =

Second Division
- Season: 2016–17
- Champions: Gibraltar Phoenix (1st title)
- Promoted: Gibraltar Phoenix
- Matches played: 72
- Goals scored: 316 (4.39 per match)
- Top goalscorer: Luis Casas Dominguez (24 goals)
- Biggest home win: Gibraltar Phoenix 20–1 Angels (16 November 2016)
- Biggest away win: Leo 0–9 Bruno's Magpies (2 May 2017)
- Highest scoring: Gibraltar Phoenix 20–1 Angels (16 November 2016)
- All statistics correct as of 26 May 2017.

The 2016–17 Gibraltar Second Division season was the fourth since the Gibraltar Football Association joined UEFA. This season the league was contested by 9 clubs.

== Format ==
Clubs play each other twice for a total of 16 matches each. The Second Division winner was promoted while the second-placed team entered a playoff with the ninth-placed team from the Premier Division. This season also saw the introduction of a Home Grown Player (HPG) rule, requiring clubs to name 3 home grown players in their matchday squads with at least one of them on the field of play at all times. Gibraltar Phoenix were forced to forfeit their first two games after being found in breach of this new rule, with their 4-1 win over Hound Dogs on the opening week being overturned.

== Teams ==
Europa Point and Mons Calpe were promoted from the Second Division last season. After the 2015–16 Premier Division season, Angels and Britannia XI were relegated. Britannia XI decided to not register for this season. With Pegasus and Red Imps also not competing, the league consisted of nine clubs this season.

Club	Manager	Captain	Sponsor	Last season
Angels	(Scotland) Lewis Fraser	(Spain) Jorge Serrato	Eroski Center	Premier Division, 10th (relegated)
Boca Gibraltar	(Spain) Juan Jose Pomares Garcia	(Gibraltar) Philip Hermida	Masbro	8th
Bruno's Magpies	(Scotland) David Wilson	(England) Sam Whelan	Bruno's Bar / Chesterton's	4th
Cannons	(Gibraltar) Christian Olivares	(Spain) Adrian Reina Gonzalez		11th
College 1975	(Spain) Juan Francisco Fernandez Molina	(Spain) David Gomez	Cosmopolitan	12th
Gibraltar Phoenix	(Spain) Albert Ferri	(Spain) Borja	General Lifts	3rd
Hound Dogs	(Gibraltar) Chris Gomez	(Gibraltar) Shaun De'Ath	The Calpe Hounds	10th
Leo FC	(Spain) Rogelio Ramagge	(Spain) Fernando Sanchez	BMI Group	7th
Olympique 13	(England) Garry Turner-Bone	(Gibraltar) Anthony Provalosi	VR Solutions	5th

== League table ==
Pos	Team	Pld	W	D	L	GF	GA	GD	Pts	Promotion or Qualification
1	Gibraltar Phoenix (C, P)	16	14	0	2	82	10	+72	42	Promotion to Premier Division
2	Bruno's Magpies	16	12	3	1	63	12	+51	39	Qualification to play-off
3	Boca Gibraltar	16	10	2	4	32	21	+11	32	
4	Cannons	16	7	3	6	33	29	+4	24	
5	Leo	16	6	1	9	28	52	−24	19	
6	Olympique 13	16	5	2	9	28	35	−7	17	
7	College 1975	16	5	1	10	24	40	−16	16	
8	Angels	16	4	1	11	17	66	−49	13	
9	Hound Dogs	16	2	1	13	9	51	−42	7	

Source: Gibraltar FA
Rules for classification: 1) points; 2) goal difference; 3) number of goals scored
(C) Champions; (P) Promoted

== Results ==
Home \ Away	ANG	BOC	BRU	CAN	COL	GPH	HOU	LEO	OLY
Angels		3–0	1–8	0–5	1–1	0–7	3–0	0–4	1–7
Boca Gibraltar	1–0		0–0	1–3	1–0	0–3	2–0	6–3	2–1
Bruno's Magpies	5–0	3–3		4–1	5–3	1–3	8–0	2–0	4–0
Cannons	3–0	0–3	1–1		1–0	0–1	3–0	1–2	1–4
College 1975	2–1	2–5	0–1	1–2		0–3	3–1	1–0	3–1
Gibraltar Phoenix	20–1	2–0	0–3	8–1	11–0		3–0	4–0	5–0
Hound Dogs	0–2	0–3	0–8	1–1	2–5	3–0		1–3	1–0
Leo	0–2	1–3	0–9	2–9	3–2	0–7	4–0		2–2
Olympique 13	3–2	0–2	0–1	1–1	2–1	1–5	3–0	3–4	

Source: GFA
Legend: Blue = home team win; Yellow = draw; Red = away team win.

== Top scorers ==
As of 6 March 2017

Rank	Player	Club	Goals
1	(Spain) Luis Casas Dominguez	Gibraltar Phoenix	24
2	(Spain) German Cortes	Gibraltar Phoenix	15
3	(England) Kofi Halliday	FCB Magpies	9
4	(Spain) Daniel Varona	FCB Magpies	7
4	(Spain) Samuel Mesua	Cannons	7
6	(Spain) Jonathan Tomillero	Gibraltar Phoenix	5
7	(Gibraltar) Justin Santos	Olympique 13	4
7	(Spain) Antonio Jimenez	Gibraltar Phoenix	4
9	(Spain) Juan Antonio Moya	Leo	3
9	(Spain) Francisco Diaz	Cannons	3
9	(Spain) Samuel Corona Nuñez	Boca Gibraltar	3
9	(Spain) Jorge Serrato	Angels	3
9	(Gibraltar) Matthew Grech	Boca Gibraltar	3
9	(Spain) Manuel Ruiz	Leo	3

== See also ==
- 2016–17 Gibraltar Premier Division
