= 2017–18 Gibraltar Premier Division =

Premier Division
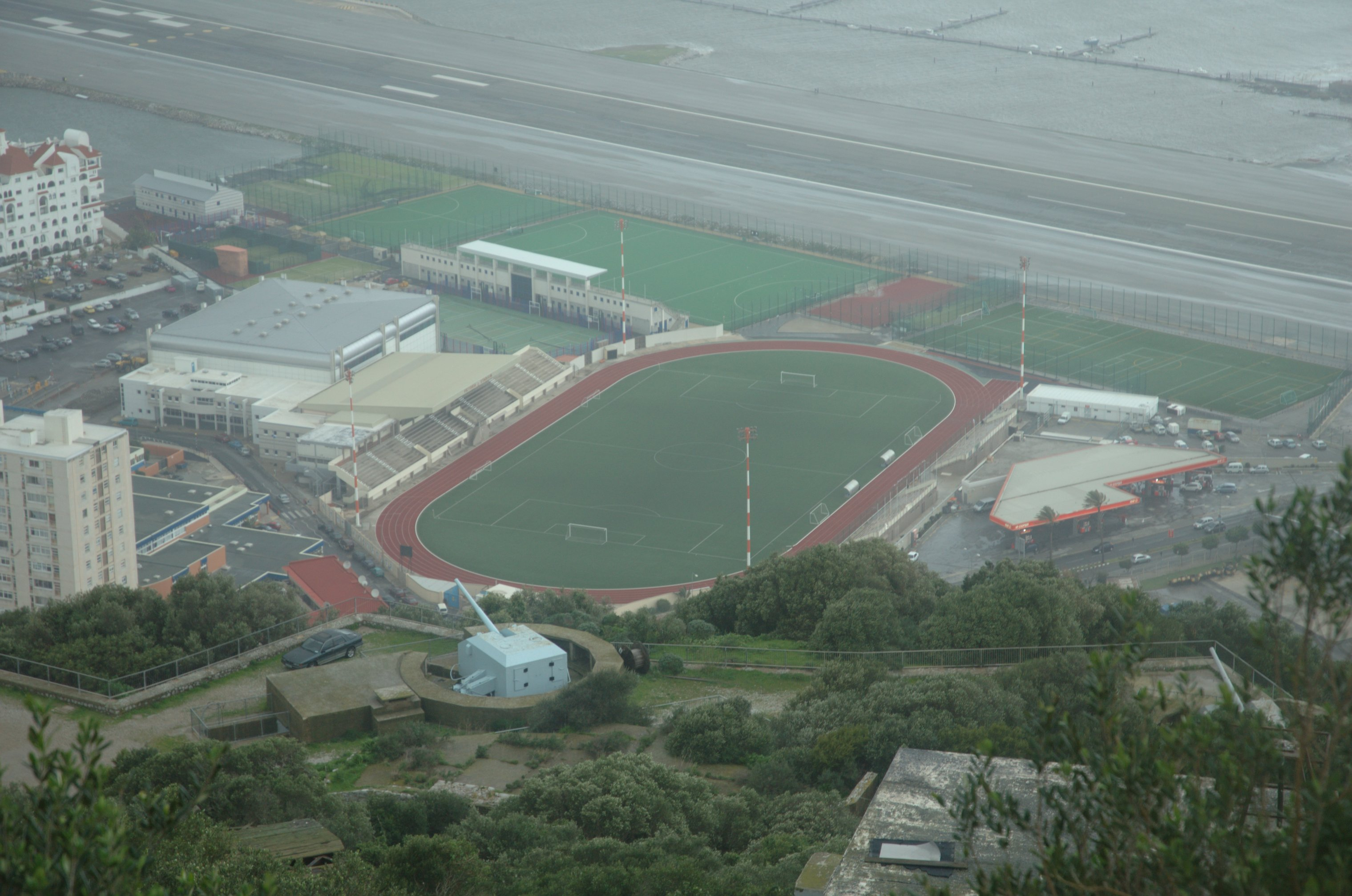
- The Victoria Stadium where each match was played
- Season: 2017–18
- Dates: 25 September 2017 – 3 June 2018
- Champions: Lincoln Red Imps (23rd title)
- Relegated: Manchester 62
- Champions League: Lincoln Red Imps
- Europa League: Europa; St Joseph's
- Matches: 135
- Goals: 421 (3.12 per match)
- Top goalscorer: Enrique Carreño (19 goals)
- Biggest home win: Lynx 9–0 Manchester 62 (3 June 2018)
- Biggest away win: Manchester 62 0–9 Europa FC (30 May 2018)
- Highest scoring: Glacis United 6–4 Manchester 62 (10 March 2018)
- Longest winning run: 11 matches Lincoln Red Imps
- Longest unbeaten run: 16 matches Lincoln Red Imps
- Longest winless run: 27 matches Manchester 62
- Longest losing run: 6 matches Manchester 62; Lynx

The 2017–18 Gibraltar Premier Division was the 119th season of the top-tier national football league in Gibraltar, as well as the fifth season since the Gibraltar Football Association joined UEFA in 2013. The league was contested by ten clubs. It began on 26 September 2017 and ended on 3 June 2018.

Europa were the defending champions, having ended a fourteen-year winning streak for Lincoln Red Imps. This season also saw three clubs from Gibraltar competing in European competition for the first time. Lincoln won their 23rd title on 19 May 2018 with two games to spare, after a 7–1 victory over Lions Gibraltar.

== Format ==
The ten Premier Division clubs played each other three times for a total of 27 matches each. The tenth-placed team in the league would be relegated and the ninth-placed team in the league would enter a playoff with the second-placed team from the Second Division for a place in the 2018–19 Premier Division.

The champions earned a place in the preliminary round of the 2018–19 Champions League, and the second–placed club earned a place in the preliminary round of the 2018–19 Europa League. This season, the league entered a winter break from December to February while renovations took place on Victoria Stadium.

== Teams ==
Location of the stadium where all teams play

At the conclusion of the previous season, Europa Point was relegated. As the champions of the Second Division, Gibraltar Phoenix earned promotion to the league this season. Manchester 62 earned the right to stay in the Premier Division by winning a playoff at the end of the previous season.

Club	Finishing position 2016–17
Europa FC	1st (champions)
Gibraltar Phoenix	1st in Second division (Promoted)
Gibraltar United	7th
Glacis United	4th
Lincoln Red Imps	2nd
Lions Gibraltar	8th
Lynx	6th
Manchester 62	9th
Mons Calpe	5th
St Joseph's	3rd

=== Personnel and kits ===
Note: Flags indicate national team as has been defined under FIFA eligibility rules. Players may hold more than one non-FIFA nationality.

Team	Manager	Captain	Kit manufacturer	Club sponsor
Europa	(Spain) Juan José Gallardo (interim)	(Spain) Javi Muñoz	Jako	Alwani Group
Gibraltar Phoenix	(Spain) Albert Ferri	(Spain) Francisco Javier Moreno	Luanvi	Gourmet Grill
Gibraltar United	(Spain) Manolo Nuñez Sánchez	(Gibraltar) Kyle Goldwin	Kappa	Turicum Bank
Glacis United	(Spain) Mariano Marcos Garcia	(Spain) Daniel Guererro	Nike	Atlantic Financial Group
Lincoln Red Imps	(Spain) Yiyi Perez (interim)	(Gibraltar) Roy Chipolina	Joma	Mansion.com
Lions Gibraltar	(Gibraltar) Rafael Bado	(Gibraltar) Kalian Perez	Erreà	Enterprise Insurance
Lynx	(Gibraltar) Albert Parody	(Egypt) Mohamed Badr	Nike	Verralls
Manchester 62	(Gibraltar) Jonathan Sodi	(Spain) Aarón Durán	Joma	CEPSA GIB
Mons Calpe	(Argentina) Luis Manuel Blanco	(Spain) Rubo Blanco	Givova	Tokamóvil
St. Joseph's	(Spain) Raúl Procopio Baizán	(Spain) Iván Lobato	Kromex	Propability Ltd

=== Managerial Changes ===
Team	Outgoing manager	Manner of departure	Date of vacancy	Position in table	Incoming manager	Date of appointment
Lynx	(Gibraltar) Albert Parody	Resigned	2 June 2017	Pre-season	(Gibraltar) Allen Bula	2 June 2017
Glacis United	(Spain) Manuel Perez	Resigned	15 June 2017	Pre-season	(Spain) Mariano Marcos Garcia	9 July 2017
Europa	(Spain) Juanjo Gallardo	Promoted to Sporting Director	24 July 2017	Pre-season	(Spain) Johnny	24 July 2017
Gibraltar Phoenix	(Spain) Albert Ferri	Resigned	9 July 2017	Pre-season	(Spain) Jaime Molina	9 July 2017
Mons Calpe	(Italy) Mauro Ardizzone	Mutual consent	14 August 2017	Pre-season	(Spain) Albert Ferri	14 August 2017
Lynx	(Gibraltar) Allen Bula	Sacked	27 October 2017	10th	(Gibraltar) Albert Parody (interim)	27 October 2017
Mons Calpe	(Spain) Albert Ferri	Sacked	4 December 2017	8th	(Argentina) Luis Manuel Blanco	9 January 2018
Gibraltar Phoenix	(Spain) Jaime Molina	Sacked	13 December 2017	7th	(Spain) Sergio Mena	1 January 2018
Manchester 62	(Spain) Kiko Prieto	Sacked	1 January 2018	10th	(Gibraltar) Jonathan Sodi	1 January 2018
Lynx	(Gibraltar) Albert Parody	End of interim spell	24 January 2018	9th	(Spain) Daniel Peluas	24 January 2018
Lynx	(Spain) Daniel Peluas	Mutual consent	18 February 2018	9th	(Gibraltar) Albert Parody	19 February 2018
Gibraltar Phoenix	(Spain) Sergio Mena	Sacked	18 March 2018	8th	(Spain) Albert Ferri	19 March 2018
Lincoln Red Imps	(Uruguay) Julio César Ribas	Mutual consent	9 April 2018	1st	(Spain) José Carlos Tello	16 April 2018
Lincoln Red Imps	(Spain) José Carlos Tello	Sacked	20 April 2018	1st	(Spain) Yiyi Perez (interim)	21 April 2018
Europa	(Spain) Johnny	Sacked	21 May 2018	2nd	(Spain) Juanjo Gallardo (interim)	21 May 2018

== League table ==
Pos	Team	Pld	W	D	L	GF	GA	GD	Pts	Qualification or relegation
1	Lincoln Red Imps (C)	27	21	2	4	71	19	+52	65	Qualification for the Champions League preliminary round
2	Europa FC	27	19	3	5	67	20	+47	60	Qualification for the Europa League preliminary round
3	St Joseph's	27	17	3	7	53	30	+23	54	Qualification for the Europa League preliminary round
4	Gibraltar United	27	16	5	6	45	27	+18	53	
5	Mons Calpe	27	14	2	11	48	35	+13	44	
6	Gibraltar Phoenix	27	8	6	13	34	47	−13	30	
7	Glacis United	27	7	5	15	34	44	−10	26	
8	Lions Gibraltar	27	6	5	16	27	63	−36	23	
9	Lynx (O)	27	6	4	17	22	48	−26	22	Qualification for the play-off
10	Manchester 62 (R)	27	0	7	20	20	88	−68	7	Relegation to the Gibraltar Second Division

Source: UEFA, Soccerway
Rules for classification: 1) Points; 2) Goal difference; 3) Goals scored.
(C) Champions; (O) Play-off winners; (R) Relegated

== Results ==
=== Matches 1–18 ===
Home \ Away	EFC	GPH	GIB	GLA	LIN	LGI	LYN	MAN	MCA	SJO
Europa FC	—	3–1	4–0	2–1	1–1	0–1	2–0	4–1	3–0	2–0
Gibraltar Phoenix	3–3	—	0–1	1–0	0–5	1–0	0–1	1–1	1–1	0–1
Gibraltar United	2–0	2–2	—	4–1	0–1	3–1	2–0	2–1	3–1	3–1
Glacis United	1–2	1–1	2–0	—	0–3	6–2	0–0	6–4	1–0	0–3
Lincoln Red Imps	3–1	1–0	4–0	4–0	—	3–1	2–0	3–0	1–3	2–0
Lions Gibraltar	2–1	1–6	0–0	0–1	1–4	—	0–0	2–2	2–1	0–2
Lynx	0–3	2–1	0–0	3–1	0–4	0–3	—	0–0	0–5	1–3
Manchester 62	0–2	1–1	1–1	1–1	1–3	2–4	1–2	—	0–3	1–2
Mons Calpe	0–1	1–2	1–3	2–1	0–1	3–1	3–0	4–2	—	3–1
St Joseph's	0–1	3–1	0–1	1–0	4–2	4–2	2–1	3–1	0–0	—

Source: Gibraltar Football Association, UEFA
Legend: Blue = home team win; Yellow = draw; Red = away team win.

=== Matches 19–27 ===
Home \ Away	EFC	GPH	GIB	GLA	LIN	LGI	LYN	MAN	MCA	SJO
Europa FC	—	—	2–1	2–0	—	—	1–2	—	1–0	—
Gibraltar Phoenix	0–8	—	—	—	0–2	5–2	—	2–0	—	—
Gibraltar United	—	2–1	—	—	3–1	2–0	1–0	—	—	1–1
Glacis United	—	1–2	0–3	—	—	—	3–0	—	0–2	—
Lincoln Red Imps	0–0	—	—	1–0	—	7–1	—	6–0	—	0–3
Lions Gibraltar	0–5	—	—	0–0	—	—	—	0–0	0–2	0–3
Lynx	—	0–2	—	—	0–1	0–1	—	9–0	—	—
Manchester 62	0–9	—	0–4	0–6	—	—	—	—	0–3	0–5
Mons Calpe	—	1–0	2–1	—	0–6	—	5–0	—	—	2–4
St Joseph's	1–4	3–0	—	1–1	—	—	2–1	—	—	—

Source: Gibraltar Football Association, UEFA
Legend: Blue = home team win; Yellow = draw; Red = away team win.

== Promotion/relegation play-off ==
The ninth-placed team from the Premier Division played a play-off match with the second-placed Second Division club for a place in the 2018–19 Premier Division.

8 June 2018
20:00

Lynx	2–0	Olympique 13
Fernández 56', 84'

Victoria Stadium, Gibraltar

== Season statistics ==
=== Scoring ===
As of 3 June 2018

==== Top scorers ====
Rank	Player	Club	Goals
1	(Spain) Enrique Carreño	Europa	19
2	(Spain) Germán Cortés	Gibraltar Phoenix	15
2	(Philippines) Kike Gómez	Europa	15
2	(Spain) Rubo Blanco	Mons Calpe	15
2	(Argentina) Pibe	Mons Calpe	15
6	(Spain) Falu Aranda	Lincoln Red Imps	12
7	(Egypt) Ayman Elghobashy	Gibraltar United	11
8	(Spain) Boro	St Joseph's	9
8	(Spain) Antonio Cerezo	Glacis United	9
10	(Spain) Dani Ponce	Gibraltar United	7
10	(Gibraltar) Anthony Hernandez	Lincoln Red Imps	7
10	(Spain) Domingo Ferrer	St Joseph's	7

==== Hat-tricks ====
Player	For	Against	Result	Date
(Gibraltar) Jean-Carlos Garcia	Lincoln Red Imps	Glacis United	4–0 (H)	27 September 2017
(Spain) Falu Aranda	Lincoln Red Imps	Gibraltar Phoenix	5–0 (A)	15 October 2017
(Spain) Antonio Cerezo	Glacis United	Lions Gibraltar	6–2 (H)	31 March 2018
(Spain) German Cortes	Gibraltar Phoenix	Lions Gibraltar	6–1 (A)	5 April 2018
(Spain) Enrique Carreño^{4}	Europa	Lions Gibraltar	5–0 (A)	15 April 2018
(Spain) Falu Aranda	Lincoln Red Imps	Manchester 62	6–0 (H)	7 May 2018
(Spain) Antonio Cerezo^{4}	Glacis United	Manchester 62	6–0 (A)	13 May 2018
(Spain) Enrique Carreño^{6}	Europa	Manchester 62	9–0 (A)	30 May 2018
(Spain) German Cortes	Gibraltar Phoenix	Lions Gibraltar	5–1 (H)	31 May 2018
(Argentina) Franco Gargiulo	Lynx	Manchester 62	9–0 (H)	3 June 2018
(Gibraltar) Kevagn Robba	Lynx	Manchester 62	9–0 (H)	3 June 2018

=== Clean sheets ===
Rank	Player	Club	Clean sheets
1	(Spain) Manuel Soler	Lincoln Red Imps	16
2	(Spain) Javi Muñoz	Europa	12
3	(Gibraltar) Kyle Goldwin	Gibraltar United	9
4	(Spain) Borja Gonzalez	Glacis United	7
5	(Argentina) Mateo Grasso	Mons Calpe	6
5	(Gibraltar) Jamie Robba	St Joseph's	6
7	(Spain) Edu Oliva	Lions Gibraltar	4
8	(Spain) Goito	Gibraltar Phoenix	3
8	(Spain) José Miguel Gonzalez	Lions Gibraltar	3
8	(Argentina) Joaquin Ketlun	Lynx	3
8	(Spain) Félix Romero	St Joseph's	3

== See also ==
- 2017–18 Gibraltar Second Division
