= College 1975 F.C. =

Association football club in Gibraltar

College 1975
- Full name: College 1975 Football Club
- Nickname: The Dolphins
- Founded: 1975
- Ground: Victoria Stadium, Gibraltar
- Capacity: 2,300
- President: Joseph Mir
- Manager: Óscar León
- League: Gibraltar Football League
- 2025–26: 9th
- Website: https://college1975fc.co.uk/default.aspx
Home colours	Away colours

College 1975 FC is an association football team from Gibraltar. Originally formed in 1975, they currently play in the Gibraltar Football League.

== History ==
Formed in 1975, College spent the majority of their existence moving between the top two divisions in Gibraltar, with second and third teams playing elsewhere in the pyramid. During this time, they went through several variations of their name, most notably College Cosmos, before entering into a partnership with the reforming Europa in 2013, bring in extra resources as the Gibraltar Football Association joined UEFA. This saw an immediate upturn in results, and saw College Europa qualify for the UEFA Europa League at the first attempt via the 2014 Rock Cup. However, in 2015 the partnership between the two sides ended, and while the newly independent Europa retained their place in the Gibraltar Premier Division, the Dolphins, now calling themselves College 1975, were forced to start new in the Gibraltar Second Division.

Since the split, the side largely constructed by player-manager Nolan Bosio competed in the Second Division, reaching the final of the Second Division Cup in 2017, until the two divisions in Gibraltar merged in 2019. With a new management brought in under chairman Joseph Mir, a large scale rebuild of the squad took place, including the establishment of an under-23 side for the Gibraltar Intermediate League. Despite this, the side struggled on their return to the top flight, picking up a solitary point in a 5–5 draw with Europa Point, in their final match before the season was abandoned.

In 2023, College 1975 entered a partnership with futsal side Hercules FC to enter the Gibraltar Women's Futsal League, where Hercules would act as the Dolphins' affiliate club.

== Current squad ==
=== First team ===
As of 6 September 2026. Note: Flags indicate national team as defined under FIFA eligibility rules; some limited exceptions apply. Players may hold more than one non-FIFA nationality.

No.	Pos.	Nation	Player
1	GK	ESP	Lolo Soler
2	DF	GIB	Ryan Azopardi
3	DF	GIB	Jamie-Luke McCarthy
4	MF	ESP	Javi Moreno
5	DF	GIB	Thomas Hastings
6	DF	ESP	Javi Anaya (captain)
7	MF	GIB	Kiri McGrail
8	MF	GIB	Hatim Smith
9	FW	ESP	Luis Casas
10	FW	ESP	Pollo
11	FW	GIB	Dylan Peacock
12	DF	GIB	Leeroy Costa
13	GK	ESP	Manu Caro
14	MF	GIB	Kaylan Franco
15	DF	ESP	Abel Gavira
16	DF	GIB	Julian Laguea

No.	Pos.	Nation	Player
17	FW	GIB	Robert Montovio, Jr.
18	MF	GIB	Anthony Hernandez
19	FW	GIB	James Caetano
20	FW	GIB	Finlay Cawthorn
21	MF	ESP	Iván Ruiz
22	MF	GIB	Tristam Moya
24	MF	GIB	Francis Huart
25	MF	GIB	Elijah Bolanos
26	MF	GIB	Nazim Hughes (vice-captain)
27	FW	GIB	Kyle Rodriguez
31	DF	MAR	Karim Piñero
32	MF	GIB	Christian Chipolina
33	MF	GIB	Jyron Zammitt
37	DF	GIB	Jean-Carlos Garcia
40	GK	GIB	Jake Victor

== Club staff ==
Position	Name
Club Management
Head Coach	(Spain) Óscar León
Assistant Coach	(Spain) Antonio Cortés
Goalkeeper Coach	(Spain) Benjamín Parody
Physical Trainer	(Spain) Jesús Fernández
Physio	(Spain) Nacho Vidal
Team Delegate	(Spain) David Moreno
Board
President	(Gibraltar) Joseph Mir
Vice-president	(Gibraltar) Ezzard Mir
Director of Football	(Gibraltar) Adrian Ballestero
Team Delegate	(Gibraltar) Tito Podesta

== Seasons ==
Seasons since joining UEFA only. (Note: Seasons up to 2015 as part of College Europa FC.)

Season	Division	League record								Rock Cup
Season	Division	P	W	D	L	GF	GA	Pts	Pos	Rock Cup
2013–14	Premier	14	5	4	5	31	20	6	4th of 8	Final
2014–15	Premier	21	12	6	3	42	14	42	2nd of 8	Quarter-finals
2015–16	Second	22	2	0	20	20	114	6	12th of 12	Quarter-finals
2016–17	Second	16	5	1	10	24	40	16	7th of 9	Second round
2017–18	Second	14	2	0	12	14	48	6	7th of 9	First round
2018–19	Second	18	3	2	13	13	62	11	5th of 7	Second round
2019–20	National	18	0	1	17	18	99	1	12th of 12 (Note: Season abandoned due to the COVID-19 pandemic)	First round
2020–21	National	18	2	2	14	23	81	8	10th of 11	Quarter-finals
2021–22	National	18	6	2	10	17	28	20	8th of 11	Semi-finals
2022–23	GFL	18	2	3	13	19	51	9	10th of 11	First round
2023–24	GFL	20	3	2	15	21	65	11	11th of 11	First round
2024–25	GFL	20	5	3	12	18	39	18	8th of 11	First round

== Club records ==
Records since joining UEFA only.

- Gibraltar Premier Cup: 2014–15 (as College Europa)
- Best league finish - 2nd, Gibraltar Premier Division: 2014–15 (as College Europa)
- Best Rock Cup performance - Runners-Up: 2014
- Best Second Division Cup performance - Runners up: 2017
