= Robert Guiling =

Gibraltarian footballer

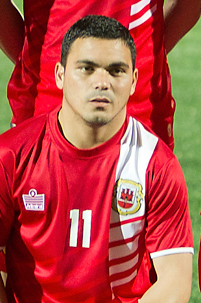
- Robert Guiling at the Victoria Stadium in March 2014

Personal information
- Full name: Robert Louis Guiling
- Date of birth: 14 October 1980 (age 46)
- Place of birth: Gibraltar
- Position: Midfielder

Team information
- Current team: Manchester 62
- Number: 22

Senior career*
Years	Team	Apps	(Gls)
2003–2013	Lincoln Red Imps (Note: Pre-UEFA. Gibraltar football stats before 2013 are unknown)		
2013–2014	Lincoln Red Imps	7	(1)
2014–2018	Lynx	65	(3)
2021–	Manchester 62	4	(3)

International career^{‡}
2013–2017	Gibraltar	13	(0)
- * Club domestic league appearances and goals as of 19:14, 16 April 2021 (UTC+1) ‡ National team caps and goals as of 11 October 2017

Robert Louis Guiling (born 14 October 1980) is a Gibraltarian footballer who plays for Manchester 62, where he plays as a midfielder. Between 2013 and 2017, he represented the Gibraltar national team.

== International career ==
Guiling made his international debut with Gibraltar on 19 November 2013 in a 0–0 home draw with Slovakia. This was Gibraltar's first game since being admitted to the UEFA
