= Jordan Perez =

Gibraltarian footballer (born 1986)

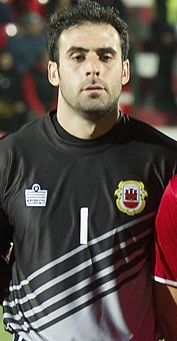
- Perez with Gibraltar in 2014

Personal information
- Full name: Jordan López Pérez
- Date of birth: 13 November 1986 (age 40)
- Place of birth: Gibraltar
- Height: 1.85 m (6 ft 1 in)
- Position: Goalkeeper

Team information
- Current team: Lions Gibraltar
- Number: 25

Senior career*
Years	Team	Apps	(Gls)
2005–2007	College Europa		
2007–2008	Lynx		
2008–2013	Manchester 62		
2013–2014	Lincoln Red Imps	13	(0)
2014–2015	Lions Gibraltar	15	(0)
2015–2017	St Joseph's	32	(0)
2017–2018	FC Olympique 13	16	(0)
2019	Gibraltar United	0	(0)
2019	Boca Gibraltar	7	(0)
2020–2021	Mons Calpe	1	(0)
2021	Bruno's Magpies	5	(0)
2021–2022	Glacis United	8	(0)
2022–2023	Mons Calpe	9	(0)
2023	Lynx	7	(0)
2023–2024	Europa	4	(0)
2024–	Lions Gibraltar	7	(0)

International career^{‡}
2013–2016	Gibraltar	17	(0)
- * Club domestic league appearances and goals as of 4 April 2026 ‡ National team caps and goals as of 5 January 2017

Jordan López Pérez (born 13 November 1986) is a Gibraltarian volleyball player and footballer who plays for Lions Gibraltar in the Gibraltar Football League, and represented the Gibraltar national team in UEFA competition from 2013 until 2017, as a goalkeeper.

== Club career ==
Perez started his career with College Europa and joined Manchester 62 in 2008, after a short stint at Lynx. In 2013, he moved to fellow league team Lincoln Red Imps, being champion of the League, the Cup and the League Cup.

In October 2014 Perez rescinded with Lincoln, due to the lack of first team action, and joined Lions Gibraltar shortly after.

In April 2015, Perez joined League Two side Wycombe Wanderers on a weeks training, despite interest from Ipswich Town.

He signed for St Joseph's in summer 2015 after a season at Lions. Shortly after the arrival of former Lincoln boss Raul Procopio at St Joseph's, Perez left the club, citing a growing loss of interest in football and the need to take a break from the sport. He will re-assess his options in the summer.

In the summer of 2017 Jordan committed his future to the ambitious project at F.C. Olympique 13 teaming up with Scottish manager Lewis Fraser, however, he left the club at the end of the season. In August 2019, he returned to football when he signed for Gibraltar United, providing competition for young keeper Christian Lopez after the departure of Kyle Goldwin. Nine days later, Gibraltar United were expelled from the league for failing to repay debts, so Perez instead joined Boca Gibraltar, making his debut the next day against Manchester 62. After leaving Boca and serving as a goalkeeping coach for the Gibraltar national under-21 football team, he returned to football again in July 2020 when he signed for Mons Calpe. In February 2021 he moved to Bruno's Magpies.

== International career ==
Perez made his international debut with Gibraltar on 19 November 2013 in a 0–0 home draw with Slovakia. This was Gibraltar's first game since being admitted to UEFA. On 13 June 2015, Perez made arguably the save of his career by saving a penalty from German captain Bastian Schweinsteiger in a match against Germany in a European Qualifier to prevent Gibraltar from going 1–0 down. Despite Germany going on to win the game 7–0, Perez was impressed with his team's performance and described his penalty save as 'surreal'.

== Personal life ==
Perez is a fireman for the City Fire Brigade Gibraltar. He has also represented Gibraltar in indoor volleyball at the 2007 Island Games and beach volleyball at the 2019 Island Games.

== Honours ==
Lincoln Red Imps

- Gibraltar Premier Division: 2013–14
- Rock Cup: 2014
- Gibraltar Premier Cup: 2013–2014
