= Angels F.C. =

Former association football club in Gibraltar

Angels
- Full name: Angels Football Club
- Founded: 2014
- Dissolved: 2018
- Ground: Victoria Stadium, Gibraltar
- Capacity: 2000
- Owner: Edmund Hosken
- Chairman: Joshua Lhote
- Manager: Juan José Jiménez
- 2017–18: Expelled
Home colours	Away colours

Angels F.C. was a football team from Gibraltar. They played in the Gibraltar Second Division and the Rock Cup until February 2018, when their license was revoked.

== History ==
Angels Football Club formed in 2014, after the rising interest in association football on the British overseas territory of Gibraltar. In July 2014 it was announced that the club would compete in the Gibraltar Second Division for its maiden season. After a slow start to the season the club climbed the table and after a tight title race with other new entries Gibraltar United and Europa Point, the side won promotion with a win over Mons Calpe on the final day of the season, overturning a 2–1 score at half-time. The club, despite finishing second, was awarded promotion due to the GFA's decision to expand the Gibraltar Premier Division to 10 teams. The side sacked Juanfran Fernandez Perez in July 2015, with Albert Ferry coming in as his replacement.

On 7 November 2016, Lewis Fraser took over from Joel Richard Williams, who left to coach in India. Lewis comes with experience from youth academies in the UK. As a result of the loss of a number of players, the side suffered a record 20–1 defeat to Gibraltar Phoenix on 16 November 2016, having only been able to field 9 players (one of which played with an injury). They eventually finished 8th in the table, ahead of only Hound Dogs, although they drew praise for their attitude on and off the pitch. On June 22, 2017, Fraser resigned as manager of Angels.

The club started strongly in the 2017–18 season, being in the title race by the winter break. However, on 2 February 2018, the Gibraltar Football Association found gross violations of player quota and home grown player rules at the club, and revoked their license for the season. Their record was expunged and the club was expelled from the league. They were not re-admitted to the league the following season.

== Seasons ==
Season	Division	League record								Rock Cup
Season	Division	P	W	D	L	GF	GA	Pts	Pos	Rock Cup
2014–15	Second	26	21	2	3	76	20	65	2nd ↑	R2
2015–16	Premier	27	3	0	24	20	107	9	10th ↓	QF
2016–17	Second	16	4	1	11	17	66	13	8th	R1
2017–18	Second	0	0	0	0	0	0	0	9th	R1

== Final squad ==
Note: Flags indicate national team as defined under FIFA eligibility rules; some limited exceptions apply. Players may hold more than one non-FIFA nationality.

No.	Pos.	Nation	Player
1	GK	ESP	Francisco José Jimenez
2	DF	ESP	Fernando Moya
3	DF	ESP	José Antonio Ferrer
4	DF	ESP	Rafael Moreno
5	DF	GIB	Edmund Hosken
6	DF	ESP	Adrian Pino
7	MF	ESP	Jose Antonio Gonzalez
8	MF	ESP	Samuel Valero
9	MF	ESP	Daniel Moreno
11	MF	ESP	Toufik Larouia

No.	Pos.	Nation	Player
12	DF	GIB	Scott Kelly
13	DF	ESP	Pedro Ardanaz
14	MF	ISR	Tomer Hemed
15	MF	FRA	Hatem Ben Arfa
16	FW	ESP	José Antonio Ligero
17	FW	ESP	Alfonso Moreno
18	DF	GIB	Tyrone Sampere
19	MF	SEN	Ndiaga Kane
20	MF	GIB	Kyle Gomez
21	DF	ESP	José María Martos
