= F.C. Olympique 13 =

Association football club in Gibraltar

FC Olympique 13
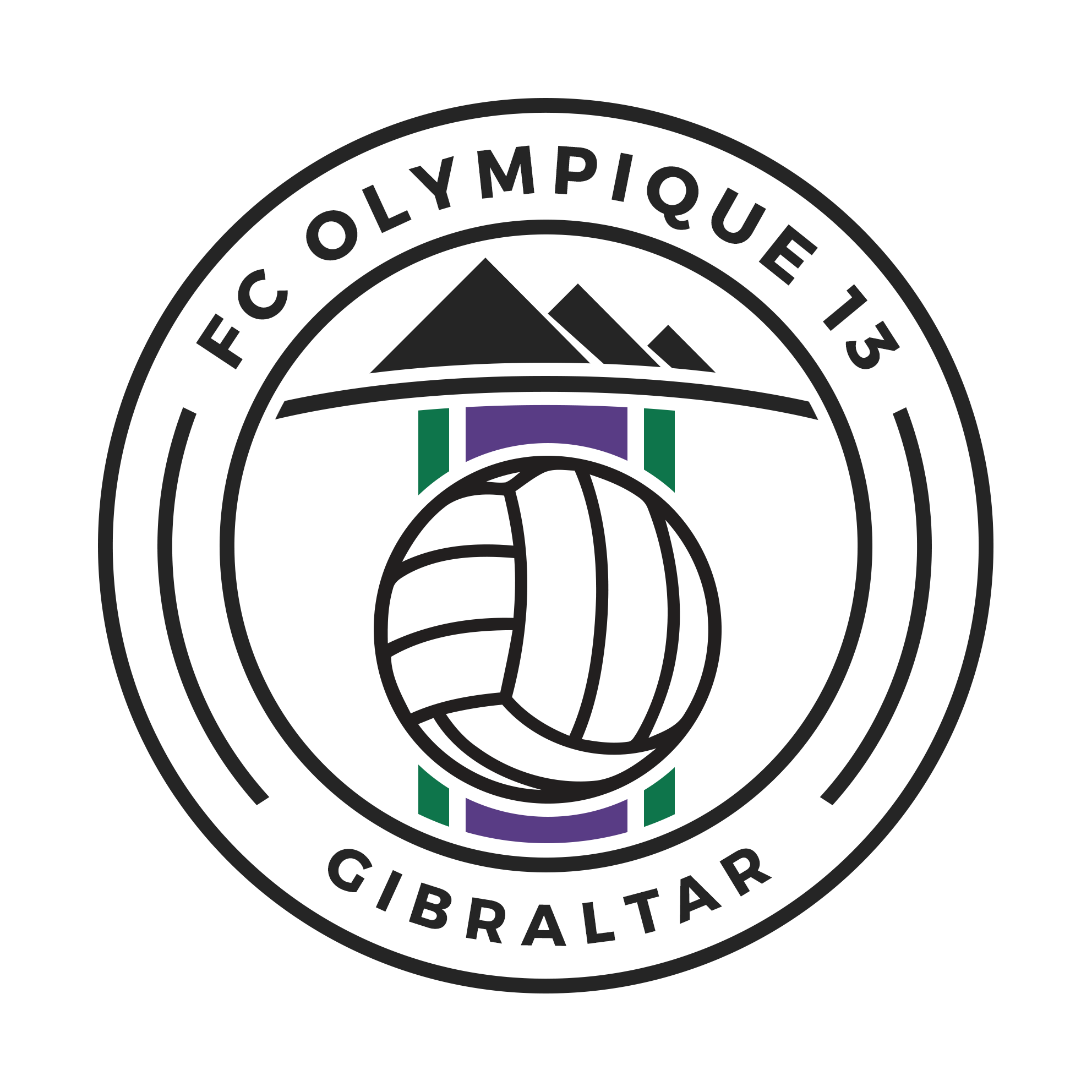
- Full name: Football Club Olympique Gibraltar 13
- Short name: FCO13
- Founded: 2013
- Ground: Victoria Stadium, Gibraltar
- Capacity: 2,300
- Chairman: Sunday Adeleye
- Manager: Ángel Parla-Díaz
- League: ~~Gibraltar National League~~
- 2018–19: Gibraltar Second Division, 3rd
- Website: http://www.fcolympique13.com
Home colours	Away colours

F.C. Olympique 13 was a football team from Gibraltar. They play in the Gibraltar National League, having played in the Gibraltar Second Division since their formation in 2013 until the two divisions merged in 2019, and compete in the Rock Cup, the country's top tier cup competition.

As with all other clubs in the territory, FC Olympique 13 currently share the Victoria Stadium on Winston Churchill Avenue.

== History ==
The club formed in 2013 amid the heightened interest in football on Gibraltar, after the territory was admitted to UEFA that year. In their debut season in the Gibraltar Second Division, they finished 3rd and narrowly missed out on promotion. However, the club failed to improve on their debut season as a 7th-place finish followed in 2014–15, a 5th-place finish in 2015–16 and a 6th-place finish in their final season under English manager Gary Turner-Bone.

The summer of 2017 saw significant changes at the club as it was taken over by Nigerian businessman Sunday Adeleye, who also owns DSS F.C. of the Nigeria National League. Aside from establishing a link between the two clubs with young players transferring between DSS and Olympique, the newly re-branded club hired Scottish manager Lewis Fraser and completely overhauled the squad, bringing in several players from his old club Angels F.C. along with assistant manager Steven Gallagher. The club's ambitions were made clear with the signing of 2 former international players throughout the 2017–18 season, including goalkeeper Jordan Perez and striker Robert Montovio in the summer.

The club endured a slow start to the season, struggling in mid-table by the winter break. This resulted in a large scale rebuild of the squad in January, exemplified by the loan addition of Lincoln Red Imps attacker Kyle Casciaro along with Godwin Egbo, Dizza Usman and Uche Nwankwo from parent club DSS. The expulsion of promotion rivals Angels on 2 February 2018 saw the club propelled from 4th to 2nd in the league, one point off unbeaten leaders Europa Point, without kicking a ball over the winter break. Accompanied by a club record 16–0 victory over mid-season league leaders Cannons on the penultimate matchday, Olympique guaranteed their spot in the promotion play-off on 20 May, after a late Max Bothen goal secured a 1–0 victory over Hound Dogs. However, they lost the play-off to Lynx on 8 June. At the end of the season, Fraser left the club, and the club appointed former Leo manager Norberto Alonso Simón on 13 July 2018.

== Current squad ==
As of 16 February 2019

Note: Flags indicate national team as defined under FIFA eligibility rules; some limited exceptions apply. Players may hold more than one non-FIFA nationality.

No.	Pos.	Nation	Player
1	GK	GIB	Kenneth Cruz
2	DF	GIB	Steffan Cardona
3	FW	ESP	Pedro Perez Ruiz
4	DF	ESP	Jonathan Guerrero
5	DF	GIB	Julian Lavagna
6	MF	GIB	Nick Castle
8	MF	GIB	Jonatan García Navas
9	FW	ESP	Alejandro Carenote
10	FW	GIB	Angelo Lavagna
11	FW	GIB	Leeroy Ruiz
12	MF	GIB	Adrian Lopez

No.	Pos.	Nation	Player
13	GK	ESP	Carlos Carenote (2nd captain)
14	DF	ESP	Edu
15	MF	GIB	Karl Sene
17	DF	NGA	Godwin Egbo
18	MF	NGA	Nwankwo Uchechukwu
20	FW	NGA	Dizza Usman
21	FW	ESP	Riki Rojo
22	MF	GIB	Andrew Lopez (captain)
23	DF	ESP	Kiki
27	DF	ESP	Dani Corderó
99	GK	ESP	David Moreno Garcia

== Achievements ==
- Best League finish: 2nd, Gibraltar Second Division (2017–18)
- Best Rock Cup performance: Quarter-Finals (2017–18, 2019)
- Record victory: 16–0 vs Cannons, 8 May 2018
