= Robert Montovio =

Gibraltarian footballer

Personal information
- Full name: Robert Montovio
- Date of birth: 3 August 1984 (age 42)
- Place of birth: Gibraltar
- Position: Striker

Senior career*
Years	Team	Apps	(Gls)
1999–2010	Manchester United (Gibraltar)		
2010–2013	Glacis United		
2013–2014	College Europa	17	(8)
2014–2015	Europa Point	23	(18)
2015–2017	Gibraltar United	45	(21)
2017–2018	FC Olympique 13	14	(14)
2018	Europa Point	3	(4)
2019	Manchester 62	7	(12)
2019	Leo	0	(0)
2019–2021	Manchester 62	27	(6)
2021–2023	Mons Calpe	18	(6)

International career^{‡}
2016	Gibraltar	2	(0)
- * Club domestic league appearances and goals as of 19:30, 22 April 2023 (UTC) ‡ National team caps and goals as of 25 March 2016

Robert Montovio (born 3 August 1984) is a retired Gibraltarian footballer who last played as a forward for Mons Calpe.

== International career ==
He made his debut for the Gibraltar national football team on 23 March 2016, as an 81st-minute substitute for Lee Casciaro in a goalless draw against Liechtenstein at the Victoria Stadium.

== Coaching and futsal ==
Upon joining Gibraltar United in 2015, Montovio became a youth coach at the club, a role he continued until the club folded despite leaving the team as a player in 2017.
