= Europa Pegasus F.C. =

Former association football club in Gibraltar

Europa Pegasus
- Ground: Victoria Stadium, Gibraltar
- Capacity: 5,000
- League: Gibraltar Second Division

Europa Pegasus F.C. were a football team from Gibraltar. They played in the Gibraltar Second Division and the Rock Cup.
