= Leo F.C. =

Association football club in Gibraltar

Leo
- Full name: Leo Football Club
- Nickname: The Blue Lions
- Founded: 2004
- Dissolved: 2019
- Ground: Victoria Stadium, Gibraltar
- Capacity: 2,300
- 2018–19: Gibraltar Second Division, 6th
- Website: www.leofcgibraltar.com
Home colours	Away colours

Leo F.C. was a football team from Gibraltar. They played in the Gibraltar Second Division and the Rock Cup.

== History ==
=== Formation and Third Division years (2004–2008) ===
Leo FC originally formed as Leo Santos & Sons in 2004. The club started life in the Gibraltar Third Division, enduring a difficult season and finishing a disappointing second bottom of the 11 team league above only Req Duo Athletic by the end of the 2004–05 season. The next season, Leo Santos & Sons again finished 10th in the league, but did relatively better due to new entry Bay Side FC finishing bottom of the new 12 team table. Improvements became more apparent in the 2006–07 season, seeing a surprise 6th place finish for the club, while the following season saw them repeat the feat. However, both times they finished a considerable distance away from the promotion race, finishing nearly 30 points off the pace of champions Shamrock 101 and Sporting Club Gibraltar in 2007 and 2008, respectively.

=== Promotion to Second Division (2008–2011) ===
The summer of 2008 saw a significant restructuring of Gibraltar football by the Gibraltar Football Association. Reserve teams were removed from the football system and instead placed in a separate Reserves League, so the Third Division was abolished and all senior teams moved into the Gibraltar Second Division, among them Leo Santos & Sons. Buoyed by the unexpected promotion, and signing a number of players from the folded reserve sides, the club finished a surprise 5th place in their first season at the second level. The return of former Gibraltar football powerhouses Britannia XI in 2009 saw a less impressive 7th place in 2009–10, and the emergence of feeder clubs for the bigger teams from the Gibraltar Premier Division (such as Gibraltar Pilots, Pegasus and Red Imps) made it more difficult for other Second Division teams to sign players.

=== Name changes and league's entry to UEFA (2011–2017) ===
In order to compete with the new feeder clubs, in 2011 Leo signed a sponsorship deal that saw them change their name to Leo FC Parilla for the foreseeable future. However, performances off the pitch failed to improve and the club settled into the bottom half of the table. In 2013, the Gibraltar Football Association was accepted into UEFA as a full member, leading to a large influx of funds, interest and foreign players into Gibraltar football. As other teams enjoyed greater competitiveness as a result of this, Leo Parilla continued to see a decline in results and finished 13th of 14 teams in the 2014–15 season. At the end of this season, Leo changed their name to simply Leo Football Club. Subsequent seasons saw them return to their status as a mid-table team.

=== Takeovers and dissolution (2017–2019) ===
A major shakeup of the club occurred on 15 June 2017, which saw Dani Herrera appointed as Director of Football, while former Spain international footballer Catanha was appointed manager for the coming season, outlining a desire to secure promotion for the first time. However, Catanha left during pre-season and Norberto Alonso Simón was appointed in his place on 27 September. Simón left the club 21 December 2017, after the club was taken over, although he was re-appointed later on 12 January 2018. With an entirely rebuilt squad, Leo's form drastically improved, including a club record 8–0 victory over winter break league leaders Cannons, and the club moved up the table to finish an eventual 5th, above Cannons.

Simón left the club after the conclusion of the season, and was replaced by former Leo manager Rogelio Ramagge on 26 June 2018. However, poor performances led to him being sacked in the winter break, with Paco Sánchez coming in to see out the season. After the two tiers merged in Gibraltar in June 2019, former Glacis United manager Dani Amaya was appointed manager on 15 June, with Sánchez becoming his assistant. However, an attempted takeover was blocked by the Gibraltar Football Association in August 2019. Without the additional investment, the club resigned from the league and ceased operations.

== Club records ==
- Best league finish - 5th, Gibraltar Second Division: 2008–09, 2016–17, 2017–18
- Best Second Division Cup performance - Semi-finals: 2018–19
- Biggest win: 15–1 vs College 1975, 24 September 2015.
- Biggest defeat: 0-10 vs Bruno's Magpies, 20 January 2019
