= Gibraltar Phoenix F.C. =

Former association football club from Gibraltar

Gibraltar Phoenix
- Full name: Gibraltar Phoenix Football Club
- Founded: 2011; 15 years ago
- Dissolved: 2019; 7 years ago
- Ground: Victoria Stadium
- Capacity: 2,300
- 2018–19: Gibraltar Premier Division, 5th of 10
Home colours	Away colours	Third colours

Gibraltar Phoenix Football Club was a football club from Gibraltar.

It has participated in Gibraltar Premier Division and the Rock Cup until its dissolution in August 2019.

== History ==
Gibraltar Phoenix was founded in 2011, and was officially registered as a Gibraltar FA member in 2012.

Phoenix has the distinction of competing in the Gibraltar Premier Division, while failing to score a single point whole season. This happened in the 2013–14 Gibraltar Premier Division season, the first since the GFA's acceptance into UEFA, when they lost all 14 games and got relegated to the Gibraltar Second Division.

One season later, in Gibraltar Second Division, Phoenix finished in 4th place, 14 points behind the 2nd-placed Angels and the promotion spot, which would have secured them promotion back to the top flight at the first attempt.

After a rebrand, Phoenix finished 3rd in the Second Division during the 2015–16 season, six points behind Mons Calpe in second place, who were promoted via the playoff, and further 3 points behind Europa Point, who won the title.

The side lost their first two games of the 2016–17 season due to forfeits on account of the new Home Grown Player rule in effect in Gibraltar. Their first game, a 4–1 victory against Hound Dogs, was overturned in favour of the losing team, while their second game against title rivals Bruno's Magpies wasn't played at all, with the game being awarded to Magpies. After filling their quota for domestic players, Phoenix saw a turnaround in form, which included a club record 20–1 victory against Angels, sitting joint-top of the Second Division at the turn of the year. Phoenix secured the title on the penultimate week of the season, after an 11–0 victory over College 1975, returning to the top flight after a 3-year absence.

They finally managed to score their first ever top flight points on the opening fixture of the new Gibraltar Premier Division season, after an 2–1 victory over Mons Calpe.

In August 2019, the club withdrew from senior football, with club owners citing heavy losses in recent years and a lack of success in selling the club to potential investors as the main reasons to cease operations.

Old logo of Gibraltar Phoenix F.C., used from 2011 to 2015.

== Honours ==
- Gibraltar Second Division
  - Winners (1): 2016–17
- Gibraltar Division 2 Cup
  - Winners (1): 2017
