= Gibraltar United F.C. =

Association football club in Gibraltar

Gibraltar United F. C.
- Founded: 1943 (reformed 2014)
- Dissolved: 2019
- Ground: Victoria Stadium, Gibraltar
- Capacity: 2,000
- Owners: Pablo Dana; Michel Salgado
- President: Adrian Ballestero
- Manager: Paco Luna
- League: Gibraltar Premier Division
- 2018–19: Gibraltar Premier Division, 6th
Home colours	Away colours

Gibraltar United F.C. was a football team from Gibraltar. Founded in 1943 in the midst of World War II, they played in the Gibraltar Football League's Premier Division. In 2011 Gibraltar United joined forces with fellow local club Lions Football Club, with the club's new name Lions Gibraltar FC who played in Gibraltar's Premier Division. In 2014 the club announced their reformation as an independent club and played in the Gibraltar Football League's second tier once again in the 2014–15 season, winning promotion as champions.

== History ==
The club was founded by Aurelio Louis Danino a Gibraltarian journalist whose nom de plume was "Lubinox". The team was made up of local Gibraltarians who remained on the rock during the Second World War. As most of the civilian population was evacuated putting a halt to league football in Gibraltar over the war years, Gibraltar United would represent Gibraltarians and play against the UK based regiments and other military units serving in Gibraltar winning the Governor's Cup in their founding year of 1943. Once competitive football resumed on the Rock in 1946, United sealed their first league title. The club would dominate the next 10 years under Danino's presidency before entering a dry spell, winning a few more titles in the early 1960s with their last league title in 2001–02 - the last league title won by a side other than Lincoln Red Imps for 15 years before Europa's triumph in the 2016–17 season.

Despite the triumph in 2002 breaking nearly 50-year without success at the club (aside from 3 consecutive Rock Cup victories from 1999 to 2001), the club quickly began to see a decline in fortunes against the continued dominance of Lincoln, and rumours began to emerge that the historic club was close to ceasing operations, amidst talk of a rumour with lower-level club Lions FC to retain Gibraltar United's Premier Division place and adopt Lions' youth program. After merging with Lions in 2011 to form Lions Gibraltar, the club established itself as a mid-table Gibraltar Premier Division side. However, in 2014, after the Gibraltar Football Association was accepted into UEFA, the club became independent of Lions once again and competed in the Gibraltar Second Division. After a tight race with Angels and Europa Point, the club won the title and promotion to the Gibraltar Premier Division for the 2015–16 season, building a squad with strong focus on Gibraltarian footballers and hiring Manolo Sanchez Nuñez as manager. A difficult first season saw them finish narrowly above the relegation playoff, with an 8th-place finish securing safety.

In April 2017, the club entered partnerships with Turicum Bank and former Real Madrid defender Michel Salgado, with the latter becoming one of the new owners of the club along with Dubai-based businessman Pablo Dana. With survival confirmed at the end of the season with a 7th-place finish, it was announced that Salgado would oversee youth trials in June, as well as arranging all transfers in preparation for the next season. United overvalued their squad and did away with their 'local only' policy for the start of the 17/18 season though they still retained around 50% of the squad as local players with a fair number of both full and Under 21 and Under 19 Internationals. Manolo Hierro also joined the club as director of football soon after the 17/18 season started.

After a 4th-place finish in the 2017–18 season, manager Manolo left the club. Lucas Cazorla was hired in his place. In July 2018, Gibraltar United made international headlines when it became the first football club in the world to pay players in part with cryptocurrency, through a sponsorship with Quantocoin. Pablo Domingo Fernandez and former Sevilla FC goalkeeper Antonio Notario Caro also joined the technical staff in July 2018. However, on 31 July 2019 it was reported that Dana had pulled his support from Gibraltar United and that several players had left the club, having not been paid for several months. The club denied these reports later that day, though, stating that Dana was still a part of the club. However, it was revealed on 7 August that the club had until the following Monday to repay all its debts or face expulsion from the newly formed Gibraltar National League. The team subsequently folded.

In 2026, a team using the Gibraltar United name and crest entered the newly formed Gibraltar Masters League.

== Current squad ==
Squad as of 23 February 2019

Note: Flags indicate national team as defined under FIFA eligibility rules; some limited exceptions apply. Players may hold more than one non-FIFA nationality.

No.	Pos.	Nation	Player
5	DF	GIB	Erin Barnett (vice-captain)
6	MF	ESP	Carlos Carrasco
7	FW	NED	Achraf Nait Brahim
9	FW	ESP	Álvaro Castiella
10	MF	ESP	Dani Ponce
14	FW	GIB	Nathan Santos
16	FW	ESP	Francisco Álvarez
17	MF	ESP	Chico Rubio
22	DF	ESP	Moisés Suárez

No.	Pos.	Nation	Player
23	MF	GIB	Julio Bado
24	MF	GIB	Jamie Bosio (vice-captain)
26	FW	ESP	Alberto Zapata
28	DF	URU	Nicolás Márquez
35	GK	ESP	José Miguel González
—	GK	GIB	Christian Lopez
—	GK	GIB	Jordan Perez
—	MF	POR	Marco Meireles
—	FW	POR	Miguel Oliveira

== Club staff ==
Position	Name
Club Management
Manager	(Spain) Paco Luna
Assistant Manager	(Spain) Javier Sanchez Alfaro
Physical Trainer	(Spain) Pablo Domingo Fernandez
Goalkeeping Coach	(Spain) Antonio Notario
Physiotherapist	(Gibraltar) Gavin Viñales
Team Delegate	(Gibraltar) Francis Huart
Intermediate Team Coach	(England) Graham Malcolm
Board
President	(Gibraltar) Adrian Ballestero
Director of Football	(Spain) Manolo Hierro
Secretary	TBC
Assistant Secretary	(Gibraltar) Jonathan McNeice
	(Spain) David Diez Espagne

== Achievements ==
- Gibraltar Premier Division (11)
  - 1946–47, 1947–48, 1948–49, 1949–50, 1950–51, 195–54, 1959–60, 1961–62, 1963–64, 1964–65, 2001–02
- Gibraltar Second Division (2)
  - 1998–99, 2014–15
- Rock Cup (10)
  - 1946–47, 1953–54, 1958–59, 1962–63, 1963–64, 1964–65, 1965–66, 1998–99, 1999–2000, 2000–01
