= Gibraltar Second Division =

Association football league in Gibraltar

- Founded: 1909
- Folded: 2019
- Country: Gibraltar
- Confederation: UEFA
- Number of clubs: 7
- Level on pyramid: 2
- Promotion to: Gibraltar Premier Division
- Domestic cup: Rock Cup
- League cup: Gibraltar Division 2 Cup
- Last champions: Bruno's Magpies (1st title) (2018–19)
- Website: Gibraltar FA
- Current: 2018–19 Gibraltar Second Division

The Gibraltar Second Division was the second tier of football in the British Overseas Territory of Gibraltar, run by the Gibraltar Football Association (GFA). The league was founded in 1909 after the expansion of the Gibraltar Premier Division and as of the 2016–17 season contains 10 clubs. All of the sides competing were amateur. Teams in this division, along with the Gibraltar U-15 national team, entered the Rock Cup in the first round except for 3 clubs who received byes to the second round.

Promotion was not regular until 2007-08 due to the prevalence of reserve teams in the division. As of the 2016–17 season, league champions are automatically promoted, and the runners up enter a play-off with the second-from-bottom team in the Gibraltar Premier Division. However, in the 2014–15 season, the top two teams were automatically promoted with no relegation, due to the Premier Division expanding to 10 teams for the 2015–16 season onward. Until 2008, a Third Division also operated in which teams were regularly promoted and relegated between the two divisions.

In 2019 the league merged with the Gibraltar Premier Division to form the Gibraltar National League, ending 110 years of second division football on the Rock.

== Second Division 2018–19 ==
Club	Last season
Bruno's Magpies	3rd
College 1975	7th
Europa Point	4th
FC Hound Dogs	8th
Manchester 62	10th, Gibraltar Premier Division (relegated)
Olympique 13	2nd
Leo FC	5th

== List of champions ==
All results from RSSSF archives. Bold indicates the team was promoted.
Records before 1998 are unknown.

Season	Champions	Runners-up
1998–99	**Gibraltar United**	St Joseph's Reserves
1999–2000	Glacis United Reserves	**Pegasus**
2000–01	**Rock Wolves**	Glacis United Reserves
2001–02	St Joseph's Reserves	Manchester United Reserves
2002–03	Manchester United Reserves	Newcastle Reserves
2003–04	Newcastle Reserves	**St Theresa's**
2004–05	Manchester United Reserves	Glacis United Reserves
2005–06	Manchester United Reserves	Newcastle Reserves
2006–07	Shamrock 101	Pegasus
2007–08	Glacis United Reserves	**Shamrock 101**
2008–09	**College Cosmos**	Chelsea
2009–10	**Lynx**	FC Britannia XI
2010–11	Gib Pilots	**SJ Athletic**
2011–12	**Lynx**	College Europa
2012–13	**College Cosmos**	**Gibraltar Phoenix**
2013–14	**FC Britannia XI**	Mons Calpe
2014–15	**Gibraltar United**	**Angels**
2015–16	**Europa Point**	**Mons Calpe**
2016–17	**Gibraltar Phoenix**	Bruno's Magpies
2017–18	**Boca Gibraltar**	FC Olympique 13
2018–19	**Bruno's Magpies**	**Europa Point**

== See also ==
- Gibraltar Football League
- Gibraltar Premier Division
- Gibraltar Premier Cup
- Pepe Reyes Cup
