= 2025–26 Lincoln Red Imps F.C. season =

Lincoln Red Imps
2025–26 season
- Owner: Dylan Viagas
- Manager: Juanjo Bezares
- Gibraltar Football League: 1st
- Pepe Reyes Cup: Winners
- UEFA Champions League: Second qualifying round
- UEFA Europa League: Play-off round
- UEFA Conference League: League phase
- Top goalscorer: League: Toni García (9 goals); All: Tjay De Barr (14 goals)
Home colours	Away colours

During the 2025–26 season, Lincoln Red Imps competed in the Gibraltar Football League, Rock Cup, and UEFA Conference League.

== Season summary ==
This season marks the Red Imps' second appearance in the group stage or league phase of a major UEFA competition, following their qualification for the UEFA Conference League after previously reaching the same stage in the 2021–22 season.

On 17 August 2025, the Red Imps defeated Magpies 3–0 to win their 13th Pepe Reyes Cup, and their first since 2022.

On 23 October, the Red Imps beat Polish side Lech Poznań 2–1 to secure their first ever win in a group stage or league phase of a UEFA competition. On 11 December, the Red Imps score a late winner against SK Sigma Olomouc to claim a 2–1 Conference League victory in the first meeting between teams from Gibraltar and the Czech Republic in European competition history.

== First-team squad ==
As of 3 September 2025

No.	Pos.	Nation	Player
1	GK	ESP	Nauzet Santana
2	DF	ESP	Jesús Toscano
3	DF	ESP	Christian Rutjens
4	MF	GIB	Nicholas Pozo
5	DF	GHA	Ibrahim Ayew
6	DF	GIB	Bernardo Lopes (captain)
7	FW	GIB	Lee Casciaro
8	MF	ESP	Mandi
9	FW	PHI	Kike Gómez
10	FW	GIB	Tjay De Barr
11	MF	ESP	Juanje
13	GK	GIB	Jaylan Hankins
15	DF	ESP	Rafa Muñoz
16	DF	GIB	Tayler Carrington
18	FW	ESP	Toni García
19	MF	GIB	Kyle Clinton
20	DF	GIB	Ethan Britto
21	DF	ESP	Nano

No.	Pos.	Nation	Player
22	MF	GIB	Graeme Torrilla
23	MF	ESP	Joe
25	GK	GIB	Ryan Smith
27	GK	ESP	Curro Fernández
28	DF	GIB	Ryan Azopardi
29	MF	GIB	Lee Chipolina
31	FW	GIB	Jonathan Sciortino
35	MF	GIB	Jayvan Garro
36	DF	GIB	Alex Collado
69	DF	GIB	Julian Laguea
70	FW	ESP	Víctor Villacañas
71	DF	GIB	Javan Peacock
77	FW	GIB	Anthony Avellano
80	FW	SEN	Boubacar Sidik Dabo
—	MF	ESP	Borja Fernández
—	MF	GIB	Liam Jessop (on loan from Chesterfield)
—	FW	EGY	Ayman El Ghobashy
—	FW	CRO	Toni Kolega

== Competitions ==
=== Overall record ===
Competition	First match	Last match	Starting round	Final position	Record							
Competition	First match	Last match	Starting round	Final position	Pld	W	D	L	GF	GA	GD	Win %
Gibraltar Football League	14 September 2025	May 2026	Matchday 1	Winners	27	23	3	1	89	17	+72	85.19
Rock Cup				Winners	4	4	0	0	10	1	+9	100.00
Pepe Reyes Cup	17 August 2025		Final	Winners	1	1	0	0	3	0	+3	100.00
UEFA Champions League	8 July 2025	25 July 2025	First qualifying round phase	Second qualifying round	4	2	0	2	5	8	−3	50.00
UEFA Europa League	7 August 2025	28 August 2025	Third qualifying round	Play-off round	4	0	2	2	2	10	−8	0.00
UEFA Conference League	6 October 2025	18 December 2025	League phase	League phase	6	2	1	3	7	15	−8	33.33
Total					46	32	6	8	116	51	+65	69.57

Last updated: 21 December 2025
Source: Soccerway

=== Gibraltar Football League ===
==== League table ====
Pos	Team	Pld	W	D	L	GF	GA	GD	Pts	Qualification (Note: Teams play each other twice (22 matches), before the top six teams advance to the GFL Championship Group.)
1	Lincoln Red Imps	22	19	2	1	79	14	+65	59	Qualification for the GFL Championship Group.
2	St Joseph's	22	19	1	2	90	10	+80	58	Qualification for the GFL Championship Group.
3	Mons Calpe	22	15	1	6	55	24	+31	46 (Note: Ranked by goal difference, head-to-head points: Mons Calpe 3, Europa FC 3.Head-to-head goal difference: Mons Calpe 0, Europa FC 0.)	Qualification for the GFL Championship Group.
4	Europa	22	15	1	6	44	16	+28	46	Qualification for the GFL Championship Group.
5	Lions Gibraltar	22	12	2	8	47	34	+13	38	Qualification for the GFL Championship Group.

Source: Soccerway
Rules for classification: 1) Points; 2) Head-to-head points; 3) Head-to-head goal difference; 4) Fair Play
Notes:

Pos	Team	Pld	W	D	L	GF	GA	GD	Pts	Qualification	LIN	SJO	EFC	MON	LGI	LYN
1	Lincoln Red Imps (C)	27	23	3	1	89	17	+72	72	Qualification for the Champions League first qualifying round		1–0	2–0	2–1		4–1
2	St Joseph's	27	20	3	4	96	17	+79	63	Qualification for the Conference League first qualifying round					3–3	1–0
3	Europa	27	18	2	7	54	20	+34	56	Qualification for the Conference League first qualifying round		0–0		4–1		3–1
4	Mons Calpe	27	18	1	8	66	35	+31	55			3–2			3–1	
5	Lions Gibraltar	27	13	4	10	53	44	+9	43		1–1		0–3			

Source: Soccerway
Legend: Blue = home team win; Yellow = draw; Red = away team win.
Rules for classification: 1) Points; 2) Points in regular season; 3) Head-to-head points in regular season; 4) Head-to-head goal difference in regular season; 5) Head-to-head goals scored in regular season; 6) Head-to-head away goals scored in regular season (if two teams tied); 7) Goal difference; 8) Goals scored; 9) Fair play ranking; 10) Drawing of lots.
(C) Champions

==== Results summary ====
Overall								Home						Away					
Pld	W	D	L	GF	GA	GD	Pts	W	D	L	GF	GA	GD	W	D	L	GF	GA	GD
12	11	1	0	49	6	+43	34	7	0	0	34	3	+31	4	1	0	15	3	+12

Last updated: 21 December 2025.
Source: Soccerway

==== Results by round ====
Round	1	2	3	4	5	6	7	8	9	10	11	12	13	14	15	16	17	18	19	20	21	22
Ground	H	A	H	H	A	H	H	A	A	A	H	H	H	A	A	H	A	H	H	A	H	A
Result	W	W	W	W	W	W	W	D	W	W	W	W										
Position	8	6	5	3	4	4	3	4	3	2	3	2										
Points	3	6	9	12	15	18	21	22	25	28	31	34										

Updated to match(es) played on 21 December 2025. Source: Soccerway
A = Away; H = Home; W = Win; D = Draw; L = Loss; P = Postponed

==== Matches ====
13 September 2025 1	Lincoln Red Imps	4–0	Lions Gibraltar	Europa Sports Park
15:30 (14:30 UTC+1)	García 13'; De Barr 37' (pen.); Villacañas 49'; Pozo 90'	Soccerway; Red Imps

20 September 2025 2	Lynx	2–5	Lincoln Red Imps	Europa Sports Park
15:30 (14:30 UTC+1)	Farisato; De Souza	Soccerway; Red Imps	Dabo; García; De Barr

24 September 2025 3	Lincoln Red Imps	7–0	Magpies	Europa Sports Park
20:00 (19:00 UTC+1)	Dabo 12'; García 26'; Lopes 38'; Juanje 49'; De Barr 51' 59'; Toscano 87'	Soccerway; Red Imps		Referee: Jose Antonio Diaz Lorente

28 September 2025 4	Lincoln Red Imps	7–0	Europa Point	Victoria Stadium
18:30 (17:30 UTC+1)	Lopes 34'; García 42'; Juanje 48'; De Barr 61'; Kike 71' (pen.)	Soccerway; Red Imps

18 October 2025 5	College 1975	0–3	Lincoln Red Imps	Victoria Stadium
15:30 (14:30 UTC+1)		Soccerway

27 October 2025 6	Lincoln Red Imps	3–2	Manchester 62	Victoria Stadium
20:00 (19:00 UTC+1)		Soccerway

1 November 2025 7	Mons Calpe	0–3	Lincoln Red Imps	Victoria Stadium
15:30 (14:30 UTC+1)		Soccerway

23 November 2025 8	St Joseph's	0–3	Lincoln Red Imps	Victoria Stadium
15:30 (14:30 UTC+1)		Soccerway

30 November 2025 9	Glacis United	0–3	Lincoln Red Imps	Victoria Stadium
18:30 (17:30 UTC+1)		Soccerway

4 December 2025 10	Lincoln Red Imps	6–1	Glacis United	Victoria Stadium
20:00 (19:00 UTC+1)		Soccerway

7 December 2025 11	Lincoln Red Imps	4–0	Hound Dogs	Victoria Stadium
18:30 (17:30 UTC+1)		Soccerway

21 December 2025 12	Lincoln Red Imps	3–0	Lynx	Victoria Stadium
15:30 (14:30 UTC+1)		Soccerway

=== Pepe Reyes Cup ===
17 August 2025 Final	Lincoln Red Imps	3–0	Magpies	Europa Sports Park
20:00 (19:00 UTC+1)	Kike 19'; Chipolina 53'; De Barr 90+6' (pen.)	Report

=== UEFA Champions League ===
==== First qualifying round ====
The draw for the first qualifying round was held on 17 June 2025.

8 July 2025 First leg	Víkingur Gøta (Faroe Islands)	2–3	(Gibraltar) Lincoln Red Imps	Klaksvík, Faroe Islands
20:00 (19:00 UTC+1)	Johansen 28'; Vatnhamar 45+4' (pen.)	Report	Lopes 19', 31'; De Barr 38' (pen.)	Stadium: Við Djúpumýrar (Note: Víkingur Gøta played their home match at Við Djúpumýrar in Klaksvík, instead of their regular stadium, Sarpugerði, in Norðragøta, which did not meet UEFA requirements.); Attendance: 740; Referee: Lothar D'hondt (Belgium)

15 July 2025 Second leg	Lincoln Red Imps (Gibraltar)	1–0 (4–2 agg.)	(Faroe Islands) Víkingur Gøta	Europa Point, Gibraltar
17:30	De Barr 90+6'	Report		Stadium: Europa Sports Park (Note: Lincoln Red Imps played their home matches at Europa Sports Park, instead of the Victoria Stadium, due to renovation works.); Attendance: 758; Referee: Ben Mcmaster (Northern Ireland)

==== Second qualifying round ====
The draw for the second qualifying round was held on 18 June 2025.

22 July 2025 First leg	Lincoln Red Imps (Gibraltar)	0–1	(Serbia) Red Star Belgrade	Europa Point, Gibraltar
18:00		Report	Bruno Duarte 30'	Stadium: Europa Sports Park; Attendance: 622; Referee: Damian Kos (Poland)

29 July 2025 Second leg	Red Star Belgrade (Serbia)	5–1 (6–1 agg.)	(Gibraltar) Lincoln Red Imps	Belgrade, Serbia
21:00	Katai 8'; Ivanić 16'; Bruno Duarte 37'; Milson 44'; Ndiaye 75'	Report	De Barr 53'	Stadium: Red Star Stadium; Attendance: 31,241; Referee: António Nobre (Portugal)

=== UEFA Europa League ===
==== Third qualifying round ====
The draw for the third qualifying round was held on 21 July 2025.

7 August 2025 First leg	Lincoln Red Imps (Gibraltar)	1–1	(Armenia) Noah	Europa Point, Gibraltar
18:00	De Barr 45+9'	Report	Eteki 9'	Stadium: Europa Sports Park (Note: Lincoln Red Imps played their third qualifying round home match at Europa Sports Park, instead of their regular stagium, Victoria Stadium in Gibraltar, due to renovation works.); Attendance: 728; Referee: Filip Glova (Slovakia)

14 August 2025 Second leg	Noah (Armenia)	0–0 (a.e.t.) (1–1 agg.) (5–6 p)	(Gibraltar) Lincoln Red Imps	Abovyan, Armenia
18:00 (20:00 UTC+4)		Report		Stadium: Abovyan City Stadium; Attendance: 3,100; Referee: Sebastian Gishamer (Austria)
	Penalties
	Mulahusejnović (penalty scored); Manvelyan (penalty scored); Muradyan (penalty missed); Jakoliš (penalty scored); Hambardzumyan (penalty scored); Þórarinsson (penalty scored); Eteki (penalty missed)		(penalty missed) Nano; (penalty scored) De Barr; (penalty scored) Juanje; (penalty scored) Gómez; (penalty scored) Rutjens; (penalty scored) Clinton; (penalty scored) Lopes

==== Play-off round ====
The draw for the play-off round was held on 4 August 2025.

21 August 2025 First leg	Lincoln Red Imps (Gibraltar)	0–4	(Portugal) Braga	Faro/Loulé, Portugal
21:00 (20:00 UTC+1)		Report	Gómez 34'; Zalazar 39', 80'; Víctor 90+1'	Stadium: Estádio Algarve (Note: Lincoln Red Imps played their play-off round home match at the Estádio Algarve in Faro/Loulé, Portugal, instead of their regular stadium, Victoria Stadium in Gibraltar, due to renovation works.); Attendance: 1,988; Referee: Morten Krogh (Denmark)

28 August 2025 Second leg	Braga (Portugal)	5–1 (9–1 agg.)	(Gibraltar) Lincoln Red Imps	Braga, Portugal
21:00 (20:00 UTC+1)	Carvalho 12'; Martínez 41', 45+1'; Vidigal 77'; Víctor 82'	Report	Gómez 89'	Stadium: Estádio Municipal de Braga; Attendance: 12,125; Referee: Erik Lambrechts (Belgium)

=== UEFA Conference League ===
==== League phase ====
Pos	Team	Pld	W	D	L	GF	GA	GD	Pts	Qualification
24	(Football Association of the Czech Republic) Sigma Olomouc	6	2	1	3	7	9	−2	7	Advance to knockout phase play-offs (unseeded)
25	(Romanian Football Federation) Universitatea Craiova	6	2	1	3	6	8	−2	7	
26	(Gibraltar Football Association) Lincoln Red Imps	6	2	1	3	7	15	−8	7	
27	(Ukrainian Association of Football) Dynamo Kyiv	6	2	0	4	9	9	0	6	
28	(Polish Football Association) Legia Warsaw	6	2	0	4	8	8	0	6	

Source: UEFA
Rules for classification: League phase tiebreakers

Round	1	2	3	4	5	6
Ground	A	H	H	A	H	A
Result	L	W	D	L	W	L
Position	36	21	22	26	24	26
Points	0	3	4	4	7	7

Source: UEFA
A = Away; H = Home; W = Win; D = Draw; L = Loss

Win Draw Loss Fixtures

2 October 2025 1	Zrinjski Mostar (Bosnia and Herzegovina)	5–0	(Gibraltar) Lincoln Red Imps	Mostar, Bosnia and Herzegovina
18:45	Bilbija 12'; Dujmović 22'; Jakovljević 40'; Damașcan 69'; Mikić 85'	Report		Stadium: Stadion pod Bijelim Brijegom; Attendance: 4,200; Referee: Sigurd Kringstad (Norway)

23 October 2025 2	Lincoln Red Imps (Gibraltar)	2–1	(Poland) Lech Poznań	Europa Point, Gibraltar
21:00	K. Gómez 33'; Rutjens 88'	Report	Ishak 77' (pen.)	Stadium: Europa Sports Park; Attendance: 1,208; Referee: Chrysovalantis Theouli (Cyprus)

6 November 2025 3	Lincoln Red Imps (Gibraltar)	1–1	(Croatia) Rijeka	Europa Point, Gibraltar
21:00	K. Gómez 83'	Report	Fruk 41'	Stadium: Europa Sports Park; Attendance: 1,194; Referee: Philip Farrugia (Malta)

27 November 2025 4	Hamrun Spartans (Malta)	3–1	(Gibraltar) Lincoln Red Imps	Ta' Qali, Malta
18:45	El Fanis 65'; Smailagić 74'; Ćorić 90+2'	Report	Lopes 57'	Stadium: National Stadium (Note: Hamrun Spartans will play their home matches at National Stadium, Ta' Qali, instead of their regular stadium, Victor Tedesco Stadium, Hamrun, which did not meet UEFA requirements.); Attendance: 2,134; Referee: Jovan Kochevski (North Macedonia)

11 December 2025 5	Lincoln Red Imps (Gibraltar)	2–1	(Czech Republic) Sigma Olomouc	Europa Point, Gibraltar
21:00	Koutný 19' (o.g.); Pozo 73'	Report	Vašulín 8'	Stadium: Europa Sports Park; Attendance: 686; Referee: Bence Csonka (Hungary)

18 December 2025 6	Legia Warsaw (Poland)	4–1	(Gibraltar) Lincoln Red Imps	Warsaw, Poland
21:00	Čolak 21'; Kapustka 62'; Rajović 70'; Bichakhchyan 83'	Report	De Barr 89'	Stadium: Polish Army Stadium; Attendance: 9,429; Referee: Danilo Nikolić (Serbia)

== Statistics ==
=== Goalscorers ===
Rank	Pos.	Player	Football League	Rock Cup	Pepe Reyes Cup	Champions League	Europa League	Conference League	Total
1	FW	(Gibraltar) Tjay De Barr	8	0	1	3	1	1	14
2	FW	(Philippines) Kike	7	0	1	0	1	2	11
3	FW	(Spain) Toni García	9	0	0	0	0	0	9
4	DF	(Gibraltar) Bernardo Lopes	5	0	0	2	0	1	8
5	MF	(Gibraltar) Nicholas Pozo	6	0	0	0	0	1	7
6	FW	(Senegal) Boubacar Sidik Dabo	4	0	0	0	0	0	4
7	MF	(Spain) Juanje	2	0	0	0	0	0	2
7	MF	(Spain) Víctor Villacañas	2	0	0	0	0	0	2
7	FW	(Egypt) Ayman El Ghobashy	2	0	0	0	0	0	2
10	MF	(Spain) Mandi	1	0	0	0	0	0	1
10	MF	(Gibraltar) Liam Jessop	1	0	0	0	0	0	1
10	MF	(Gibraltar) Lee Chipolina	0	0	1	0	0	0	1
10	DF	(Spain) Jesús Toscano	1	0	0	0	0	0	1
10	DF	(Spain) Christian Rutjens	0	0	0	0	0	1	1
Own goals			1	0	0	0	0	1	2
Totals			49	0	3	5	2	7	66

Last updated: 21 December 2025.
