= 2025–26 Gibraltar Football League =

Gibraltar Football League
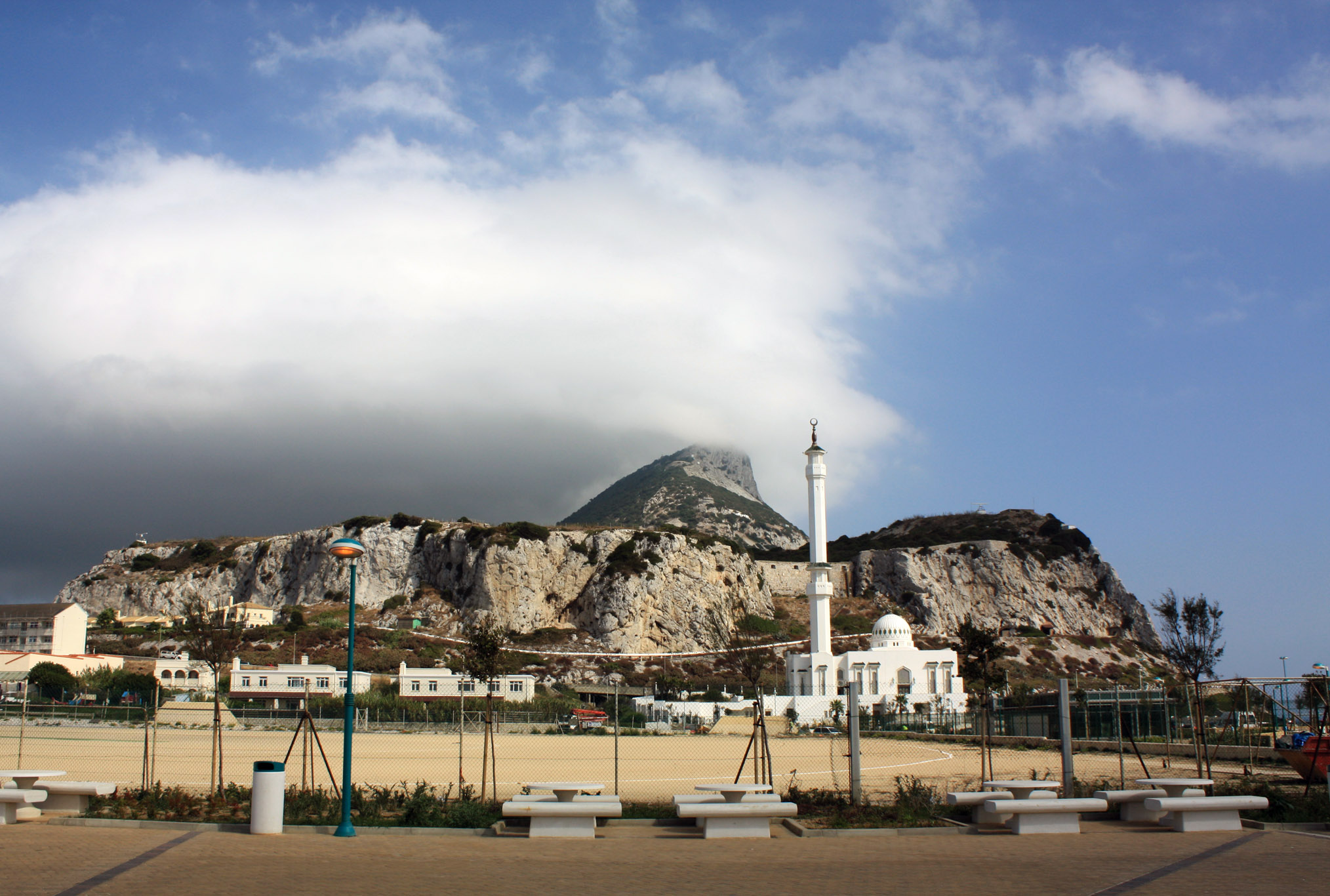
- The Europa Sports Park, where each match is played
- Season: 2025–26
- Dates: 15 August 2025 – 26 April 2026
- Champions: Lincoln Red Imps; 6th GFL title 30th overall
- Champions League: Lincoln Red Imps
- Conference League: St Joseph's F.C. Europa
- Matches: 147
- Goals: 522 (3.55 per match)
- Top goalscorer: Manu Toledano (30 goals)
- Best goalkeeper: Bradley Banda (14 clean sheets)
- Biggest home win: St Joseph's 10–0 Manchester 62
- Biggest away win: Manchester 62 0–10 Lincoln Red Imps
- Highest scoring: St Joseph's 10–0 Manchester 62
- Longest winning run: Lincoln Red Imps; St Joseph's (7 wins)
- Longest unbeaten run: St Joseph's (14 games)
- Longest winless run: Hound Dogs (15 games)
- Longest losing run: Hound Dogs; Manchester 62 (7 losses)
- All statistics correct as of complete.

The 2025–26 Gibraltar Football League season is the seventh season of the Gibraltar Football League in Gibraltar (and fourth under its current name), and the 127th season of football on the territory overall. Lincoln Red Imps are the reigning champions, winning their fourth successive title on the final weekend of the season to beat competition from title rivals St Joseph's on their head-to-head record. Due to the league's fall down the UEFA coefficient rankings, this season only 2 teams qualified for the UEFA Conference League. For the first time since the 2020–21 season, 12 teams will contest the league.

The winners will qualify for the 2026–27 UEFA Champions League first qualifying round. The runners-up and Rock Cup winners will qualify for the 2026–27 UEFA Conference League first qualifying round.

== Format ==
The 2025–26 season is set to continue with the same format used the previous season. Instead of playing one round of fixtures before splitting, teams will instead play each other twice for a total of 22 games this season. After the second round of games, the top 6 enter the GFL Championship Group, where each team plays each other once to decide the league champion. However, the Challenge Group has been scrapped.

Due to the continued reconstruction of Victoria Stadium, games will continue to be played at the Europa Sports Park this season.

== Teams ==
Location of the stadia where all teams play

FCB Magpies merged with youth side Calpe City on 1 June 2025, becoming Calpe City Magpies - however, due to delays in registering the new entity, they will remain as FC Magpies for one more season. After six years playing in the Gibraltar Intermediate League, GFL founding members Hound Dogs announced they would play in the GFL for the first time on 12 May 2025. That same day, the Gibraltar FA released the licensing awards for the 2025–26 season. Receiving the UEFA Club Licence were Lincoln Red Imps, St Joseph's, FCB Magpies and Lions Gibraltar. The GFA Gold Licence was awarded to College 1975, Europa Point, Glacis United, Manchester 62, Lynx, Europa and Mons Calpe. Hound Dogs were given the GFA Silver Licence.

Note: Flags indicate national team as has been defined under FIFA eligibility rules. Players may hold more than one non-FIFA nationality.

Team	Manager	Captain	Kit manufacturer	Club sponsor	2024–25
College 1975	(Spain) Óscar León	(Spain) Javi Anaya	Nike		8th
Europa	(Italy) Michele Di Piedi	(Gibraltar) Aymen Mouelhi	Kappa	Turicum Private Bank	3rd
Europa Point	(Argentina) Claudio Racino	(Argentina) Ivan Morán	Custimoo	Mobill	11th
Glacis United	(England) Jonny Elwood	(England) Michael Bakare	Meyba	VIA Sports Experiences	7th
Hound Dogs	(Republic of Ireland) Ryan McCarthy	(England) Zak Ahmed	Joma	Boluda Towage	GIL, 9th
Lincoln Red Imps	(Spain) Juanjo Bezares	(Gibraltar) Bernardo Lopes	Givova	Bet365	1st
Lions Gibraltar	(England) Wally Downes	(Gibraltar) Shea Breakspear	VX3	GibSams	6th
Lynx	(Spain) Rafael Berges	(Gibraltar) Michael Ruiz	Givova	EWMS	9th
FC Magpies	(Netherlands) Youri Loen	(Gibraltar) Kevagn Ronco	Macron		5th
Manchester 62	(Spain) José Galán	(Spain) José Cañas	Joma		4th
Mons Calpe	(Spain) Juan Marí Sánchez	(Spain) Jesús Ayala	Givova	FanPlay 365	10th
St Joseph's	(Spain) Alberto Cifuentes	(Spain) Juanma	Macron	Sprint Sports	2nd

=== Managerial changes ===
Team	Outgoing manager	Manner of departure	Date of vacancy	Position in table	Incoming manager	Date of appointment
Hound Dogs	(Gibraltar) Chris Gomez	Resigned	15 May 2025	Pre-season	(Republic of Ireland) Ryan McCarthy	15 May 2025
Lincoln Red Imps	(Spain) Juanjo Bezares	Interim spell made permanent	16 May 2025	Pre-season	(Spain) Juanjo Bezares	16 May 2025
Europa Point	(Spain) Roberto Carrasco	Appointed Head of Youth	21 May 2025	Pre-season	(Spain) Brandon Mora	12 June 2025
Glacis United	(England) Michael Bakare	End of contract	1 July 2025	Pre-season	(Spain) Miguel Ángel Berlanga	1 July 2025
FC Magpies	(Gibraltar) Terrence Jolley	End of interim spell	1 July 2025	Pre-season	(Netherlands) Youri Loen	1 July 2025
Lions Gibraltar	(Northern Ireland) Raymond Alexander	End of interim spell	25 July 2025	Pre-season	(England) Wally Downes	25 July 2025
Manchester 62	(Gibraltar) Luis McCoy	Interim spell made permanent	1 August 2025	Pre-season	(Gibraltar) Luis McCoy	1 August 2025
Europa Point	(Spain) Brandon Mora	Resigned	1 August 2025	Pre-season	(Spain) Roberto Carrasco (interim)	1 August 2025
Europa Point	(Spain) Roberto Carrasco	End of interim spell	21 August 2025	12th	(Argentina) Claudio Racino	21 August 2025
Glacis United	(Spain) Miguel Ángel Berlanga	Moved to assistant coach	23 August 2025	10th	(Spain) José Galán (interim)	29 August 2025
Glacis United	(Spain) José Galán (interim)	End of interim spell	12 September 2025	7th	(Netherlands) Bennie Brinkman (interim)	12 September 2025
Lynx	(Spain) Yiyi Pérez	Mutual consent	16 September 2025	3rd	(Gibraltar) Albert Parody (interim)	16 September 2025
Glacis United	(Netherlands) Bennie Brinkman	End of interim spell	6 November 2025	12th	(England) Jonny Elwood	6 November 2025
Lynx	(Gibraltar) Albert Parody	End of interim spell	14 November 2025	6th	(Spain) Rafael Berges	14 November 2025
Manchester 62	(Gibraltar) Luis McCoy	Resigned	15 November 2025	7th	(Ghana) Ishmael Kofi Antwi (interim)	15 November 2025
Manchester 62	(Ghana) Ishmael Kofi Antwi	End of interim spell	26 November 2025	8th	(Gibraltar) Allen Bula (interim)	26 November 2025
St Joseph's	(Spain) Abraham Paz	Signed by Antequera	30 November 2025	1st	(Spain) Alberto Cifuentes	2 December 2025
Manchester 62	(Gibraltar) Allen Bula	End of interim spell	20 December 2025	9th	(Spain) José Galán	10 January 2026

== Regular season ==
During the regular season, each team faced each other twice before the league is split into two (with only the top six teams advancing to the GFL Championship Group).

=== League table ===
Pos	Team	Pld	W	D	L	GF	GA	GD	Pts	Qualification (Note: Teams play each other twice (22 matches), before the top six teams advance to the GFL Championship Group.)
1	Lincoln Red Imps	22	19	2	1	79	14	+65	59	Qualification for the GFL Championship Group.
2	St Joseph's	22	19	1	2	90	10	+80	58	Qualification for the GFL Championship Group.
3	Mons Calpe	22	15	1	6	55	24	+31	46 (Note: Ranked by goal difference, head-to-head points: Mons Calpe 3, Europa FC 3.Head-to-head goal difference: Mons Calpe 0, Europa FC 0.)	Qualification for the GFL Championship Group.
4	Europa	22	15	1	6	44	16	+28	46	Qualification for the GFL Championship Group.
5	Lions Gibraltar	22	12	2	8	47	34	+13	38	Qualification for the GFL Championship Group.
6	Lynx	22	10	4	8	34	33	+1	34	Qualification for the GFL Championship Group.
7	FC Magpies	22	8	2	12	22	37	−15	26	
8	Europa Point	22	7	1	14	31	61	−30	22	
9	College 1975	22	3	5	14	15	45	−30	14	
10	Glacis United	22	3	3	16	18	57	−39	12	
11	Hound Dogs	22	1	5	16	10	66	−56	8	
12	Manchester 62 (Note: Manchester 62 were deducted six points due to failure to comply with licensing requirements. A further six points were deducted on 6 February 2026.) (E)	22	6	1	15	29	77	−48	7	Folded post-season

Source: Soccerway
Rules for classification: 1) Points; 2) Head-to-head points; 3) Head-to-head goal difference; 4) Fair Play
(E) Folded after failing to obtain license for next season

=== Results ===
Home \ Away	COL	EFC	EPO	GLA	HOU	LIN	LGI	LYN	FCM	MAN	MON	SJO
College 1975		0–1	3–4	0–1	1–1	0–3	0–2	0–0	0–2	1–1	0–5	1–5
Europa	1–0		2–0	5–1	6–0	0–0	3–2	0–2	2–1	2–1	1–2	0–1
Europa Point	1–0	0–3		3–2	0–3	1–2	2–1	2–2	0–3	1–0	1–5	0–7
Glacis United	1–1	0–2	3–1		0–0	0–3	0–5	2–3	0–1	1–3	0–4	0–4
Hound Dogs	0–2	0–3	0–7	1–1		0–3	1–1	0–4	0–3	1–3	0–4	0–5
Lincoln Red Imps	4–0	3–1	7–0	6–1	4–0		4–0	3–0	7–0	3–2	3–0	1–4
Lions Gibraltar	4–1	1–0	3–2	2–1	5–1	1–2		0–1	3–2	7–0	0–3	0–4
Lynx	0–1	0–2	3–1	2–0	2–0	2–5	1–2		0–0	0–1	1–2	0–7
FC Magpies	0–1	0–3	0–1	3–1	1–0	1–2	1–1	1–3		2–2	2–1	0–2
Manchester 62	3–4	0–5	4–3	0–3	4–1	0–10	2–4	0–5	0–1		2–4	0–5
Mons Calpe	2–0	0–1	2–1	2–0	1–1	0–3	0–2	5–2	3–0	6–0		1–3
St Joseph's	4–0	2–1	6–0	6–0	6–0	1–1	3–1	0–1	4–0	10–0	1–3	

Source: Soccerway
Legend: Blue = home team win; Yellow = draw; Red = away team win.

== GFL Championship Group ==
The top six teams from the regular season contest the GFL Championship Group to decide the league champion. Results from the regular season were carried over into this round.

Pos	Team	Pld	W	D	L	GF	GA	GD	Pts	Qualification	LIN	SJO	EFC	MON	LGI	LYN
1	Lincoln Red Imps (C)	27	23	3	1	89	17	+72	72	Qualification for the Champions League first qualifying round		1–0	2–0	2–1		4–1
2	St Joseph's	27	20	3	4	96	17	+79	63	Qualification for the Conference League first qualifying round					3–3	1–0
3	Europa	27	18	2	7	54	20	+34	56	Qualification for the Conference League first qualifying round		0–0		4–1		3–1
4	Mons Calpe	27	18	1	8	66	35	+31	55			3–2			3–1	
5	Lions Gibraltar	27	13	4	10	53	44	+9	43		1–1		0–3			
6	Lynx	27	10	4	13	38	45	−7	34					2–3	0–1	

Source: Soccerway
Legend: Blue = home team win; Yellow = draw; Red = away team win.
Rules for classification: 1) Points; 2) Points in regular season; 3) Head-to-head points in regular season; 4) Head-to-head goal difference in regular season; 5) Head-to-head goals scored in regular season; 6) Head-to-head away goals scored in regular season (if two teams tied); 7) Goal difference; 8) Goals scored; 9) Fair play ranking; 10) Drawing of lots.
(C) Champions

== Season statistics ==
=== Scoring ===
==== Top scorers ====
Rank	Player	Club	Goals
1	(Spain) Manu Toledano	Mons Calpe	30
2	(Spain) Pablo Rodríguez	St Joseph's	21
3	(England) Mikael Ndjoli	Lions Gibraltar	20
4	(Spain) Javi Forján	St Joseph's	17
5	(Philippines) Kike Gómez	Lincoln Red Imps	16
6	(Argentina) Lucas Rebagliati	Lions Gibraltar	14
7	(Portugal) Nuno Miguel	Europa Point	11
7	(Gibraltar) Tjay De Barr	Lincoln Red Imps	11
7	(Spain) Toni García	Lincoln Red Imps	11
10	(Gibraltar) Nicholas Pozo	Lincoln Red Imps	10

==== Hat-tricks ====
Player	For	Against	Result	Date
(England) Mikael Ndjoli	Lions Gibraltar	Manchester 62	4–2 (A)	29 September 2025
(Spain) Manu Toledano	Mons Calpe	Lynx	5–2 (H)	19 October 2025
(Spain) Manu Toledano^{4}	Mons Calpe	Europa Point	5–1 (A)	24 October 2025
(Spain) Javi Anaya	College 1975	Manchester 62	4–3 (A)	2 November 2025
(Portugal) Nuno Miguel^{4}	Europa Point	Hound Dogs	7–0 (A)	28 November 2025
(Spain) Juanfri	St Joseph's	Manchester 62	10–0 (H)	5 December 2025
(England) Mikael Ndjoli	Lions Gibraltar	Manchester 62	7–0 (H)	12 January 2026
(Argentina) Lucas Rebagiati	Lions Gibraltar	Manchester 62	7–0 (H)	12 January 2026
(Spain) Manu Toledano	Mons Calpe	Lions Gibraltar	3–0 (A)	19 January 2026
(Egypt) Ayman El Ghobashy	Lincoln Red Imps	Manchester 62	10–0 (A)	8 February 2026
(Spain) Pablo Rodríguez	St Joseph's	Europa Point	7–0 (A)	3 March 2026
(Spain) Javi Forján	St Joseph's	Lions Gibraltar	3–3 (H)	26 April 2026

=== Clean sheets ===
Rank	Player	Club	Clean sheets
1	(Gibraltar) Bradley Banda	St Joseph's	14
2	(Gibraltar) Christian Lopez	Europa	8
2	(Spain) Nauzet Santana	Lincoln Red Imps	8
4	(Gibraltar) Jaylan Hankins	Lincoln Red Imps	7
4	(Gibraltar) Victor Huart	Lynx	7
4	(Argentina) Marcos Zappacosta	FC Magpies (Note: Includes 4 clean sheets for Europa.)	7
7	(Spain) Iván Villanueva	Mons Calpe	6
8	(Italy) Camillo De Luca	Europa	4
9	(Spain) Borja Valadés	College 1975	3
9	(Gibraltar) Tom Chakraverty	Europa Point	3
9	(Poland) Konrad Skuza	Lions Gibraltar	3
9	(Spain) Sergio Fúnez	FC Magpies	3
9	(Argentina) Christian Fraiz	Mons Calpe	3

== See also ==
- 2025–26 Peninsula Rock Cup
