= 2017 Pepe Reyes Cup =

Lincoln Red Imps	Europa
2	2
- Lincoln Red Imps won 3–1 on penalties
- Date: 24 September 2017
- Venue: Victoria Stadium, Gibraltar
- Referee: Jason Barcelo

The 2017 Pepe Reyes Cup was played on 24 September 2017 at Victoria Stadium in Gibraltar. This was the 17th Pepe Reyes Cup and was played by Lincoln Red Imps, runners-up of the 2016–17 Gibraltar Premier Division and the 2017 Rock Cup, and Europa, winners of the 2016–17 Gibraltar Premier Division and the 2017 Rock Cup. Lincoln Red Imps won 3–1 on penalties.

== Route to the final ==
Europa's Double meant Lincoln Red Imps qualified after they finished second in the 2016–17 Gibraltar Premier Division.

== Match details ==
24 September 2017
19:00 CET

Lincoln Red Imps	2–2 (a.e.t.)	Europa
Vincueria 75', 103'	Report	Gomez Bernal 35', 93'
Penalties
Calderon Vallejo (penalty scored); Falu Aranda (penalty scored); Nayar (penalty missed); De Barr (penalty scored)	3–1	(penalty missed) Roldán Méndez; (penalty missed) Enrique Carreño; (penalty scored) García Montero; (penalty missed) Gomez Bernal

Victoria Stadium, Gibraltar
Referee: Jason Barcelo

GK	1	(Spain) Manuel Soler
DF	2	(Gibraltar) Jean-Carlos Garcia
FW	7	(Gibraltar) Lee Casciaro	(substituted off) 89'
MF	8	(Argentina) Sebastián Nayar
FW	9	(Spain) Rafael Vincueria
DF	14	(Gibraltar) Roy Chipolina (c)
MF	18	(Gibraltar) Anthony Hernandez
DF	22	(Gibraltar) Alain Pons	(substituted off) 78'
DF	23	(Spain) Álvaro Oliver	Booked
DF	34	(Gibraltar) Jason Pusey	Booked	(substituted off) 59'
FW	89	(Spain) Diego Martínez Macarro
Substitutes:
GK	27	(Spain) Raúl Navas
MF	17	(Gibraltar) Leon Clinton
MF	19	(Spain) Antonio Calderón Vallejo		(substituted on) 59'
DF	24	(Gibraltar) Ethan Britto	Booked	(substituted on) 78'
MF	28	(Gibraltar) Andre Tjay De Barr	Booked	(substituted on) 89'
Manager:
(Uruguay) Julio César Ribas

GK	1	(Spain) Javi Muñoz (c)	Booked
FW	2	(Gibraltar) Sykes Garro	(substituted off) 73'
MF	8	(Spain) Alejandro Rodríguez Rivas	Booked Sent off (straight red)
DF	9	(Spain) Enrique Gómez Bernal
MF	10	(Spain) Jorge Pina Roldán	(substituted off) 88'
MF	11	(Spain) Antonio García Montero	Booked
DF	14	(Spain) Jesús Toscano	Booked
FW	17	(Spain) Guillermo Roldán	Booked
DF	21	(Spain) Olmo Gonzalez	(substituted off) 99'
MF	22	(Argentina) Martín Belforti
DF	42	(Spain) Alberto Merino Sanchez
Substitutes:
GK	26	(Spain) Jose Manuel Camara Vellido
DF	2	(Gibraltar) Ethan Jolley
FW	4	(Spain) José Manuel Rodríguez Gutiérrez	(substituted on) 99'
MF	16	(Spain) José Manuel Gallego Campos
FW	18	(Spain) Yeray Romero Fierro
FW	19	(Gibraltar) Michael Yome	(substituted on) 73'
DF	23	(Spain) Enrique Carreño	(substituted on) 88'
Manager:
(Spain) Juan Jose Gallardo

Assistant referees:
Juan Jose Villada
Denis Perez
Fourth official:
Patrick Canepa

Match rules

- 90 minutes.
- 30 minutes of extra-time if necessary.
- Penalty shoot-out if scores still level.
- Maximum of seven named substitutes.
- Maximum of three substitutions.
