= Nicholas Pozo =

Gibraltarian footballer

Personal information
- Full name: Nicholas Charles Pozo
- Date of birth: 19 January 2005 (age 21)
- Place of birth: Gibraltar
- Height: 1.84 m (6 ft 0 in)
- Position: Midfielder

Team information
- Current team: Boston United
- Number: 30

Youth career
- –2015: Atlético Zabal
- 2015–2024: Cádiz

Senior career*
| Years | Team | Apps | (Gls) |
| 2024–2026 | Lincoln Red Imps | 30 | (10) |
| 2025 | → Europa (loan) | 5 | (1) |
| 2026– | Boston United | 5 | (0) |

International career^{‡}
| 2021 | Gibraltar U17 | 4 | (0) |
| 2021– | Gibraltar U21 | 4 | (0) |
| 2022– | Gibraltar | 31 | (0) |
- * Club domestic league appearances and goals as of 10 October 2026 ‡ National team caps and goals as of 18 November 2026

Nicholas Charles Pozo (born 19 January 2005) is a Gibraltarian professional footballer who plays as a midfielder for National League side Boston United and the Gibraltar national team.

== Club career ==
In 2015, he joined the youth academy of Cádiz. In May 2023, after eight years playing at various youth levels for Cádiz and its affiliate team Balón de Cádiz, Pozo signed his first senior contract at the club, putting pen to paper on a two-year deal. However, despite initially being set to play for Cádiz C in the 2024–25 season, Pozo announced his departure on 13 August 2024. He signed for Lincoln Red Imps the same day.

On 1 February 2025, after seeing chances limited at Lincoln, Pozo joined rivals Europa on loan for the rest of the season. He made his debut the same day in the Rock Cup match against Mons Calpe. The next season was a considerable breakthrough as he scored 10 goals in 22 league appearances, alongside his first goal in UEFA competition when he netted the winner against Czech side Sigma Olomouc in the UEFA Conference League.

On 24 June 2026, Pozo signed for Boston United.

== International career ==
Nicholas Pozo made his senior international debut for Gibraltar on the 5 June 2022 against North Macedonia.

== Career statistics ==
=== Club ===
As of match played on 17 October 2026

Club statistics
| Club | Season | League | | | National Cup (Note: Includes Rock Cup, FA Cup.) | | League Cup | | Continental | | Other | | Total | |
| Club | Season | Division | Apps | Goals | Apps | Goals | Apps | Goals | Apps | Goals | Apps | Goals | Apps | Goals |
|---|---|---|---|---|---|---|---|---|---|---|---|---|---|---|
| Lincoln Red Imps | 2024–24 | Gibraltar Football League | 8 | 0 | 0 | 0 | — | | 1 (Note: Appearance in UEFA Conference League) | 0 | 1 (Note: Appearance in Pepe Reyes Cup) | 0 | 10 | 0 |
| Lincoln Red Imps | 2025–26 | Gibraltar Football League | 22 | 10 | 3 | 0 | — | | 12 (Note: Four appearances in UEFA Champions League, three appearances in UEFA Europa League, five appearances and one goal in UEFA Conference League) | 1 | 0 | 0 | 37 | 11 |
| Lincoln Red Imps | Total | | 30 | 10 | 3 | 0 | — | | 13 | 1 | 1 | 0 | 47 | 11 |
| Europa (loan) | 2024–25 | Gibraltar Football League | 5 | 1 | 1 | 0 | — | | — | | 0 | 0 | 6 | 1 |
| Boston United | 2026–27 | National League | 5 | 0 | 1 | 0 | 2 | 0 | — | | 0 | 0 | 8 | 0 |
| Career total | | | 40 | 11 | 5 | 0 | 2 | 0 | 13 | 1 | 1 | 0 | 61 | 12 |

=== International ===
As of match played 16 November 2026

Appearances and goals by national team and year
| National team | Year | Apps | Goals |
|---|---|---|---|
Gibraltar U17
| Gibraltar U17 | 2021 | 4 | 0 |
| Total | | 4 | 0 |
Gibraltar U21
| Gibraltar U21 | 2021 | 2 | 0 |
| Gibraltar U21 | 2022 | 1 | 0 |
| Gibraltar U21 | 2023 | 0 | 0 |
| Gibraltar U21 | 2024 | 1 | 0 |
| Total | | 4 | 0 |
Gibraltar
| Gibraltar | 2022 | 3 | 0 |
| Gibraltar | 2023 | 8 | 0 |
| Gibraltar | 2024 | 4 | 0 |
| Gibraltar | 2025 | 6 | 0 |
| Gibraltar | 2026 | 10 | 0 |
| Total | | 31 | 0 |

== Honours ==
Lincoln Red Imps

- Rock Cup: 2025–26
