= Tjay De Barr =

Gibraltar football player

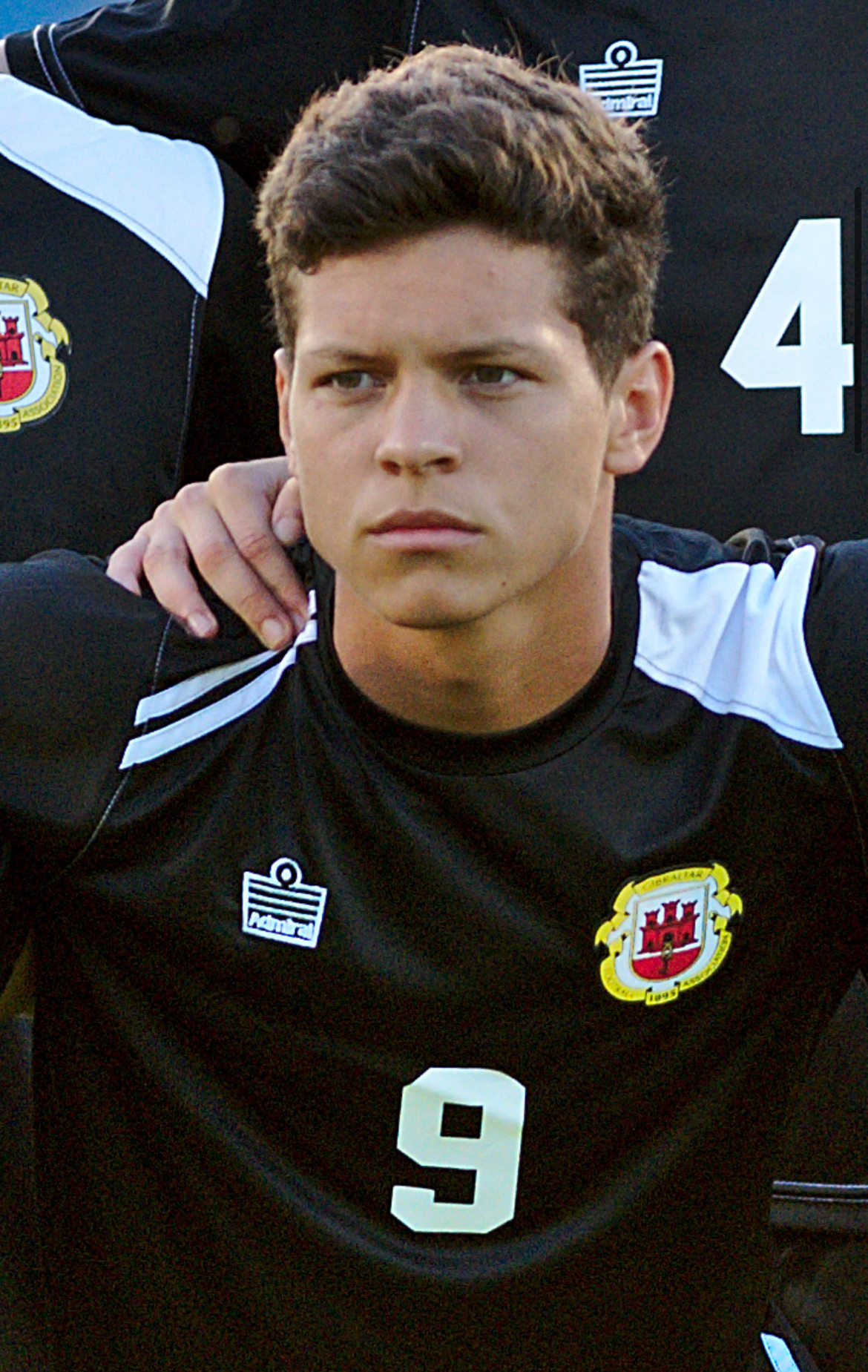
- De Barr with Gibraltar U21 in 2017

Personal information
- Full name: Andre Tjay De Barr
- Date of birth: 13 March 2000 (age 26)
- Place of birth: Gibraltar
- Height: 1.75 m (5 ft 9 in)
- Positions: Forward; winger

Team information
- Current team: OFK Beograd
- Number: 11

Youth career
- 2013–2016: Lincoln Red Imps

Senior career*
Years	Team	Apps	(Gls)
2015–2018	Lincoln Red Imps	14	(0)
2017	→ Europa Point (loan)	11	(0)
2018–2019	Europa	25	(14)
2019–2020	Real Oviedo B	4	(0)
2020–2021	Lincoln Red Imps	20	(3)
2021–2024	Wycombe Wanderers	33	(1)
2022	→ Eastleigh (loan)	4	(0)
2024–2026	Lincoln Red Imps	55	(24)
2026–	OFK Beograd	16	(1)

International career^{‡}
2015	Gibraltar U16		
2015	Gibraltar U17	3	(0)
2016	Gibraltar U19	2	(0)
2017–2020	Gibraltar U21	4	(0)
2018–	Gibraltar	64	(4)
- * Club domestic league appearances and goals as of 15:28, 21 November 2026 (UTC) ‡ National team caps and goals as of 16:16, 15 November 2026 (UTC)

Andre Tjay De Barr (born 13 March 2000) is a Gibraltarian professional footballer who plays for Serbian SuperLiga club OFK Beograd and captains the Gibraltar national football team as a forward.

== Club career ==
De Barr came through the youth system at Lincoln Red Imps, and in early 2015 had a trial at Peterborough United. In 2017 he went on loan to Europa Point to help the newly promoted team in their fight for survival during the 2016–17 season. He played 11 games but could not help the side as they finished bottom of the league. His performances, however, did impress Lincoln manager Julio César Ribas, who opted to use him more often the following season. De Barr won his first senior trophy that September after coming off the bench in the 2017 Pepe Reyes Cup, converting the winning penalty He scored his first senior goal for the Red Imps on 20 February 2018, in a Rock Cup Second Round game against Glacis United. On 29 May 2018 he announced that he would leave the club, signing for rivals Europa in July.

De Barr made his debut for Europa on 12 August 2018, in the 2018 Pepe Reyes Cup game against former club Lincoln Red Imps. He scored an own goal to take the game to penalties, which Europa won to give De Barr his first silverware for the side. After impressing for both his club and national team, in January 2019 it was reported that De Barr had been invited to a trial with an unnamed Portuguese Primeira Liga team, which was later revealed to be Rio Ave. On 19 February, it was revealed that he was on trial with Segunda División side UD Las Palmas. His performances in the latter months of 2018 saw him nominated for "Junior Individual of the Year" at the GBC Sports Awards 2018.

On 21 March 2019, it was revealed that De Barr signed for the 2019–20 season with Spanish club Real Oviedo, being initially assigned to their B-side. The news was confirmed by Europa FC on Twitter later that day. He made his debut as a substitute on 25 August, but was unable to prevent his team losing 4–3 on the opening day of the season against Peña Deportiva. However, his first season at the club was curtailed by a meniscus injury to his left leg in December 2019. With football disrupted due to the COVID-19 pandemic, De Barr returned to limited training on 27 May 2020 with Oviedo's B team. However, continued uncertainty over the return to football in Spain led to De Barr re-joining Lincoln Red Imps on 1 September 2020. Upon his return, he was utilised primarily as a winger with Kike Gómez the lone striker, but his performances attracted the attention of Wycombe Wanderers who invited him for a trial in July 2021.

He signed a one-year deal with Wycombe on 4 August 2021. On 24 August, he made his debut as a substitute against Stevenage in the EFL Cup, scoring a 94th minute equaliser to take the game into extra time before scoring the winning penalty to take the Chairboys through. His style of play and build earned him the nickname "Tevez" from the Wycombe squad.

On 11 February 2022, he joined Eastleigh on a 30 day loan. He made just four appearances for the Spitfires before picking up a serious injury before returning to his parent club.

On 29 December 2022 he came on as a second-half substitute, in place of Ali Al-Hamadi, for his fifth appearance of the season for Wycombe away to Plymouth Argyle at Home Park, but immediately following the full time whistle he collapsed to the ground and, following medical attention on the pitch, was taken to hospital where he was later released. He returned to the first team later in January, and scored his first league goal for the club on 11 March 2023 against Burton Albion

On 24 January 2024, De Barr returned to Gibraltarian club Lincoln Red Imps, subject to paperwork being completed. After two and a half seasons back with the Imps which saw the club have an historic UEFA Conference League campaign, he signed for Serbian side OFK Beograd in June 2026, for an undisclosed fee.

== International career ==
De Barr has represented Gibraltar internationally at youth groups from under-16 through to under-21 level. He made his senior debut on 25 March 2018, coming on as a late substitute against Latvia and winning the free kick that Liam Walker converted to give Gibraltar a famous 1–0 win. De Barr subsequently became a regular in the side during their UEFA Nations League campaign, scoring his first international goal on 16 November to break the deadlock against Armenia making him the youngest scorer in the tournament's history at 18 years & 248 days until September 2024, when James Scanlon broke the record. After scoring a penalty against Latvia on 1 September 2021, he became the joint-record scorer for Gibraltar alongside Lee Casciaro.

== Career statistics ==
=== Club ===
As of match played on 21 November 2026

Club statistics
Club	Season	League			National cup (Note: Includes Rock Cup, FA Cup)		League cup (Note: Includes EFL Cup)		Continental		Other		Total	
Club	Season	Division	Apps	Goals	Apps	Goals	Apps	Goals	Apps	Goals	Apps	Goals	Apps	Goals
Lincoln Red Imps	2016–17	Gibraltar Premier Division	1	0	0	0	—		0	0	0	0	1	0
Lincoln Red Imps	2017–18	Gibraltar Premier Division	13	0	2	1	—		0	0	1 (Note: Appearance in Pepe Reyes Cup)	0	16	1
Lincoln Red Imps	Total		14	0	2	1	—		0	0	1	0	17	1
Europa Point (loan)	2016–17	Gibraltar Premier Division	11	0	2	0	—		—		0	0	13	0
Europa	2018–19	Gibraltar Premier Division	25	14	3	7	—		0	0	1	0	29	21
Europa	2019–20	Gibraltar National League	0	0	0	0	—		4 (Note: Appearances in UEFA Europa League)	1	0	0	4	1
Europa	Total		25	14	3	7	—		4	1	1	0	33	22
Oviedo B	2019–20	Segunda División B	4	0	—		—		—		—		4	0
Lincoln Red Imps	2020–21	Gibraltar National League	20	3	3	0	—		1	0	0	0	24	3
Lincoln Red Imps	2021–22	Gibraltar National League	0	0	0	0	—		2 (Note: Appearances in UEFA Champions League)	2	0	0	2	2
Lincoln Red Imps	Total		20	3	3	0	—		3	2	0	0	26	5
Wycombe Wanderers	2021–22	League One	5	0	1	0	1	1	—		1 (Note: Appearance(s) in EFL Trophy)	0	8	1
Wycombe Wanderers	2022–23	League One	19	1	1	0	1	0	—		0	0	21	1
Wycombe Wanderers	2023–24	League One	9	0	2	0	2	0	—		2	0	15	0
Wycombe Wanderers	Total		33	1	4	0	4	1	—		3	0	44	2
Eastleigh (loan)	2021–22	National League	4	0	0	0	—		—		—		4	0
Lincoln Red Imps	2023–24	Gibraltar Football League	12	8	3	1	—		—		—		15	9
Lincoln Red Imps	2024–25	Gibraltar Football League	20	5	2	1	—		7 (Note: Three appearances in UEFA Champions League, two appearances and one goal in UEFA Europa League, two appearances in UEFA Conference League)	1	1	0	30	7
Lincoln Red Imps	2025–26	Gibraltar Football League	23	11	4	1	—		14 (Note: Four appearances and three goals in UEFA Champions League, four appearances and one goal in UEFA Europa League, six appearances and one goal in the UEFA Conference League)	5	1	1	42	18
Lincoln Red Imps	Total		55	24	9	3	—		21	6	2	1	87	34
OFK Beograd	2026–27	Serbian SuperLiga	16	1	1	0	—		—		0	0	17	1
Career total			181	43	24	11	4	1	28	9	7	1	245	65

=== International ===
As of match played 13 November 2026

Appearances and goals by national team and year
National team	Year	Apps	Goals
Gibraltar U17
Gibraltar U17	2015	3	0
Total		3	0
Gibraltar U19
Gibraltar U19	2016	2	0
Total		2	0
Gibraltar U21
Gibraltar U21	2017	2	0
Gibraltar U21	2018	1	0
Gibraltar U21	2019	0	0
Gibraltar U21	2020	1	0
Total		4	0
Gibraltar
Gibraltar	2018	6	1
Gibraltar	2019	10	0
Gibraltar	2020	4	1
Gibraltar	2021	8	1
Gibraltar	2022	2	0
Gibraltar	2023	8	0
Gibraltar	2024	10	0
Gibraltar	2025	8	0
Gibraltar	2026	8	1
Total		64	4

Gibraltar score listed first, score column indicates score after each De Barr goal.

International goals by date, venue, cap, opponent, score, result and competition
No.	Date	Venue	Cap	Opponent	Score	Result	Competition
1	16 November 2018	Victoria Stadium, Gibraltar	5	Armenia	1–0	2–6	2018–19 UEFA Nations League D
2	10 October 2020	Rheinpark Stadion, Vaduz, Liechtenstein	18	Liechtenstein	1–0	1–0	2020–21 UEFA Nations League D
3	1 September 2021	Daugava Stadium, Riga, Latvia	25	Latvia	1–1	1–3	2022 FIFA World Cup qualification
4	6 June 2026	Europa Point Stadium, Europa Point, Gibraltar	59	Cayman Islands	4–1	4–1	Friendly

== Honours ==
Lincoln Red Imps

- Gibraltar Premier Division/Gibraltar Football League: 2017–18, 2020–21, 2023–24, 2024–25, 2025–26
- Rock Cup: 2021, 2023–24, 2025–26
- Pepe Reyes Cup: 2017, 2025

Europa

- Pepe Reyes Cup: 2018
