= Kye Livingstone =

Gibraltarian footballer

Personal information
- Full name: Kye William Joseph Livingstone
- Date of birth: 9 March 2003 (age 23)
- Place of birth: Gibraltar
- Height: 5 ft 11 in (1.80 m)
- Position: Right midfielder

Team information
- Current team: Lions Gibraltar
- Number: 7

Youth career
- Glacis United
- College Europa
- 2014–2019: Lincoln Red Imps
- 2019–2021: Bruno's Magpies
- 2021–2024: Larne

Senior career*
Years	Team	Apps	(Gls)
2019–2021	Bruno's Magpies	12	(0)
2021–2024	Larne	0	(0)
2024–	Lions Gibraltar	51	(8)

International career^{‡}
2021	Gibraltar U19	1	(0)
2023–2024	Gibraltar U21	8	(0)
2025–	Gibraltar	1	(0)
- * Club domestic league appearances and goals as of 8 November 2026 ‡ National team caps and goals as of 25 March 2025

Kye William Joseph Livingstone (born 9 March 2003) is a Gibraltarian association footballer who plays as a right midfielder for Lions Gibraltar and the Gibraltar national football team.

== Club career ==
After spending most of his youth career with Lincoln Red Imps, Livingstone made his senior breakthrough in the 2019 with Bruno's Magpies. His performances attracted the attention of NIFL Premiership side Larne, who signed him to their youth system in 2021. In 2022, he was elevated to the senior team for the first time for a UEFA Conference League tie against St Joseph's, and signed his first professional deal in May 2023. However, he left the club at the end of the 2023–24 season without playing a senior game.

In summer 2024, he returned to Gibraltar to sign for Lions Gibraltar.

== International career ==
After previously representing Gibraltar at under-19 level in 2019, Livingstone established himself in the under-21s during the 2025 UEFA European Under-21 Championship qualification campaign, playing 8 times. He received his first call-up to the senior side under interim coach Scott Wiseman in March 2025. He made his debut on 25 March against Czechia.

== Career statistics ==
As of match played 8 November 2026

Appearances and goals by club, season and competition
Club	Season	League			National Cup		League Cup		Continental		Other		Total	
Club	Season	Division	Apps	Goals	Apps	Goals	Apps	Goals	Apps	Goals	Apps	Goals	Apps	Goals
Bruno's Magpies	2019–20	Gibraltar National League	5	0	0	0	—		—		—		5	0
Bruno's Magpies	2020–21	Gibraltar National League	7	0	0	0	—		—		—		7	0
Bruno's Magpies	Total		12	0	0	0	—		—		—		12	0
Larne	2021–22	NIFL Premiership	0	0	0	0	—		—		—		0	0
Larne	2022–23	NIFL Premiership	0	0	0	0	0	0	0	0	0	0	0	0
Larne	2023–24	NIFL Premiership	0	0	0	0	0	0	0	0	0	0	0	0
Larne	Total		0	0	0	0	0	0	0	0	0	0	0	0
Lions Gibraltar	2024–25	Gibraltar Football League	24	5	3	0	—		—		—		27	5
Lions Gibraltar	2025–26	Gibraltar Football League	19	0	3	1	—		—		—		22	1
Lions Gibraltar	2026–27	8	3	0	0	—		—		—		8	3	
Lions Gibraltar	Total		51	8	6	1	0	0	0	0	0	0	57	9
Career total			63	8	6	1	0	0	0	0	0	0	69	9

=== International ===
As of 25 March 2025

Gibraltar
Year	Apps	Goals
2025	1	0
Total	1	0
