= Ethan Jolley =

Professional Gibraltarian footballer

Personal information
- Full name: Ethan Terence Jolley
- Date of birth: 29 March 1997 (age 29)
- Place of birth: Gibraltar
- Position: Defender

Team information
- Current team: Lincoln Red Imps
- Number: 2

Youth career
- Atlético Zabal

Senior career*
Years	Team	Apps	(Gls)
2013–2015	College Europa	16	(0)
2015–2016	Lincoln Red Imps	7	(0)
2015–2016	→ Lynx (loan)	21	(0)
2016–2017	Mons Calpe	24	(0)
2017–2023	Europa	104	(0)
2023–2026	St Joseph's	53	(0)
2026–	Lincoln Red Imps	7	(0)

International career^{‡}
2013	Gibraltar U17	3	(0)
2014–2015	Gibraltar U19	6	(0)
2017–2018	Gibraltar U21	6	(0)
2019–	Gibraltar	49	(0)
- * Club domestic league appearances and goals as of 8 November 2026 ‡ National team caps and goals as of 15 November 2026 (UTC)

Ethan Terence Jolley (born 29 March 1997) is a professional Gibraltarian footballer who plays as a defender for Lincoln Red Imps and the Gibraltar national team. He is the cousin of fellow national team footballer Tjay De Barr.

== Career ==
Jolley made his international debut for Gibraltar on 26 March 2019, coming on as a substitute for Tjay De Barr in second-half stoppage time of the friendly match against Estonia, which finished as a 0–1 home loss.

On 7 July 2023, Jolley signed a contract with St Joseph's.

== Career statistics ==
=== International ===
As of match played 13 November 2026

Gibraltar
Year	Apps	Goals
2019	4	0
2020	4	0
2021	4	0
2022	8	0
2023	8	0
2024	7	0
2025	6	0
2026	8	0
Total	49	0

== Honours ==
St Joseph's

- Pepe Reyes Cup: 2024

== Personal life ==
Ethan Jolley's cousin is fellow international Tjay De Barr and his father is the former player and current F.C. Bruno's Magpies's coach Terrence Jolley. Outside of football, he works as a shipping agent.
