= 2025–26 Peninsula Rock Cup =

Football tournament season in Gibraltar

2025–26 Rock Cup
Tournament details
- Country: Gibraltar
- Dates: 31 January – 14 March 2026
- Teams: 12

Final positions
- Champions: Lincoln Red Imps (21st title)
- Runners-up: Mons Calpe

Tournament statistics
- Matches played: 11
- Goals scored: 25 (2.27 per match)
- Top goal scorer(s): (England) Mikael Ndjoli (Philippines) Gómez (5 goals)

The 2025–26 Rock Cup is a single-leg knockout football tournament contested by clubs from Gibraltar. As part of a new sponsorship agreement, the tournament will be known as the Peninsula Rock Cup from this season.

== First round ==
31 January 2026	Lynx	1–0	Europa	Europa Point, Gibraltar
16:30	Cabeza 48'			Stadium: Europa Point Stadium; Referee: José Antonio Diaz

31 January 2026	Manchester 62	0–4	Lions Gibraltar	Europa Point, Gibraltar
19:30			Marques Silva 16'; Rebagliati 35'; Livingstone 45+3'; Ndjoli 51'	Stadium: Europa Point Stadium; Referee: Denis Perez

1 February 2026	St Joseph's	0–1	Lincoln Red Imps	Europa Point, Gibraltar
16:30			García 25'	Stadium: Europa Point Stadium; Referee: Seth Galia

1 February 2026	Hound Dogs	0–0 (4–3 p)	FC Magpies	Europa Point, Gibraltar
19:30				Stadium: Europa Point Stadium; Referee: José Delgado
	Penalties
	Diallo (penalty missed); M. Gashi (penalty scored); Luglio (penalty missed); A. Gashi (penalty scored); Dafallah (penalty scored); Al-Shubasi (penalty scored)		(penalty missed) Villar; (penalty missed) Clinton; (penalty scored) Méndez; (penalty scored) Stevens; (penalty scored) Peacock; (penalty missed) Chipolina

== Quarter finals ==
14 February 2026	College 1975	0–2	Glacis United	Europa Point, Gibraltar
16:30			Carty 51'; Brinkman 86'	Stadium: Europa Point Stadium; Referee: Israel Fosela

14 February 2026	Lions Gibraltar	4–0	Europa Point	Europa Point, Gibraltar
19:30	Ndjoli 14', 54', 73'; Rebagliati 40'			Stadium: Europa Point Stadium; Referee: José Antonio Diaz

15 February 2026	Mons Calpe	1–0	Lynx	Europa Point, Gibraltar
16:30	Cheito 56'			Stadium: Europa Point Stadium; Referee: Seth Galia

15 February 2026	Hound Dogs	0–2	Lincoln Red Imps	Europa Point, Gibraltar
19:30			El Ghobashy 46'; Gómez 69'	Stadium: Europa Point Stadium; Referee: Jason Barcelo

== Semi-Finals ==
28 February 2026	Glacis United	0–2	Mons Calpe	Europa Point, Gibraltar
16:30			Mason 70'; Toledano 79'	Stadium: Europa Point Stadium; Referee: Seth Galia

1 March 2026	Lincoln Red Imps	2–1	Lions Gibraltar	Europa Point, Gibraltar
19:30	García 23'; Gómez 30'		Ndjoli 5'	Stadium: Europa Point Stadium; Referee: José Antonio Díaz

== Finals ==
14 March 2026	Mons Calpe	0–5	Lincoln Red Imps	Europa Point, Gibraltar
17:00 CET (UTC+1)			Gómez 7', 25', 62'; Tjay De Barr 57'; Flahi Idrissi 88'	Stadium: Europa Point Stadium; Referee: José Delgado

== Scorers ==
5 goals

- (Philippines) Kike Gómez (Lincoln Red Imps)
- (England) Mikael Ndjoli (Lions Gibraltar)

2 goals

- (Spain) Toni García (Lincoln Red Imps)
- (Argentina) Lucas Rebagliati (Lions Gibraltar)

1 goal

- (Gibraltar) Julian Brinkman (Glacis United)
- (Republic of Ireland) David Carty (Glacis United)
- (Gibraltar) Tjay De Barr (Lincoln Red Imps)
- (Spain) Yussef Flahi Idrissi (Lincoln Red Imps)
- (Egypt) Ayman El Ghobashy (Lincoln Red Imps)
- Kye Livingstone (Lions Gibraltar)
- (England) Raynner Marques Silva (Lions Gibraltar)
- (Spain) Denis Cabeza (Lynx)
- (Spain) Cheito (Mons Calpe)
- (Gibraltar) Leon Mason (Mons Calpe)
- (Spain) Manu Toledano (Mons Calpe)
