= Leon Mason =

Gibraltarian footballer

Personal information
- Full name: Leon Lewis Mason
- Date of birth: 16 May 2007 (age 19)
- Place of birth: Gibraltar
- Height: 1.82 m (6 ft 0 in)
- Position: Forward

Team information
- Current team: Lincoln Red Imps
- Number: 16

Youth career
- 2018–2020: Manchester 62
- 2020–2023: Linense
- 2023–2024: Cádiz
- 2024: FC Magpies
- 2024–2025: Linense

Senior career*
Years	Team	Apps	(Gls)
2025	Linense B	3	(0)
2025–2026	Mons Calpe	23	(4)
2026–	Lincoln Red Imps	7	(1)

International career^{‡}
2022	Gibraltar U15	1	(1)
2022	Gibraltar U16	2	(1)
2022–2024	Gibraltar U17	5	(0)
2024	Gibraltar U19	3	(0)
2024–	Gibraltar U21	11	(0)
2026–	Gibraltar	7	(1)
- * Club domestic league appearances and goals as of 22 November 2026 ‡ National team caps and goals as of 18 November 2026

Leon Lewis Mason (born 16 May 2007) is a Gibraltarian association footballer who plays as a forward for Lincoln Red Imps and the Gibraltar national football team.

== Club career ==
After playing through the youth ranks at Manchester 62, Real Balompédica Linense, Cádiz and FC Magpies, Mason made his senior football debut for Linense B on 2 March 2025 in a 0–1 Primera Andaluza defeat to Barbate. He returned to Gibraltar that summer to join Mons Calpe. After one season, he moved to reignign champions Lincoln Red Imps.

== International career ==
Mason made his senior debut for Gibraltar on 3 June 2026, scoring in a 4–0 win over British Virgin Islands in a friendly.

== Career statistics ==
As of match played 2 November 2026

Appearances and goals by club, season and competition
Club	Season	League			National Cup		League Cup		Continental		Other		Total	
Club	Season	Division	Apps	Goals	Apps	Goals	Apps	Goals	Apps	Goals	Apps	Goals	Apps	Goals
Real Balompédica Linense B	2024–25	Primera Andaluza	3	0	—		—		—		—		3	0
Mons Calpe	2025–26	Gibraltar Football League	23	4	3	1	—		—		—		26	5
Lincoln Red Imps	2026–27	Gibraltar Football League	7	1	0	0	—		2	0	1	0	10	1
Career total			33	5	3	1	0	0	2	0	1	0	39	6

=== International ===
As of 16 November 2026

Gibraltar
Year	Apps	Goals
2026	7	1
Total	7	1

International goals

No.	Date	Venue	Opponent	Score	Result	Competition
1.	3 June 2026	Europa Point Stadium, Gibraltar	British Virgin Islands	3–0	4–0	Friendly
