= Juanje =

Spanish footballer

Personal information
- Full name: Juan Jesús Argüez Ruiz
- Date of birth: 4 April 1995 (age 31)
- Place of birth: La Línea, Spain
- Height: 1.67 m (5 ft 5 1/2 in)
- Position: Midfielder

Team information
- Current team: Mons Calpe
- Number: 20

Youth career
- Atlético Zabal
- 2007–2014: Sevilla

Senior career*
Years	Team	Apps	(Gls)
2014–2018	Sevilla B	73	(8)
2018–2019	Deportivo B	20	(1)
2019–2020	Cádiz B	0	(0)
2019–2020	→ El Ejido (loan)	28	(5)
2020–2021	El Ejido	24	(2)
2021–2022	Eldense	2	(0)
2022	Pulpileño	16	(1)
2022–2023	El Ejido	34	(2)
2023–2025	FCB Magpies	45	(9)
2025–2026	Lincoln Red Imps	25	(2)
2026–	Mons Calpe	9	(2)

International career
2011–2012	Spain U17	7	(1)
- * Club domestic league appearances and goals as of 22:17, 20 November 2026 (UTC)

Juan Jesús Argüez Ruiz (born 4 April 1995), commonly known as Juanje, is a Spanish footballer who plays for Gibraltarian club Mons Calpe as a winger.

== Club career ==
Born in La Línea de la Concepción, Cádiz, Andalusia, Juanje joined Sevilla FC's youth setup in 2007, after starting it out at Atlético Zabal Linense. He made his debut for the former's reserves on 22 February 2014, coming on as a second-half substitute in a 0–1 home loss against Real Balompédica Linense.

Juanje scored his first goal as a senior on 9 March 2014, netting the winner in a 2–1 home success over Granada CF B. On 4 May, he scored a brace in a 3–1 win at Écija Balompié.

On 6 May 2016, Juanje renewed his contract until 2018. He finished the campaign with 34 appearances and three goals, as his side achieved promotion to Segunda División.

Juanje made his professional debut on 21 September 2016, coming on as a late substitute for Bernardo in a 0–1 away loss against Levante UD. He featured rarely in the following years, suffering relegation in 2018.

On 31 August 2018, Juanje signed a one-year contract with another reserve team, Deportivo Fabril in the third division.
