= Christian Rutjens =

Spanish footballer (born 1998)

Personal information
- Full name: Christian Rutjens Oliva
- Date of birth: 5 January 1998 (age 28)
- Place of birth: Marbella, Spain
- Height: 1.85 m (6 ft 1 in)
- Position: Defender

Team information
- Current team: Lincoln Red Imps
- Number: 3

Youth career
- –2015: Alcobendas
- 2015–2016: Rayo Vallecano
- 2016–2018: Benevento

Senior career*
Years	Team	Apps	(Gls)
2017–2019	Benevento	1	(0)
2018	→ Recanatese (loan)	16	(0)
2019	Cesena	14	(1)
2019–2020	Recanatese	14	(2)
2020–2021	Torres	25	(0)
2021–2023	Floriana	31	(2)
2023	Foggia	11	(1)
2023	Chindia Târgoviște	1	(0)
2024	Ħamrun Spartans	10	(0)
2024–2025	Europa	17	(1)
2025–	Lincoln Red Imps	26	(1)
- * Club domestic league appearances and goals as of 02:00, 22 November 2026 (UTC)

Christian Rutjens Oliva (born 5 January 1998) is a Spanish professional footballer who plays as a defender for Gibraltarian club Lincoln Red Imps.

== Career ==
In 2016, Rutjens signed for Italian Serie A side Benevento, where he made one league appearance. On 20 May 2018, he debuted for Benevento in a 1–0 loss to Chievo. Before the second half of 2018–19, Rutjens signed for Cesena in the Italian fourth division. In 2021, he signed for Maltese club Floriana.

On 6 January 2023, Rutjens returned to Italy and signed with Foggia until the end of the season, with an option to renew.

On 24 October 2025, Rutjens helped Lincoln Red Imps win their first UEFA Conference League game, scoring a header in the 87th minute against Lech Poznań, making it 2–1 for his team.

== Honours ==
Floriana

- Maltese FA Trophy: 2021–22
- Maltese Super Cup runner-up: 2022

Lincoln Red Imps

- Rock Cup: 2025–26
