= Jean-Carlos Garcia =

Gibraltarian footballer

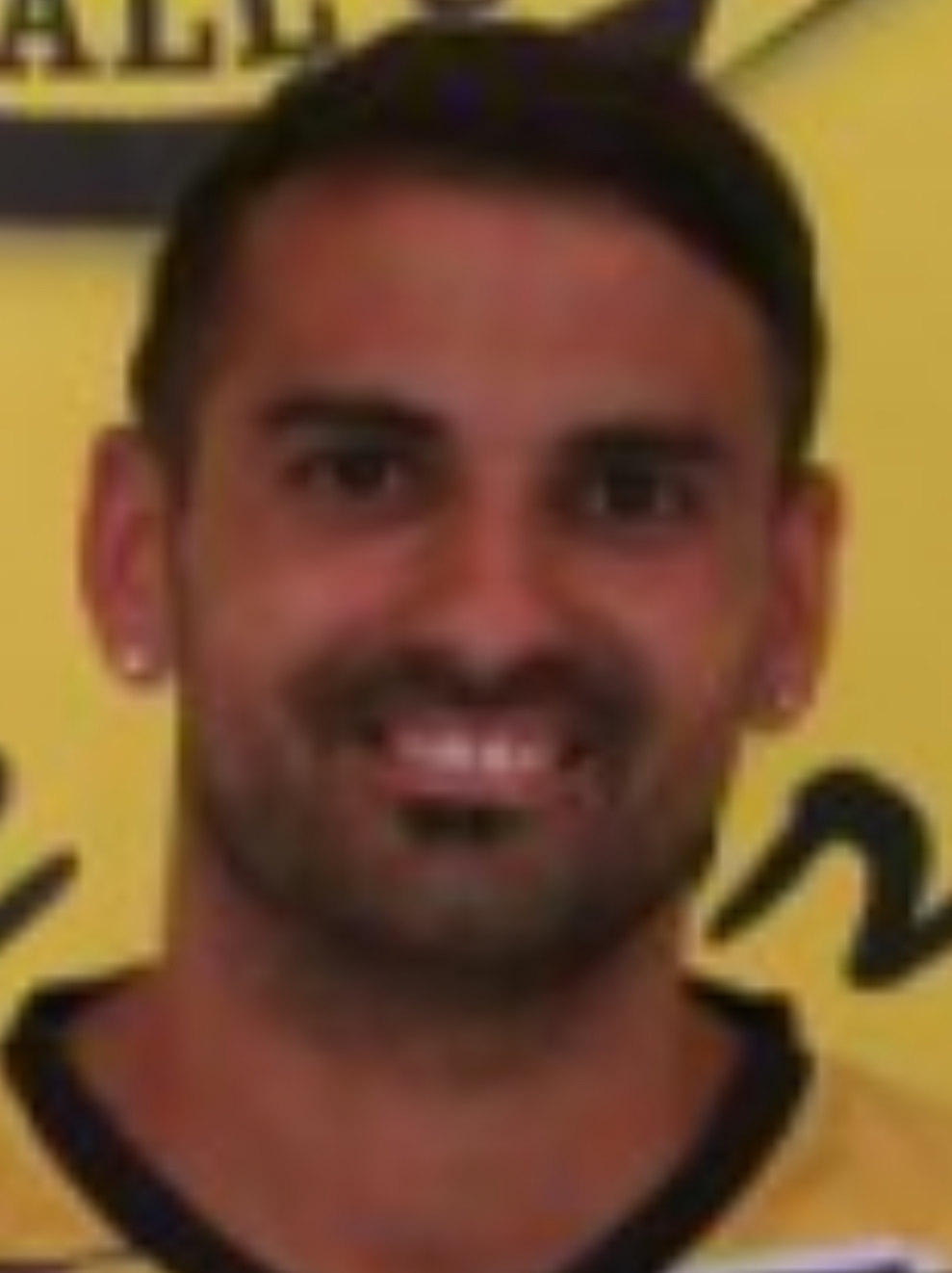

Personal information
- Full name: Jean-Carlos Anthony Garcia
- Date of birth: 5 July 1992 (age 34)
- Place of birth: Gibraltar
- Position: Right back

Team information
- Current team: College 1975
- Number: 37

Youth career
- Linense

Senior career*
| Years | Team | Apps | (Gls) |
| 2007–2011 | Atlético Zabal | | |
| 2011–2012 | Balona Balompié | 2 | (0) |
| 2013–2019 | Lincoln Red Imps | 100 | (14) |
| 2019 | → Gibraltar Phoenix (loan) | 15 | (2) |
| 2019 | Gibraltar United | 0 | (0) |
| 2019–2021 | Bruno's Magpies | 32 | (1) |
| 2021–2022 | Glacis United | 18 | (0) |
| 2022–2025 | Lynx | 58 | (0) |
| 2025–2026 | Mons Calpe | 11 | (0) |
| 2026– | College 1975 | 7 | (0) |

International career^{‡}
| 2014–2018 | Gibraltar | 26 | (0) |
- * Club domestic league appearances and goals as of 21 November 2026 ‡ National team caps and goals as of 6 September 2018

Jean-Carlos Anthony Garcia (born 5 July 1992) is a Gibraltarian footballer who plays for Gibraltar Football League side College 1975, and the Gibraltar national team. Mainly a right back, he can also play as a right winger.

== International career ==
Garcia was first called up to the Gibraltar senior team in May 2014 for friendlies against Estonia and Malta. He made his international début with Gibraltar on 26 May 2014 in a 1–1 draw with Estonia, coming on as a 67th-minute substitute for David Artell. His second appearance came in a 1–0 home win against Malta on 4 June 2014.

=== International statistics ===
As of 23 March 2019.

| National team | Season | Apps | Goals |
|---|---|---|---|
| Gibraltar | 2014 | 4 | 0 |
| Gibraltar | 2015 | 7 | 0 |
| Gibraltar | 2016 | 7 | 0 |
| Gibraltar | 2017 | 6 | 0 |
| Gibraltar | 2018 | 2 | 0 |
| Total | | 26 | 0 |
