= Mikael Ndjoli =

English footballer (born 1997)

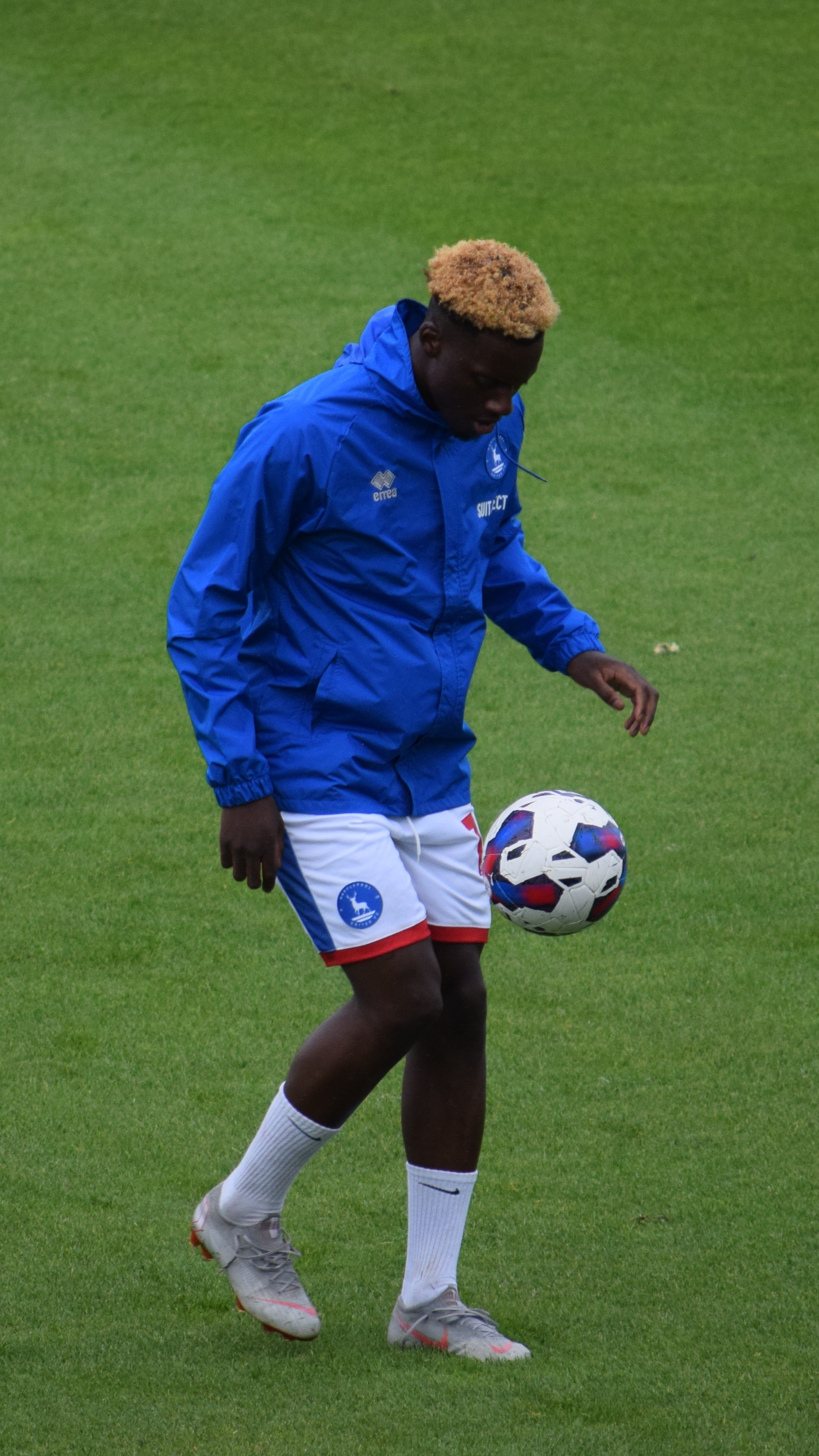
- Ndjoli warming up for Hartlepool United in 2022

Personal information
- Full name: Mikael Bongili Ndjoli
- Date of birth: 8 October 1997 (age 29)
- Place of birth: London, England
- Height: 1.83 m (6 ft 0 in)
- Positions: Forward; winger

Team information
- Current team: Lions Gibraltar
- Number: 9

Youth career
- Tottenham Hotspur
- Watford
- –2014: Brentford
- 2014–2016: Millwall
- 2016–2018: Bournemouth

Senior career*
Years	Team	Apps	(Gls)
2018–2021	Bournemouth	0	(0)
2018–2019	→ Kilmarnock (loan)	24	(2)
2019–2020	→ Gillingham (loan)	12	(2)
2020	→ Motherwell (loan)	1	(0)
2021	Barrow	2	(0)
2021–2022	Aldershot Town	23	(6)
2022	Virginia Beach City FC	5	(4)
2022–2024	Hartlepool United	8	(0)
2023	→ Radcliffe (loan)	6	(1)
2023–2024	→ Blyth Spartans (loan)	11	(2)
2024	→ Spennymoor Town (loan)	6	(2)
2024–	Lions Gibraltar	55	(26)
- * Club domestic league appearances and goals as of 20:06, 31 October 2026 (UTC)

Mikael Bongili Ndjoli (born 8 October 1997) is an English professional footballer who plays as a forward for Gibraltar League club Lions Gibraltar.

Ndjoli is a product of the Millwall and Brentford academies and signed his first professional contract with Bournemouth in 2016. He failed to make a first team appearance for the club, but gained experience on loan at EFL club Gillingham and Scottish Premiership clubs Kilmarnock and Motherwell. Following his departure from Bournemouth in 2021, Ndjoli played a three-year spell in non-League football, bisected by a short period with American lower-league club Virginia Beach City FC. In 2024, Ndjoli transferred to Lions Gibraltar.

== Career ==
=== Youth years ===
A forward, Ndjoli began his career with spells at Tottenham Hotspur and Watford, before entering the academy at Brentford. He was a part of the U15 team which won the Junior category at the 2012 Milk Cup. He moved on to join the academy at Millwall and embarked on a two-year scholarship in 2014. Despite scoring 20 goals in 24 matches for the U18 team and breaking into the U21 team during the 2015–16 season, Ndjoli departed the club in June 2016, after failing to be awarded a professional contract.

=== Bournemouth ===
In July 2016, Ndjoli signed his first professional contract to join the U21 team at Premier League club Bournemouth on an initial one-year deal and he was a part of the team which reached the 2017 Hampshire Senior Cup Final. Ndjoli progressed sufficiently during the 2017–18 season to win his only first team call-up for a FA Cup fourth round match versus Wigan Athletic on 18 January 2018 and he remained an unused substitute during the 3–0 defeat. After finishing the 2017–18 season with 30 goals for the U21 team, it was announced in May 2018 that Ndjoli had signed a new one-year contract.

On 4 July 2018, Ndjoli joined Scottish Premiership club Kilmarnock on a half-season loan, which was later extended until the end of the 2018–19 season. He made 31 appearances and scored five goals during the season, with four of the goals coming in a four-game spell in late-July and early-August 2018.

After signing a new two-year contract at the end of the 2018–19 season, Ndjoli spent much of the COVID-19-affected 2019–20 season away on loan at League One club Gillingham and Scottish Premiership club Motherwell. He made 20 appearances and scored three goals across both spells.

Despite Bournemouth's relegation to the Championship at the end of the 2019–20 season, Ndjoli did not win a call into a first-team squad during the first half of the 2020–21 season. On 1 February 2021, he agreed a mutual termination of his contract and he departed Dean Court.

=== Barrow ===
On 1 February 2021, Ndjoli joined League Two club Barrow on a free transfer and signed a contract until the end of the 2020–21 season. He made two substitute appearances before dropping out of the squad in late March and was released when his contract expired.

=== Aldershot Town ===
On 5 October 2021, Ndjoli signed a contract with National League club Aldershot Town on a free transfer. He ended the 2021–22 season with 23 appearances and a career-high six goals. Ndjoli was offered a new contract in May 2022, but elected to depart the club.

=== Virginia Beach City FC ===
In June 2022, Ndjoli moved to the United States, to transfer to National Premier Soccer League club Virginia Beach City FC. He scored four goals in six appearances, before departing the club in mid-July 2022.

=== Hartlepool United ===
On 22 July 2022, Ndjoli returned to England to sign a two-year contract with League Two club Hartlepool United. He made 10 appearances during the first two months of the 2022–23 season and scored twice in a 2–0 EFL Trophy group stage win over Harrogate Town on 30 August 2022. Following just one further appearance in January 2023, Ndjoli played the final month of the season on loan at Northern Premier League Premier Division club Radcliffe. He scored one goal in six appearances during his spell and was a part of the club's 2022–23 Manchester Premier Cup-winning squad.

Following Hartlepool's relegation to the National League at the end of the 2022–23 season, manager John Askey reported that he did not see Ndjoli as part of his plans for the 2023–24 season. He was not allocated a squad number and spent much of the season on loan at National League North clubs Blyth Spartans and Spennymoor Town. Ndjoli was released at the end of the 2023–24 season, when his contract expired.

=== Lions Gibraltar ===
In July 2024, Ndjoli signed a contract with Gibraltar League club Lions Gibraltar on a free transfer. He made 25 appearances and scored six goals during the 2024–25 season.

== Personal life ==
Born in England, Ndjoli is of Congolese descent.

== Career statistics ==
As of match played 31 October 2026

Appearances and goals by club, season and competition
Club	Season	League			National cup (Note: Includes FA Cup, Scottish Cup, Rock Cup)		League cup (Note: Includes EFL Cup, Scottish League Cup)		Other		Total	
Club	Season	Division	Apps	Goals	Apps	Goals	Apps	Goals	Apps	Goals	Apps	Goals
Bournemouth	2017–18	Premier League	0	0	0	0	0	0	—		0	0
Kilmarnock (loan)	2018–19	Scottish Premiership	24	2	2	0	5	3	―		31	5
Gillingham (loan)	2019–20	League One	12	2	3	0	1	1	2 (Note: Appearances in EFL Trophy)	0	18	3
Motherwell (loan)	2019–20	Scottish Premiership	1	0	1	0	―		―		2	0
Barrow	2020–21	League Two	2	0	―		―		―		2	0
Aldershot Town	2021–22	National League	23	6	1	0	―		2 (Note: Appearances in FA Trophy)	0	26	6
Virginia Beach City FC	2022	National Premier Soccer League	5	4	―		―		―		5	4
Hartlepool United	2022–23	League Two	8	0	0	0	0	0	3	2	11	2
Radcliffe (loan)	2022–23	Northern Premier League Premier Division	6	1	―		―		0	0	6	1
Blyth Spartans (loan)	2023–24	National League North	11	2	―		―		2	1	13	3
Spennymoor Town (loan)	2023–24	National League North	6	2	―		―		―		6	2
Lions Gibraltar	2024–25	Gibraltar Football League	22	6	3	0	―		―		25	6
Lions Gibraltar	2025–26	Gibraltar Football League	27	20	3	5	—		—		30	25
Lions Gibraltar	2025–26	6	0	0	0	—		—		6	0	
Lions Gibraltar	Total		55	26	6	5	—		—		61	31
Career total			153	45	13	5	6	4	9	3	181	57

== Honours ==
Radcliffe

- Manchester Premier Cup: 2022–23
