= Juanjo Bezares =

Spanish footballer

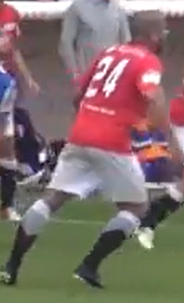
- Bezares playing for Gimnàstic in 2013

Personal information
- Full name: Juan José Bezares Alarcón
- Date of birth: 17 May 1981 (age 45)
- Place of birth: Guadiaro, Spain
- Height: 1.75 m (5 ft 9 in)
- Position: Midfielder

Youth career
- Guadiaro

Senior career*
Years	Team	Apps	(Gls)
2000–2002	Linense	47	(1)
2002–2004	Sevilla B	64	(1)
2004	Sevilla	1	(0)
2004–2009	Cádiz	134	(0)
2009	→ OFI (loan)	12	(0)
2009	→ Estepona (loan)	13	(0)
2010	AEP	13	(1)
2011	Aktobe	6	(0)
2012	Villanovense	14	(2)
2012–2013	Gimnàstic	32	(0)
2013–2014	Arroyo	12	(1)
2014	Eldense	15	(1)
2014–2015	San Pedro	28	(1)
2015	Europa		
2016	Guadiaro		

Managerial career
- 2025: Lincoln Red Imps (interim)
- 2025–2026: Lincoln Red Imps
- * Club domestic league appearances and goals

Juan José "Juanjo" Bezares Alarcón (born 17 May 1981) is a Spanish former footballer who played as a defensive midfielder. He was most recently the manager of Gibraltar Football League club Lincoln Red Imps.

== Football career ==
Born in Guadiaro, Province of Cádiz, Bezares started his career with Real Balompédica Linense, playing his first four seasons as a senior in Segunda División B, where he also represented Sevilla FC's reserves. On 1 February 2004, with the latter, he made his first-team – and La Liga – debut, fracturing his nose in a 0–1 away loss against Deportivo de La Coruña.

In the 2004 summer, Bezares joined Cádiz CF in Segunda División, being promoted in his first season but suffering relegation in his second. In the 2007–08 campaign he again dropped down a level, but contributed with 15 matches to the 2009 promotion (only one start, however, in 232 minutes of action).

Bezares moved abroad in January 2009, being loaned to Super League Greece club OFI. In August, he signed with Unión Estepona CF in the same situation but, in January 2010, he terminated his contract and joined AEP Paphos FC in the Cypriot First Division; one year later he changed teams and countries again, signing with FC Aktobe in Kazakhstan.

In January 2012, Bezares returned to Spain and joined Segunda B club CF Villanovense. On 21 July, after undergoing a successful trial, he signed with another third-tier side, Gimnàstic de Tarragona, leaving on 29 June of the following year after an agreement with the club for the extension of his contract was not reached.
