= Nauzet Santana =

Spanish footballer

Personal information
- Full name: Nauzet Santana García
- Date of birth: 8 April 1994 (age 32)
- Place of birth: Santa Cruz de Tenerife, Spain
- Height: 1.84 m (6 ft 1/2 in)
- Position: Goalkeeper

Team information
- Current team: Lincoln Red Imps
- Number: 1

Senior career*
Years	Team	Apps	(Gls)
2013–2015	Tenerife	0	(0)
2015–2016	→ Pobla de Mafumet (loan)	9	(0)
2016–2017	Fuenlabrada	2	(0)
2017	Granada B	0	(0)
2017–2018	Rayo Cantabria	0	(0)
2018	Real Ávila	7	(0)
2018–2020	Chennai City	16	(0)
2020–2021	Tamaraceite	23	(0)
2021–2022	Mensajero	29	(0)
2022–	Lincoln Red Imps	53	(0)
- * Club domestic league appearances and goals as of 19:12, 22 November 2026 (UTC)

Nauzet Santana García (born 8 April 1994) is a Spanish footballer who plays for Gibraltarian club Lincoln Red Imps as a goalkeeper.

== Career statistics ==
=== Club ===
As of 5 December 2018.

Nauzet Santana García has played for teams like Real Ávila, Granada II, Fuenlabrada, Pobla Mafumet, Tenerife.

Club	Season	League			Cup		Continental		Other		Total	
Club	Season	Division	Apps	Goals	Apps	Goals	Apps	Goals	Apps	Goals	Apps	Goals
Tenerife	2012–13	Segunda División B	0	0	0	0	–		0	0	0	0
Tenerife	2013–14	Segunda División	0	0	0	0	–		0	0	0	0
Tenerife	2014–15	Segunda División	0	0	0	0	–		0	0	0	0
Tenerife	2015–16	Segunda División	0	0	0	0	–		0	0	0	0
Tenerife	Total		0	0	0	0	0	0	0	0	0	0
Pobla de Mafumet (loan)	2015–16	Segunda División B	9	0	0	0	–		0	0	9	0
Fuenlabrada	2016–17	Segunda División B	2	0	0	0	–		0	0	2	0
Granada B	2017–18	Segunda División B	0	0	0	0	–		0	0	0	0
Chennai City	2018–19	I-League	10	0	0	0	–		0	0	10	0
Career total			21	0	0	0	0	0	0	0	21	0

== Honours ==
=== Club ===
Chennai City FC

- I-League: 2018–19
