= Ayman El Ghobashy =

Egyptian footballer (born 1996)

Personal information
- Date of birth: 7 February 1996 (age 30)
- Place of birth: Egypt
- Position: Forward

Team information
- Current team: Lincoln Red Imps
- Number: 99

Youth career
- –2009: Gomhoriat Shebin
- 2009–: Nogoom

Senior career*
Years	Team	Apps	(Gls)
–2021	Nogoom		
2017–2018	→ Gibraltar United (loan)	22	(11)
2019–2020	→ Al Ittihad (Alexandria) (loan)	11	(0)
2022	Eastern Company	3	(0)
2022–2023	Al Nasr		
2023–2024	Fursan Hispania		
2024–2025	Manchester 62	2	(2)
2025–	Lincoln Red Imps	15	(6)
- * Club domestic league appearances and goals as of 13 September 2026

Ayman El Ghobashy (Arabic: أيمن الغباشي; born 7 February 1996) is an Egyptian footballer who plays as a forward for Lincoln Red Imps.

== Career ==
El Ghobashy began his career in the youth ranks of Gomhoriat Shebin before joining Nogoom at the age of 13. While playing for Nogoom's youth teams, he was discovered by former Spain international Michel Salgado and attracted interest from Al Ahly, for whom he trained before Nogoom rejected a transfer. He later began his professional career with Nogoom in the Egyptian second tier. In 2016, El Ghobashy won the football reality television show The Victorious and subsequently trained with Portuguese top flight side Benfica. In 2017, El Ghobashy was sent on loan to Gibraltarian club Gibraltar United, where he was paid with cryptocurrency.

In 2019, El Ghobashy was sent on loan to Al Ittihad (Alexandria) in Egypt, where he made 11 appearances and scored no goals. On 23 September 2019, he debuted for the club during a 0–1 loss to Zamalek.

In 2022, El Ghobashy joined Egyptian Premier League side Eastern Company, where he made 3 appearances. Later that year, he moved to Al Nasr in Egypt before joining Emirati club Fursan Hispania in 2023.

In 2024, El Ghobashy moved to Gibraltarian club Manchester 62, where he made 2 appearances and scored 2 goals. He joined Lincoln Red Imps in 2025 and helped the club win the Gibraltar Football League during the 2025–26 season. He also appeared in the UEFA Conference League for Lincoln that season.
