= Bernardo Lopes =

Gibraltarian footballer (born 1993)

Personal information
- Full name: Bernardo Morgado Gaspar Lopes
- Date of birth: 30 July 1993 (age 33)
- Place of birth: Cascais, Portugal
- Height: 1.87 m (6 ft 1 1/2 in)
- Position: Centre back

Team information
- Current team: Lincoln Red Imps
- Number: 6

Youth career
- 2002–2004: União Tires
- 2004–2005: Agualva
- 2005−2006: União Tires
- 2006−2010: Estoril
- 2010−2012: Benfica

Senior career*
| Years | Team | Apps | (Gls) |
| 2012–2014 | Louletano | 50 | (10) |
| 2014−2015 | Marítimo B | 23 | (0) |
| 2015− | Lincoln Red Imps | 220 | (35) |

International career^{‡}
| 2022– | Gibraltar | 45 | (1) |
- * Club domestic league appearances and goals as of 22 November 2026 ‡ National team caps and goals as of 18 November 2026

Bernardo Morgado Gaspar Lopes (born 30 July 1993) is a professional footballer who plays as a central defender for and captains Gibraltar Football League club Lincoln Red Imps. Born in Portugal, he represents Gibraltar at international level.

== International career ==
After spending 6 years playing in Gibraltar, he became a British Overseas Territory citizen and naturalised for Gibraltar in time to be called up for friendlies against Grenada and the Faroe Islands in March 2022.

== Career statistics ==
=== International ===
As of match played 16 November 2026

Gibraltar
| Year | Apps | Goals |
| 2022 | 10 | 0 |
| 2023 | 5 | 0 |
| 2024 | 10 | 0 |
| 2025 | 10 | 0 |
| 2026 | 10 | 1 |
| Total | 45 | 1 |

International goals

Scores and results list Gibraltar's goal tally first.

List of international goals scored by Bernando Lopes
| No. | Date | Venue | Opponent | Score | Result | Competition |
|---|---|---|---|---|---|---|
| 1 | 5 October 2026 | Rheinpark Stadion, Vaduz, Liechtenstein | Liechtenstein | 1–0 | 2–0 | Friendly |
