= Toni García (footballer, born 1991) =

Spanish footballer

Personal information
- Full name: Antonio García Montero
- Date of birth: 7 August 1991 (age 35)
- Place of birth: Écija, Spain
- Height: 1.72 m (5 ft 8 in)
- Position: Left back

Team information
- Current team: Lincoln Red Imps
- Number: 18

Youth career
- Écija
- 2009–2010: Valladolid

Senior career*
Years	Team	Apps	(Gls)
2010–2012	Valladolid B	72	(19)
2012–2014	Getafe B	43	(2)
2014–2015	Écija	16	(1)
2015–2016	Zemplín Michalovce	15	(2)
2016	Europa	11	(0)
2016–2017	Taranto	13	(0)
2017–2018	Europa	40	(2)
2018–2019	Puente Genil	23	(2)
2019–2020	Izarra	36	(10)
2020–2021	Linares Deportivo	24	(2)
2021–2022	Atlético Sanluqueño	34	(6)
2022–2023	Linense	33	(3)
2023–2024	Logroñés	16	(2)
2024	UCAM Murcia	12	(2)
2024–	Lincoln Red Imps	53	(20)
- * Club domestic league appearances and goals as of 22 November 2026

Antonio "Toni" García Montero (born 7 August 1991), is a Spanish footballer who plays as a left back for Gibraltarian club Lincoln Red Imps.

== Club career ==
Born in Écija, Province of Seville, Toni graduated from Real Valladolid's youth system, making his senior debuts with the reserves in the 2010–11 season, in Tercera División. On 9 November 2010 he played his first official game with the first team, featuring 32 minutes in a 1–1 away draw against RCD Espanyol for the campaign's Copa del Rey.

On 6 July 2012 Toni signed with another reserve team, Getafe CF B in Segunda División B. now, in the 2016/2017 he plays in the Italian Lega pro with Taranto club.

On season 2018/19 signed for Puente Genil FC from Europa F.C. of Gibraltar Premier Division.
On the Transfer window 2019 he signed for CD Izarra in Segunda División B.
