= Pepe Reyes Cup =

- Organiser(s): Gibraltar Football Association
- Founded: 2000
- Region: Gibraltar
- Teams: 2
- Current champions: Lincoln Red Imps (13th title)
- Most championships: Lincoln Red Imps (13 titles)

The Pepe Reyes Cup is the Gibraltarian football super cup, contested by the winners of the Gibraltar Football League and the Rock Cup at the Victoria Stadium. In the event that a team wins both the GFL and the Rock Cup, the GFL runners up will face the double winners.

The cup is dedicated to Jose Reyes, president of the Gibraltar Football Association during the 1990s.

== Finals by year ==
Year	Champion	Score	Runner-up	Notes
2000	Glacis United	2–2	Gibraltar United	(Note: Glacis United won 6–5 in a penalty shoot-out)
2001	Lincoln Red Imps	3–1	Gibraltar United	
2002	Lincoln Red Imps	2–0	Gibraltar United	
2003	Manchester 62	1–0	Lincoln Red Imps	
2004	Lincoln Red Imps	3–1	Gibraltar United	
2005	Glacis United	1–1	Lincoln Red Imps	(Note: Glacis United won in a penalty shoot-out)
2006	Manchester 62	2–2	Lincoln Red Imps	(Note: Manchester 62 won 4–2 in a penalty shoot-out)
2007	Lincoln Red Imps	3–1	Manchester 62	
2008	Lincoln Red Imps	3–1	Manchester 62	
2009	Lincoln Red Imps	3–1	Gibraltar United	
2010	Lincoln Red Imps	1–0	St. Joseph's F.C.	
2011	Lincoln Red Imps	1–1	Glacis United	(Note: Lincoln Red Imps won 5–4 in a penalty shoot-out)
2013	St. Joseph's	2–0	Lincoln Red Imps	
2014	Lincoln Red Imps	2–2	St. Joseph's F.C.	(Note: Lincoln Red Imps won 11–10 in a penalty shoot-out)
2015	Lincoln Red Imps	3–2 (a.e.t.)	Europa	
2016	Europa	2–0	Lincoln Red Imps	
2017	Lincoln Red Imps	2–2 (a.e.t.)	Europa	(Note: Lincoln Red Imps won 3–1 in a penalty shoot-out)
2018	Europa	1–1	Lincoln Red Imps	(Note: Europa won 4–2 in a penalty shoot-out)
2019	Europa	1–0	Lincoln Red Imps	
2021	Europa	3–1	Lincoln Red Imps	
2022	Lincoln Red Imps	1–0	Europa	
2023	Bruno's Magpies	1–0	Lincoln Red Imps	
2024	St Joseph's	1–1 (a.e.t.)	Lincoln Red Imps	(Note: St Joseph's won 4–3 in a penalty shoot-out)
2025	Lincoln Red Imps	3–0	Bruno's Magpies	
2026	Lincoln Red Imps	3–1	St. Joseph's F.C.	

== Titles by team ==
Team	Wins	Runners-up	Years won
Lincoln Red Imps	14	10	2001, 2002, 2004, 2007, 2008, 2009, 2010, 2011, 2014, 2015, 2017, 2022, 2025, 2026
Europa	4	3	2016, 2018, 2019, 2021
St. Joseph's	2	3	2013, 2024
Manchester 62	2	2	2003, 2006
Glacis United	2	1	2000, 2005
Bruno's Magpies	1	1	2023
Gibraltar United	–	5	

== See also ==
- Gibraltar Football League
- Gibraltar Premier Division
- Rock Cup
- Gibraltar Premier Cup
