= Lincoln Red Imps F.C. =

Football club in Gibraltar

Lincoln Red Imps
- Full name: Lincoln Red Imps Football Club
- Nickname: The Red Imps
- Short name: Lincoln
- Founded: 1976; 50 years ago as Blue Batons
- Ground: Victoria Stadium
- Capacity: 2,300
- President: Dylan Viagas
- Head coach: Juanma Pavón
- League: Gibraltar Football League
- 2025–26: Gibraltar Football League, 1st of 11 (champions)
- Website: lincolnredimps.gi
Home colours	Away colours

Lincoln Red Imps Football Club is a professional football club from Gibraltar. They play in the Gibraltar Football League, and share Victoria Stadium with all other clubs in the territory. They are the country's record champion with 29 league titles, including fourteen consecutive titles between 2003 and 2016, and in 2014 were the first team to represent Gibraltar in the UEFA Champions League's qualifying stage. In August 2021, Lincoln became the first club from Gibraltar to ever reach the group stages of a European club competition after defeating the Latvian champions Riga FC in the play-off round of the UEFA Europa Conference League.

The club has won seven domestic trebles and four doubles in its history. They hold the record for Europe's longest men's chronological unbeaten league run of 88 matches over 1,959 days from May 2009 to September 2014.

== History ==
The football club was formed in 1976 by Charles Polson and managed by Charles Head. A group of players associated to the old Police youth team called the "Blue Batons" and complemented by players that had been released by Glacis United and St Jago's joined forces to form the first Lincoln team that played in the Gibraltar fourth division as a youth team. The team was named after Lincoln City FC, who are nicknamed the "Imps" after the legend of the Lincoln Imp. Lincoln Red Imps received their name after they were sponsored by Reg Brealey, the former Sheffield United chairman and Lincoln resident who is friends with Charles Polson.

When this Lincoln team became old enough to play Senior Football, it was decided to place the young team into the GFA second division. The team started to climb to the top in the second division in the season 1981–82 winning the league, the division cup and gaining promotion to the GFA's first division after only one season. The next year Lincoln finished in mid table in the first division. In 1983–84 Lincoln won the league and promotion to the Gibraltar Premier Division.

In 1984–85 Lincoln played their first season in the Gibraltar Premier Division in which they were joint champions with Glacis United – the first of seven league titles which were won between 1984 and 1994.

Lincoln won 14 Gibraltar Premier Division titles in a row from 2003 to 2016, bettering the previous record of nine in a row held by Glacis United in the 1960s. They also won the national treble of League, Rock Cup and Senior Cup in 2004, 2005, 2006, 2007, 2008 and 2011.

In 2014, after Gibraltar had joined UEFA as the 54th member, Lincoln became the first Gibraltarian team to play in the qualifying stages of the UEFA Champions League. After claiming a 1–1 draw in the home match, they lost 5–2 at Faroese team HB and were eliminated in the first qualifying round.

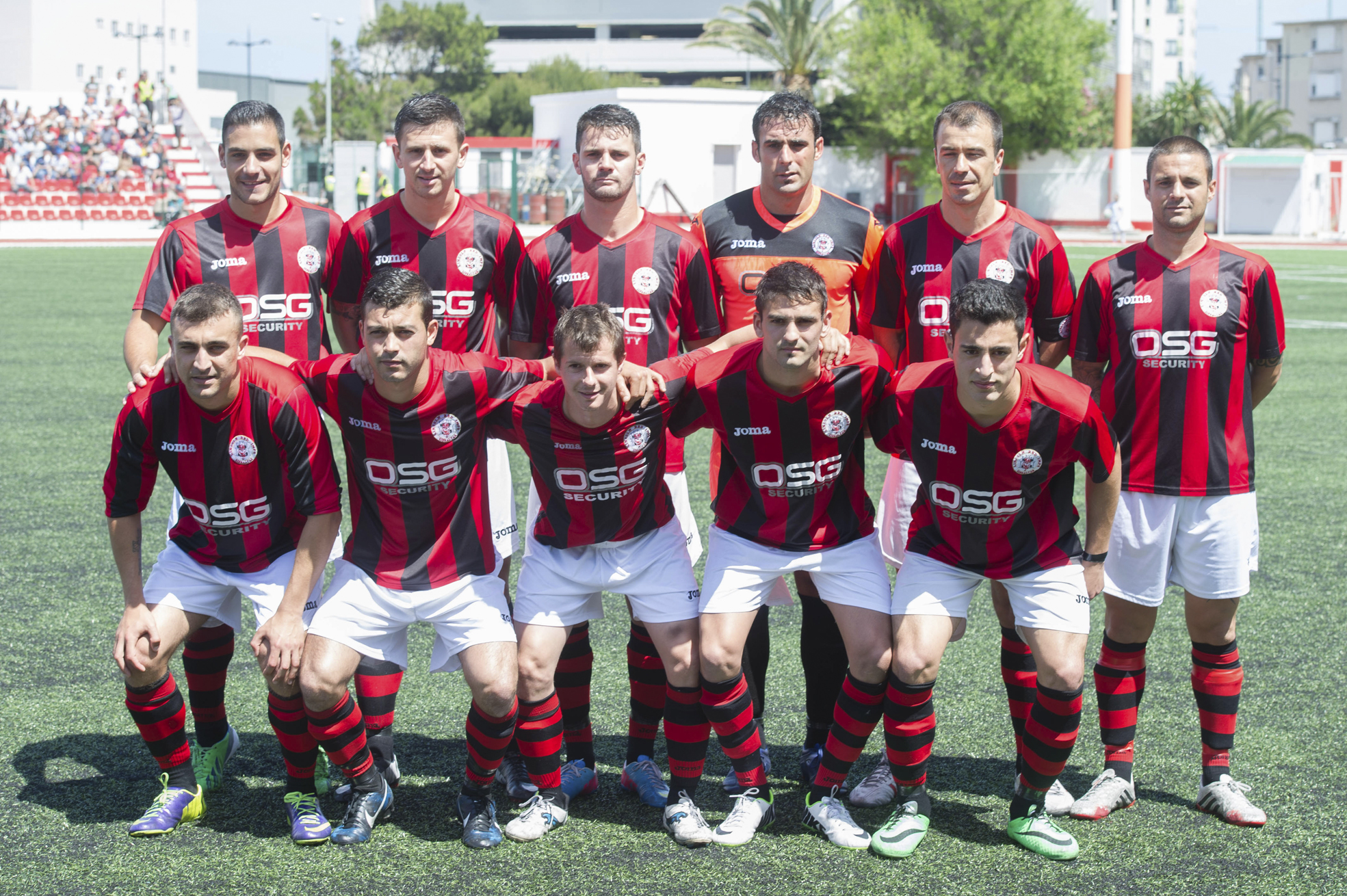
Lincoln Red Imps squad in May 2014

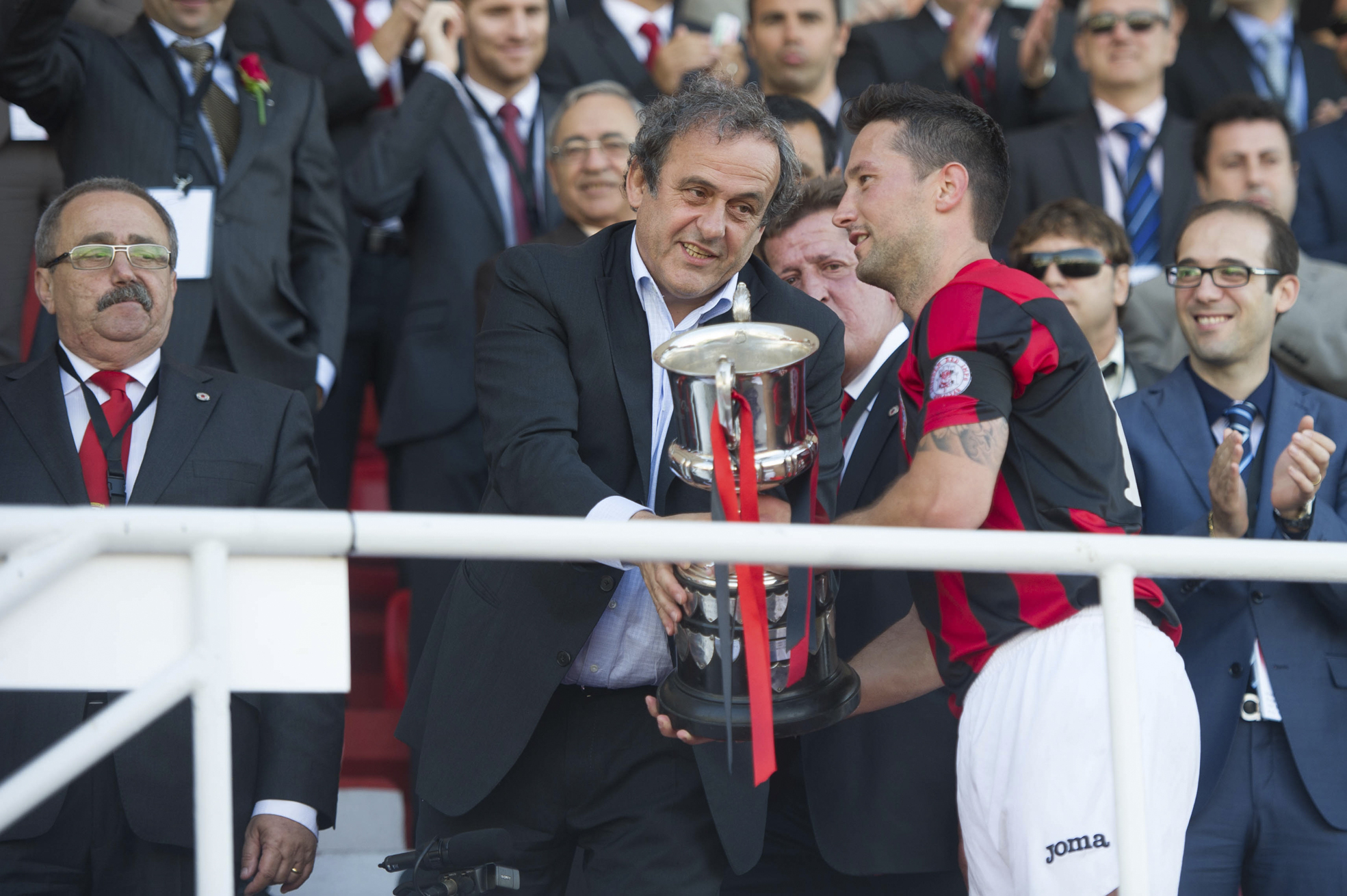
UEFA President Michel Platini at the 2014 Rock Cup presentation

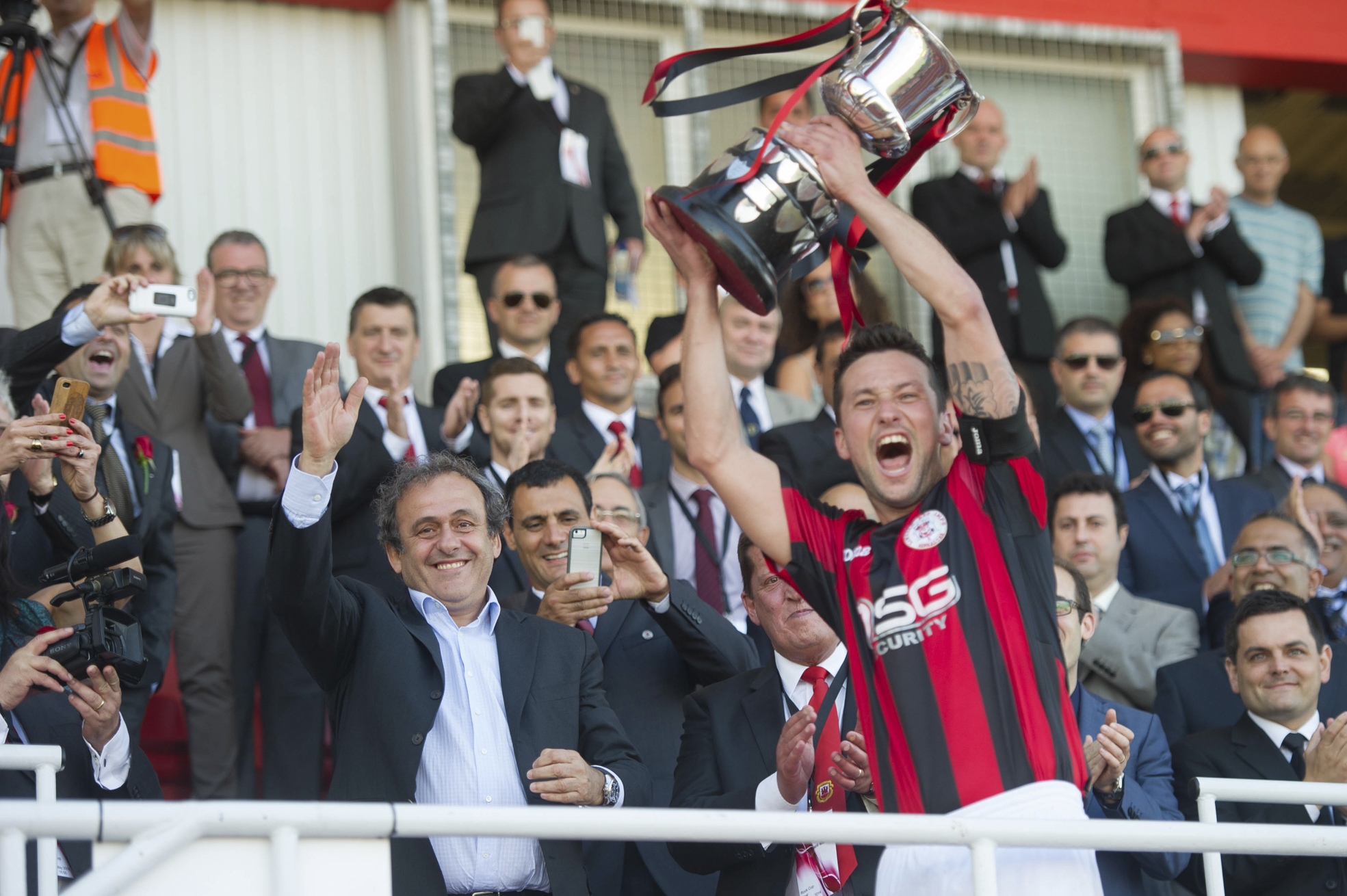
Lincoln Red Imps Captain lifting 2014 Rock Cup from Platini

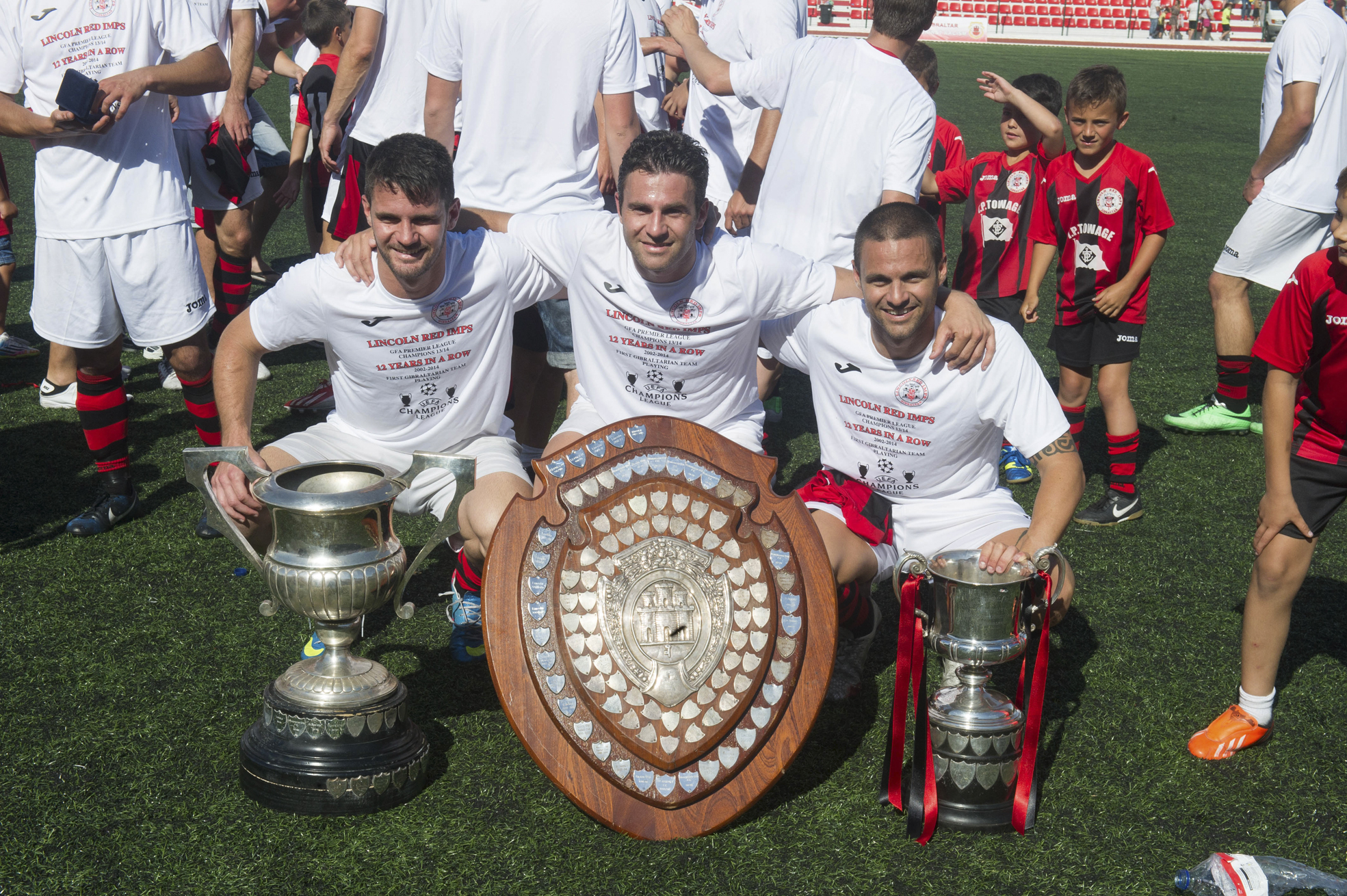
Lincoln Red Imps players with 2014 silverware

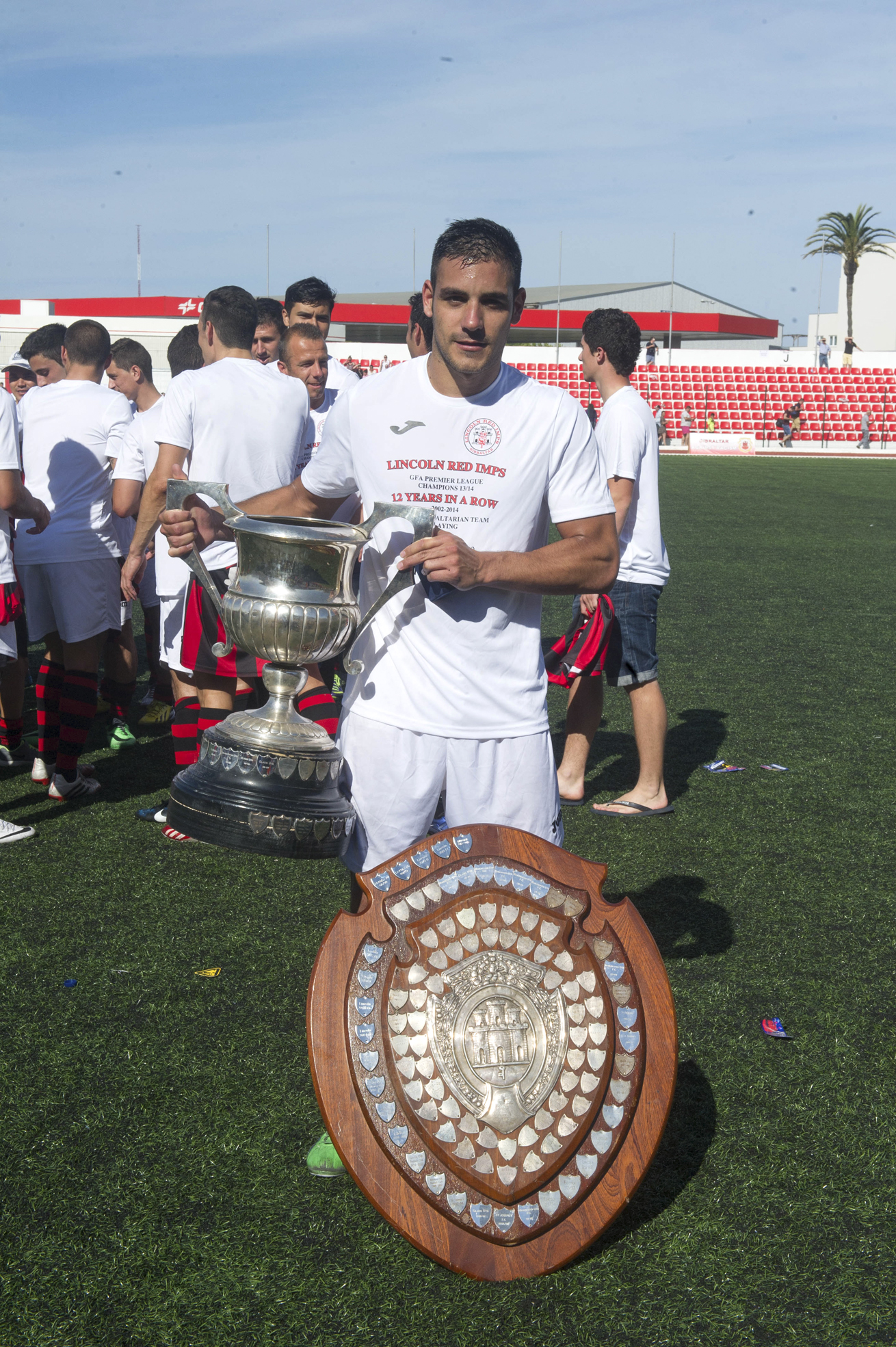
Joseph Chipolina holding plaque commemorating club's Rock Cup victory

Lincoln won both the 2015 Rock Cup with a 4–1 victory over Lynx F.C. and the 2014–15 Gibraltar Premier Division championship by 16 points, again playing in the qualification stages for the UEFA Champions League for with their second straight double. In the First Qualifying Round Lincoln were drawn against FC Santa Coloma of Andorra. After a scoreless draw in the first leg in Gibraltar, the club earned a 2–1 victory at the Estadi Comunal d'Andorra la Vella to advance to the Second Qualifying Round with goals coming from Anthony Bardon and Lee Casciaro. With the victory, Lincoln became the first club from Gibraltar to reach the second round of UEFA Champions League qualification, setting up an encounter with 2015 Danish champions FC Midtjylland, which Lincoln Red Imps lost on aggregate 0–3.

In 2016 Lincoln pulled off a surprise victory against Scottish Premiership champions Celtic, with a 1–0 victory at home after a 48th-minute strike from Lee Casciaro in the club's second round match of the UEFA Champions League qualifying stage. The match was Brendan Rodgers first competitive fixture as manager of Celtic. The Glasgow side still comfortably qualified with a 3–0 victory in the return leg at Celtic Park. It is still seen as one of Celtic's worst moments.

On 26 August 2021, Lincoln became the first team from Gibraltar to qualify for the group stage in a European Competition, as they defeated Riga FC by a score of 3–1 (4–2 aggregate) and advanced to the group stage of the 2021–22 UEFA Europa Conference League.

On 28 August 2025, Lincoln Red Imps qualified for the 2025–26 UEFA Conference League league phase after defeats in the 2025–26 UEFA Europa League play-off round to Braga, making it their second time in European group stage competition. On 23 October 2025, they made history by becoming the first team from Gibraltar to win a match in the European group stage by beating Polish champions, Lech Poznań, 2–1 at home.

== Seasons (since UEFA acceptance) ==
Season	Division	League record								Rock Cup	Pepe Reyes Cup	Europe	
Season	Division	Pld	W	D	L	GF	GA	Pts	Pos	Rock Cup	Pepe Reyes Cup	Competition	Result
2013–14	Premier	14	11	3	0	66	6	36	1st	Winners	Runners-up	—	—
2014–15	Premier	21	19	1	1	80	12	58	1st	Winners	Winners	Champions League	First qualifying round
2015–16	Premier	27	25	1	1	130	9	76	1st	Winners	Winners	Champions League	Second qualifying round
2016–17	Premier	27	23	3	1	100	16	72	2nd	Runners-up	Runners-up	Champions League	Second qualifying round
2017–18	Premier	27	21	2	4	71	19	65	1st	Semi-finals	Winners	Europa League	First qualifying round
2018–19	Premier	27	21	3	3	84	19	66	1st	Second round	Runners-up	Champions League Europa League	Preliminary round Second qualifying round
2019–20	National	17	13	0	4	68	15	39	3rd (Note: The 2019–20 Gibraltar National League season, and the 2020 Rock Cup, were abandoned with the entire league season declared null and void and results expunged due to the COVID-19 pandemic. Therefore the team played 0 official league games that season. The data for the season was taken prior to the abandonment.)	Abandoned	Runners-up	Champions League Europa League	Preliminary round Second qualifying round
2020–21	National	20	15	3	2	62	13	48	1st	Winners	—	Europa League	Second qualifying round
2021–22	National	20	19	1	0	65	17	58	1st	Winners	Runners-up	Champions League Europa League Europa Conference League	Second qualifying round Third qualifying round Group stage
2022–23	GFL	20	17	1	2	68	14	52	1st	Runners-up	Winners	Champions League Europa Conference League	First qualifying round Second qualifying round
2023–24	GFL	25	21	2	2	86	15	65	1st	Winners	Runners-up	Champions League Europa Conference League	First qualifying round Third qualifying round
2024–25	GFL	25	21	3	1	68	7	66	1st	Semi-finals	Runners-up	Champions League Europa League Conference League	Second qualifying round Third qualifying round Play-off round
2025–26	GFL	27	23	3	1	89	17	72	1st	Winners	Winners	Champions League Europa League Conference League	Second qualifying round Play-off round League phase, 26th

== Stadium ==
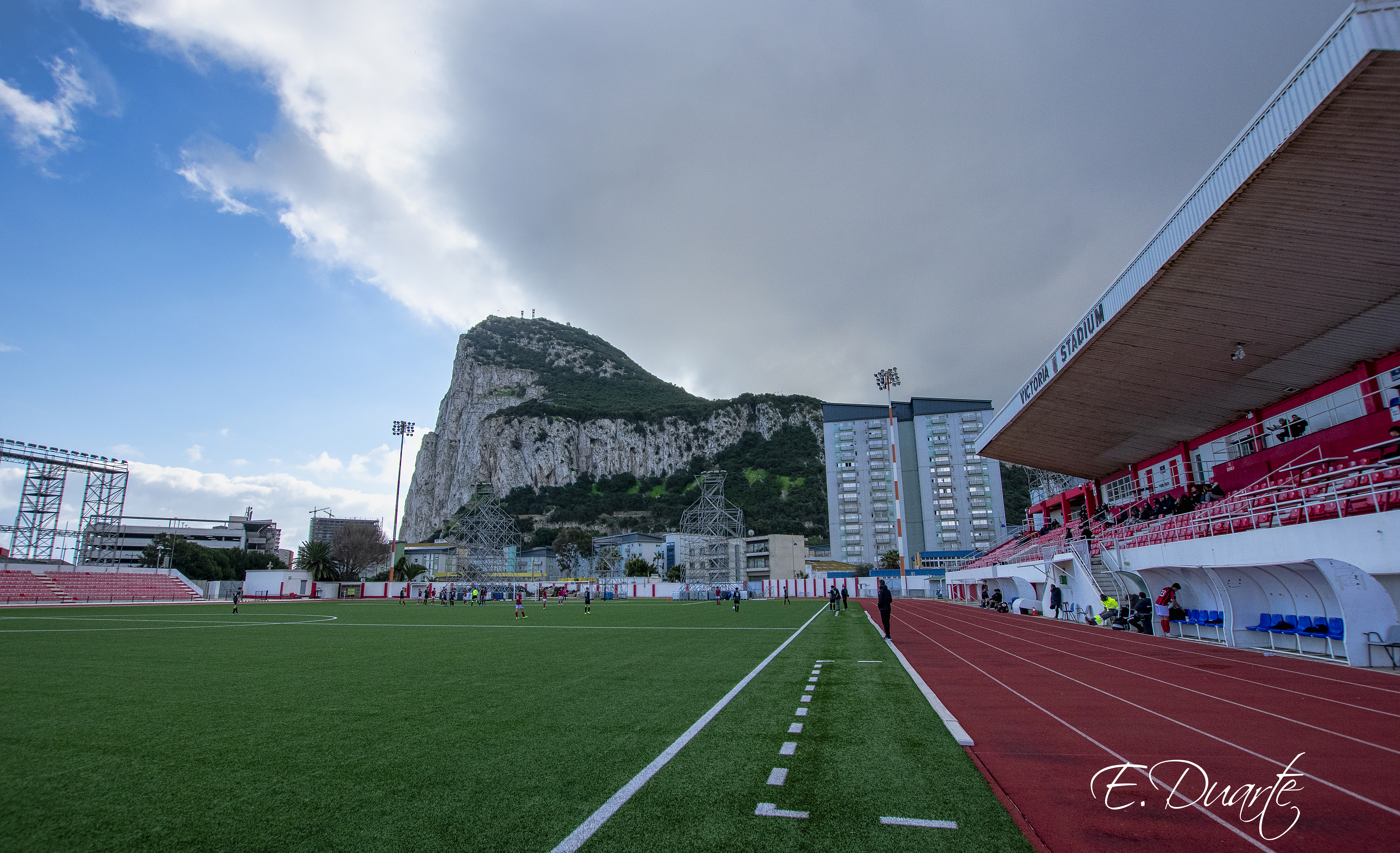
Victoria Stadium

Lincoln has been playing league games at the 2,000-seat Victoria Stadium, shared with other participants of the Gibraltar Premier Division, as well as the Gibraltar Women's Football League, of which Lincoln also runs a team.

Due to the ground's failure to meet guidelines in the 2017–18 season, Lincoln, along with Europa and St Joseph's, were forced to play their European competition matches at the Estadio Algarve in Portugal. Renovations are underway to expand it to a football specific stadium with a capacity of 8,000 seats. Meanwhile, club uses the Europa Sports Park as its home stadium.

== Honours ==
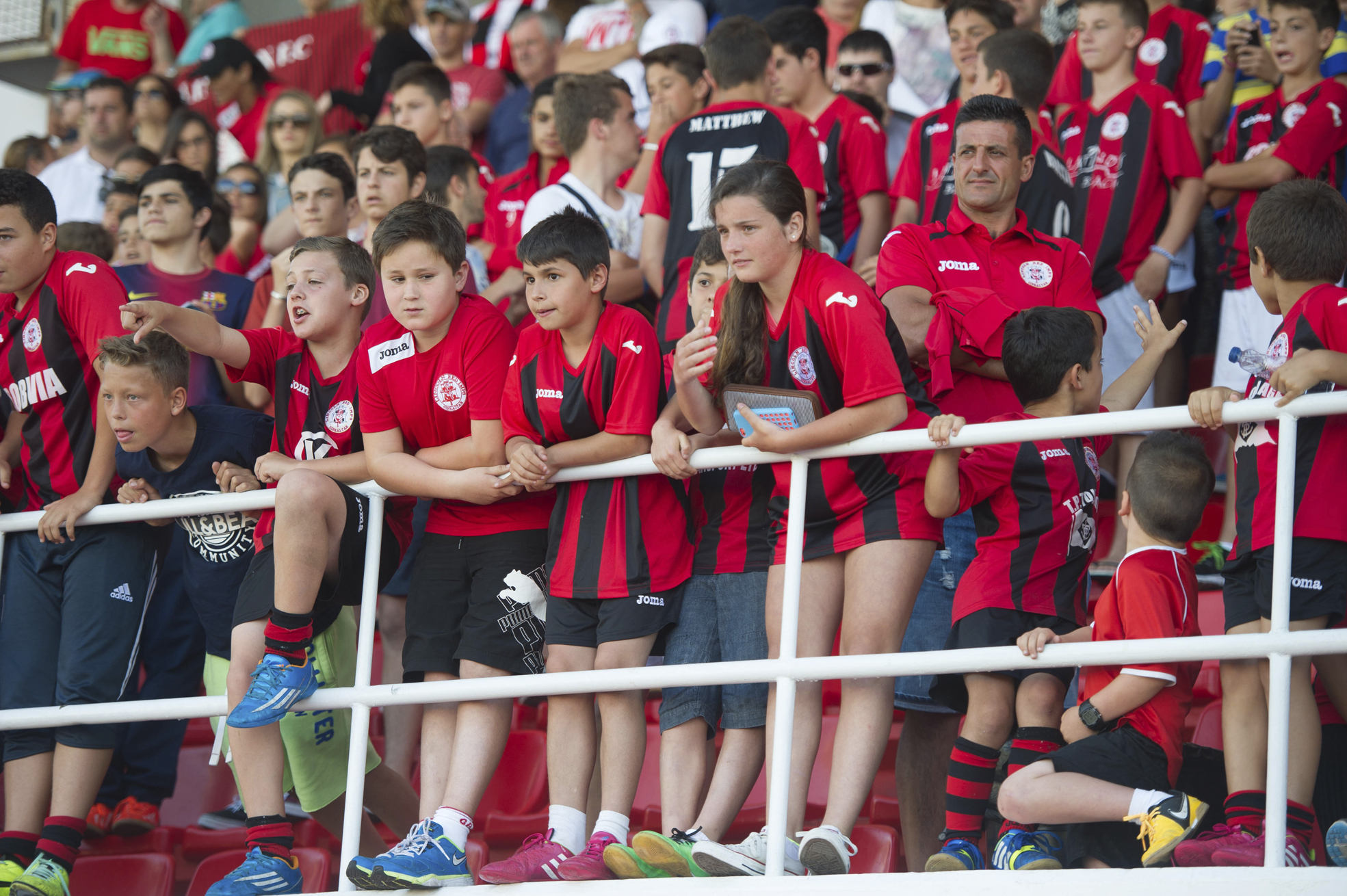
Lincoln Red Imps fans at the Victoria stadium in 2014.

- Gibraltar Premier Division & Gibraltar Football League: 30

1984–85, 1988–89, 1989–90, 1990–91, 1991–92, 1992–93, 1993–94, 2000–01, 2002–03, 2003–04, 2004–05, 2005–06, 2006–07, 2007–08, 2008–09, 2009–10, 2010–11, 2011–12, 2012–13, 2013–14, 2014–15, 2015–16, 2017–18, 2018–19, 2020–21, 2021–22, 2022–23, 2023–24, 2024–25, 2025–26

- Rock Cup: 21

1985–86, 1988–89, 1989–90, 1992–93, 1993–94, 2001–02, 2003–04, 2004–05, 2005–06, 2006–07, 2007–08, 2008–09, 2009–10, 2010–11, 2014, 2015, 2016, 2021, 2021–22, 2023–24, 2025–26

- Pepe Reyes Cup: 14

2001, 2002, 2004, 2007, 2008, 2009, 2010, 2011, 2014, 2015, 2017, 2022, 2025, 2026

- Gibraltar League Senior Cup: 18

1986–87, 1987–88, 1988–89, 1989–90, 1990–91, 1991–92, 1992–93, 1999–2000, 2001–02, 2002–03 (Note: Lincoln Red Imps FC were named as Newcastle FC from 2002–03 until 2006–07.), 2003–04, 2004–05, 2005–06, 2006–07, 2007–08, 2010–11, 2011–12, 2013–14

== European record ==
Lincoln's first qualifying round match of the 2014–15 UEFA Champions League marked the first match played by a Gibraltarian club in UEFA competition. After converting a penalty, a second half goal was conceded and the game ended in a draw.

=== Overall ===
As of match played 5 November 2026

Competition	Pld	W	D	L	GF	GA	GD
UEFA Champions League	33	10	5	18	33	56	–23
UEFA Europa League	19	3	6	10	16	37	–21
UEFA Conference League	25	5	3	17	23	54	–31
Overall	77	18	14	45	72	147	–75

=== Matches ===
Season	Competition	Round	Opponent	Home	Away	Aggregate	Y/N
2014–15	UEFA Champions League	1Q	(Faroe Islands) HB Tórshavn	1–1	2–5	3–6	
2015–16	UEFA Champions League	1Q	(Andorra) Santa Coloma	0–0	2–1	2–1	
2015–16	UEFA Champions League	2Q	(Denmark) Midtjylland	0–2	0–1	0–3	
2016–17	UEFA Champions League	1Q	(Estonia) Flora Tallinn	2–0	1–2	3–2	
2016–17	UEFA Champions League	2Q	(Scotland) Celtic	1–0	0–3	1–3	
2017–18	UEFA Europa League	1Q	(Cyprus) AEK Larnaca	1–1	0–5	1–6	
2018–19	UEFA Champions League	PR	(San Marino) La Fiorita	2–0		—N/a	
2018–19	UEFA Champions League	PR	(Kosovo) Drita	1–4		—N/a	
2018–19	UEFA Europa League	2Q	(Wales) The New Saints	1–1	1–2	2–3	
2019–20	UEFA Champions League	PR	(Kosovo) Feronikeli	0–1		—N/a	
2019–20	UEFA Europa League	2Q	Ararat-Armenia	1–2	0–2	1–4	
2020–21	UEFA Europa League	PR	(Kosovo) Prishtina	3–0 (awd.)	—N/a	—N/a	
2020–21	UEFA Europa League	1Q	(Luxembourg) Union Titus Pétange	2–0	—N/a	—N/a	
2020–21	UEFA Europa League	2Q	(Scotland) Rangers	0–5	—N/a	—N/a	
2021–22	UEFA Champions League	1Q	(Luxembourg) Fola Esch	5–0	2–2	7–2	
2021–22	UEFA Champions League	2Q	(Romania) CFR Cluj	1–2	0–2	1–4	
2021–22	UEFA Europa League	3Q	(Slovakia) Slovan Bratislava	1–3	1–1	2–4	
2021–22	UEFA Europa Conference League	PO	(Latvia) Riga	3–1 (a.e.t.)	1–1	4–2	
2021–22	UEFA Europa Conference League	GS	(Denmark) Copenhagen	0–4	1–3	4th place	
2021–22	UEFA Europa Conference League	GS	(Greece) PAOK	0–2	0–2	4th place	
2021–22	UEFA Europa Conference League	GS	(Slovakia) Slovan Bratislava	1–4	0–2	4th place	
2022–23	UEFA Champions League	1Q	(North Macedonia) Shkupi	2–0	0–3	2–3	
2022–23	UEFA Europa Conference League	2Q	(Kazakhstan) Tobol	0–1	0–2	0−3	
2023–24	UEFA Champions League	1Q	(Azerbaijan) Qarabağ	1–2	0–4	1–6	
2023–24	UEFA Europa Conference League	2Q	Bye	—N/a	—N/a	—N/a	
2023–24	UEFA Europa Conference League	3Q	(Kosovo) Ballkani	1–3	0–2	1–5	
2024–25	UEFA Champions League	1Q	(Malta) Ħamrun Spartans	0–1 (a.e.t.)	1–0	1–1 (5–4 p)	
2024–25	UEFA Champions League	2Q	(Azerbaijan) Qarabağ	0–2	0–5	0–7	
2024–25	UEFA Europa League	3Q	(Belarus) Dinamo Minsk	2–1	0–2	2–3	
2024–25	UEFA Conference League	PO	(Northern Ireland) Larne	2–1	1–3	3–4	
2025–26	UEFA Champions League	1Q	(Faroe Islands) Víkingur	1–0	3–2	4–2	
2025–26	UEFA Champions League	2Q	(Serbia) Red Star Belgrade	0–1	1–5	1–6	
2025–26	UEFA Europa League	3Q	(Armenia) Noah	1–1	0–0 (a.e.t.)	1–1 (6–5 p)	
2025–26	UEFA Europa League	PO	(Portugal) Braga	0–4	1–5	1–9	
2025–26	UEFA Conference League	LP	(Bosnia and Herzegovina) Zrinjski Mostar	—N/a	0–5	26th place	
2025–26	UEFA Conference League	LP	(Poland) Lech Poznań	2–1	—N/a	26th place	
2025–26	UEFA Conference League	LP	(Croatia) Rijeka	1–1	—N/a	26th place	
2025–26	UEFA Conference League	LP	(Malta) Ħamrun Spartans	—N/a	1–3	26th place	
2025–26	UEFA Conference League	LP	(Czech Republic) Sigma Olomouc	2–1	—N/a	26th place	
2025–26	UEFA Conference League	LP	(Poland) Legia Warsaw	—N/a	1–4	26th place	
2026–27	UEFA Champions League	1Q	(Andorra) Inter Club d'Escaldes	3–1	1–1	4–2	
2026–27	UEFA Champions League	2Q	(Sweden) Mjällby AIF	0–0	0–3	0–3	
2026–27	UEFA Europa League	3Q	(Cyprus) Omonia	1–1	0–1	1–2	
2026–27	UEFA Conference League	PO	(Northern Ireland) Larne	0–2	3–0	3–2	
2026–27	UEFA Conference League	LP	(Norway) Brann	—N/a	1–2	TBD	
2026–27	UEFA Conference League	LP	(Netherlands) Twente	1–4	—N/a	TBD	
2026–27	UEFA Conference League	LP	(Croatia) Hajduk Split	1–0	—N/a	TBD	
2026–27	UEFA Conference League	LP	(Albania) Egnatia	—N/a		TBD	
2026–27	UEFA Conference League	LP	(Denmark) Midtjylland		—N/a	TBD	
2026–27	UEFA Conference League	LP	(France) AS Monaco	—N/a		TBD	

Notes

- PR: Preliminary round
- 1Q: First qualifying round
- 2Q: Second qualifying round
- 3Q: Third qualifying round
- PO: Play-off round
- GS: Group stage
- LP: League phase

== Players ==
=== First team ===
As of 4 July 2026

No.	Pos.	Nation	Player
1	GK	ESP	Nauzet Santana
2	DF	GIB	Ethan Jolley
3	DF	ESP	Christian Rutjens
4	MF	NED	Nico Pinto
5	DF	URU	Gabri Cardozo
6	DF	GIB	Bernardo Lopes (captain)
7	FW	GIB	Lee Casciaro
8	MF	ESP	Mandi
9	FW	PHI	Kike Gómez
10	FW	ESP	Álex Mula
11	MF	ESP	Álvaro Romero
13	GK	GIB	Jaylan Hankins
16	FW	GIB	Leon Mason

No.	Pos.	Nation	Player
18	FW	ESP	Toni García
19	FW	ESP	Yussef Flalhi
20	DF	GIB	Ethan Britto
21	DF	ESP	Nano
22	MF	GIB	Graeme Torrilla
23	MF	ESP	Joe
27	GK	BEL	Mark Hamm
32	FW	ARG	Facu Álvarez
33	DF	GIB	Jay Coombes
44	FW	ESP	Manu Toledano
66	DF	NED	Julliani Eersteling
77	FW	GIB	Theo Montovio
99	FW	EGY	Ayman El Ghobashy

==== Out on loan ====
Note: Flags indicate national team as defined under FIFA eligibility rules; some limited exceptions apply. Players may hold more than one non-FIFA nationality.

No.	Pos.	Nation	Player
25	GK	GIB	Ryan Smith (at (Wales) Rhydymdwyn)

== Club staff ==
Position	Name
Head coach	(Spain) Juanma Pavón
Assistant coach	(Spain) José María Pajares (Gibraltar) Daniel Segovia
Goalkeeper coach	(Spain) Miguel Ángel Bazán
Fitness coach	(Spain) Álvaro Echevarne Gómez
U23 Head coach	(Gibraltar) Ryan Casciaro
U23 Assistant coach	(Gibraltar) Kyle Goldwin
Head physio	(Gibraltar) Keith Ramirez
Team doctor	(Spain) Francisco Moya
Kitman	(Spain) Alberto Torremocha
Performance Analyst	(Italy) Diego Bartoli
Board
President	(Gibraltar) Dylan Viagas
Director	(Gibraltar) Christian Laguea
Director	(Gibraltar) Elton Duarte
Sporting director	(Spain) Juan José Gallardo
Secretary	(Gibraltar) Michael Ruiz

== See also ==
- List of unbeaten football club seasons
