= Daniel Duarte (Gibraltarian footballer) =

Gibraltarian footballer (born 1979)

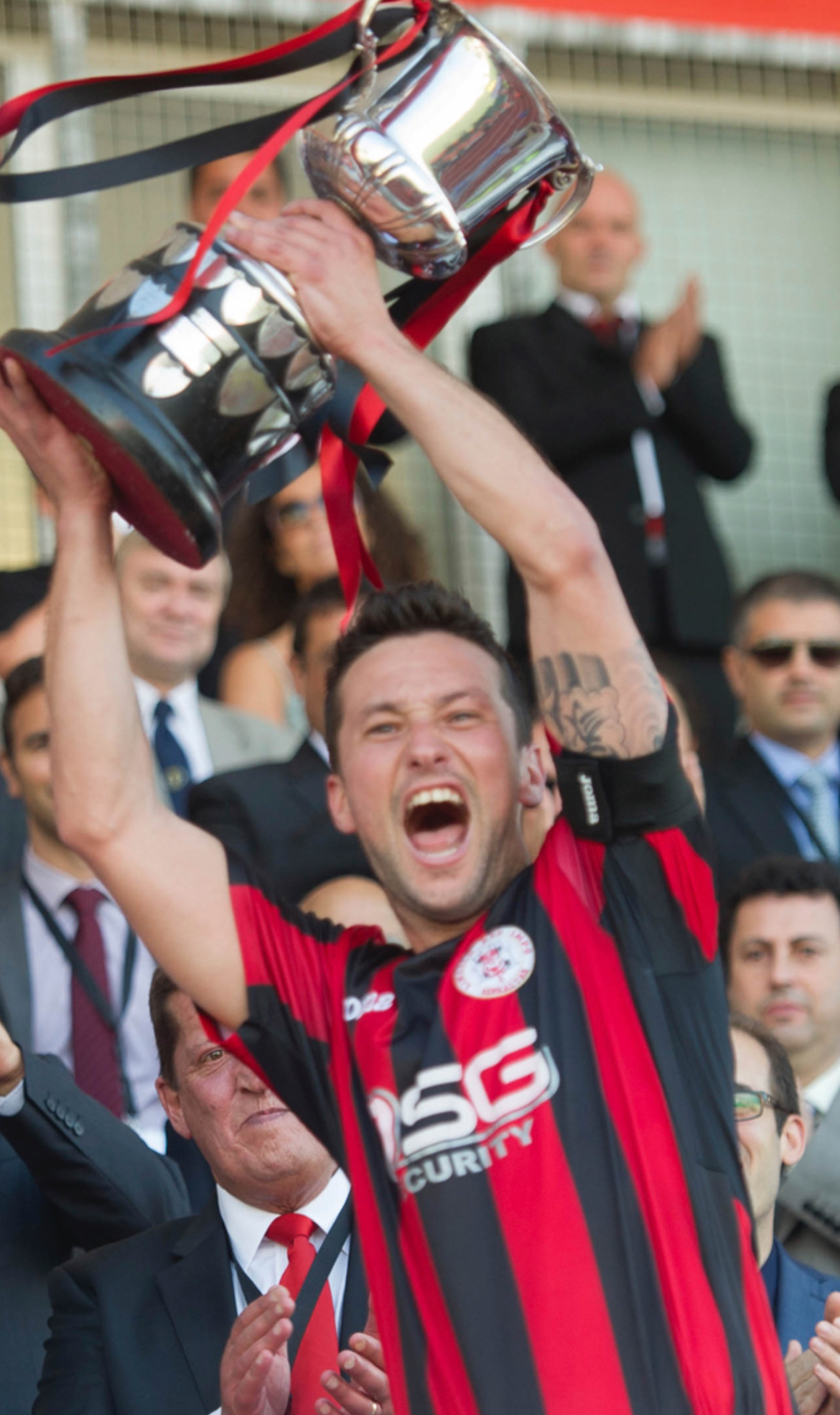
- Duarte lifting the Rock Cup after the 2014 Rock Cup final

Personal information
- Date of birth: 25 October 1979 (age 47)
- Place of birth: Gibraltar
- Position: Midfielder

Senior career*
Years	Team	Apps	(Gls)
1995–2015	Lincoln Red Imps (Note: Lincoln stats before 2013 are unknown)	18	(1)
2015–2016	Manchester 62	9	(0)

International career^{‡}
2013–2014	Gibraltar	3	(0)
- * Club domestic league appearances and goals as of 21:30, 19 November 2013 (UTC) ‡ National team caps and goals as of 19:05, 6 March 2014 (UTC)

Daniel Duarte (born 25 October 1979) is a Gibraltarian former footballer who mostly played for Gibraltar Premier Division side Lincoln Red Imps, as well as the Gibraltar national team, where he played as a central midfielder. With 46 titles with Lincoln Red Imps, he is the second most decorated footballer in association football history, only surpassed by his former teammate Lee Casciaro.

== International career ==
Duarte made his international debut with Gibraltar on 19 November 2013 in a 0–0 home draw with Slovakia. This was Gibraltar's first game since being admitted to UEFA.

=== International career statistics ===
As of match played 5 March 2014.

Gibraltar national team
Year	Apps	Goals
2013	1	0
2014	2	0
Total	3	0

== Honours ==
Lincoln Red Imps

- Gibraltar Premier Division (14): 2000–01, 2002–03, 2003–04, 2004–05, 2005–06, 2006–07, 2007–08, 2008–09, 2009–10, 2010–11, 2011–12, 2012–13, 2013–14, 2014–15
- Rock Cup (11): 2001–02, 2003–04, 2004–05, 2005–06, 2006–07, 2007–08, 2008–09, 2009–10, 2010–11, 2014, 2015
- Pepe Reyes Cup (10): 2001, 2002, 2004, 2007, 2008, 2009, 2010, 2011, 2014, 2015
- Gibraltar League Senior Cup (11): 1999–2000, 2001–02, 2002–03, 2003–04, 2004–05, 2005–06, 2006–07, 2007–08, 2010–11, 2011–12, 2013–14
