= 2014–15 Gibraltar Premier Cup =

Tournament details
- Country: Gibraltar
- Dates: 5 December 2014 − 14 February 2015
- Teams: 8

Final positions
- Champions: College Europa
- Runners-up: St Joseph's

The 2014–15 Gibraltar Cup, also known as the Senior Cup 2014-15, is the 2nd edition of the Gibraltar Premier Cup, a competition for the teams in the Gibraltar Premier Division, the top tier of football in Gibraltar.

== Format ==
The eight teams from the Gibraltar Premier Division are split into two groups of four teams. The teams play each other once. The top two teams from each group advance to single-leg semifinals. The two semifinal winners play each other in a single match for the Cup.

== Groups ==
=== Group A ===
Pos	Team	Pld	W	D	L	GF	GA	GD	Pts	Qualification
1	Lincoln	3	3	0	0	12	1	+11	9	Qualification for Semifinals
2	Lions Gibraltar	3	1	1	1	3	8	−5	4	Qualification for Semifinals
3	Lynx	3	1	0	2	3	5	−2	3	
4	Manchester 62	3	0	1	2	2	6	−4	1	

Source: GFA
Rules for classification: 1) points; 2) goal difference; 3) number of goals scored

6 December 2014	Lions Gibraltar	1–1	Manchester 62	Victoria Stadium
17:00	Luque Lopez 89'		Giles Lopez 51'

6 December 2014	Lincoln Red Imps	3–0	Lynx	Victoria Stadium
19:30	Perez 45'; Iglecias Garcia 81'; Walker 90'

12 December 2014	Lions Gibraltar	0–6	Lincoln Red Imps	Victoria Stadium
20:30			Mascarenhas-Olivero 9' (o.g.); Chipolina 11'; Walker 15', 50'; Perez 65'; L. Casciaro 89'

13 December 2014	Manchester 62	0–2	Lynx	Victoria Stadium
16:00			Caballero Vilches 50'; Fernando Ponce 53'

19 December 2014	Lincoln Red Imps	3–1	Manchester 62	Victoria Stadium
20:30

22 December 2014	Lions Gibraltar	2–1	Lynx	Victoria Stadium

=== Group B ===
Pos	Team	Pld	W	D	L	GF	GA	GD	Pts	Qualification
1	College Europa (Note: College Europa were awarded a 3–0 win when Britannia XI failed to field a team)	3	3	0	0	8	1	+7	9	Qualification for Semifinals
2	St Joseph's	3	2	0	1	12	2	+10	6	Qualification for Semifinals
3	Britannia XI	3	1	0	2	2	9	−7	3	
4	Glacis United	3	0	0	3	1	11	−10	0	

Source: GFA
Rules for classification: 1) points; 2) goal difference; 3) number of goals scored
Notes:

5 December 2014	Britannia XI	1–6	St Joseph's	Victoria Stadium
20:30	Kristian D'Rosario 16'		Enrique Montes 22', 47', 76', 77'; Albizu Gutierez 40'; Sanz Balsalobre 54'

8 December 2014	Glacis United	1–4	College Europa	Victoria Stadium
20:30	Jamie Currer 61'		Cristian Toncheff 6', 34', 70', 90'

13 December 2014	Britannia XI	1–0	Glacis United	Victoria Stadium
18:00	Nick Pecino 81'

15 December 2014	St Joseph's	0–1	College Europa	Victoria Stadium
20:30

20 December 2014	Glacis United	0–6	St Joseph's	Victoria Stadium

20 December 2014	Britannia XI	0–3; Awarded	College Europa	Victoria Stadium

== Semifinals ==
The top two teams from each group advance to the semifinals.

24 January 2015	Lincoln Red Imps	1–5	St Joseph's	Victoria Stadium

24 January 2015	College Europa	1–1 (a.e.t.) (6–5 p)	Lions Gibraltar	Victoria Stadium

== Final ==
14 February 2015	St Joseph's	1–2 (a.e.t.)	College Europa	Victoria Stadium
