= List of Gibraltar football transfers summer 2016 =

This is a list of Gibraltar Premier Division football transfers for the 2016/17 season. Only moves featuring at least one Premier Division club are listed.

The transfer window began once clubs had concluded their final domestic fixture of the 2015–16 season, but many transfers will only officially go through on 1 July because the majority of player contracts finish on 30 June. The window closed on 7 September 2016.

Europa FC
| IN | | OUT | |
| Player | Team | Player | Team |
| (Ghana) Mustapha Yahaya | (Netherlands) FC Twente | (Spain) Javi Fernandez | (Spain) Velez CF |
| (Spain) Eloy Miguel Villodres | (Spain) UD San Pedro | (Spain) Isaac Luis Chico | (Spain) CD San Roque |
| (Spain) Isaac Luis Chico | (Spain) AD Ceuta | (Spain) Jesus Negrillo | (Spain) Martos CD |
| (Spain) Felix Lopez | (Spain) CD El Palo | (Spain) Felix Lopez | (Spain) Antequera CF |
| (Spain) Karim Pinero | (Gibraltar) Lynx FC | (Spain) Adrian Pavon | (Spain) CD Torrevieja |
| (Spain) Javier Garcia Iglesias | (Spain) Huetor Tajar | (Spain) Alex Vazquez | (Spain) CD Torrevieja |
| (Spain) Enrique Gomez Bernal | (Spain) Pilas UD | (Spain) Pedro Carrion | (Spain) Xerez CD |
| (Gibraltar) Liam Walker | (Gibraltar) Lincoln Red Imps FC | (Spain) Jose Manuel Morales | Released |
| (Gibraltar) Sykes Garro | Lions Gibraltar | (Romania) Lucian Burdujan | (Greece) AEL Kalloni |
| (Gibraltar) Sean Gilbert | Gibraltar United FC | (Spain) Javi Martinez | (Spain) Velez CF |
| (Gibraltar) Steven Gilbert | Gibraltar United FC | (Spain) Francisco Sanchez | Released |
| (Gibraltar) Colin Machin | (Gibraltar) Mons Calpe SC | (Spain) Joaquin Garcia | (Spain) Huércal Overa |
| (Gibraltar) Kieron Bosano | (Gibraltar) Mons Calpe SC | (Spain) Toni Garcia | (Italy) Taranto |
| (Gibraltar) Aidan Casey | (Gibraltar) Red Imps | | |
| (Gibraltar) Stefan Oliva | (Gibraltar) Red Imps | | |
| (Gibraltar) Kyan Prescott | (Gibraltar) Red Imps | | |
| (Gibraltar) Ethan Santos | (Gibraltar) Lynx FC | | |
| (Gibraltar) Luke Evans | (Gibraltar) Europa U17 | | |
| (Ghana) Ibrahim Ayew | (Ghana) Asante Kotoko | | |
| (France) James Adams | (France) Lizzy Sports Academy | | |
| (Spain) Ruben Fernandez Ruiz | (Gibraltar) Mons Calpe SC | | |
| (Spain) Jose Manuel Gallego | Free Transfer | | |
| (Spain) Yeray Romero | Free Transfer | | |

Europa Point FC
| IN | | OUT | |
| Player | Team | Player | Team |
| (England) Tom Walters | (England) Norwich City | (Spain) Miguel Gabriel Michan Medinas | Released |
| (Canada) Uday Arora | (United States) Mercyhurst | (Spain) Alexis Sanchez | (Spain) Algeciras CF |
| (Gibraltar) Luis McCoy | Lions Gibraltar FC | (Spain) Christian Nunez | (Spain) Algeciras CF |
| (Spain) George Jermy | (Spain) Xerez CD | (Spain) Alioune Ndiaye Gonzalez | (Spain) Algeciras CF |
| (Spain) Alvaro Perez | (Spain) CD Los Barrios | (Spain) Giovani | Released |
| (Australia) Sean Eve | (Australia) Sutherland Sharks | (Morocco) Youssef Akdi El Morabet | Released |
| (Spain) Jorge Diaz | (Spain) CD San Roque | (Spain) Adrian Hormigo Lopez | Released |
| (Canada) Will Sykes | (Spain) Pro Direct Soccer Academy | (Spain) Isaac Cereto Puerta | Released |
| (Australia) Dakota Askew | (Australia) Blacktown City Demons | (Ghana) Glenn Ekow Ampah | Released |
| (Brazil) Charles Mallmann | (United States) Miami United | (Spain) Jose Garcia Nieto | (Gibraltar) Angels FC |
| (Gibraltar) Kivan Castle | (Gibraltar) St Joseph's FC | (Spain) Isaac Cortes Vazquez | Released |
| | | (Spain) Antonio Jimenez Benitez | Released |
| | | (Spain) Chapeto | Released |

Gibraltar United FC
| IN | | OUT | |
| Player | Team | Player | Team |
| | | (Gibraltar) Adrian Lopez | (Gibraltar) FC Olympique 13 |
| (Gibraltar) Jesse Victory | (Gibraltar) Manchester 62 FC^{x} | (Gibraltar) Alan Parker | (Gibraltar) Mons Calpe SC |
| (Gibraltar) Jamie Bosio | (Gibraltar) Lincoln Red Imps FC^{x} | (Gibraltar) Sean Gilbert | (Gibraltar) Europa FC |
| (Gibraltar) Ashley Rodriguez | (Gibraltar) Lions Gibraltar^{x} | (Gibraltar) Steven Gilbert | (Gibraltar) Europa FC |
| (Gibraltar) Anthony Hernandez | (Gibraltar) Manchester 62 FC^{x} | (Gibraltar) Jamie Ellul | Boca Juniors (Gibraltar) |
| (Gibraltar) Andrew Hernandez | (Gibraltar) Manchester 62 FC^{x} | (Gibraltar) Carl Ellul | (Gibraltar) FC Olympique 13 |
| (Tunisia) Aymen Mouelhi | (Gibraltar) Lions Gibraltar^{x} | | |
| (Gibraltar) Jason Pusey | (Gibraltar) Manchester 62 | | |
| (Gibraltar) Alain Pons | (Gibraltar) Lincoln Red Imps FC^{x} | | |
| (Gibraltar) Erin Barnett | (Gibraltar) Lions Gibraltar^{x} | | |
| (Gibraltar) Dion Hammond | Gibraltar United FC^{x} | | |
| (Sweden) (Gibraltar) Max Bothen | (Gibraltar) Bruno's Magpies | | |
| (Gibraltar) Paul Podesta | Free transfer | | |

Glacis United FC
| IN | | OUT | |
| Player | Team | Player | Team |
| | | (Argentina) Tomas Barletta | (Spain) Rayo Cantabria |
| | | (Argentina) Juan Pablo Pereira | (Gibraltar) Mons Calpe SC^{x} |
| | | (Gibraltar) Dion Hammond | Gibraltar United FC^{x} |
| | | (Italy) Sacha Funes | (Gibraltar) Mons Calpe SC^{x} |
| | | (Spain) German Cortes Narvaez | (Gibraltar) Gib Phoenix |
| | | (Spain) David Horner Garcia | (Gibraltar) Gib Phoenix |
| | | (Spain) Francisco Javier Moreno | (Gibraltar) Gib Phoenix |

Lincoln Red Imps FC
| IN | | OUT | |
| Player | Team | Player | Team |
| (Spain) Manuel Soler | (Spain) Real Balompedica Linense | (Spain) Juan Francisco Garcia | (Georgia (country)) Saburtalo |
| (Gibraltar) Jaylan Hankins | (Gibraltar) Red Imps | (Gibraltar) Ethan Jolley | (Gibraltar) Mons Calpe SC^{x} |
| (Spain) Jesus Rojas | (Spain) UD San Pedro | (Gibraltar) Jamie Bosio | Gibraltar United FC^{x} |
| (Spain) Juan Francisco Garcia | (Spain) Marbella | (Portugal) Ruben Freitas | (Portugal) União Desportiva Vilafranquense |
| (Uruguay) Cristhian Colman | (Uruguay) Juventud | (Argentina) Guido Abayian | (Bulgaria) Etar Veliko Tarnovo |
| (Spain) Adrian Golpe | Free transfer | (Gibraltar) Liam Walker | (Gibraltar) Europa FC |
| | | (Gibraltar) Steven Soussi | (Gibraltar) Lynx |
| | | (Gibraltar) Scott Ballentine | Released |
| | | (Gibraltar) Alain Pons | Released |
| | | (Gibraltar) Bradley Banda | Released |

Lions Gibraltar FC
| IN | | OUT | |
| Player | Team | Player | Team |
| (Spain) Sam Gilroy | (Gibraltar) FC Britannia XI | (Spain) Manuel Cantizano | (Gibraltar) St Joseph's FC |
| (Gibraltar) Louie Barnfather | (Gibraltar) FC Britannia XI^{x} | (Spain) Jose Luis Romero | (Gibraltar) St Joseph's FC |
| (Gibraltar) Shea Breakspear | (Gibraltar) FC Britannia XI^{x} | (Gibraltar) Richie Parral | (Gibraltar) Mons Calpe SC^{x} |
| (Gibraltar) Jeremy Lopez | (Gibraltar) Manchester 62^{x} | (Spain) Andres Salas | (Iceland) Leiknir F |
| (Gibraltar) Lee Muscat | (Gibraltar) Free Transfer | (Spain) Sergio Gines | (Spain) UD Tesorillo |
| (Gibraltar) Al Greene | Free transfer | (Gibraltar) Ashley Rodriguez | Gibraltar United FC^{x} |
| (Gibraltar) Graeme Torrilla | (Gibraltar) Red Imps | (Tunisia) Aymen Mouelhi | Gibraltar United FC^{x} |
| (Gibraltar) Riki Duarte | (Gibraltar) St Joseph's FC | (Gibraltar) Sykes Garro | (Gibraltar) Europa FC |
| (Gibraltar) Jayce Consigliero | (Gibraltar) Red Imps | (Gibraltar) Erin Barnett | Gibraltar United FC^{x} |
| (Gibraltar) Tarik Charayeh | (Gibraltar) Red Imps | (Spain) Salvador Garcia | (Spain) UD Los Barrios |
| (Gibraltar) Evan Coleing | (Gibraltar) Red Imps | (Spain) David Narvaez | (Spain) Xerez CD |
| (Gibraltar) Thomas Hastings | (Gibraltar) FC Britannia XI^{x} | (Spain) Diego Pacheco | (Gibraltar) Manchester 62^{x} |
| | | (Gibraltar) Luis McCoy | (Gibraltar) Europa Point |
| | | (Netherlands) Adam Szpilczynski | Released |
| | | (Spain) Raul Segura | (Gibraltar) Lynx |
| | | (Spain) Jonay Lopez Luque | Boca Juniors (Gibraltar) |

Lynx FC
| IN | | OUT | |
| Player | Team | Player | Team |
| (Spain) Raul Segura | (Gibraltar) Lions Gibraltar^{x} | (Gibraltar) Jamie Robba | (England) Torquay United |
| (Gibraltar) Steven Soussi | (Gibraltar) Lincoln Red Imps FC^{x} | (Gibraltar) Gabriel Lucudi | (Gibraltar) FC Hound Dogs |
| | | (Gibraltar) Jaydan Parody | (Gibraltar) Mons Calpe SC |
| | | (Gibraltar) Ethan Santos | (Gibraltar) Europa FC |
| | | (Italy) Aaron Akrapovic | (Italy) ACR Messina |
| | | (Spain) Carlos Sanchez | (Gibraltar) St Joseph's FC |
| | | (Spain) Javi Chacon | (Gibraltar) Manchester 62^{x} |

Manchester 62 FC
| IN | | OUT | |
| Player | Team | Player | Team |
| (Spain) Jose Dominguez | (Spain) CD San Roque de Lepe | (Gibraltar) Jesse Victory | Gibraltar United FC^{x} |
| (Spain) Miguel Garcia | (Spain) CD Vazquez Cultural | (Gibraltar) Max Cottrell | (Gibraltar) Mons Calpe SC |
| (Gibraltar) Andrew Lopez | Free transfer | (Gibraltar) John Paul Duarte | (Gibraltar) St Joseph's FC |
| (Gibraltar) Mark Casciaro | Free transfer^{x} | (Gibraltar) Matthew Reoch | (Gibraltar) FC Olympique 13 |
| (Spain) Diego Pacheco | (Gibraltar) Lions Gibraltar^{x} | (Gibraltar) Tyson Ruiz | (Gibraltar) Mons Calpe SC |
| (Spain) Javi Chacon | (Gibraltar) Lynx FC | (Gibraltar) Anthony Hernandez | Gibraltar United^{x} |
| | | (Gibraltar) Andrew Hernandez | Gibraltar United^{x} |
| | | (Gibraltar) Jeremy Lopez | (Gibraltar) Lions Gibraltar^{x} |
| | | (Gibraltar) Jason Pusey | Gibraltar United^{x} |

Mons Calpe SC
| IN | | OUT | |
| Player | Team | Player | Team |
| (Gibraltar) Richie Parral | Lions Gibraltar FC^{x} | (Gibraltar) Colin Machin | (Gibraltar) Europa FC |
| (Gibraltar) Ethan Jolley | (Gibraltar) Lincoln Red Imps FC^{x} | (Gibraltar) Kieron Bosano | (Gibraltar) Europa FC |
| (Gibraltar) Max Cottrell | (Gibraltar) Manchester 62 FC | (Spain) Sergio Vazquez | Released |
| (Spain) Manuel Camacho | (Gibraltar) FC Britannia XI | (Gibraltar) Alex Gonzalez | Released |
| (Spain) Jose Luis Otero | (Gibraltar) FC Britannia XI | (Gibraltar) Kyle Bear | Retired |
| (Argentina) Juan Pablo Pereira | (Gibraltar) Glacis United^{x} | (Gibraltar) Sean Mascarenhas | (Gibraltar) FC Olympique 13 |
| (Gibraltar) Tyson Ruiz | (Gibraltar) Manchester 62 FC | (Spain) Francisco Marquez | (Gibraltar) St Joseph's FC |
| (Gibraltar) Alan Parker | Gibraltar United FC | (Spain) Ruben Fernandez Ruiz | (Gibraltar) Europa FC |
| (Gibraltar) Jaydan Parody | (Gibraltar) Lynx FC | (Spain) Francisco Jimenez Ramon | Boca Juniors (Gibraltar) |
| (Spain) Adria Gallego | (United States) Storm FC | (Spain) Salvador Vallejo Ruiz | Boca Juniors (Gibraltar) |
| (Italy) Sacha Funes | (Gibraltar) Glacis United^{x} | (Spain) Rafael Moreno Flores | Boca Juniors (Gibraltar) |
| (Argentina) Leonardo Vela | (United States) Storm FC | (Gibraltar) Kaylan Muscat | (Gibraltar) Angels FC |
| (Italy) Michele Di Piedi | (Venezuela) Metropolitanos | | |
| (England) Reece Placid | (Gibraltar) Bruno's Magpies | | |
| (Spain) Fernando Sanchez Diaz | (Gibraltar) Bruno's Magpies | | |
| (Argentina) Facundo Cascio | (United States) Storm FC | | |
| (Armenia) Jeremy Funes | (England) Guildford City | | |
| (Argentina) Hugo Colace | (Paraguay) Capiatá | | |
| (Brazil) Andre Dos Santos | (Gibraltar) FC Britannia XI | | |
| (Brazil) Renan Bernades | (Gibraltar) FC Britannia XI | | |

St Joseph's FC
| IN | | OUT | |
| Player | Team | Player | Team |
| (Gibraltar) Luke Buxton | (Spain) Real Balompedica Linense | (Spain) Diego Merchan | (Iceland) Huginn |
| (Spain) Jose Felix Romero | (Spain) Algeciras CF | (Equatorial Guinea) Charly Briones | (Spain) Algeciras CF |
| (Spain) Manuel Cantizano | Lions Gibraltar FC | (Spain) Jorge Corpas | (Spain) CD Rincon |
| (Spain) Alberto Jose Del Rio | (Spain) Xerez CD | (Spain) Kevin Bonilla | (Spain) Xerez CD |
| (Spain) Jose Luis Romero | Lions Gibraltar FC | (Spain) Alex Cortijo | (Spain) Arcos CF |
| (Spain) Jesus Moreno | Free transfer | (Gibraltar) Riki Duarte | Lions Gibraltar FC |
| (Spain) Dani Castro | (Spain) Xerez CD | (Gibraltar) Kivan Castle | (Gibraltar) Europa Point |
| (Spain) Sidi Mahamud Buna | (Spain) CD San Roque | (Spain) Alejandro Samaniego | (Finland) FC KTP |
| (Gibraltar) John Paul Duarte | (Gibraltar) Manchester 62 FC | | |
| (Gibraltar) Frank Warwick | Free transfer | | |
| (Spain) Alberto Montaño | (Spain) UD San Pedro | | |
| (Spain) Carlos Sanchez | (Gibraltar) Lynx FC | | |
| (Spain) Francisco Marquez | (Gibraltar) Mons Calpe SC | | |
| (Haiti) Shelby Printemps | (Indonesia) Surabaya United | | |

== Key ==
^{x} Pending official confirmation from club
