= Tercentenary Sports Hall =

Sports hall in Gibraltar

- Interactive map of Tercentenary Sports Hall
- Location: Gibraltar
- Coordinates: 36.149065°N 5.351295°W
- Owner: Government of Gibraltar
- Capacity: 2,000

Tenants
- Gibraltar national futsal team Gibraltar men's national basketball team

Tercentenary Sports Hall is a multi-purpose indoor arena located in Gibraltar. It is located near Gibraltar International Airport, adjacent to Winston Churchill Avenue and the Victoria Stadium.

The venue is primarily used for futsal competitions, although it also serves as a facility for local basketball and volleyball teams. In 2015, it hosted all matches of Group D in the preliminary round of the UEFA Futsal Cup. In 2014 and 2026, it was the venue for the FIBA European Championship for Small Countries, and in 2016 it hosted the FIBA Women's European Championship for Small Countries.

The arena also hosted Group G of the preliminary round of qualification for the UEFA Futsal Euro 2018.

== See also ==
- Gibraltar Futsal First Division
- Gibraltar national futsal team
