= List of football clubs in Gibraltar =

This is a list of football clubs in Gibraltar.

== Gibraltar National League ==
- F.C. Bruno's Magpies
- College 1975 F.C.
- Europa F.C.
- Europa Point F.C.
- Glacis United F.C.
- Lincoln Red Imps F.C.
- Lions Gibraltar F.C.
- Lynx F.C.
- Manchester 62
- Mons Calpe S.C.
- St Joseph's F.C.

== Gibraltar Intermediate League ==
- F.C. Hound Dogs (participating in Intermediate League due to dispensation)
- 11 Intermediate/U-23 teams from the 11 Gibraltar National League teams

== Former Men's Participating Clubs ==
- Angels F.C.
- Boca Gibraltar
- F.C. Britannia XI
- Gibraltar Phoenix F.C.
- Gibraltar United F.C.
- Cannons F.C.
- Gibraltar F.C.
- Gibraltar Pilots F.C.
- Gibraltar Scorpions F.C.
- Laguna F.C.
- F.C. Olympique 13
- Pegasus F.C.
- Prince of Wales F.C.
- Red Imps F.C.
- Shamrock 101 F.C.
- Sporting Club Gibraltar F.C.
- Stan James Athletic F.C.
- Jubilee F.C.
- Albion F.C.
- Exiles F.C.
- Athletic F.C.
- South United
- Royal Sovereign F.C.
- Commander of the Yard F.C.
- Chief Construction F.C.
- Chief Constructor F.C.
- St Theresa's F.C.

== Women's League ==
- Europa Ladies
- Gibraltar Wave F.C.
- Lions Gibraltar Ladies
- Lynx Women F.C.

== Former Women's League Participating Clubs ==
- Gibraltar United F.C.
- Lincoln Ladies
- Manchester 62 Ladies
- St Joseph's
