= 2013–14 Gibraltar Premier Division =

Premier Division
- Season: 2013–14
- Champions: Lincoln; 20th title
- Relegated: Gibraltar Phoenix
- Champions League: Lincoln
- Europa League: College Europa
- Matches: 56
- Goals: 238 (4.25 per match)
- Top goalscorer: John-Paul Duarte (15 goals)
- Biggest home win: Lincoln 16–1 Gibraltar Phoenix (15 February 2014)
- Biggest away win: Gibraltar Phoenix 0–16 Lincoln (8 February 2014)
- Highest scoring: Lincoln 16–1 Gibraltar Phoenix (15 February 2014)
- Longest winning run: 11 games Lincoln
- Longest unbeaten run: 14 games Lincoln
- Longest winless run: 14 games Gibraltar Phoenix
- Longest losing run: 14 games Gibraltar Phoenix
- All statistics correct as of 5 April 2014.

The 2013–14 Gibraltar Premier Division (known as the Argus Insurance Premier Division for sponsorship reasons) is the 115th season of the national amateur football league in Gibraltar since its establishment - the highest level of football in Gibraltar. The league was expanded this season, and will be contested by eight clubs, a requirement for entry into UEFA competitions. The season began on October 7, 2013, with Glacis United defeating Lions Gibraltar 3–2. Lincoln are the defending league champions, having sealed their 11th successive title win in 2012–13.

== Season summary ==
The 2013–14 season of the Gibraltar Premier Division, the first since the GFA's acceptance into UEFA, began on October 7, 2013, with Glacis United defeating Lions Gibraltar 3–2. The two sides had finished level on points the previous season at the bottom of the table but remained in the division thanks to the league's expansion from 6 to 8 teams in order to meet the minimum requirements for entry into UEFA competitions. Reigning champions and heavy favourites Lincoln got off to a slow start, being held 0-0 and 1–1 in their opening fixtures to Lynx and College Europa, respectively. Both sides proved early season surprise packages and occupied the top two places for the majority of the early part of the season. The mid season break saw the first edition of the Gibraltar Premier Cup in which Lincoln came out victorious after defeating Manchester 62 in the final. Following this both sides continued long lasting unbeaten runs to reach the top two positions in the table, with Lincoln yet to suffer defeat as of March 31, 2014.

At the other end of the table, two sides suffered mass exoduses in pre-season and struggled for form as a result. St Joseph's, 2012-13 league runners up and reigning Rock Cup champions, saw themselves in particular trouble while the struggle to keep players meant that newly promoted Gibraltar Phoenix, who failed to pick up a single point in their first 10 games, were left struggling to even field a starting 11 by December. In the March 28 game between Lincoln and College Europa, an explosion caused a floodlight failure with 12 minutes to go and saw the match abandoned at 3–2 to the Red Imps. Because Victoria Stadium is the only current stadium in Gibraltar, evening games the rest of the weekend, including the game between St Joseph's and Glacis United, were postponed. However, daytime games including Lions Gibraltar's 1–0 victory over a much improved Gibraltar Phoenix, were permitted to go ahead. Both Lincoln and College Europa have appealed to replay the abandoned game. On April 2, the final 12 minutes were played out with 4-2 the result. Gibraltar Phoenix were relegated on April 7, 2014, after a 5–0 defeat to Manchester 62, having lost all 12 games of the season up to that point. Lincoln secured their title win with a 4–1 victory over Lions Gibraltar on April 14.

== Teams ==
Location of the stadium which all teams play in

After the 2012–13 season, no teams were relegated due to the expansion of the league. College Europa and Gibraltar Phoenix were promoted from the Second Division as champions and runners up, respectively.

Club	Finishing position 2012–13
College Europa	1st in Gibraltar Second Division (promoted)
Gibraltar Phoenix	2nd in Gibraltar Second Division (promoted)
Glacis United	6th
Lincoln Red Imps	1st (champions)
Lions Gibraltar	5th
Lynx	4th
Manchester 62	3rd
St Joseph's	2nd

=== European qualification ===
This will be the first season of the league since Gibraltar were accepted as full members of UEFA. Gibraltar has been allocated one place in the 2014–15 UEFA Champions League, provided the qualifying club has received a UEFA licence.

=== Personnel and kits ===
Note: Flags indicate national team as has been defined under FIFA eligibility rules. Players may hold more than one non-FIFA nationality.

Team	Manager	Captain	Kit manufacturer	Shirt sponsor
College Europa	(Spain) Manolo Nuñez	(Gibraltar) Dylan Manasco	Nike	Cancer Relief Gibraltar
Gibraltar Phoenix	(Gibraltar) Matt Gore	(Gibraltar) Gary Lowe	Adidas	Digital Corner
Glacis United	(Spain) Javier Sanchez Alfaro		Nike	
Lincoln	(Gibraltar) Mike McElwee	(Gibraltar) Roy Chipolina	Joma	OSG Security
Lions Gibraltar	(Gibraltar) Steve Cummings	(Gibraltar) Jansen Dalli	Errea	Mitsubishi
Lynx	(Gibraltar) Albert Parody		Adidas	Trends
Manchester 62	(Gibraltar) Aaron Asquez	(Gibraltar) Matt Reoch	Joma	CEPSA GIB
St. Joseph's	(Gibraltar) Jerry Aguilera	(Gibraltar) Jerry Aguilera	Joma	

== League table ==
The Europa League qualifying spot was unconfirmed after the cup and league finished. UEFA regulations suggested College Europa as Cup runners-ups. GFA promised the spot to the league runners-up pre-season. Eventually College Europa were awarded the spot.

Pos	Team	Pld	W	D	L	GF	GA	GD	Pts	Qualification or relegation
1	Lincoln (C)	14	11	3	0	66	6	+60	36	Qualification for the Champions League first qualifying round
2	Manchester 62	14	9	3	2	37	10	+27	30	
3	Lynx	14	9	2	3	36	18	+18	29	
4	Europa FC	14	5	4	5	31	20	+11	19	Qualification for the Europa League first qualifying round
5	Glacis United	14	6	1	7	18	32	−14	19	
6	Lions Gibraltar	14	4	2	8	23	33	−10	14	
7	St Joseph's (O)	14	4	1	9	20	29	−9	13	Qualification for the play–off
8	Gibraltar Phoenix (R)	14	0	0	14	9	94	−85	0	Relegation to the Gibraltar Second Division

Source: 2013–14 Football league of Gibraltar
Rules for classification: 1) points; 2) goal difference; 3) number of goals scored.
(C) Champions; (O) Play-off winners; (R) Relegated

== Results ==
Teams in the 2013–14 season will play each other twice, with the season starting on October 7, 2013, and ending on May 7, 2014.

Home \ Away	EFC	GPH	GLA	LIN	LGI	LYN	MAN	SJO
Europa FC		3–1	1–2	1–1	1–1	3–0	1–1	2–4
Gibraltar Phoenix	0–11		2–3	0–16	2–6	0–7	0–5	0–4
Glacis United	0–2	3–0		0–3	3–2	0–2	0–7	1–0
Lincoln	4–2	16–1	4–0		4–1	3–0	1–1	5–0
Lions Gibraltar	1–1	1–0	3–4	0–4		0–2	3–1	3–2
Lynx	3–2	8–2	4–1	0–0	1–0		1–1	3–1
Manchester 62	2–0	4–0	2–1	0–1	4–0	3–2		2–0
St Joseph's	0–1	6–1	0–0	0–4	4–2	2–3	0–3	

Source: Soccerway: Gibraltar Premier Division Table
Legend: Blue = home team win; Yellow = draw; Red = away team win.

== Relegation play-off ==
St Joseph's won and remained in the Premier Division.

18 May 2014
18:00

St Joseph's	2–0	Mons Calpe
Nathan Santos; Bruninho Araújo

Victoria Stadium

== Top goalscorers ==
Rank	Player	Club	Goals
1	(Gibraltar) John-Paul Duarte	Lincoln	15
2	(Gibraltar) George Cabrera	Lincoln	14
2	(Spain) Sergio Ginés	Lynx	14
4	(Argentina) Christian Toncheff	College Europa	10
5	(Gibraltar) Joseph Chipolina	Lincoln	9
6	(Gibraltar) Robert Montovio	College Europa	8
7	(Spain) Tostao	College Europa	7
8	(Gibraltar) Naoufal El Andaloussi	Manchester 62	6
8	(Gibraltar) Liam Clarke	St. Joseph's / Lincoln	6
8	(Gibraltar) Kyle Casciaro	Lincoln	6
8	(Gibraltar) Nathan Santos	St. Joseph's	6
