= 2014 FIBA European Championship for Small Countries =

Tournament details
- Host country: Gibraltar
- Dates: 7–12 July 2014
- Teams: 6 (from 1 confederation)
- Venue: 1 (in 1 host city)

Final positions
- Champions: Andorra (5th title)
- Runners-up: Malta
- Third place: Scotland

Official website
- www.fibaeurope.com

The 2014 FIBA European Championship for Small Countries was the 14th edition of the tournament, formerly known as the Promotion Cup or the FIBA EuroBasket Division C. It was played in the Tercentenary Sports Hall, Gibraltar, from 7 to 12 July 2014.

The draw took place on 1 December 2013, in Freising, Germany. The Championship was won by title defenders, the Andorra national team.

== Participating teams ==
- Andorra
- Gibraltar
- Malta
- San Marino
- Scotland
- Wales

== First round ==
=== Group A ===
Pos	Team	Pld	W	L	PF	PA	PD	Pts	Qualification
1	Andorra	2	2	0	166	95	+71	4	Semifinals
2	San Marino	2	1	1	127	122	+5	3	Quarterfinals
3	Gibraltar (H)	2	0	2	87	163	−76	2	Quarterfinals

Source: FIBA
(H) Hosts

7 July 2014
19:00

Boxscore

Andorra	83–48	Gibraltar
Scoring by quarter: 22–16, 23–12, 11–11, 27–9
Pts: Colom 17; Rebs: Gabriel 9 Asts: Malet, Mofreita 3		Pts: Buxton 16; Rebs: Buxton 15; Asts: three players 2

Tercentenary Sports Hall, Gibraltar
Attendance: 600
Referees: Luigi Lamonica (ITA), Bernard Vassallo (MLT), Andrew Smith (SCO)

8 July 2014
19:00

Boxscore

Gibraltar	39–80	San Marino
Scoring by quarter: 14–21, 3–19, 6–24, 16–16
Pts: Buxton 12; Rebs: Buxton 13; Asts: Buxton 2		Pts: Raschi 16; Rebs: Raschi 12; Asts: Casadei 4

Tercentenary Sports Hall, Gibraltar
Attendance: 300
Referees: Vicente Bultó (ESP), Gavin Williams (WAL), Andrew Smith (SCO)

9 July 2014
19:00

Report

San Marino	47–83	Andorra
Scoring by quarter: 15–14, 14–20, 8–33, 10–16
Pts: Liberti 10; Rebs: Zanotti 8 Asts: Casadei 2		Pts: Casals 20; Rebs: Colom 7 Asts: Fernàndez 4

Tercentenary Sports Hall, Gibraltar
Attendance: 150
Referees: Miguel Ángel Pérez Niz (ESP), Bernard Vassallo (MLT), Andrew Smith (SCO)

=== Group B ===
Pos	Team	Pld	W	L	PF	PA	PD	Pts	Qualification
1	Malta	2	2	0	180	157	+23	4	Semifinals
2	Scotland	2	1	1	172	149	+23	3	Quarterfinals
3	Wales	2	0	2	137	183	−46	2	Quarterfinals

Source: FIBA

7 July 2014
16:15

Boxscore

Malta	87–82 (OT)	Scotland
Scoring by quarter: 23–13, 14–26, 21–14, 14–19, Overtime: 15–10
Pts: Deguara 25; Rebs: Deguara 11; Asts: Schembri 6		Pts: Collins 23; Rebs: Collins 10; Asts: Bunyan 5

Tercentenary Sports Hall, Gibraltar
Attendance: 150
Referees: Miguel Ángel Pérez Niz (ESP), Francis Santos (GIB), Igor Esteve (AND)

8 July 2014
16:30

Boxscore

Scotland	90–62	Wales
Scoring by quarter: 22–12, 29–14, 20–17, 19–19
Pts: Adorian, Cleary 14; Rebs: Cleary 8 Asts: Glass 5		Pts: Pearce 13; Rebs: three players 5 Asts: Seeley 2

Tercentenary Sports Hall, Gibraltar
Attendance: 100
Referees: Luigi Lamonica (ITA), Francis Santos (GIB), Gian Luigi Giancecchi (SMR)

9 July 2014
16:30

Boxscore

Wales	75–93	Malta
Scoring by quarter: 21–23, 20–20, 16–19, 18–31
Pts: Seeley 24; Rebs: Pearce, Williams 7 Asts: Seeley 4		Pts: Jackson 25; Rebs: Deguara 22; Asts: Naudi 4

Tercentenary Sports Hall, Gibraltar
Attendance: 150
Referees: Vicente Bultó (ESP), Gian Luigi Giancecchi (SMR), Igor Esteve (AND)

== Knockout stage ==
Quarterfinals
Scotland	55
Gibraltar	32
San Marino	62
Wales	55

Semifinals
Andorra	84
Scotland	63
Malta	89
San Marino	68
5th–6th
Wales	66
Gibraltar	59

Final match
Andorra	66
Malta	63
Third place match
Scotland	67
San Marino	55

=== Quarterfinals ===
10 July 2014
16:30

San Marino	62–55	Wales
Scoring by quarter: 17–18, 16–11, 17–19, 12–7
Pts: Raschi 13; Rebs: Raschi 13; Asts: Casadei 3		Pts: Cope 14; Rebs: Pearce 9 Asts: Seeley 6

Tercentenary Sports Hall, Gibraltar

10 July 2014
19:00

Boxscore

Scotland	55–32	Gibraltar
Scoring by quarter: 17–6, 11–11, 12–8, 15–7
Pts: Nicol, Reilly 9 Rebs: Nicol 8 Asts: three players 2		Pts: Buxton 17; Rebs: Buxton 8 Asts: Yeats 1

Tercentenary Sports Hall, Gibraltar
Attendance: 300
Referees: Luigi Lamonica (ITA), Gavin Williams (WAL), Igor Esteve (AND)

=== Semifinals ===
11 July 2014
16:30

Boxscore

Malta	89–68	San Marino
Scoring by quarter: 25–21, 24–16, 19–13, 21–18
Pts: Jackson 23; Rebs: Deguara 13; Asts: three players 3		Pts: Gualtieri 14; Rebs: Raschi 6 Asts: Raschi 2

Tercentenary Sports Hall, Gibraltar
Attendance: 150

11 July 2014
19:00

Boxscore

Andorra	84–63	Scotland
Scoring by quarter: 28–19, 19–13, 22–13, 15-18
Pts: Colom 21; Rebs: Casals 10; Asts: Galera 4		Pts: Reilly 15; Rebs: Bunyan, Flockhart 5 Asts: Reilly 2

Tercentenary Sports Hall, Gibraltar
Attendance: 200

=== 5th–6th place game ===
12 July 2014
11:30

Boxscore

Wales	66–59	Gibraltar
Scoring by quarter: 18–12, 13–19, 13–5, 22–23
Pts: Rickwood 21; Rebs: Cope, Pearce 11; Asts: Seeley 5		Pts: Buxton 16; Rebs: Buxton 10; Asts: three players 2

Tercentenary Sports Hall, Gibraltar
Attendance: 200
Referees: Miguel Ángel Pérez Niz (ESP), Gian Luigi Giancecchi (SMR), Igor Esteve (AND)

=== 3rd–4th place game ===
12 July 2014
16:15

Boxscore

Scotland	67–55	San Marino
Scoring by quarter: 19–13, 15–11, 20–8, 13–23
Pts: Collins 21; Rebs: Cleary 17; Asts: Lodge 4		Pts: Raschi 13; Rebs: Biordi 7 Asts: Gualteri, Rossini 3

Tercentenary Sports Hall, Gibraltar
Attendance: 150
Referees: Vicente Bultó (ESP), Bernard Vassallo (MLT), Gavin Williams (WAL)

=== Final ===
12 July 2014
18:45

Boxscore

Andorra	66–63	Malta
Scoring by quarter: 20–19, 21–15, 7–17, 18–12
Pts: Galera 24; Rebs: Galera 7 Asts: Malet 2		Pts: Jackson 19; Rebs: Deguara 14; Asts: Jackson, Vella 2

Tercentenary Sports Hall, Gibraltar
Attendance: 300
Referees: Luigi Lamonica (ITA), Francis Santos (GIB), Andrew Smith (SCO)

== Final standings ==
Rank	Team
1st place, gold medalist(s)	Andorra
2nd place, silver medalist(s)	Malta
3rd place, bronze medalist(s)	Scotland
4	San Marino
5	Wales
6	Gibraltar

2014 FIBA European Championship
for Small Countries winners

Andorra
Fifth title
