= 2014 Rock Cup =

2014 Gibraltar Rock Cup
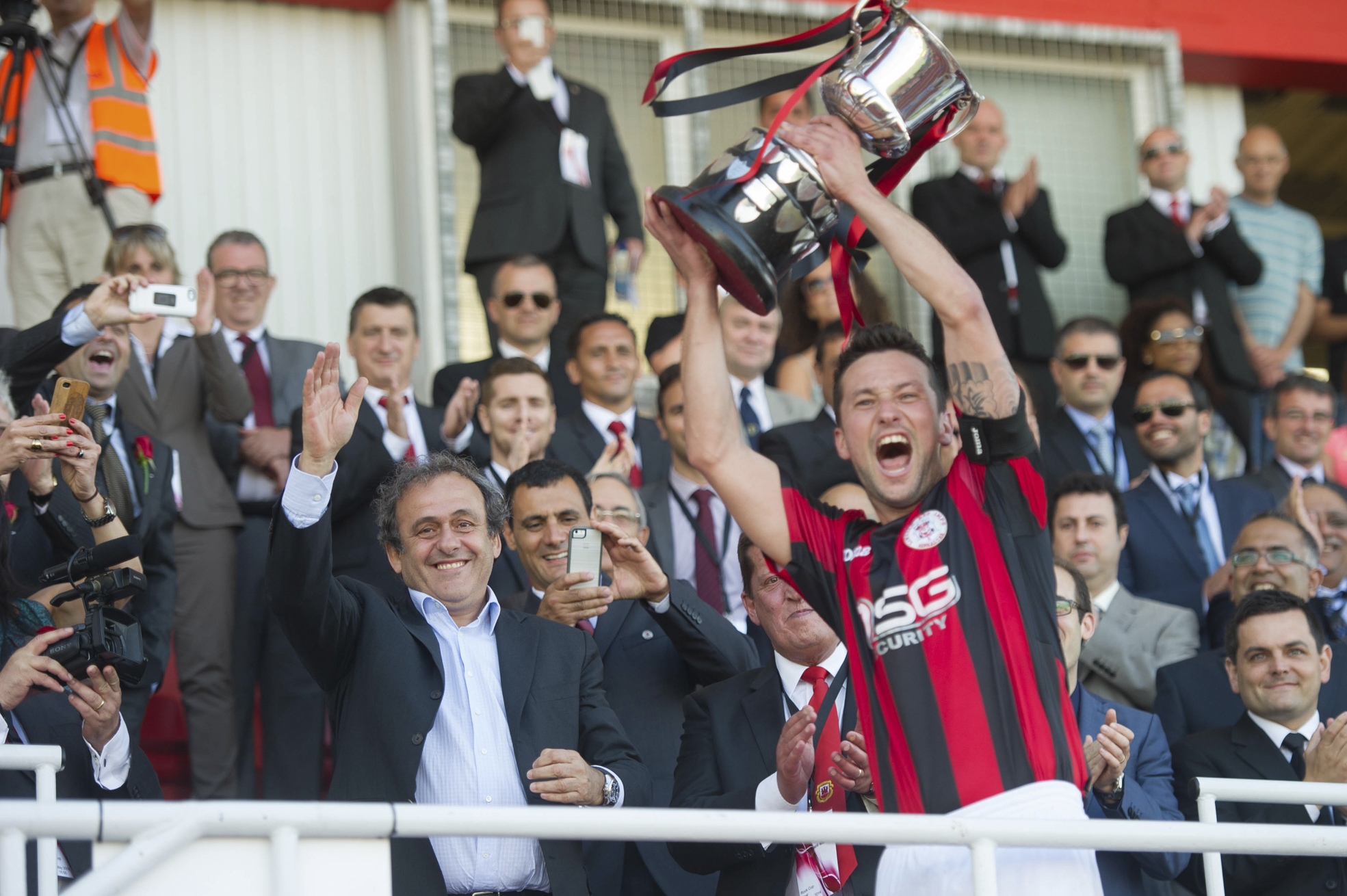

Tournament details
- Country: Gibraltar
- Teams: 21

Final positions
- Champions: Lincoln
- Runners-up: College Europa

Tournament statistics
- Matches played: 20
- Goals scored: 85 (4.25 per match)

The 2014 Rock Cup was the season of Gibraltar's annual main knock-out football tournament. The competition began on 8 January 2014 with the First Round and ended with the final held on 10 May 2014.

The final was won by Lincoln Red Imps, beating College Europa with 1–0. As Lincoln had already been titled league champion, thus qualifying for 2014–15 UEFA Champions League, College Europa qualified for the first qualifying round of the 2014–15 UEFA Europa League.

The draw was held in December 2013 and completely laid out the road to the final with no additional draws needed. All matches were played in the Victoria Stadium.

== First round ==
9 clubs from the Gibraltar Second Division and the Gibraltar national under-15 football team entered this round. These matches were played from 8 to 20 January 2014.

Team 1	Score	Team 2
College Pegasus	1–3	Britannia XI
Cannons	2–2 (9–8 p)	Lions Pilots
Sporting Glacis	0–0 (1–4 p)	Boca Juniors
Mons Calpe	0–1	Red Imps
Hound Dogs	2–2 (4–5 p)	Gibraltar U15

== Second round ==
5 winners from the first round and 11 additional clubs entered this round. These matches were played from 24 to 28 January 2014.

Team 1	Score	Team 2
Britannia XI	2–3	Olympique 13
Gibraltar Phoenix	0–7	Lions Gibraltar
Cannons	3–4	Bruno's Magpies
Lincoln	5–1	St Joseph's
Boca Juniors	1–9	College Europa
Glacis United	7–0	Leo
Red Imps	0–5	Lynx
Gibraltar U15	1–2	Manchester 62

== Quarter-finals ==
Played from 7 to 9 March 2014.

Team 1	Score	Team 2
Olympique 13	0–7	Lions Gibraltar
Bruno's Magpies	0–6	Lincoln
College Europa	4–2	Glacis United
Lynx	1–2	Manchester 62

== Semi-finals ==
Matches were played on 26 and 30 April

Team 1	Score	Team 2
Lions Gibraltar	0–2	Lincoln
College Europa	0–0 (4–2 p)	Manchester 62

== Final ==
10 May 2014

Lincoln	1–0	College Europa
Liam Clarke 90+2'

Victoria Stadium, Gibraltar
Referee: Jason Barceló
