= Gibraltar football league system =

Football league of Gibraltar

The Gibraltar football league system comprised one amateur connected league for football clubs in Gibraltar, the Gibraltar Premier Division, run by the Gibraltar Football Association. Before 2019, there was another amateur league Gibraltar Second Division league, but 2019 was shut down.

Level	Name
1	Gibraltar Premier Division

Since 2019, these leagues have been merged into the Gibraltar National League.
