= Rock Cup =

Association football tournament in Gibraltar

- Founded: 1895
- Region: Gibraltar
- Teams: 12 (2022–23)
- Qualifier for: UEFA Conference League
- Current champions: Lincoln Red Imps (21st title)
- Most championships: Lincoln Red Imps (21 titles)
- 2025–26 Peninsula Rock Cup

The Rock Cup is Gibraltar's premier cup football competition, and is organized annually by the Gibraltar Football Association (GFA).

From 1894/95 Gibraltar's Cup Competition was known as "The Senior Merchant's Cup". In 1935 a new trophy was presented, to the Gibraltar Football Association by the Merchants, Traders and Hotels of Gibraltar and thus the Rock Cup, as it is known today, was born.

The winner of the 2014 Rock Cup was to be the first one to participate in the Europa League, but as Lincoln Red Imps had already been titled league champion, thus qualifying for 2014–15 UEFA Champions League, the losing finalist College Europa qualified for the first qualifying round.

Due to a sponsorship with Gibtelecom, the cup was known as the Gibtelecom Rock Cup from 2018 to 2021.

== Format ==
The Rock Cup is open to all Gibraltar Football Association club members and is played on a straight knock-out basis.

In 2014, then UEFA president Michel Platini presented the trophy to the winners.

== List of winners ==
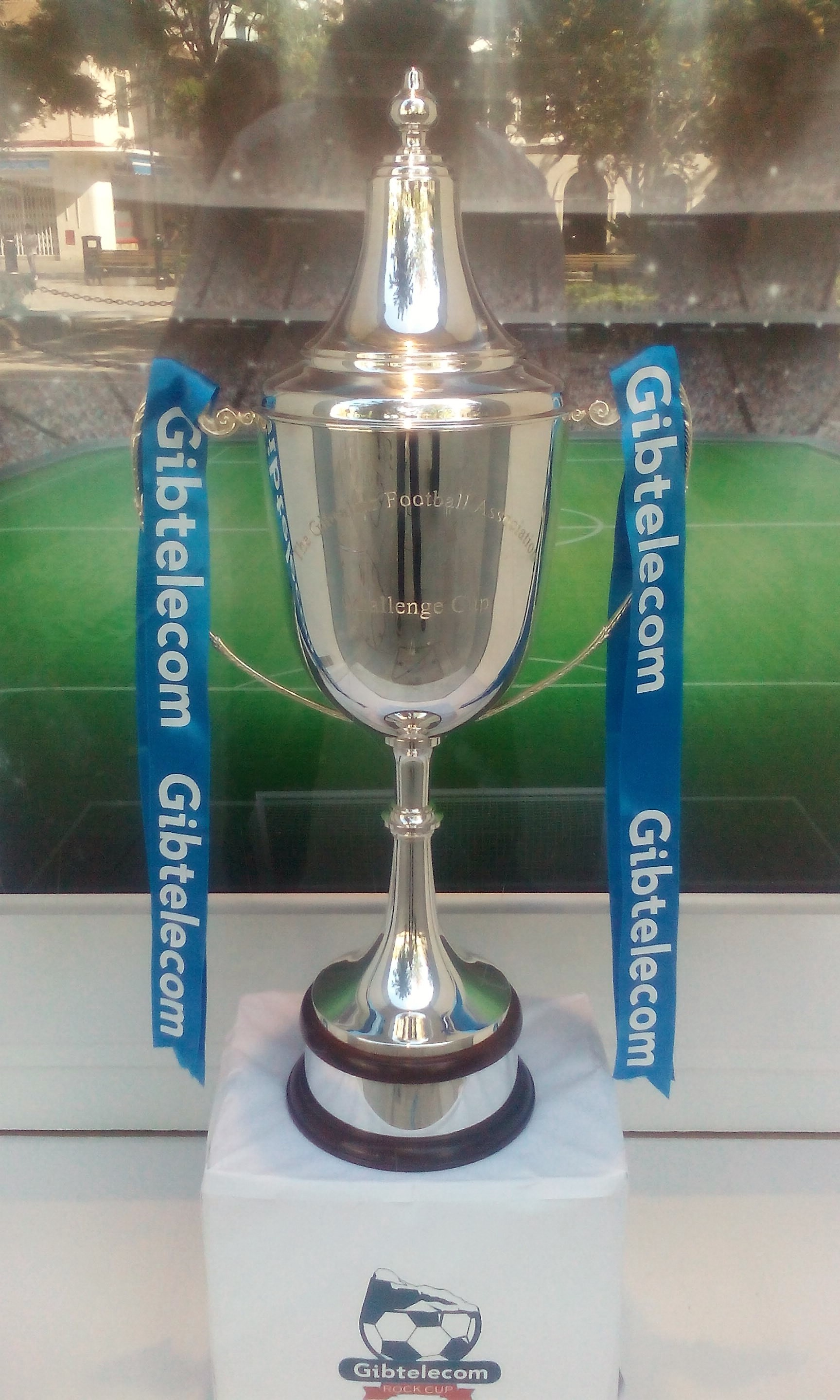
The Rock Cup trophy.

1894–95 to 1935: The Senior Merchant's Cup
- 1894–95 Gibraltar
- 1895–96 Not held
- 1896–97 Jubilee
- 1897–98 Jubilee
- 1898–99 Albion
- 1899–1900 Exiles
- 1900–01 Prince of Wales F.C.
- 1901–02 Exiles
- 1902–03 Prince of Wales F.C.
- 1903–04 Prince of Wales F.C.
- 1904–05 Athletic
- 1905–06 Prince of Wales F.C.
- 1907 til 1933 Not held
- 1933–34 Electricity Department Football Team
- 1934–35 Not held

1935 Onwards - The Rock Cup:

- 1935–36 HMS Hood
- 1936–37 Britannia XI
- 1937–38 Britannia XI
- 1938–39 2nd Battalion The King's Regiment
- 1939–40 Europa
- 1940–41 Not held
- 1941–42 Anti-Aircraft Section, Royal Artillery
- 1942–43 Royal Air Force New Camp
- 1943–44 4th Battalion Royal Scott
- 1944–45 Not held
- 1945–46 Europa
- 1946–47 Gibraltar United
- 1947–48 Britannia XI
- 1948–49 Prince of Wales F.C.
- 1949–50 Europa
- 1950–51 Europa
- 1951–52 Europa
- 1952–53 Not held
- 1953–54 Gibraltar United
- 1954–55 Britannia XI
- 1955–56 Europa
- 1956–57 Britannia XI
- 1957–58 Europa
- 1958–59 Gibraltar United
- 1959–60 Prince of Wales F.C.
- 1960–61 Europa
- 1961–62 Britannia XI
- 1962–63 Gibraltar United
- 1963–64 Gibraltar United
- 1964–65 Gibraltar United
- 1965–66 Gibraltar United
- 1966 til 1973 Not held
- 1973–74 Manchester United Reserve
- 1974–75 Glacis United
- 1975–76 2nd Battalion Royal Green Jackets
- 1976–77 Manchester United
- 1977–78 Not held
- 1978–79 St Jago's
- 1979–80 Manchester United
- 1980–81 Glacis United
- 1981–82 Glacis United
- 1982–83 St Joseph's
- 1983–84 St Joseph's
- 1984–85 St Joseph's
- 1985–86 Lincoln
- 1986–87 St Joseph's
- 1987–88 Royal Air Force Gibraltar
- 1988–89 Lincoln Reliance
- 1989–90 Lincoln
- 1990–91 Not held
- 1991–92 St Joseph's
- 1992–93 Lincoln
- 1993–94 Lincoln
- 1994–95 St Theresa's
- 1995–96 St Joseph's
- 1996–97 Glacis United
- 1997–98 Glacis United
- 1998–99 Gibraltar United
- 1999–2000 Gibraltar United
- 2000–01 Gibraltar United
- 2001–02 Lincoln
- 2002–03 Manchester 62
- 2003–04 Lincoln
- 2004–05 Lincoln
- 2005–06 Lincoln
- 2006–07 Lincoln
- 2007–08 Lincoln
- 2008–09 Lincoln
- 2009–10 Lincoln
- 2010–11 Lincoln
- 2011–12 St Joseph's
- 2013 St Joseph's
- 2014 Lincoln
- 2015 Lincoln
- 2016 Lincoln
- 2017 Europa
- 2017–18 Europa
- 2019 Europa
- 2020 Abandoned due to COVID-19 pandemic
- 2021 Lincoln
- 2021–22 Lincoln
- 2022–23 Bruno's Magpies
- 2023–24 Lincoln
- 2024–25 FCB Magpies
- 2025–26 Lincoln

== Performance by club ==
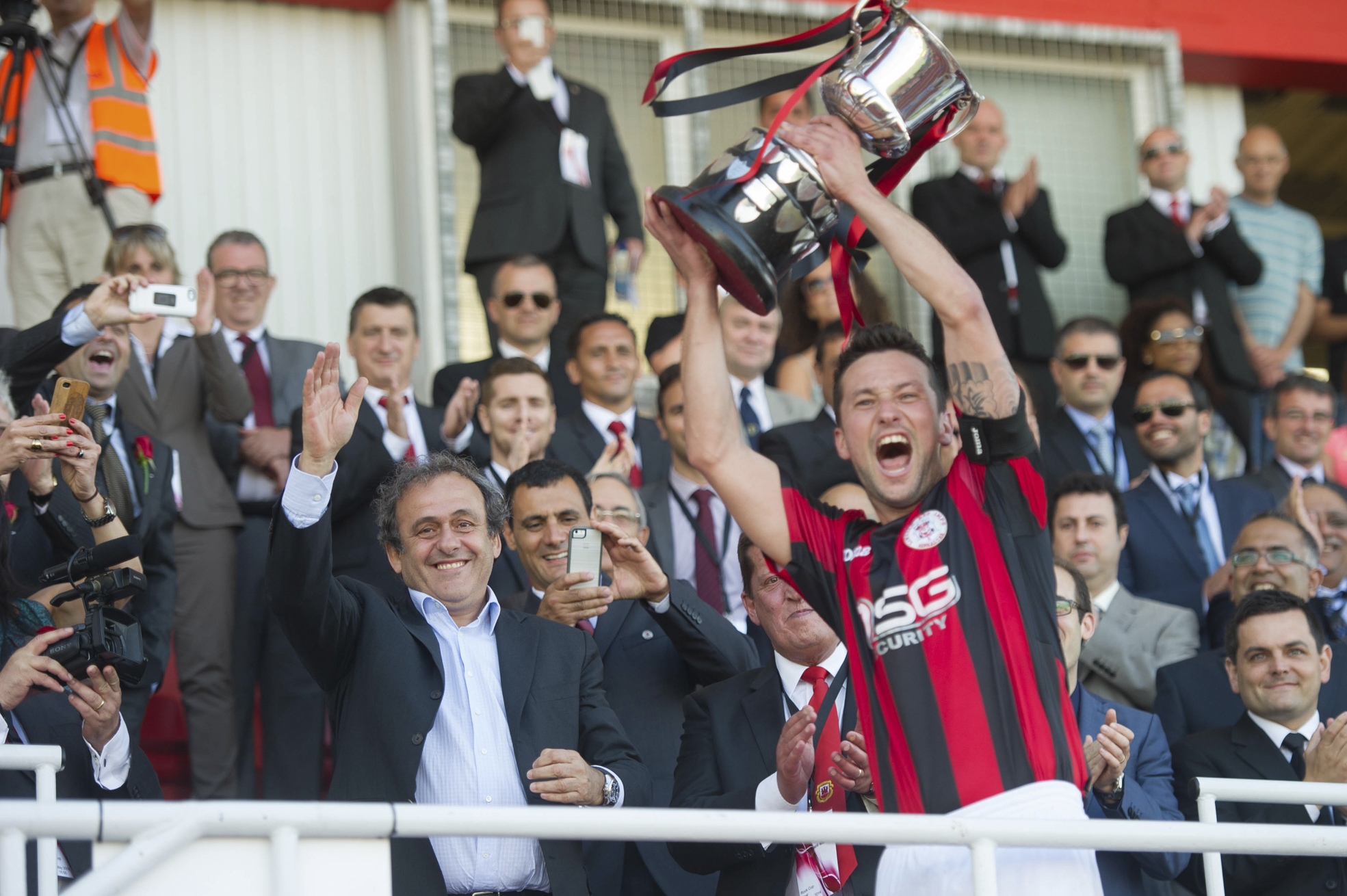
Daniel Duarte lifting the Rock Cup as captain of the Lincoln Red Imps in 2014. Lincoln are the most successful club in the competition with 21 tournament wins.

Team	Titles	Last Title
Lincoln Red Imps	21	2025–26
Europa FC	11	2019
Gibraltar United	10	2000–01
St Joseph's	9	2013
Britannia XI	6	1961–62
Prince of Wales	6	1959–60
Glacis United	5	1997–98
Manchester 62	3	2002–03
Bruno's Magpies	2	2024–25
Exiles	2	1901–02
Jubilee	2	1897–98
St Theresa's	1	1994–95
Royal Air Force Gibraltar	1	1987–88
2nd Battalion Royal Green Jackets	1	1975–76
Manchester United Reserve	1	1973–74
4th Battalion Royal Scots	1	1943–44
Royal Air Force New Camp	1	1942–43
Anti-Aircraft Section, Royal Artillery	1	1941–42
2nd Battalion The King's Regiment	1	1938–39
HMS Hood	1	1935–36
Electricity Department Football Team	1	1933–34
Athletic	1	1904–05
Albion	1	1898–99
Gibraltar	1	1894–95

== See also ==
- Gibraltar Football League
- Gibraltar Premier Division
- Gibraltar Premier Cup
- Pepe Reyes Cup
