= Gibraltar Futsal First Division =

Top Gibraltarian futsal league organized by the Gibraltar Football Association (GFA)

- Organising body: Gibraltar Football Association
- Region: Gibraltar
- Number of clubs: 10 (2021–22 season)
- Level on pyramid: 1
- Relegation to: Gibraltar Futsal Second Division
- Domestic cup(s): Futsal Rock Cup; Louisito Bonavia Trophy
- International cup: UEFA Futsal Champions League
- Current champions: Europa F.C. (1st title)
- Most championships: Lynx F.C. (5 titles)
- Website: Gibraltar FA
- Current: 2021–22 Gibraltar Futsal First Division

The Gibraltar Futsal First Division is the top Gibraltarian futsal league organized by the Gibraltar Football Association (GFA). Since the 2013–14 season, the champion qualifies to enter the preliminary round of the UEFA Futsal Champions League.

Since 2014, the winner qualifies to play in the Louisito Bonavia Trophy (domestic supercup) against the winner of the Futsal Rock Cup (domestic futsal cup).

== History ==
The Gibraltar Scorpions won the 2013–14 season and became the first Gibraltar club to qualify for an international tournament. Since 2014–15 season, Lynx FC started a league domination where the club won five titles in five seasons. In 2018, the league re-organized from 4 divisions to two tiers, including the new 12 team First Division.

== Futsal First Division 2021–22 season ==
Club
Bavaria
Europa Futsal
Hercules
Lions Gibraltar Futsal
Lynx Futsal
Mons Calpe Futsal
South United
Spartans
Stallions
Zoca Bastion

== List of champions ==
Season	Champion	Result	Runner-up
2013–14	Gibraltar Scorpions	(pen. 3–0) 3–3	St.Joseph's South Trade
2014–15	Lynx FC	League	Glacis United
2015–16	Lynx FC	8–2	St.Joseph's South Trade
2016–17	Lynx FC	League	Glacis United
2017–18	Lynx FC	2–1	Gibraltar Phoenix
2018–19	Lynx FC	2–0	Gibraltar Phoenix
2019–20	Not finished due to Covid-19 pandemia. (Note: The league was suspended before play-offs due to Covid-19 pandemia. The GFA decided not to declare a champion. Lynx, who was in the 1st place at the moment of the suspension, was confirmed as the representative of GFA in the 2020-21 UEFA Futsal Champions League.)		
2020–21	Europa F. C.	League	Mons Calpe S. C.

== Titles by club ==
Club	Titles	Seasons in which the club was champion
Lynx F. C.	5	2015, 2016, 2017, 2018, 2019
Europa F. C.	1	2021
Gibraltar Scorpions	1	2014

== Scorers by season ==
Season	Player	Club	Goals
2015–16	(Spain) Manuel Ledesma	Gibraltar Phoenix	52
2016–17	(Spain) Emiliano Fraile	Glacis United	35
2017–18	(Spain) Ezequiel Martín	Lynx FC	56
2018–19	(Spain) Ezequiel Martín	Lynx FC	38
2019–20	(Spain) Ezequiel Martín	Lynx FC	21
2020–21	(Spain) Francisco Díaz	Europa F. C.	23

== See also ==
- Gibraltar national futsal team
- Gibraltar Futsal Second Division
