= 2013–14 League Cup (Gibraltar) =

2013–14 Gibraltar Premier Cup
Tournament details
- Country: Gibraltar
- Dates: 20 December 2013 − 22 February 2014
- Teams: 8

Final positions
- Champions: Lincoln Red Imps
- Runners-up: Manchester 62

Tournament statistics
- Matches played: 15
- Goals scored: 47 (3.13 per match)

The 2013–14 Gibraltar Cup is the inaugural prize of the Gibraltar Premier Cup, a competition for the teams in the Gibraltar Premier Division, the top tier of football in Gibraltar.

== Results ==
=== Group A ===
Pos	Team	Pld	W	D	L	GF	GA	GD	Pts	LIN	MAN	COL	LGI
1	Lincoln	3	2	1	0	8	2	+6	7		3–0		
2	Manchester Utd	3	2	0	1	5	4	+1	6				
3	College Cosmos	3	0	2	1	1	2	−1	2	1–1	0–1		0–0
4	Lions Gibraltar	3	0	1	2	2	8	−6	1	1–4	1–4		

Legend: Blue = home team win; Yellow = draw; Red = away team win.

=== Group B ===
Pos	Team	Pld	W	D	L	GF	GA	GD	Pts	LYN	SJO	GLA	GPH
1	Lynx	3	2	1	0	7	1	+6	7		0–0	3–1	4–0
2	St Joseph's	3	1	2	0	3	0	+3	5			0–0	3–0
3	Glacis United	3	1	1	1	7	3	+4	4				
4	Gibraltar Phoenix	3	0	0	3	0	13	−13	0			0–6	

Legend: Blue = home team win; Yellow = draw; Red = away team win.

=== Semifinals ===
Semifinals played on 1 February 2014

Team 1	Score	Team 2
Lincoln	9–1	St Joseph's
Lynx	0–1	Manchester Utd

=== Final ===
The final was played on 22 February 2014

Team 1	Score	Team 2
Lincoln	3–0	Manchester Utd
