= Gibraltar Scorpions F.C. =

Former association football club in Gibraltar

Gibraltar Scorpions
- Ground: Victoria Stadium, Gibraltar
- Capacity: 5000
- Manager: Joaquin J. Echevarría
- League: Gibraltar Second Division
- Website: www.gibscorpionsfc.com

Gibraltar Scorpions F.C. were a football team from Gibraltar. They played in the Gibraltar Second Division and the Rock Cup. On 1 April 2015 Joaquin J. Echevarría was appointed as the manager for seven years starting in the 2015/2016 season. After losing a number of players towards the end of their first season in the Second Division, the side's promotion challenge failed and the football side folded in order for the club to focus its efforts on its successful futsal side.
