= Alan Arruda =

Brazilian footballer and manager (born 1981)

Personal information
- Full name: Alan Monken Arruda
- Date of birth: September 12, 1981 (age 45)
- Place of birth: Petrópolis, Rio de Janeiro, Brazil
- Height: 1.77 m (5 ft 10 in)
- Positions: Central midfielder; attacking midfielder

Team information
- Current team: Tabasalu JK
- Number: 81

Senior career*
Years	Team	Apps	(Gls)
1990–2000	Serrano	25	(7)
2001–2003	Ferencvárosi TC	21	(4)
2004	Paraíba do Sul	11	(0)
2005/2006	ASV Spratzern	16	(4)
2007–2009	Nõmme Kalju	93	(6)
2010–2014	Atlantis FC	105	(16)
2015–2016	FC Britannia XI	28	(0)
2017	FC Atlantis		
2018	Tabasalu JK		

Managerial career
- 2012–2014: Atlantis FC
- 2015–2016: FC Britannia XI
- 2017: Atlantis FC
- * Club domestic league appearances and goals

Alan Monken Arruda (born September 12, 1981) is a Brazilian professional footballer and coach, who currently is based in Tallinn as a coach for JK Tabasalu of the Esiliiga B.

== Career ==
He joined to Estonian club JK Nõmme Kalju after pay for Serrano Football Club, Ferencváros Torna Club, ASV Spratzern, Paraíba do Sul Fc, Helsinki Diplomat Sports Club and became the team captain of the Meistriliiga team. His former clubs include Serrano Football Club, Ferencvárosi TC and Paraíba do Sul F. C.. Arruda scored his first Meistriliiga goal on March 22, 2008, in the 24th minute free kick in a 0–1 win against FC TVMK. In 2010 Alan Arruda transferred to Finland to play for Atlantis FC, and in 2012 became a player/head coach. He currently plays for FC Britannia XI Gibraltar Premier League club.

=== Position ===
He plays the position of Central or offensive midfielder.

=== Coach ===
Arruda was appointed as head coach by Atlantis FC in May 2012.

== Honours ==
=== Club ===
- JK Nõmme Kalju
  - Estonian Cup
  - Runners Up: 2008–09
