= 2013 Rock Cup =

Football Tournament 2013

Tournament details
- Country: Gibraltar
- Teams: 20

Final positions
- Champions: St Joseph's
- Runners-up: Manchester United

Tournament statistics
- Matches played: 19
- Goals scored: 80 (4.21 per match)

The 2013 Rock Cup started on 16 March 2013 and ended on 1 June 2013.

== First round ==
The matches took place from 16 to 19 March 2013.

Team 1	Score	Team 2
Lynx Reserves	6–1	Cannons
Cosmos College	2–3	Leo Parrilla
Lions Pilots	2–2 (3–5 p)	Pegasus
St Joseph's Reserves	0–3	Gibraltar Phoenix

== Second round ==
The matches took place from 13 to 20 April 2013.

Team 1	Score	Team 2
Gibraltar Phoenix	3–0	Hound Dogs
Lions Gibraltar	2–4	Glacis United
Lynx Reserves	0–3	Lincoln
Manchester United	4–2	Britannia
Gibraltar U-15	1–1 (p)	Leo Parrilla
Lynx	1–2	Sporting
Boca Juniors	1–8	St Joseph's
Pegasus	3–0	Chelsea

== Quarterfinals ==
The matches took place from 11 to 14 May 2013.

Team 1	Score	Team 2
St Joseph's	3–0	Pegasus
Gibraltar Phoenix	0–4	Manchester United
Lincoln	4–0	Sporting
Gibraltar U-15	1–2	Glacis United

== Semifinals ==
The matches took place on 25 May 2013.

Team 1	Score	Team 2
St Joseph's	7–0	Glacis United
Manchester United	1–0	Lincoln

== Final ==
The match took place on 1 June 2013.

Team 1	Score	Team 2
St Joseph's	3–1	Manchester United
