= Gibraltar F.C. =

Former association football club in Gibraltar

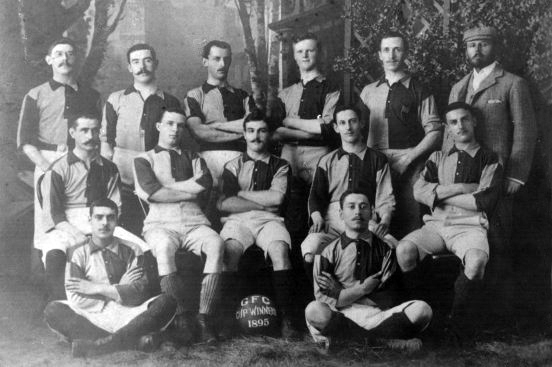
- Gibraltar F.C. in 1895
- Full name: Gibraltar Football Club
- Founded: 1893
- Dissolved: Unknown
- League: Gibraltar Premier Division
Home colours	Away colours	Third colours

Gibraltar Football Club is an association football team based in the British Overseas Territory of Gibraltar. Formed in 1893, it was one of the first civilian football teams to be established in Gibraltar, along with Prince of Wales F.C.; until then football had been the almost exclusive preserve of members of the British military forces.

== History ==
Gibraltar F.C. was formed in November 1893 by cricketers to allow them to continue playing sport during the winter. The club's formation led to a growing interest in football among Gibraltar's civilian population, which in turn led to the founding of the Gibraltar Civilian Football Association.

When the Gibraltar Football League was formed in 1895, Gibraltar F.C. became the inaugural winners of the new league. Gibraltar F.C. then failed to win the league again until the 1923–24 season following Prince of Wales F.C. who had won the three previous seasons. In addition to winning the league in 1895, Gibraltar F.C. were also recorded as having won the inaugural Merchants Cup however there are conflicting records of this with other records claiming that Jubilee F.C. won the Merchants Cup by beating Gibraltar F.C. in the final.

Gibraltar F.C. had also played matches against teams from outside Gibraltar. In 1914, they played a match against Spanish team Betis.

While Gibraltar F.C.'s men's team have ceased to compete in the Gibraltar Football League, Gibraltar F.C. Ladies continue to maintain a presence in the women's leagues in Gibraltar, winning the women's league as recently as 2011.

== Honours ==
- Gibraltar Premier Division
  - Winners (2): 1895–96, 1923–24
- Rock Cup
  - Winners (1): 1894–95
