= Cristian Toncheff =

Argentinean footballer (born 1982)

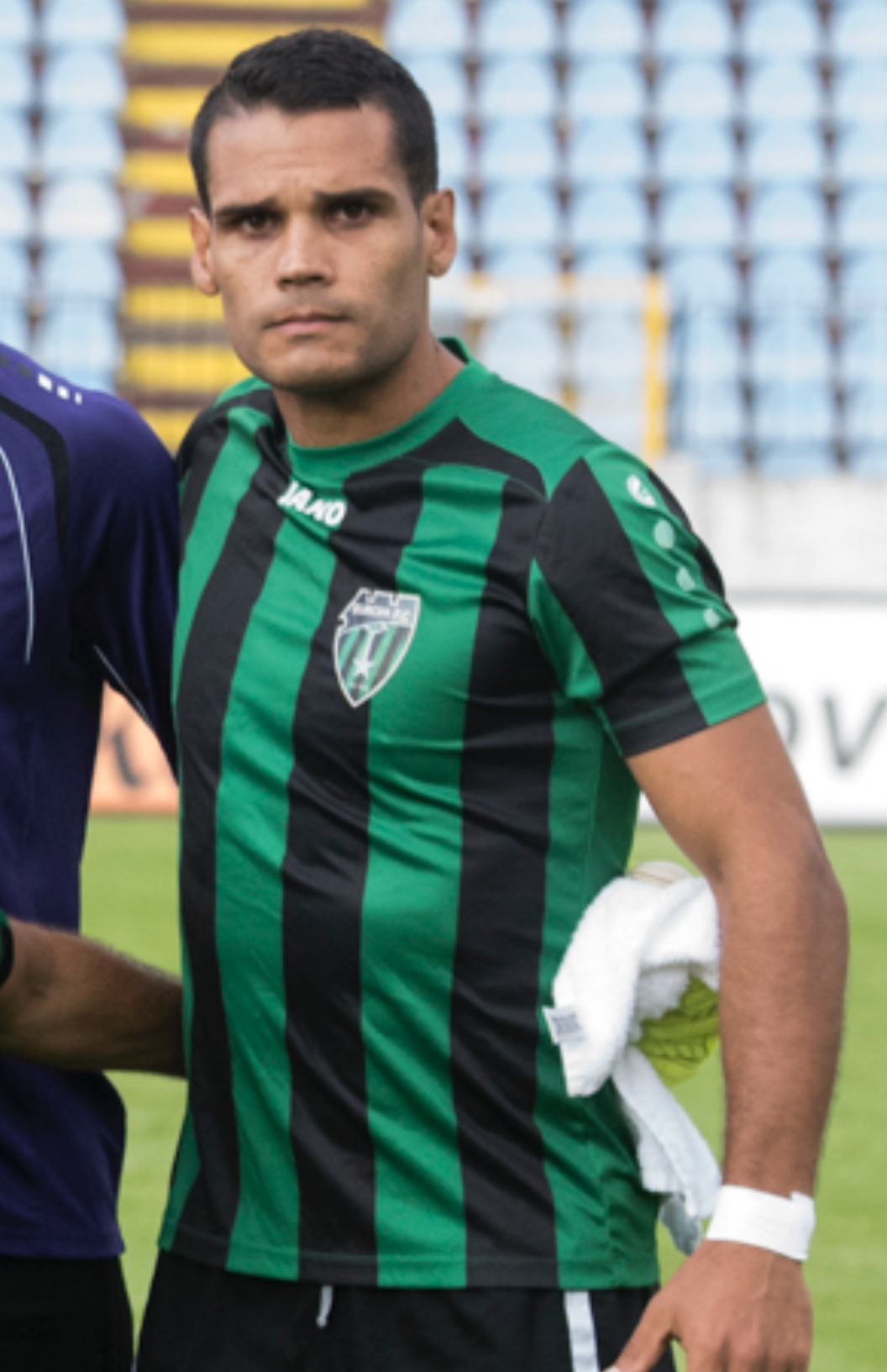

Personal information
- Full name: Cristian Alejandro Toncheff Ferberovich
- Date of birth: 25 March 1982 (age 44)
- Place of birth: Sáenz Peña, Chaco, Argentina
- Positions: Midfielder; striker

Team information
- Current team: Mons Calpe
- Number: 24

Youth career
- Huracán Corrientes
- –2003: Boca Juniors

Senior career*
Years	Team	Apps	(Gls)
2003–2005	Boca Juniors	0	(0)
2005–2006	Deportivo Morón	14	(2)
2006–2007	Club Atlético Colegiales	8	(1)
2007	San Martín de Mendoza	5	(0)
2007–2009	Peñarroya CF		
2009–2010	CD Azuaga	35	(33)
2010	GCE Villaralbo	8	(1)
2010–2011	CD Azuaga	23	(20)
2011–2012	CF Gimnástico Alcázar	28	(14)
2012–2013	GCE Villaralbo	15	(4)
2013–2015	Europa	32	(24)
2015–2017	Manchester 62	34	(20)
2017–2018	Bahrain SC		(5)
2018–2019	Manchester 62	15	(4)
2019–2020	Fgura United	18	(5)
2020–2021	Belmezano	22	(11)
2021–2022	CF Adra	28	(8)
2022–	Mons Calpe	4	(1)
- * Club domestic league appearances and goals as of 4 December 2022

Cristian Alejandro Toncheff Ferberovich (born 25 March 1982) is an Argentine former professional footballer. He was in the UEFA one of Europe's top scorers in 2014 and also one of The most efficient scorers in Europe in 2015. He is currently the Technical Director of the AFC Chindia Târgoviște segunda división Rumana. Sponsorship of FC Barcelona.

== Career ==
Starting his career in Club Atlético Huracan de Corrientes, and subsequently had a brief stint with the Boca Juniors . Toncheff spent the majority of his career in the Argentine lower leagues where at the age of 19 he was promoted by Victor( Tano) Riggio as a professional soccer player in the Atlético Club San Martín de Mendoza 2001 (Nacional "B") and his steps through the Club Deportivo Moron and Club Atlético Colegiales before a move to Europe in 2007.

When he arrived in Spain he played in the 1°Andaluza Córdoba for the Peñarroya CF. In the 2009/10 season he arrived at the Club Deportivo Azuaga where he scores the stratospheric figure of 54 goals in 58 games completing two seasons and culminates with promotions that take the club back to the top of its history. The press echoed the Argentine star Messi's shadow in Azuaga And he won the affection of the fans who nicknamed him as Goal Animal. In the 2011/12 season he began his journey through national categories in Spain as well as in the 3° división Playing for Gimnastico de Alcázar being one of the top scorers and filmmakers of the team and category. He was sought the following season by the Albacete Balompie FC as a Proposal, although he ends up signing that summer to Union Balompedica Conquense ( Toncheff signs for Conquense).

In 2013 he moved to Gibraltar to sign for Europa FC and Manchester 62 FC quickly established himself as a prolific scorer, in 2014 and 2015, playing previous phases of UEFA Europa League He managed to be one of the most efficient footballers in Europe, along with Fernando Cavenaghi, Robert Lewandoski Pierre Emerick Aubameyang Zlatan Ibrahimovic and Neymar among others. Also was the first Argentine footballer to play in the Bahraini Premier League becoming one of the top 10 scorers in the 2016/17 season when he joined Bahrain SC in 2017. He has also enjoyed a career in beach soccer. becoming champion of Andalusia with the Cordoba beach soccer team.

Coaching career

He began his first steps in the 2007/08 season with the children's team of the Peñarroya CF helping the development of some players who signed for the youth team of Córdoba Juvenil.

When moving to Gibraltar He continues his steps as a trainer in the dual role of player and coach of the youth academy of the Manchester 62 FC Gibraltar. In the 2019/20 season he joins the Fgura United FC Malta where he was offered the management of the team under 19 and where he obtained his first title Y ascenso as a coach The Argentine footballer who debuts with a title as a coach. Season 2020/21 returns to Spain to continue in the Cadete team of Peñarroya CF and U9, U12 of AD Adra. He is currently the Technical Director of AFC Chindia Târgoviște. After his time at Barça Academy
