= Luigi Lamonica =

Italian basketball referee (born 1965)

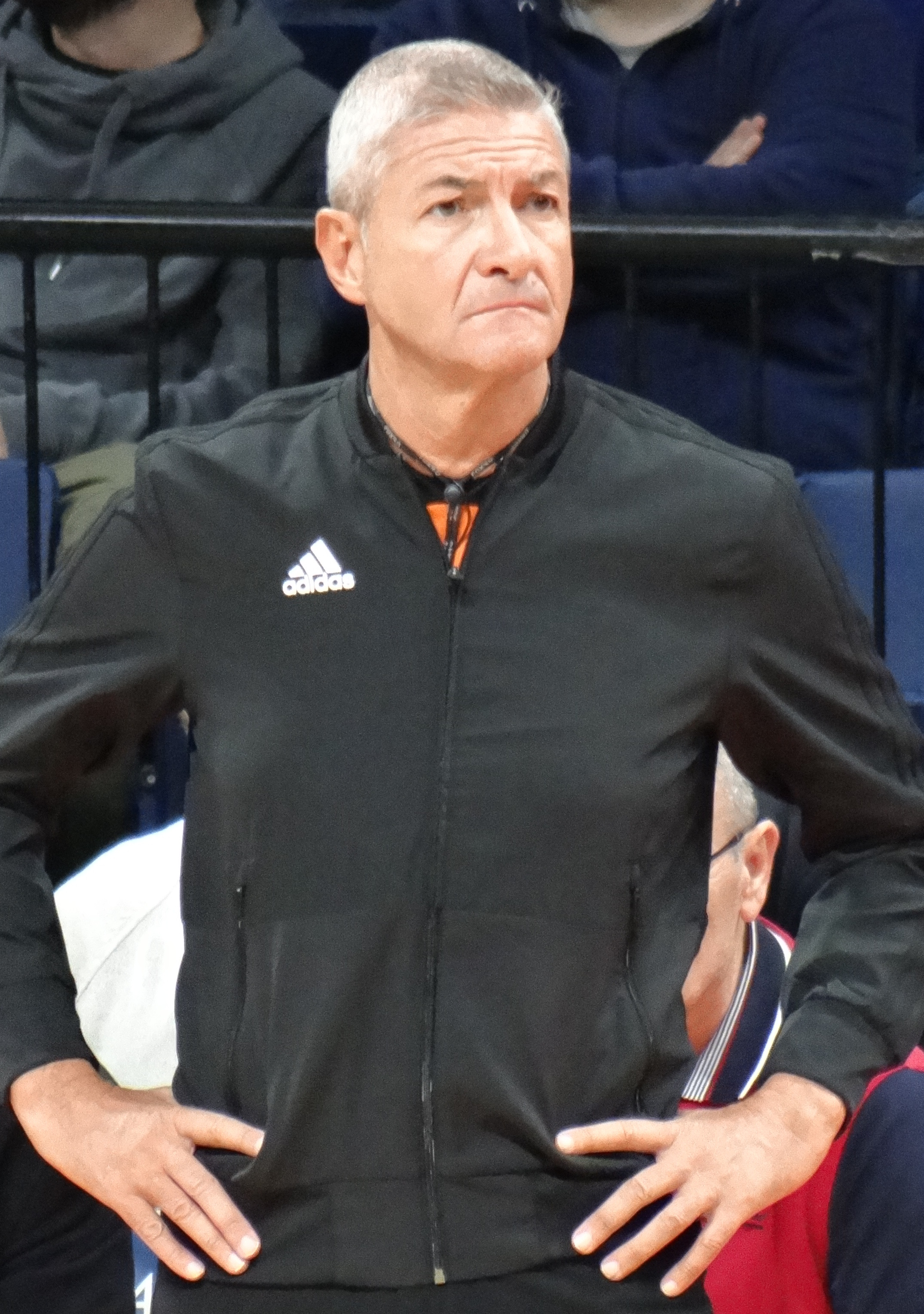
- Lamonica in 2019

Personal information
- Born: 18 December 1965 (age 60) Pescara, Italy

Career information
- Position: Referee
- Officiating career: 1979–present

Career highlights
- FIBA international referee (1996–2022); EuroLeague referee (2001–2022); Officiated at Olympic Games (2008, 2012); Officiated at FIBA World Cups (2010, 2014); EuroLeague Final Four referee (10 appearances); Cavaliere — Order of Merit of the Italian Republic (2019)

Luigi Lamonica (born 18 December 1965) is an Italian former professional basketball referee, who had a long international career and was considered as one of Europe's most experienced officials, having worked at the EuroLeague, multiple FIBA World Cups and two Olympic Games.

== Career ==
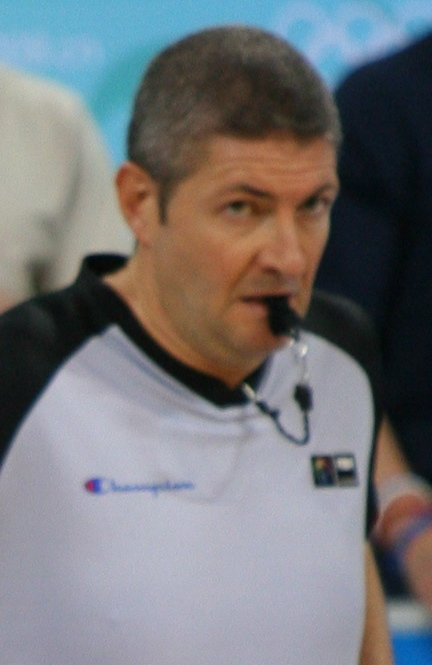
Lamonica in 2008

Lamonica gained his FIBA international licence in 1996 and steadily became a regular choice for FIBA and Euroleague fixtures. He officiated at the 2008 Beijing Olympic Games and the 2012 London Olympic Games, and took part in the 2010 FIBA World Championship and the 2014 FIBA World Cup, among other major events.

Lamonica was active in Euroleague Basketball competitions for more than two decades and was selected for numerous EuroLeague Final Four tournaments — his Final Four appearances include his first in Bologna in 2002 and his tenth in Belgrade in 2022, after which he announced his retirement from officiating at that level.

Lamonica is widely regarded as one of the most important Italian and European referees of his generation for both his longevity at the top level and his involvement in referee education and public discussion about officiating standards. Even after retiring, he remains involved in seminars and mentoring younger officials.

== Honours and publications ==
- On 2 June 2019, Lamonica was made a Cavaliere (Knight) of the Order of Merit of the Italian Republic for his sporting merits.
- Lamonica is the author of the book Decidere. Fischi e fiaschi: olimpici, mondiali ed europei di un arbitro di basket (CARSA, 2011), a collection of diaries and reflections from his international experiences.
