= Brian Perez =

Gibraltarian footballer

Personal information
- Full name: Brian Perez
- Date of birth: 16 September 1986 (age 40)
- Place of birth: Gibraltar
- Height: 1.75 m (5 ft 9 in)
- Position: Midfielder

Team information
- Current team: Mons Calpe
- Number: 11

Youth career
- 2000–2003: Lincoln Red Imps

Senior career*
Years	Team	Apps	(Gls)
2003–2013	Lincoln Red Imps (pre-UEFA)		
2013–2015	Lincoln Red Imps	10	(0)
2015–2017	Manchester 62	8	(0)
2019–2021	Bruno's Magpies	12	(2)
2024–2025	Lions Gibraltar	11	(0)
2025–	Mons Calpe	6	(0)

International career^{‡}
2014–2015	Gibraltar	6	(0)
- * Club domestic league appearances and goals as of 12 December 2025 (UTC+1) ‡ National team caps and goals as of 10 November 2015

Brian Perez (born 16 September 1986) is a Gibraltarian footballer who plays for Gibraltar Football League side Mons Calpe and the Gibraltar national team, where he plays as a midfielder.

== International career ==
On 7 September 2014, Perez made his international début for Gibraltar in a UEFA Euro 2016 Group D qualifying match against Poland with Gibraltar losing 7-0.

=== International statistics ===
As of 7 September 2014.

National team	Season	Apps	Goals
Gibraltar	2014	4	0
Gibraltar	2015	2	0
Total		6	0

== Personal life ==
Perez works for an Electrical Department in Gibraltar.
