= 2011–12 Gibraltar Premier Division =

Premier Division
- Season: 2011–12
- Champions: Lincoln Red Imps
- Relegated: SJ Athletic Corinthians
- Matches played: 60
- Goals scored: 257 (4.28 per match)
- Biggest home win: Lincoln Red Imps 8-2 SJ Athletic Corinthians; Glacis United 8-2 SJ Athletic Corinthians
- Biggest away win: SJ Athletic Corinthians 0-11 Lincoln Red Imps
- Highest scoring: SJ Athletic Corinthians 1-11 St Joseph's

The 2011–12 Gibraltar Premier Division was the 113th season of the national football league in Gibraltar since its establishment - the highest level of football in Gibraltar. It was contested by six clubs - all of which are amateur. The season began on 8 October 2011 and ended on 31 March 2012. Lincoln Red Imps were the defending champions, and successfully defended their title.

== Participating teams ==
- Glacis United
- Lincoln
- Lions Gibraltar
- SJ Athletic Corinthians
- St Joseph's
- Manchester United

== League table ==
Pos	Team	Pld	W	D	L	GF	GA	GD	Pts
1	Lincoln (C)	20	17	3	0	82	18	+64	54
2	St Joseph's	20	10	8	2	54	23	+31	38
3	Manchester United	20	9	4	7	35	31	+4	31
4	Glacis United	20	7	4	9	43	43	0	25
5	Lions Gibraltar	20	4	6	10	28	40	−12	18
6	SJ Athletic Corinthians	20	0	1	19	15	102	−87	1

Source: 2011–12 Football league of Gibraltar
Rules for classification: 1) points; 2) goal difference; 3) number of goals scored.
(C) Champions

== Results ==
Each team played every other team four times, for a total of 20 matches.

=== Matches 1–10 ===
Home \ Away	GLA	LIN	LGI	MAN	SAC	SJO
Glacis United		2–3	2–2	0–3	4–0	1–3
Lincoln	4–0		1–1	4–1	7–1	2–2
Lions Gibraltar	1–1	0–4		0–3	2–1	1–2
Manchester United	2–1	0–4	1–1		6–1	0–2
SJ Athletic Corinthians	0–3	1–6	1–1	0–3		1–6
St Joseph's	1–1	0–2	1–0	1–1	4–2	

Source: 2011–12 Football league of Gibraltar
Legend: Blue = home team win; Yellow = draw; Red = away team win.

=== Matches 11–20 ===
Home \ Away	GLA	LIN	LGI	MAN	SAC	SJO
Glacis United		2–3	3–2	2–3	8–2	3–3
Lincoln	3–0		3–0	4–1	8–2	3–3
Lions Gibraltar	2–3	1–6		3–1	7–0	1–1
Manchester United	2–3	0–2	1–0		3–1	1–1
SJ Athletic Corinthians	0–4	0–11	1–3	0–2		1–11
St Joseph's	4–0	1–2	4–0	1–1	3–0	

Source: 2011–12 Football league of Gibraltar
Legend: Blue = home team win; Yellow = draw; Red = away team win.
