= Prince of Wales F.C. =

Former association football club in Gibraltar

- Full name: Prince of Wales Football Club
- Founded: 1892 (Veterans team reformed 2023)
- Dissolved: 1953
- League: ShieldPlay Veterans League
- 2025–26: 2nd
Home colours	Away colours

Prince of Wales Football Club was a Gibraltarian association football club. It had been founded by 1892 as one of the first civilian football clubs in Gibraltar. Although no longer in existence, up until 2014 it held the record for the most national championships in Gibraltar.

== History ==
Football in Gibraltar was initially played only by members of the British military forces stationed there. Prince of Wales F.C. had been established by 1892 (Note: Sources are divided as to whether the club was known to be in existence in 1892, or was actually founded that year.) by Gibraltar citizens as one of the first football club for civilians as opposed to the military-only clubs that existed at the time. Two more civilian clubs were founded in 1893, Gibraltar F.C. and Jubilee F.C. Interest in the sport became strong enough that the Gibraltar Civilian Football Association was founded in 1895, and the first national football championship, the Merchants Cup, took place that year.

In 1907, the Gibraltar Football League was established, beginning with eight teams, and Prince of Wales F.C., having already won several championships, were the inaugural league winners. Prince of Wales were national champions nineteen times, including seven of eight consecutive Gibraltar Football League seasons from 1920–21 to 1927–28. Their league championships record was eventually overtaken, however, and is now held by Lincoln Red Imps F.C., which as of 2016 has won 22 in all, including the past fourteen in a row. During the Second World War, most football played in Gibraltar focussed on matches between Prince of Wales F.C. and Britannia F.C. Prince of Wales F.C. won the Rock Cup, Gibraltar's national cup competition, in 1949. Their final League championship victory was in 1953. The club later disbanded.

In 2023, the Prince of Wales name was revived for a veteran's football team, winning the John Shephard Memorial Cup ahead of a new organized Veterans League.

== Honours ==
- Gibraltar Premier Division
  - Winners (19): 1900–01, 1902–03, 1903–04, 1905–06, 1908–09, 1913–14, 1916–17, 1918–19, 1920–21, 1921–22, 1922–23, 1924–25, 1925–26, 1926–27, 1927–28, 1930–31, 1938–39, 1939–40, 1952–53
- Rock Cup
  - Winners (6): 1900–01, 1902–03, 1903–04, 1905–06, 1948–49, 1959–60
