= F.C. Britannia XI =

Futsal club in Gibraltar

Britannia XI
- Full name: Football Club Britannia XI
- Nickname: Britannia
- Founded: 1907 (reformed 2009, 2023 Veterans)
- Ground: Victoria Stadium
- Chairman: David Neish
- League: Veterans ShieldPlay League
- 2025–26: 6th
Home colours	Away colours

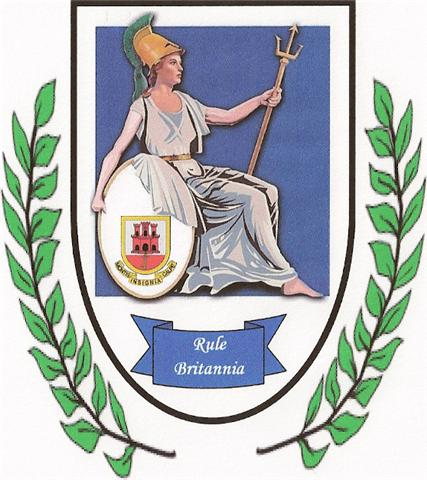
Old logo

F. C. Britannia XI is a football club from Gibraltar, which currently plays in the Gibraltar Veterans ShieldPlay League. Until 2016, the club also operated an association football team who played in the Gibraltar Premier Division until its relegation and resignation at the end of the 2015–16 season. Their futsal team continued operating until 2021. The club, like all others in the territory, play at the Victoria Stadium on Winston Churchill Avenue.

== History ==
The club was previously known as Britannia FC and was previously one of the more dominant sides in Gibraltar, winning several championships in the 1950s, until going into administration and regrouping under its current name in 2009. In 2014 they secured promotion back to the Premier Division after winning the Second Division title. Their first season saw them avoid relegation due to the league's expansion. The club began their second season in the top-flight well under Alan Arruda, being third for the majority of the first half of the season. However, his resignation in early 2016, coupled with the departure of key players, saw them plummet down the league and finish in 9th, meaning they had to participate in a play-off to determine their fate. After losing their play-off to Mons Calpe, they resigned from the league. Britannia returned to football in 2023, joining the Veterans ShieldPlay League for retired players.

== Futsal ==
Britannia launched their futsal team in 2015, however, after resigning from the football league, the club remained inactive for a year. In 2017, the club relaunched its futsal team, and joined the Gibraltar Futsal Third Division. In 2018, they joined the new-look First Division, after the leagues were rebranded and merged into two tiers, the Premier Division and the First Division.

== Current futsal squad ==
Note: Flags indicate national team as defined under FIFA eligibility rules; some limited exceptions apply. Players may hold more than one non-FIFA nationality.

No.	Pos.	Nation	Player
1	GK	GIB	Timothy Hermida
3	DF	GIB	Jonathan Field
4	DF	GIB	Adam Golt
5	MF	GIB	Kieron Williams
6	FW	IRL	Adam Barnes
7		GIB	David Neish (captain)
8	FW	ENG	Martin Lobb
10	FW	GIB	Phil Reyes
12	MF	GIB	Liam Victor

No.	Pos.	Nation	Player
13	MF	GIB	Luke Izzatt
14	FW	GIB	Daniel Goncalves
16	FW	IRL	Ekrem Yavuz
17	FW	ESP	Emilio Crespo
18	FW	GIB	Samir Omari
20	GK	GIB	James Corbacho
—		GIB	Roy Balestrino
—		GIB	Shaun Fernandez
—	DF	GIB	James Watson

== Stadium ==
Victoria Stadium is a multi-purpose stadium in Gibraltar. It is currently used mostly for football matches and holds about 5,000 people. It is located close to the Gibraltar Airport just off Winston Churchill Avenue. It was named after the wife of Gibraltarian philanthropist John Mackintosh.

== Honours ==
- Gibraltar Premier Division
  - Champions (14): 1907–08, 1911–12, 1912–13, 1917–18, 1919–20, 1936–37, 1940–41, 1954–55, 1955–56, 1956–57, 1957–58, 1958–59, 1960–61, 1962–63
- Gibraltar Second Division
  - Champions (1): 2013–14
- Rock Cup
  - Winners (6): 1936–37, 1937–38, 1947–48, 1954–55, 1956–57, 1961–62

== Kit suppliers ==
- (Germany) Adidas (2012–2014)
- (Spain) Joma (2014–2016)

== See also ==
- Football in Gibraltar
- Gibraltar Football Association
- List of football clubs in Gibraltar
