= Red Imps F.C. =

Former association football club in Gibraltar

Red Imps
- Ground: Victoria Stadium, Gibraltar
- Capacity: 5000
- League: Gibraltar Second Division

Red Imps F.C. was a football team from Gibraltar, that formed the reserve team of Lincoln Red Imps. They last played at senior level in the 2015–16 Gibraltar Second Division, leaving the league when reserve teams were banned from entering senior divisions. From 2019 to 2026, they played as Lincoln Red Imps U23 in the Gibraltar Intermediate League before reverting to Lincoln Red Imps Reserves in 2026.
