= Gibraltar Premier Cup =

- Founded: 2013
- Region: Gibraltar
- Teams: 8
- Most championships: Lincoln Red Imps; College Europa (1 title)
- 2014–15 Gibraltar Premier Cup

The Gibraltar Premier Cup, also known as the Gibraltar Senior Cup, was an association football league cup in Gibraltar established in 2013 for the 8 teams that compose the Gibraltar Premier Division. It was created to coincide with the new league structure and the Gibraltar Football Association's admittance to UEFA in May 2013. With the Premier League expanding to ten teams in 2015, future Premier Cups will consist of ten teams.

== Competition Structure ==
In the first two years of its existence, the first round of the competition saw the 8 Premier Division teams divided into 2 groups of four, where each side played each other once. The top two sides from each group progressed to the semi-finals where the winners of each group faced the runners-up of the other, before the two winners met in the final.

With the expansion of the Premier League in 2015, the Premier Cup was expected to be changed to knockout format in order to reduce the number of games played by each team. However, the 2015–16 version of the tournament was not played.

== Tournament finals ==
Year	Winner	Score	Runner-up
2013–14	Lincoln Red Imps	3–0	Manchester 62
2014–15	College Europa	2–1 (a.e.t.)	St Joseph's
