= Victoria Stadium, Gibraltar =

Football stadium in Gibraltar

Victoria Stadium
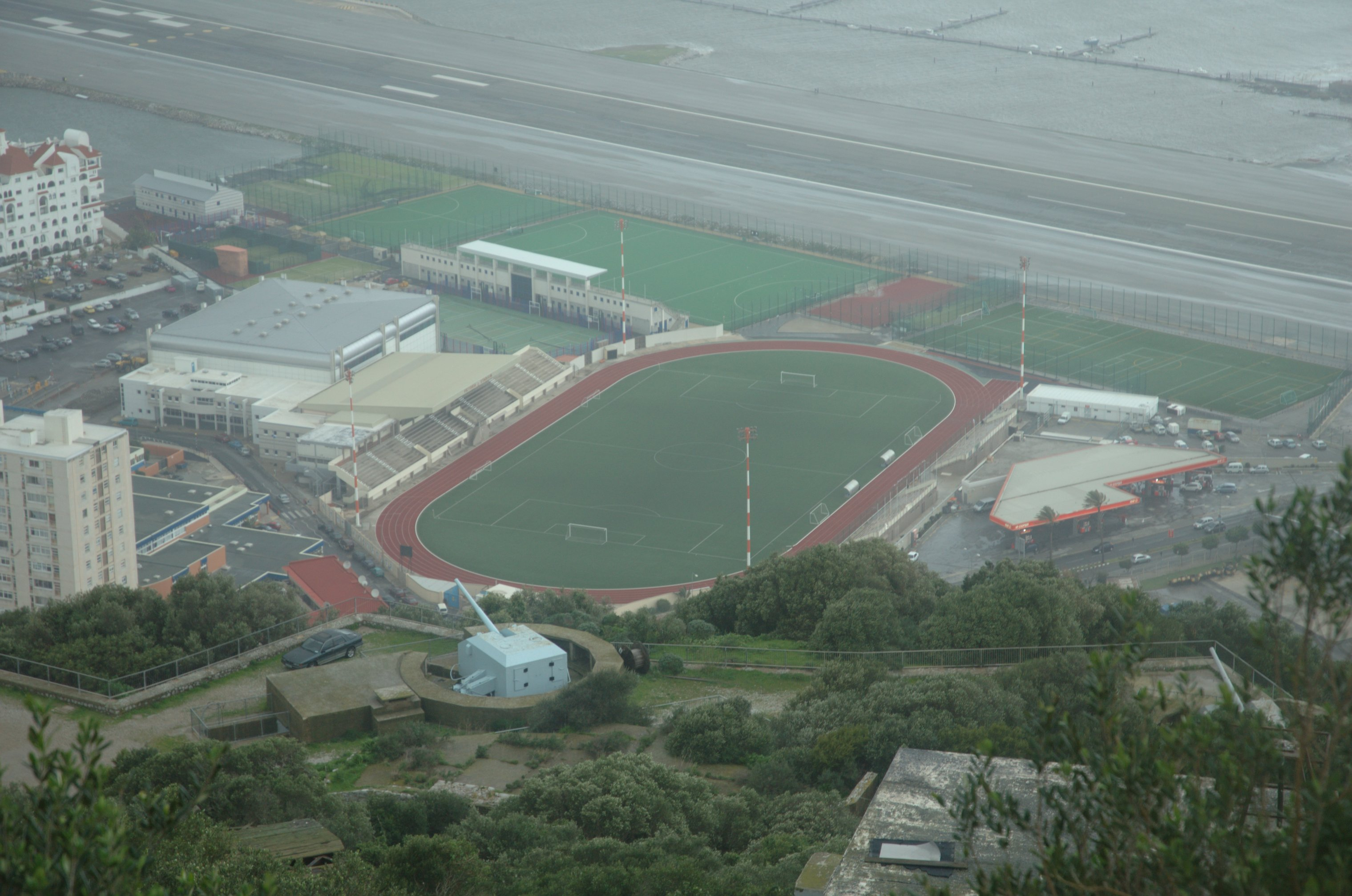
- Aerial view of Victoria Stadium.
- Interactive map of Victoria Stadium
- Location: Gibraltar
- Coordinates: 36°8′58″N 5°21′1″W
- Owner: Gibraltar Football Association (2017–Present)
- Operator: Gibraltar Sports and Leisure Authority (GSLA)
- Capacity: 2,300
- Surface: Artificial turf

Construction
- Opened: 1926 (British Military use only); 1970 (Incl. Civilian Use)
- Renovated: 1991; 2025–

Tenants
- Gibraltar national football team All Gibraltar football clubs Gibraltar national rugby union team (2013–2018)

Victoria Stadium is a multi-purpose stadium in Gibraltar. It is currently used mostly for football matches, but also hosts the annual Gibraltar Music Festival. It is located close to Gibraltar Airport just off Winston Churchill Avenue. It was named after the wife of Gibraltarian philanthropist John Mackintosh.

== History ==
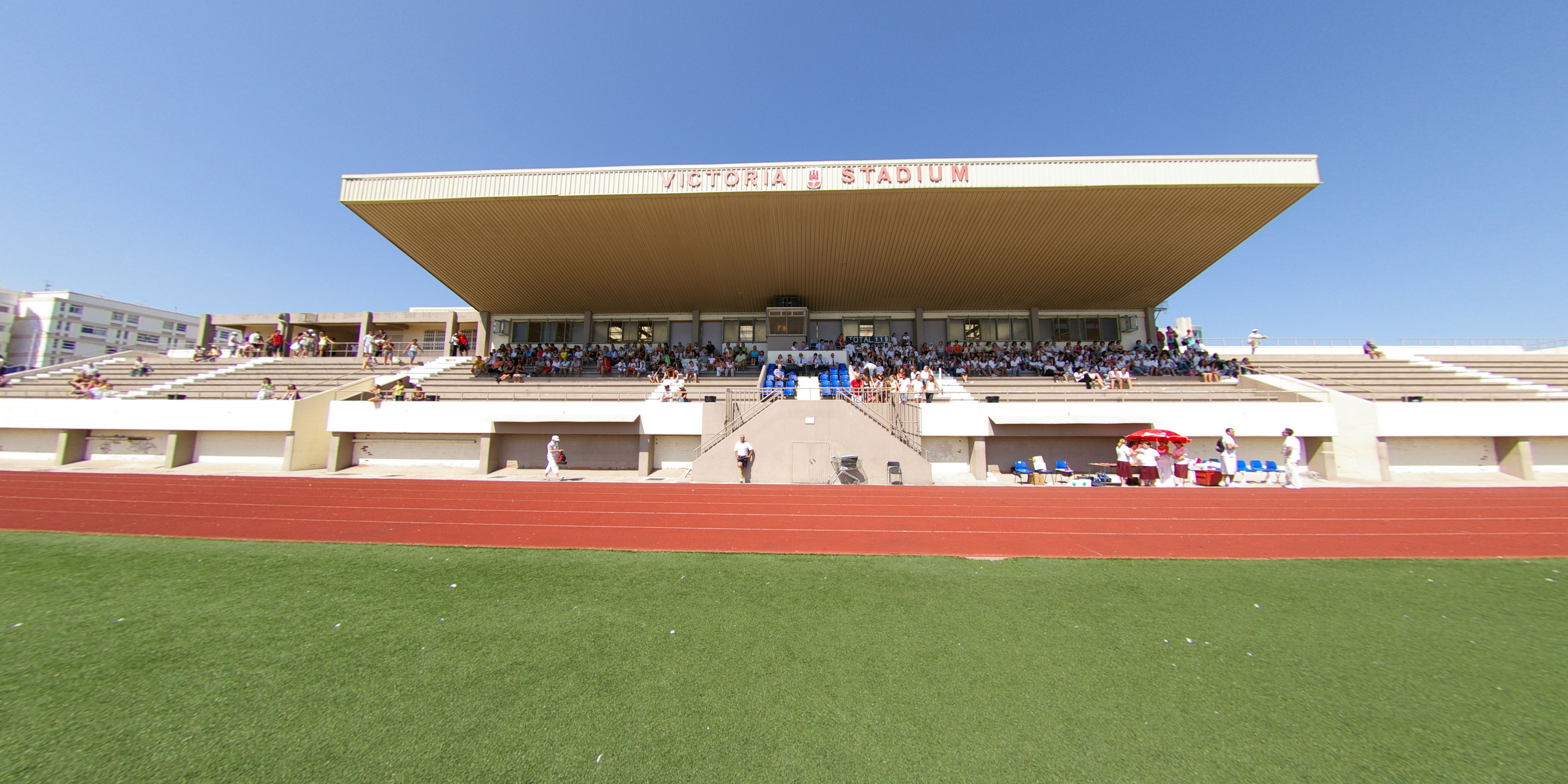
View of the Victoria Stadium's West stand

Victoria Stadium was constructed at the foot of the Rock of Gibraltar and next to Gibraltar Airport in the North District. It was first opened in 1926 as a British military sports ground. In 1970, the stadium was rebuilt by the Royal Engineers as a sports ground for use by both the military forces and the civilian population of Gibraltar. In 1991, the Government of Gibraltar financed improvements of Victoria Stadium's pitch and athletics track.

The construction of the stadium was controversial as it was built on the disputed isthmus between Gibraltar and Spain. When the Gibraltar Football Association applied for membership of UEFA in 2007, Spanish-led opposition caused FIFA officials to look at the wording of the Treaty of Utrecht which ceded Gibraltar to the United Kingdom in 1713. In it, they claimed that there was a loophole in the treaty which they claimed violated FIFA regulations in that the national stadium had to be built on undisputed land. As Victoria Stadium was built on the isthmus which was not mentioned in the Treaty of Utrecht but ceded later and this fact was pointed out to UEFA members, Gibraltar's application was voted by UEFA's member associations to be rejected. Only the Home Nations of England, Wales and Scotland voted in favour of them joining.

Despite initial plans to replace the stadium in the 2010s, the Gibraltar Football Association purchased the stadium from the Government of Gibraltar in April 2017 in order to improve and renovate it. The redevelopment of the stadium began in 2023, with the national team announcing they will play UEFA and FIFA games in Faro, Portugal.

The Gibraltar national team planned to play their 2022–23 UEFA Nations League relegation playoffs at Victoria Stadium, but this match was moved to the Estádio Algarve after the redevelopment of the Victoria Stadium began. Demolition of the stadium began in 2025 as part of the redevelopment project, with preparatory works also starting that year ahead of its replacement with a new modern stadium and upgraded surrounding facilities.

== Football ==
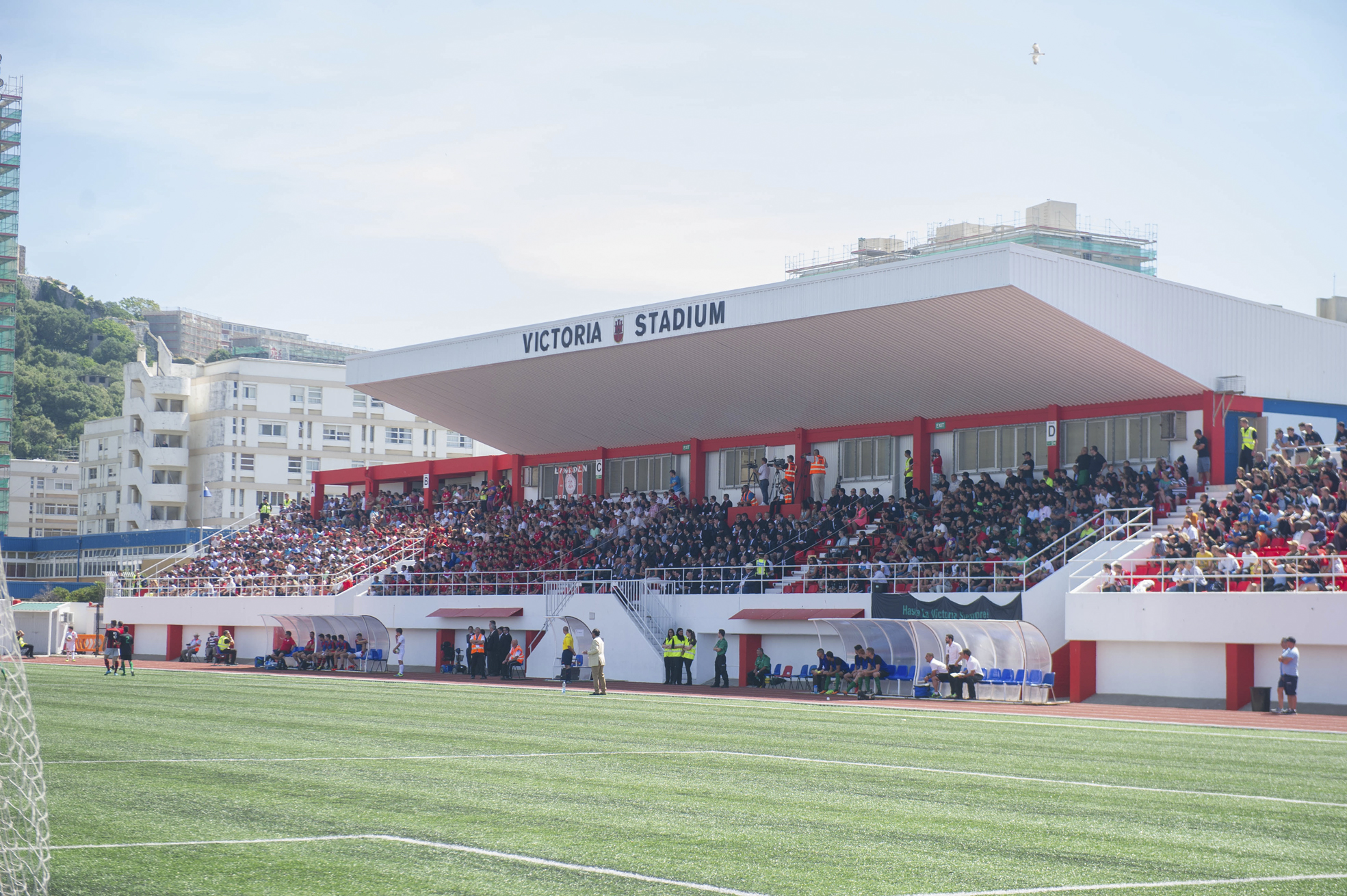
Victoria Stadium during the 2014 Rock Cup Final

Victoria Stadium is mostly used for association football matches. All clubs in the Gibraltar Football League play their matches at Victoria Stadium. As such, it is also used to host the Final of the Rock Cup. Prior to membership of FIFA, it had been used as the Gibraltar national football team's home ground for unofficial internationals.

Following the Gibraltar Football Association's admittance as a full member of UEFA in May 2013, UEFA vetoed Gibraltar using Victoria Stadium as their home ground as it did not meet UEFA standards. Since it was owned by the Government of Gibraltar, the Gibraltar Football Association did not have the power to improve it. The Gibraltar national football team was therefore obliged to play their "home" matches in UEFA and FIFA qualifying tournaments at Estádio Algarve in Faro, Portugal. However they were permitted to play friendly matches at Victoria Stadium. Fabian Picardo, Chief Minister of Gibraltar, stated that the Government would not spend money renovating a stadium that lacked UEFA approval, saying "It would have been the worst possible bargain for the people of Gibraltar to have pursued the GSD’s approach of putting taxpayer’s money into Victoria against the wishes of UEFA at the time".

Victoria Stadium did meet the UEFA criteria as a Category 2 Stadium for UEFA intercontinental club matches such as UEFA Champions League games, such as when Lincoln Red Imps hosted their 2016–17 UEFA Champions League match against Scottish team Celtic. However, in 2017, UEFA stated that Victoria Stadium could not be used for all of Gibraltar's representatives in the UEFA Champions League and UEFA Europa League during the 2017–18 season. This was owing to an increase in the number of Gibraltarian representatives in the competitions and the pitch failing a UEFA inspection.

The Gibraltar Football Association proposed to build the Europa Point Stadium to replace Victoria as Gibraltar's national stadium. Owing to opposition, the Europa Point Stadium plans were scrapped by the Government of Gibraltar. An alternative plan was proposed for a new stadium to be built at the Ministry of Defence-owned Lathbury Barracks, however the Gibraltar Ornithological and Natural History Society opposed this, citing that the proposed site had been designated by the European Union Habitats Directive as a Special Area of Conservation. In April 2017, the Gibraltar Football Association announced its purchase of the stadium in order to redevelop it into a UEFA Category 4 stadium at a cost of £16.5 million given to the GFA by UEFA and FIFA. The proposed new stadium sites at Lathbury and Europa Point would be developed into multi-sports facilities by the Government of Gibraltar. The GFA announced it would invest £15 million into the stadium after purchasing it owing to grants from UEFA and FIFA. As a result of the GFA's purchase of Victoria Stadium, UEFA dropped their objections to the stadium providing works to expand the stadium to 8,000 capacity were complete by 2018 then they would be permitted to use the stadium for their home games in UEFA sanctioned international competition matches. In January 2018, it was announced that due to the Gibraltar Music Festival being held at the stadium that year, football games in August and September would be played at Lathbury Barracks.

== Other sports ==
The ground has also hosted cricket matches since 1993. Victoria Stadium hosted its first cricket match when Marylebone Cricket Club visited Gibraltar in 1993 between Gibraltar and the MCC. It has also been used by the Gibraltar national rugby union team. Victoria Stadium has an Olympic standard 400-metre-six lane athletics track surrounding it and is used to host athletics meets. In 2019, following the redevelopments, Victoria Stadium was used as the main stadium as Gibraltar host the 2019 Island Games. Since 2013, the stadium has annually hosted the Gibraltar Darts Trophy as part of the PDC's European Tour.

== See also ==
- Football in Gibraltar
- Sport in Gibraltar
