= Gibraltar Premier Division =

Former association football league in Gibraltar

- Founded: 1895
- Folded: 2019
- Country: Gibraltar
- Confederation: UEFA
- Number of clubs: 10
- Level on pyramid: 1
- Relegation to: Gibraltar Second Division
- Domestic cup: Rock Cup
- International cup(s): UEFA Champions League; UEFA Europa League
- Most championships: Lincoln Red Imps (24 titles)
- Website: Gibraltar FA

The Gibraltar Premier Division was a football league established by the Gibraltar Football Association (GFA) in 1905, and the top tier of football in Gibraltar. It originally contained eight member clubs, but it has grown over the years. In 1909 the league was split into two divisions between which clubs can be promoted and relegated at the end of each season. In the 2013–14 season, the Premier Division contained eight clubs with the Second Division containing 12 clubs. For sponsorship reasons it is known as the Argus Insurance Premier Division.

From the 2014–15 season, as a result of the territory's membership of UEFA, the champions entered the first UEFA Champions League qualifying round. The winners of Gibraltar's cup competition, the Rock Cup, meanwhile, gained entry to the following season's UEFA Europa League qualifying rounds. From the 2016–17 season, Gibraltar received an additional place in the Europa League qualifying round for the league runner-up. In 2019 the league merged with the Gibraltar Second Division and became the Gibraltar National League.

== History ==
Football in Gibraltar dates from 1892, when military personnel in the territory started playing as Prince of Wales. By 1895 the number of clubs had grown to the point that the Gibraltar Football Association was formed and a tournament (the predecessor to the Premier Division), the Merchants Cup, began, with Gibraltar winning the inaugural competition. By 1907 the Premier Division had officially taken shape with Prince of Wales winning the first full season of league football in Gibraltar. The side went on to win 19 league titles before folding some time in the 1950s.

Since the league's formation, football has been played almost every season, along with the Gibraltar Second Division (founded 1909) and a national cup competition, the Rock Cup. After the FA's admission to UEFA, the Gibraltar Premier Cup was established in 2013 to provide more competitive games for the sides in the top tier.

Due to the restricted and amateur nature of the league in the past, the competition has been prone to spells of dominance at certain times: for example, the early 20th century dominance by Prince of Wales and the 10 league titles in 11 seasons attained by Glacis United in the 1960s and 1970s. At present Lincoln Red Imps are the dominant side in the division, having won every season since 2000–01 with the exception of the 2001–02 season, until 2017. However, the UEFA acceptance and potential for increased professionalism in the league has opened the possibility of other sides closing the gap, with sides such as Manchester 62 and Lynx making inroads in the 2013–14 season. This came to pass in the 2016–17 season, when Europa FC won their first title in over 60 years.

In 2018, the Gibraltar FA announced changes to the league involving an increase in the "Home Grown Player" quota to 3 players on the pitch, per team, at any one time, as well as introducing salary caps (to be introduced in the senior leagues from 2019) and the introduction of the Gibraltar Intermediate League, replacing the Reserves League and Under-18 League, in order to promote local player development.

For the 2019–20 season, the Premier Division and the Second Division were merged to create a single division for Gibraltar, known as the Gibraltar National League.

== Premier Division 2018–19 season ==
Club	Last season
Boca Gibraltar	Gibraltar Second Division, 1st (promoted)
Europa FC	2nd
Gibraltar Phoenix	6th
Gibraltar United	4th
Glacis United	7th
Lincoln Red Imps	1st (champions)
Lions Gibraltar	8th
Lynx	9th
Mons Calpe	5th
St Joseph's	3rd

== League Champions ==
Season	Winner
1895–96	Gibraltar (1)
1896–97	Jubilee (1)
1897–98	Jubilee (2)
1898–99	Albion (1)
1899–1900	Exiles (1)
1900–01	Prince of Wales (1)
1901–02	Exiles (2)
1902–03	Prince of Wales (2)
1903–04	Prince of Wales (3)
1904–05	Athletic (1)
1905–06	Prince of Wales (4)
1906–07	No competition
1907–08	Britannia XI (1)
1908–09	Prince of Wales (5)
1909–10	South United (1)
1910–11	South United (2)
1911–12	Britannia XI (2)
1912–13	Britannia XI (3)
1913–14	Prince of Wales (6)
1914–15	Royal Sovereign (1)
1915–16	No competition
1916–17	Prince of Wales (7)
1917–18	Britannia XI (4)
1918–19	Prince of Wales (8)
1919–20	Britannia XI (5)
1920–21	Prince of Wales (9)
1921–22	Prince of Wales (10)
1922–23	Prince of Wales (11)
1923–24	Gibraltar (2)
1924–25	Prince of Wales (12)
1925–26	Prince of Wales (13)
1926–27	Prince of Wales (14)
1927–28	Prince of Wales (15)
1928–29	Europa (1)
1929–30	Europa (2)
1930–31	Prince of Wales (16)
1931–32	Europa (3)
1932–33	Europa (4)
1933–34	Commander of the Yard (1)
1934–35	Chief Construction (1)

Season	Winner
1935–36	Chief Constructor (1)
1936–37	Britannia XI (6)
1937–38	Europa (5)
1938–39	Prince of Wales (17)
1939–40	Prince of Wales (18)
1940–41	Britannia XI (7)
1941–46	No competition
1946–47	Gibraltar United (1)
1947–48	Gibraltar United (2)
1948–49	Gibraltar United (3)
1949–50	Gibraltar United (4)
1950–51	Gibraltar United (5)
1951–52	Europa (6)
1952–53	Prince of Wales (19)
1953–54	Gibraltar United (6)
1954–55	Britannia XI (8)
1955–56	Britannia XI (9)
1956–57	Britannia XI (10)
1957–58	Britannia XI (11)
1958–59	Britannia XI (12)
1959–60	Gibraltar United (7)
1960–61	Britannia XI (13)
1961–62	Gibraltar United (8)
1962–63	Britannia XI (14)
1963–64	Gibraltar United (9)
1964–65	Gibraltar United (10)
1965–66	Glacis United (1)
1966–67	Glacis United (2)
1967–68	Glacis United (3)
1968–69	Glacis United (4)
1969–70	Glacis United (5)
1970–71	Glacis United (6)
1971–72	Glacis United (7)
1972–73	Glacis United (8)
1973–74	Glacis United (9)
1974–75	Manchester 62 (1)
1975–76	Glacis United (10)
1976–77	Manchester 62 (2)
1977–78	No competition
1978–79	Manchester 62 (3)

Season	Winner
1979–80	Manchester 62 (4)
1980–81	Glacis United (11)
1981–82	Glacis United (12)
1982–83	Glacis United (13)
1983–84	Manchester 62 (5)
1984–85	Glacis United (14) / Lincoln (1)
1985–86	Lincoln Red Imps (2)
1986–87	St Theresa's (1)
1987–88	St Theresa's (2)
1988–89	Glacis United (15)
1989–90	Lincoln Red Imps (3)
1990–91	Lincoln Red Imps (4)
1991–92	Lincoln Red Imps (5)
1992–93	Lincoln Red Imps (6)
1993–94	Lincoln Red Imps (7)
1994–95	Manchester 62 (6)
1995–96	St Joseph's (1)
1996–97	Glacis United (16)
1997–98	St Theresa's (3)
1998–99	Manchester 62 (7)
1999–2000	Glacis United (17)
2000–01	Lincoln Red Imps (8)
2001–02	Gibraltar United (11)
2002–03	Lincoln Red Imps (9)
2003–04	Lincoln Red Imps (10)
2004–05	Lincoln Red Imps (11)
2005–06	Lincoln Red Imps (12)
2006–07	Lincoln Red Imps (13)
2007–08	Lincoln Red Imps (14)
2008–09	Lincoln Red Imps (15)
2009–10	Lincoln Red Imps (16)
2010–11	Lincoln Red Imps (17)
2011–12	Lincoln Red Imps (18)
2012–13	Lincoln Red Imps (19)
2013–14	Lincoln Red Imps (20)
2014–15	Lincoln Red Imps (21)
2015–16	Lincoln Red Imps (22)
2016–17	Europa (7)
2017–18	Lincoln Red Imps (23)
2018–19	Lincoln Red Imps (24)

- Glacis United and Lincoln shared the 1984–85 title.

== Performance by club ==
Bold indicates club still playing in top division.
Italics indicates club no longer active.

Team	Titles	Last Title
**Lincoln Red Imps**	24	2018–19
Prince of Wales	19	1952–53
**Glacis United**	17	1999–2000
Britannia XI	14	1962–63
Gibraltar United	11	2001–02
**Europa**	7	2016–17
**Manchester 62**	7	1998–99
St Theresa's	3	1997–98
Jubilee	2	1897–98
Exiles	2	1901–02
South United	2	1910–11
Gibraltar	2	1923–24
Chief Construction	2	1935–36
Albion	1	1898–99
Athletic	1	1904–05
Royal Sovereign	1	1914–15
Commander of the Yard	1	1933–34
**St Joseph's**	1	1995–96

== See also ==
- Gibraltar National League
- Rock Cup
- Gibraltar Premier Cup
- Pepe Reyes Cup
