= Faroe Islands national football team results (2020–present) =

This article lists the results for the Faroe Islands men's national football team from 2020 to present.

== Key ==
Key to matches

- Att. = Match attendance
- (H) = Home ground
- (A) = Away ground
- (N) = Neutral ground

Key to record by opponent

- Pld = Games played
- W = Games won
- D = Games drawn
- L = Games lost
- GF = Goals for
- GA = Goals against

== Results and fixtures ==
Faroe Islands national football team results and fixtures
No.	Date	Venue	Opponents	Score	Competition	Faroe Islands scorers	Att.	Ref.
199	3 September 2020	Tórsvøllur, Tórshavn (H)	Malta	3–2	2020–21 UEFA Nations League	K. Olsen, A. Olsen, Hendriksson	0 (Note: Played behind closed doors due to the COVID-19 pandemic in Europe.)	
200	6 September 2020	Estadi Nacional, Andorra la Vella (A)	Andorra	1–0	2020–21 UEFA Nations League	K. Olsen	0	
201	7 October 2020	MCH Arena, Herning (A)	Denmark	0–4	Friendly	—	207	
202	10 October 2020	Tórsvøllur, Tórshavn (H)	Latvia	1–1	2020–21 UEFA Nations League	Færø	447	
203	13 October 2020	Tórsvøllur, Tórshavn (H)	Andorra	2–0	2020–21 UEFA Nations League	K. Olsen (2)	0	
204	11 November 2020	LFF Stadium, Vilnius (A)	Lithuania	1–2	Friendly	Vatnhamar	0	
205	14 November 2020	Daugava Stadium, Riga (A)	Latvia	1–1	2020–21 UEFA Nations League	Vatnhamar	0	
206	17 November 2020	National Stadium, Ta' Qali (A)	Malta	1–1	2020–21 UEFA Nations League	Jónsson	0	
207	25 March 2021	Stadionul Zimbru, Chișinău (A)	Moldova	1–1	2022 World Cup qualification	M. Olsen	0	
208	28 March 2021	Ernst-Happel-Stadion, Vienna (A)	Austria	1–3	2022 World Cup qualification	Nattestad	0	
209	31 March 2021	Hampden Park, Glasgow (A)	Scotland	0–4	2022 World Cup qualification	—	0	
210	4 June 2021	Tórsvøllur, Tórshavn (H)	Iceland	0–1	Friendly	—	0	
211	7 June 2021	Tórsvøllur, Tórshavn (H)	Liechtenstein	5–1	Friendly	Olsen (2), Hendriksson (2), Davidsen	0	
212	1 September 2021	Tórsvøllur, Tórshavn (H)	Israel	0–4	2022 World Cup qualification	—	2,666	
213	4 September 2021	Tórsvøllur, Tórshavn (H)	Denmark	0–1	2022 World Cup qualification	—	4,620	
214	7 September 2021	Tórsvøllur, Tórshavn (H)	Moldova	2–1	2022 World Cup qualification	K. Olsen, Vatnsdal	2,714	
215	9 October 2021	Tórsvøllur, Tórshavn (H)	Austria	0–2	2022 World Cup qualification	—	3,021	
216	12 October 2021	Tórsvøllur, Tórshavn (H)	Scotland	0–1	2022 World Cup qualification	—	4,233	
217	12 November 2021	Parken Stadium, Copenhagen (A)	Denmark	1–3	2022 World Cup qualification	K. Olsen	35,531	
218	15 November 2021	Netanya Stadium, Netanya (A)	Israel	2–3	2022 World Cup qualification	Vatnhamar, K. Olsen	6,800	
219	26 March 2022	Victoria Stadium, Gibraltar (A)	Gibraltar	0–0	Friendly	—	727	
220	29 March 2022	Pinatar Arena, San Pedro del Pinatar (N)	Liechtenstein	1–0	Friendly	Johannesen	20	
221	4 June 2022	Başakşehir Fatih Terim Stadium, Istanbul (A)	Turkey	0–4	2022–23 UEFA Nations League	—	9,515	
222	7 June 2022	Tórsvøllur, Tórshavn (H)	Luxembourg	0–1	2022–23 UEFA Nations League	—	2,313	
223	11 June 2022	Tórsvøllur, Tórshavn (H)	Lithuania	2–1	2022–23 UEFA Nations League	Davidsen, Andreasen	2,278	
224	14 June 2022	Stade de Luxembourg, Luxembourg City (A)	Luxembourg	2–2	2022–23 UEFA Nations League	Bjartalíð (2)	5,325	
225	22 September 2022	LFF Stadium, Vilnius (A)	Lithuania	1–1	2022–23 UEFA Nations League	Andreasen	2,376	
226	25 September 2022	Tórsvøllur, Tórshavn (H)	Turkey	2–1	2022–23 UEFA Nations League	Davidsen, Edmundsson	2,056	
227	16 November 2022	Andrův stadion, Olomouc (A)	Czech Republic	0–5	Friendly	—	10,762	
228	19 November 2022	Fadil Vokrri Stadium, Pristina (A)	Kosovo	1–1	Friendly	Radosavljevic	2,100	
229	24 March 2023	Stadionul Zimbru, Chișinău (A)	Moldova	1–1	UEFA Euro 2024 qualifying	Mikkelsen	4,944	
230	27 March 2023	Toše Proeski Arena, Skopje (A)	North Macedonia	0–1	Friendly	—	500	
231	17 June 2023	Tórsvøllur, Tórshavn (H)	Czech Republic	0–3	UEFA Euro 2024 qualifying	—	2,232	
232	20 June 2023	Tórsvøllur, Tórshavn (H)	Albania	1–3	UEFA Euro 2024 qualifying	Færø	2,507	
233	7 September 2023	Stadion Narodowy, Warsaw (A)	Poland	0–2	UEFA Euro 2024 qualifying	—	54,129	
234	10 September 2023	Tórsvøllur, Tórshavn (H)	Moldova	0–1	UEFA Euro 2024 qualifying	—	2,710	
235	12 October 2023	Tórsvøllur, Tórshavn (H)	Poland	0–2	UEFA Euro 2024 qualifying	—	3,220	
236	15 October 2023	Doosan Arena, Plzeň (A)	Czech Republic	0–1	UEFA Euro 2024 qualifying	—	9,115	
237	16 November 2023	Ullevaal Stadion, Oslo (A)	Norway	0–2	Friendly	—	11,071	
238	20 November 2023	Arena Kombëtare, Tirana (A)	Albania	0–0	UEFA Euro 2024 qualifying	—	21,456	
239	22 March 2024	Marbella Football Center, Marbella (N)	Liechtenstein	4–0	Friendly	P. Petersen (2), Justinussen, A.Svensson	25	
240	26 March 2024	Brøndby Stadium, Brøndby (A)	Denmark	0–2	Friendly	—	17,332	
241	8 June 2024	Lilleküla Stadium, Tallinn (A)	Estonia	1–4	2024 Baltic Cup Semi-final	Knudsen	3,919	
242	11 June 2024	Daugava Stadium, Liepāja (A)	Latvia	0–1	2024 Baltic Cup 3rd place	—	1,414	
243	7 September 2024	Tórsvøllur, Tórshavn (H)	North Macedonia	1–1	2024–25 UEFA Nations League	Davidsen	2,057	
244	10 September 2024	Skonto Stadium, Riga (A)	Latvia	0–1	2024–25 UEFA Nations League	—	5,808	
245	10 October 2024	Tórsvøllur, Tórshavn (H)	Armenia	2–2	2024–25 UEFA Nations League	Benjaminsen, Bjartalíð	1,852	
246	13 October 2024	Tórsvøllur, Tórshavn (H)	Latvia	1–1	2024–25 UEFA Nations League	Sørensen	2,017	
247	14 November 2024	Vazgen Sargsyan Republican Stadium, Yerevan (A)	Armenia	1–0	2024–25 UEFA Nations League	Davidsen	6,043	
248	17 November 2024	Toše Proeski Arena, Skopje (A)	North Macedonia	0–1	2024–25 UEFA Nations League	—	7,450	
249	22 March 2025	Malšovická aréna, Hradec Králové (A)	Czech Republic	1–2	2026 World Cup qualification	Vatnhamar	8,978	
250	25 March 2025	Gradski stadion, Nikšić (A)	Montenegro	0–1	2026 World Cup qualification	—	3,226	
251	5 June 2025	Boris Paichadze Dinamo Arena, Tbilisi (A)	Georgia	0–1	Friendly	—	17,645	
252	9 June 2025	Tórsvøllur, Tórshavn (H)	Gibraltar	2–1	2026 World Cup qualification	Frederiksberg, Johannsen	2,632	
253	5 September 2025	Tórsvøllur, Tórshavn (H)	Croatia	0–1	2026 World Cup qualification	—	4,632	
254	8 September 2025	Europa Sports Park, Europa Point (A)	Gibraltar	1–0	2026 World Cup qualification	Agnarsson	1,603	
255	9 October 2025	Tórsvøllur, Tórshavn (H)	Montenegro	4–0	2026 World Cup qualification	Sørensen (2), Own goal, Frederiksberg	2,034	
256	12 October 2025	Tórsvøllur, Tórshavn (H)	Czech Republic	2–1	2026 World Cup qualification	Sørensen, Agnarsson	2,908	
257	14 November 2025	Stadion Rujevica, Rijeka (A)	Croatia	1–3	2026 World Cup qualification	Turi	7,846	
258	18 November 2025	Stadion Aldo Drosina, Pula (N)	Kazakhstan	1–0	Friendly	Knudsen	75	
259	28 March 2026	San Marino Stadium, Serravalle (A)	San Marino	2–1	Friendly	Andreasen, Frederiksberg	320	
260	6 June 2026	Pärnu Rannastaadion, Pärnu (A)	Estonia	0–1	2026 Baltic Cup Semi-final	—	1,543	
261	9 June 2026	LNK Sporta Parks, Riga (A)	Latvia	1–0	2026 Baltic Cup 3rd Place	Sørensen	729	
262	26 September 2026	Tórsvøllur, Tórshavn (H)	Kazakhstan	1–1	2026–27 UEFA Nations League	Samuelsen	2,458	
263	29 September 2026	Stadionul Zimbru, Chișinău (A)	Moldova	1–1	2026–27 UEFA Nations League	Davidsen	4,542	
264	2 October 2026	Tórsvøllur, Tórshavn (H)	Slovakia	1–1	2026–27 UEFA Nations League	Justinussen	2,853	
265	6 October 2026	Astana Arena, Astana (A)	Kazakhstan	2–2	2026–27 UEFA Nations League	Knudsen, Turi	10,315	
266	13 November 2026	Košická futbalová aréna, Košice (A)	Slovakia	2–2	2026–27 UEFA Nations League	Davidsen, Samuelsen	11,013	
267	16 November 2026	Tórsvøllur, Tórshavn (H)	Moldova	1–0	2026–27 UEFA Nations League	Samuelsen	4,167	

== Head-to-head record ==
Team	Pld	W	D	L	GF	GA	GD	WPCT
Albania	2	0	1	1	1	3	−2	0.00
Armenia	2	1	1	0	3	2	+1	50.00
Andorra	2	2	0	0	3	0	+3	100.00
Austria	2	0	0	2	1	5	−4	0.00
Croatia	2	0	0	2	1	4	−3	0.00
Czech Republic	5	1	0	4	3	12	−9	20.00
Denmark	4	0	0	4	1	10	−9	0.00
Estonia	2	0	0	2	1	5	−4	0.00
Georgia	1	0	0	1	0	1	−1	0.00
Gibraltar	3	2	1	0	3	1	+2	66.67
Iceland	1	0	0	1	0	1	−1	0.00
Israel	2	0	0	2	2	7	−5	0.00
Kazakhstan	3	1	2	0	4	3	+1	33.33
Kosovo	1	0	1	0	1	1	0	0.00
Latvia	6	1	3	2	4	5	−1	16.67
Liechtenstein	3	3	0	0	10	1	+9	100.00
Lithuania	3	1	1	1	4	4	0	33.33
Luxembourg	2	0	1	1	2	3	−1	0.00
Malta	2	1	1	0	4	3	+1	50.00
Moldova	6	2	3	1	6	5	+1	33.33
Montenegro	2	1	0	1	4	1	+3	50.00
North Macedonia	3	0	1	2	1	3	−2	0.00
Norway	1	0	0	1	0	2	−2	0.00
Poland	2	0	0	2	0	4	−4	0.00
San Marino	1	1	0	0	2	1	+1	100.00
Scotland	2	0	0	2	0	5	−5	0.00
Slovakia	2	0	2	0	3	3	0	0.00
Turkey	2	1	0	1	2	5	−3	50.00
Total	69	18	18	33	66	100	−34	26.09

Source: Results
