= 2022–23 Rock Cup =

Football tournament season

Tournament details
- Country: Gibraltar
- Dates: 16 January – 27 April 2023
- Teams: 12

Final positions
- Champions: Bruno's Magpies
- Runners-up: Lincoln Red Imps

Tournament statistics
- Matches played: 11
- Goals scored: 34 (3.09 per match)
- Top goal scorer: Juanfri (4 goals)

The 2022–23 Rock Cup was a single-leg knockout tournament contested by clubs from Gibraltar, with twelve clubs participating.

Lincoln Red Imps were the two-time defending champions, having defeated Bruno's Magpies in the final last season. The 2023 final is a rematch of the 2022 final, the previous final. This time, Bruno's Magpies won the title against Lincoln Red Imps 4–2 on penalties following a 1–1 draw.

== Bracket ==
First round
19 January 2023
College 1975 | 0
Mons Calpe | 3
17 January 2023
Hound Dogs | 1
Lions Gibraltar | 7
18 January 2023
Europa Point | 0
Bruno's Magpies | 1
16 January 2023
Lincoln Red Imps | 3
Europa | 2

Quarter-finals
19 February 2023
Glacis United | 0
Mons Calpe | 1
18 February 2023
Lions Gibraltar | 1
Bruno's Magpies | 2
18 February 2023
Lincoln Red Imps | 5
Lynx | 0
19 February 2023
Manchester 62 | 0
St Joseph's | 2

Semi-finals
4 April 2023
Mons Calpe | 0
Bruno's Magpies | 1
5 April 2023
Lincoln Red Imps (a.e.t.) | 2
St Joseph's | 1

Final
27 April 2023
Bruno's Magpies (p) | 1 (4)
Lincoln Red Imps | 1 (2)

== First round ==
The draw for the first round of this season's tournament was held on 12 December 2022. Manchester 62 received a bye to the quarter-finals by virtue of winning the GFA Challenge Trophy last season.

After the draw, 3 more teams received byes to the next round: Glacis United, St Joseph's and Lynx.

All kick off times are in CET.

| 16 January 2023 | Lincoln Red Imps | 3–2 | Europa | Gibraltar |
| 20:45 | Juanfri 13', 45+2'; Walker 64' | Report | Olivero 6'; Paul 38' | Stadium: Victoria Stadium; Referee: Jason Barcelo |

| 17 January 2023 | Hound Dogs | 1–7 | Lions Gibraltar | Gibraltar |
| 20:45 | Celecia 51' | Report | Labra 1', 11'; Hastings 36'; David 38', 66'; Cintas 73'; Gaivizo 77' | Stadium: Victoria Stadium; Referee: Patrick Canepa |

| 18 January 2023 | Europa Point | 0–1 | Bruno's Magpies | Gibraltar |
| 20:45 | | Report | Tato 11' | Stadium: Victoria Stadium; Referee: Eduardo Vasquez |

| 19 January 2023 | College 1975 | 0–3 | Mons Calpe | Gibraltar |
| 20:45 | | Report | Garro 45+2'; dos Santos 46'; Bernardes 90+3' | Stadium: Victoria Stadium; Referee: Herbert Warwick |

== Quarter-finals ==
The draw for the quarter-finals took place on 24 January 2023.

| 18 February 2023 | Lions Gibraltar | 1–2 | Bruno's Magpies | Gibraltar |
| 16:00 | Labra 74' | Report | Storer 63'; K. Casciaro 70' | Stadium: Victoria Stadium; Referee: Denis Perez |

| 18 February 2023 | Lincoln Red Imps | 5–0 | Lynx | Gibraltar |
| 18:30 | Juanfri 16', 83'; Gómez 37'; Juampe 55'; Ronan 72' | Report | | Stadium: Victoria Stadium; Referee: Jose Antonio Delgado |

| 19 February 2023 | Manchester 62 | 0–2 | St Joseph's | Gibraltar |
| 16:00 | | Report | Caballero 3'; P. Rodríguez 65' | Stadium: Victoria Stadium; Referee: Herbert Warwick |

| 19 February 2023 | Glacis United | 0–1 | Mons Calpe | Gibraltar |
| 18:30 | | Report | Bernardes 2' | Stadium: Victoria Stadium; Referee: Patrick Canepa |

== Semi-finals ==
The draw for the semi-finals took place on 23 February 2023.

| 4 April 2023 | Mons Calpe | 0–1 | Bruno's Magpies | Gibraltar |
| 20:00 | | Report | K. Casciaro 33' | Stadium: Victoria Stadium; Referee: Herbert Warwick |

| 5 April 2023 | Lincoln Red Imps | 2–1 (a.e.t.) | St Joseph's | Gibraltar |
| 20:00 | Gómez 6'; Rosa 98' | | P. Rodríguez 45+2' | Stadium: Victoria Stadium; Referee: Patrick Canepa |

== Final ==
27 April 2023
19:30

| Bruno's Magpies | 1–1 (a.e.t.) | Lincoln Red Imps |
|---|---|---|
| Bent 60' | Report | Yahaya 31' |
Penalties
| K. Casciaro (penalty scored); Storer (penalty missed); Bent (penalty scored); Zúñiga (penalty scored); Galán (penalty scored) | 4–2 | (penalty scored) E. Britto; (penalty missed) Lopes; (penalty missed) Valarino; (penalty scored) Gómez |

Victoria Stadium, Gibraltar
Referee: Timothy Reoch

| Bruno's Magpies | Lincoln Red Imps |

| GK | 13 | (Gibraltar) Jaylan Hankins |
| RB | 4 | (Spain) Rubén Díaz | (yellow card) 110' | (substituted off) 112' |
| LB | 6 | (Spain) Olmo González | | (substituted off) 118' |
| CB | 5 | (Mexico) Paco Zúñiga (c) | (yellow card) 40' |
| CB | 23 | (Spain) Joe |
| CM | 14 | (Gibraltar) Scott Ballantine |
| CM | 19 | (England) Dan Bent |
| CM | 53 | (Gibraltar) Luke Bautista |
| RW | 8 | (Gibraltar) Jamie Coombes | | (substituted off) 87' |
| LW | 11 | (Gibraltar) Kyle Casciaro |
| ST | 18 | (England) Jack Storer | (yellow card) 94' |
Substitutes:
| GK | 1 | (Canada) Matt Silva |
| DF | 20 | (England) Jack Horrocks |
| MF | 7 | (Gibraltar) Jeremy Lopez |
| MF | 21 | (Spain) José Galán | | (substituted on) 87' |
| MF | 33 | (Gibraltar) Alan Parker | | (substituted on) 118' |
| FW | 31 | (Gibraltar) Julian Del Rio | | (substituted on) 112' |
| FW | 39 | (Argentina) Pibe |
Manager:
(England) Nathan Rooney

| GK | 23 | (Gibraltar) Dayle Coleing |
| RB | 5 | (Gibraltar) Scott Wiseman |
| LB | 21 | (Spain) Nano |
| CB | 6 | (Gibraltar) Bernardo Lopes (c) |
| CB | 24 | (Gibraltar) Jack Sergeant | | (substituted off) 106' |
| CM | 17 | (Spain) Marco Rosa | (yellow card) 54' | (substituted off) 78' |
| CM | 20 | (Ghana) Mustapha Yahaya | (yellow card) 65' |
| CM | 22 | (Gibraltar) Graeme Torrilla | (yellow card) 36' | (substituted off) 102' |
| RW | 11 | (Spain) Juampe | | (substituted off) 90+4' |
| LW | 19 | (Spain) Juanfri | | (substituted off) 61' |
| ST | 9 | (Philippines) Kike Gómez |
Substitutes:
| GK | 1 | (Spain) Nauzet Santana |
| DF | 2 | (Spain) Jesús Toscano | | (substituted on) 90+4' |
| DF | 14 | (Gibraltar) Roy Chipolina | | (substituted on) 102' |
| DF | 66 | (Gibraltar) Ethan Britto | (yellow card) 65' | (substituted on) 61' |
| MF | 8 | (Gibraltar) Julian Valarino | | (substituted on) 78' |
| MF | 77 | (Gibraltar) Kyle Clinton | | (substituted on) 106' |
| FW | 31 | (Gibraltar) Jonathan Sciortino |
Manager:
(Spain) Javi Muñoz

Man of the match:

Match officials

- Assistant referees: Fausti Guerrero & Adrian Carrillo
- Fourth official: Seth Galia
- Delegates: Albert Pulham & Aurelio Wink
- Referee observer: Adrian Bacarisa

Match rules

- 90 minutes.
- 30 minutes of extra-time if necessary.
- Penalty shoot-out if scores still level.
- A minimum of 5 players with Home Grown Player (HGP) status must be on the field at all times.
- Seven named substitutes.
- Maximum of five substitutions, with a sixth allowed in extra time. (Note: Each team was given only three opportunities to make substitutions, with a fourth opportunity in extra time, excluding substitutions made at half-time, before the start of extra time and at half-time in extra time.)

== Scorers ==
4 goals

- (Spain) Juanfri (Lincoln Red Imps)

3 goals

- (Spain) Labra (Lions Gibraltar)

2 goals

- (Gibraltar) Kyle Casciaro (Bruno's Magpies)
- (Philippines) Kike Gómez (Lincoln Red Imps)
- (Spain) Joel David (Lions Gibraltar)
- (Brazil) Renan Bernardes (Mons Calpe)
- (Spain) Pablo Rodríguez (St Joseph's)

1 goal

- (England) Dan Bent (Bruno's Magpies)
- (England) Jack Storer (Bruno's Magpies)
- (Spain) Tato (Bruno's Magpies)
- (Gibraltar) Jayce Olivero (Europa)
- (Spain) Javi Paul (Europa)
- (Gibraltar) Anthony Celecia (Hound Dogs)
- (Spain) Juampe (Lincoln Red Imps)
- (Gibraltar) Kian Ronan (Lincoln Red Imps)
- (Spain) Marco Rosa (Lincoln Red Imps)
- (Gibraltar) Liam Walker (Lincoln Red Imps)
- (Ghana) Mustapha Yahaya (Lincoln Red Imps)
- (Spain) Antonio Cintas (Lions Gibraltar)
- Charles Gaivizo (Lions Gibraltar)
- Thomas Hastings (Lions Gibraltar)
- (Brazil) Andre dos Santos (Mons Calpe)
- (Gibraltar) Sykes Garro (Mons Calpe)
- (Spain) Manuel Caballero (St Joseph's)

== See also ==
- 2022–23 Gibraltar National League
- 2022–23 Gibraltar Intermediate League - Hound Dogs participate in this league.
