= Dan Bent =

Gibraltarian footballer (born 1996)

Daniel Bent
- Bent with Larne in 2026

Personal information
- Full name: Daniel David Bent
- Date of birth: 10 January 1996 (age 30)
- Place of birth: London, United Kingdom
- Positions: Defensive midfielder; centre-back

Team information
- Current team: Larne
- Number: 26

Youth career
- Pro Soccer Academy
- 2013–2015: Gillingham
- 2017: Columbus Crew

College career
Years	Team	Apps	(Gls)
2015–2016	Reinhardt Eagles	16	(0)
2016–2018	Wright State Raiders	48	(1)

Senior career*
Years	Team	Apps	(Gls)
2012–2013	Corinthian		
2016	Dayton Dutch Lions	4	(0)
2018	SC United Bantams	10	(0)
2019–2023	Bruno's Magpies	60	(1)
2023–2024	Manchester 62	7	(1)
2024–2025	Lincoln Red Imps	35	(6)
2025–	Larne	32	(7)

International career^{‡}
2024–	Gibraltar	23	(2)
- * Club domestic league appearances and goals as of 6 November 2026 ‡ National team caps and goals as of 18 November 2026

Daniel David Bent (born 10 January 1996) is a professional footballer who plays as a defensive midfielder for NIFL Premiership side Larne. Born in England, he represents the Gibraltar national football team at international level.

== Early life ==
Bent was born on 10 January 1996 in London, England. He grew up in Kent, England.

== Club career ==
=== Early career ===
Dan Bent began his career at Corinthian and made his senior breakthrough at the age of 16, during the 2012–13 season. During his time at Corinthian, he had a trial at Dagenham & Redbridge. He left Corinthian at the end of the season after being offered a scholarship by Gillingham, staying with the Kent side for two years before leaving to play college soccer in the United States. During his time in America, he also spent time with Columbus Crew U23, as well as PDL sides Dayton Dutch Lions and SC United Bantams.

=== College career ===
In 2015 he moved to the United States to play college soccer with Reinhardt Eagles, but after one season moved to Wright State Raiders, where he spent three years, winning the Horizon League twice in that time.

=== Move to Gibraltar ===
In 2019, after completing his studies in the US, Bent relocated to Gibraltar to join ambitious Bruno's Magpies in the newly formed Gibraltar National League. He played under English manager Nathan Rooney while playing for the club. He spent four years at the club during which time he won the GFA Challenge Trophy and the 2022–23 Rock Cup. On 9 August 2023, he moved to Manchester 62. However, the club's perilous financial situation caused him to leave after half a season, and he joined Lincoln Red Imps on 8 January 2024. In his first half season, he helped secure a league and cup double.

=== Return to the UK ===
On 16 June 2025, after a season and a half with Lincoln Red Imps, Bent reunited with former coach Nathan Rooney when he joined NIFL Premiership side Larne. He played in the UEFA Conference League while playing for the club.

== International career ==
Born and raised in England, Bent naturalised for Gibraltar in 2024 and received his first call-up in August that year. He made his international debut on 4 September, starting the match vs Andorra at Europa Sports Park and scoring on his debut.

== Style of play ==
Bent plays as a Defensive midfielder or centre-back. He is known for his versatility.

== Career statistics ==
=== International ===
As of match played 16 November 2026

Appearances and goals by national team and year
National team	Year	Apps	Goals
Gibraltar
Gibraltar	2024	5	1
Gibraltar	2025	8	1
Gibraltar	2026	10	0
Total		23	2

== International goals ==
No.	Date	Venue	Opponent	Score	Result	Competition
1	4 September 2024	Europa Point Stadium, Europa Point, Gibraltar	Andorra	1–0	1–0	Friendly
2	22 March 2025	Gradski stadion, Nikšić, Montenegro	Montenegro	1–0	1–3	2026 FIFA World Cup qualification

== Honours ==
Wright State Raiders

- Horizon League: 2016, 2018

Bruno's Magpies

- GFA Challenge Trophy: 2020–21
- Rock Cup: 2022–23

Lincoln Red Imps

- Gibraltar Football League: 2023–24, 2024–25
- Rock Cup: 2023–24

Larne

- NIFL Premiership: 2025–26
- NIFL Charity Shield: 2026
