= Kevin Zonzini =

Sammarinese footballer

Personal information
- Full name: Kevin Zonzini
- Date of birth: 11 August 1997 (age 29)
- Place of birth: San Marino
- Position: Midfielder

Team information
- Current team: Faetano
- Number: 11

Senior career*
Years	Team	Apps	(Gls)
2014–2017	San Marino		
2016–2021	Cosmos	59	(2)
2021–2023	Tre Penne	24	(4)
2022–2023	FC Domagnano (loan)	20	(4)
2023–2024	Cailungo	27	(1)
2024–	Faetano	59	(2)

International career^{‡}
2015	San Marino U19	3	(0)
2017–2018	San Marino U21	5	(0)
2020–	San Marino	6	(0)
- * Club domestic league appearances and goals as of 5 June 2026 ‡ National team caps and goals as of 13 November 2021

Kevin Zonzini (born 11 August 1997) is a Sammarinese footballer who plays as a midfielder for Faetano and the San Marino national team.

== Career ==
Zonzini made his international debut for San Marino on 5 September 2020 in the UEFA Nations League against Gibraltar.

== Career statistics ==
=== International ===
As of 13 November 2021

San Marino
Year	Apps	Goals
2020	3	0
2021	3	0
Total	6	0
