= List of Gibraltar national football team captains =

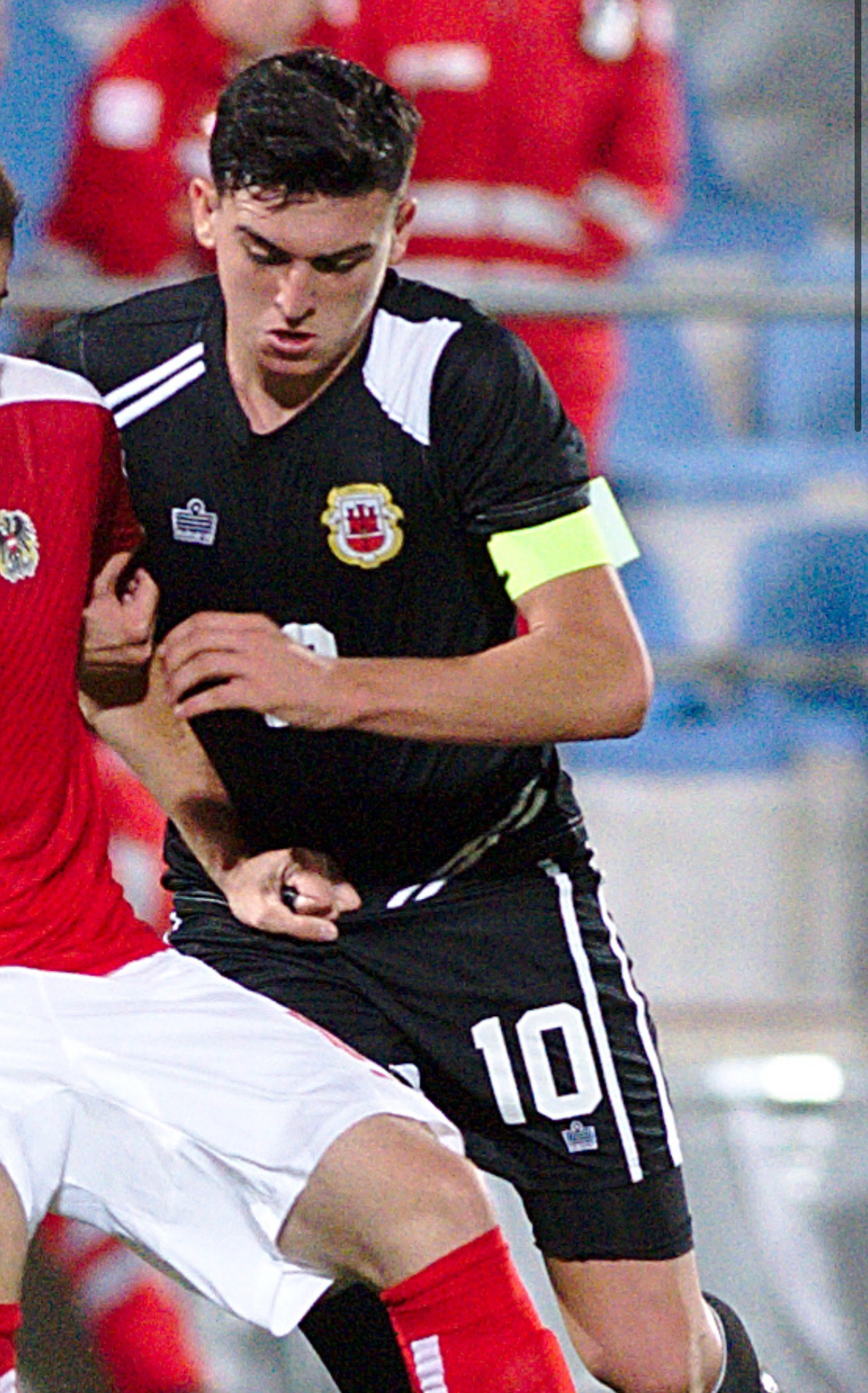
Graeme Torrilla is a current captain of the Gibraltar national team.

This is a list of all the players who have captained the Gibraltar national football team since its full UEFA membership in May 2013.

Roy Chipolina was the first captain of the Gibraltar national football team.

He wore the captain band the most times (73).

Graeme Torrilla is the current captain of the national team.

== List of captains ==
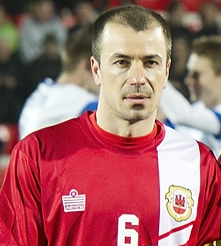
Roy Chipolina was the first captain and a player with the most captaincies for Gibraltar with 73 matches.

List of captaincy periods of the various captains throughout the years.

As of 13 November 2026, after the game against Andorra

Players in bold are still active. Years in italics indicate last year, when still an active player was a captain.

#	Name	Captain	Appearances	Goals	National years	Captaincy years
1	Roy Chipolina	73	75	5	2013–2024	2013–2024
2	Liam Walker	13	88	8	2013–2025	2015–2025
3	**Graeme Torrilla**	9	43	1	2020–	2025–2026
4	Lee Casciaro	4	67	3	2014–2026	2020–2026
4	**Tjay De Barr**	4	64	4	2018–	2025–2026
6	Joseph Chipolina	3	61	2	2013–2024	2014–2018
7	**Louie Annesley**	2	57	1	2018–	2025–2025
8	**Jayce Olivero**	1	66	0	2016–	2020
8	**Jack Sergeant**	1	61	0	2013–	2021
8	**Julian Valarino**	1	39	1	2021–	2026
8	Scott Wiseman	1	38	0	2013–2023	2021
8	Ryan Casciaro	1	24	0	2013–2018	2016
Total	12 players	113			2013–2026	2013–2026
