= UEFA Euro 2024 qualifying Group E =

Group E of UEFA Euro 2024 qualifying was one of the ten groups to decide which teams would qualify for the UEFA Euro 2024 final tournament in Germany. Group E consisted of five teams: Albania, the Czech Republic, Faroe Islands, Moldova and Poland. The teams played against each other home-and-away in a round-robin format.

The top two teams, Albania and the Czech Republic, qualified directly for the final tournament. The participants of the qualifying play-offs were decided based on their performance in the 2022–23 UEFA Nations League.

== Standings ==
Pos	Team	Pld	W	D	L	GF	GA	GD	Pts	Qualification	(Albania)	(Czech Republic)	(Poland)	(Moldova)	(Faroe Islands)
1	Albania	8	4	3	1	12	4	+8	15 (Note: Head to head points: Albania 4, Czech Republic 1.)	Qualify for final tournament	—	3–0	2–0	2–0	0–0
2	Czech Republic	8	4	3	1	12	6	+6	15	Qualify for final tournament	1–1	—	3–1	3–0	1–0
3	Poland	8	3	2	3	10	10	0	11	Advance to play-offs via Nations League	1–0	1–1	—	1–1	2–0
4	Moldova	8	2	4	2	7	10	−3	10		1–1	0–0	3–2	—	1–1
5	Faroe Islands	8	0	2	6	2	13	−11	2		1–3	0–3	0–2	0–1	—

Source: UEFA
Rules for classification: Qualification tiebreakers

== Matches ==
The fixture list was confirmed by UEFA on 10 October 2022, the day after the draw. Times are CET/CEST, (Note: CET (UTC+1) for matches until 25 March and from 29 October (matchday 1 and 9–10), and CEST (UTC+2) for matches from 26 March to 28 October 2023 (matchday 2–8).) as listed by UEFA (local times, if different, are in parentheses).

24 March 2023
20:45

Czech Republic	3–1	Poland
Krejčí 1'; Čvančara 3'; Kuchta 64'	Report	D. Szymański 87'

Eden Arena, Prague
Attendance: 19,045
Referee: Anastasios Sidiropoulos (Greece)
24 March 2023
20:45 (21:45 UTC+2)

Moldova	1–1	Faroe Islands
Nicolaescu 87' (pen.)	Report	Mikkelsen 27'

Stadionul Zimbru, Chișinău
Attendance: 4,732
Referee: Nick Walsh (Scotland)

27 March 2023
20:45 (21:45 UTC+3)

Moldova	0–0	Czech Republic
	Report

Stadionul Zimbru, Chișinău
Attendance: 5,120
Referee: Daniel Schlager (Germany)
27 March 2023
20:45

Poland	1–0	Albania
Świderski 41'	Report

Stadion Narodowy, Warsaw
Attendance: 56,227
Referee: Slavko Vinčić (Slovenia)

17 June 2023
20:45

Albania	2–0	Moldova
Asani 52'; Bajrami 76'	Report

Arena Kombëtare, Tirana
Attendance: 20,944
Referee: Dennis Higler (Netherlands)
17 June 2023
20:45 (19:45 UTC+1)

Faroe Islands	0–3	Czech Republic
	Report	Krejčí 15'; Černý 44', 75'

Tórsvøllur, Tórshavn
Attendance: 2,232
Referee: Arda Kardeşler (Turkey)

20 June 2023
20:45 (19:45 UTC+1)

Faroe Islands	1–3	Albania
Færø 45+1'	Report	Bajrami 20'; Asllani 51'; Muçi 90+1'

Tórsvøllur, Tórshavn
Attendance: 2,507
Referee: Chrysovalantis Theouli (Cyprus)
20 June 2023
20:45 (21:45 UTC+3)

Moldova	3–2	Poland
Nicolaescu 48', 79'; Baboglo 85'	Report	Milik 12'; Lewandowski 34'

Stadionul Zimbru, Chișinău
Attendance: 9,442
Referee: Filip Glova (Slovakia)

7 September 2023
20:45

Czech Republic	1–1	Albania
Černý 56'	Report	Bajrami 66'

Eden Arena, Prague
Attendance: 18,641
Referee: Anthony Taylor (England)
7 September 2023
20:45

Poland	2–0	Faroe Islands
Lewandowski 73' (pen.), 83'	Report

Stadion Narodowy, Warsaw
Attendance: 54,129
Referee: David Šmajc (Slovenia)

10 September 2023
18:00 (17:00 UTC+1)

Faroe Islands	0–1	Moldova
	Report	Rață 53'

Tórsvøllur, Tórshavn
Attendance: 2,710
Referee: Vassilios Fotias (Greece)
10 September 2023
20:45

Albania	2–0	Poland
Asani 37'; Daku 62'	Report

Arena Kombëtare, Tirana
Attendance: 21,900
Referee: José María Sánchez Martínez (Spain)

12 October 2023
20:45

Albania	3–0	Czech Republic
Asani 9'; Seferi 51', 73'	Report

Arena Kombëtare, Tirana
Attendance: 20,917
Referee: Danny Makkelie (Netherlands)
12 October 2023
20:45 (19:45 UTC+1)

Faroe Islands	0–2	Poland
	Report	S. Szymański 4'; Buksa 65'

Tórsvøllur, Tórshavn
Attendance: 3,220
Referee: Allard Lindhout (Netherlands)

15 October 2023
18:00

Czech Republic	1–0	Faroe Islands
Souček 76' (pen.)	Report

Štruncovy sady Stadion, Plzeň
Attendance: 9,115
Referee: Rohit Saggi (Norway)
15 October 2023
20:45

Poland	1–1	Moldova
Świderski 53'	Report	Nicolaescu 26'

Stadion Narodowy, Warsaw
Attendance: 51,672
Referee: Artur Soares Dias (Portugal)

17 November 2023
18:00 (19:00 UTC+2)

Moldova	1–1	Albania
Baboglo 87'	Report	Cikalleshi 25' (pen.)

Stadionul Zimbru, Chișinău
Attendance: 9,537
Referee: Willie Collum (Scotland)
17 November 2023
20:45

Poland	1–1	Czech Republic
Piotrowski 38'	Report	Souček 49'

Stadion Narodowy, Warsaw
Attendance: 56,310
Referee: Daniele Orsato (Italy)

20 November 2023
20:45

Albania	0–0	Faroe Islands
	Report

Arena Kombëtare, Tirana
Attendance: 21,456
Referee: Sven Jablonski (Germany)
20 November 2023
20:45

Czech Republic	3–0	Moldova
Douděra 14'; Chorý 72'; Souček 90'	Report

Andrův stadion, Olomouc
Attendance: 11,653
Referee: Sandro Schärer (Switzerland)

== Goalscorers ==
There were 43 goals scored in 20 matches, for an average of 2.15 goals per match.

4 goals

- (Moldova) Ion Nicolaescu

3 goals

- (Albania) Jasir Asani
- (Albania) Nedim Bajrami
- (Czech Republic) Václav Černý
- (Czech Republic) Tomáš Souček
- (Poland) Robert Lewandowski

2 goals

- (Albania) Taulant Seferi
- (Czech Republic) Ladislav Krejčí
- (Moldova) Vladislav Baboglo
- (Poland) Karol Świderski

1 goal

- (Albania) Kristjan Asllani
- (Albania) Sokol Cikalleshi
- (Albania) Mirlind Daku
- (Albania) Ernest Muçi
- (Czech Republic) Tomáš Chorý
- (Czech Republic) Tomáš Čvančara
- (Czech Republic) David Douděra
- (Czech Republic) Jan Kuchta
- (Faroe Islands) Mads Boe Mikkelsen
- (Faroe Islands) Odmar Færø
- (Moldova) Vadim Rață
- (Poland) Adam Buksa
- (Poland) Arkadiusz Milik
- (Poland) Jakub Piotrowski
- (Poland) Damian Szymański
- (Poland) Sebastian Szymański

== Discipline ==
A player was automatically suspended for the next match for the following offences:

- Receiving a red card (red card suspensions could be extended for serious offences)
- Receiving three yellow cards in three different matches, as well as after fifth and any subsequent yellow card (yellow card suspensions could be carried forward to the play-offs, but not the finals or any other future international matches)

The following suspensions were served during the qualifying matches:

Team	Player	Offence(s)	Suspended for match(es)
Czech Republic	Mojmír Chytil	(yellow card) (yellow-red card) vs Albania (12 October 2023)	vs Poland (17 November 2023)
Faroe Islands	Hørður Askham	(red card) vs Poland (12 October 2023)	vs Czech Republic (15 October 2023)
