= 2026 FIFA World Cup qualification – UEFA Group L =

Association football tournament group

The 2026 FIFA World Cup qualification UEFA Group L was one of the twelve UEFA groups in the World Cup qualification tournament to decide which teams would qualify for the 2026 FIFA World Cup final tournament in Canada, Mexico and the United States. Group L consisted of five teams: Croatia, the Czech Republic, the Faroe Islands, Gibraltar and Montenegro. The teams played against each other home-and-away in a round-robin format from March to November 2025. However, as Croatia were involved in the Nations League A quarter-finals in March, they began their qualifying campaign in June 2025.

The group winners, Croatia, qualified directly for the World Cup finals, while the runners-up, the Czech Republic, advanced to the second round (play-offs).

== Standings ==
Pos	Team	Pld	W	D	L	GF	GA	GD	Pts	Qualification	(Croatia national football team)	(Czech Republic national football team)	(Faroe Islands national football team)	(Montenegro national football team)	(Gibraltar national football team)
1	Croatia	8	7	1	0	26	4	+22	22	Qualification for 2026 FIFA World Cup	—	5–1	3–1	4–0	3–0
2	Czech Republic	8	5	1	2	18	8	+10	16	Advance to play-offs	0–0	—	2–1	2–0	6–0
3	Faroe Islands	8	4	0	4	11	9	+2	12		0–1	2–1	—	4–0	2–1
4	Montenegro	8	3	0	5	8	17	−9	9		2–3	0–2	1–0	—	3–1
5	Gibraltar	8	0	0	8	3	28	−25	0		0–7	0–4	0–1	1–2	—

Source: FIFA, UEFA
Rules for classification: Tiebreakers

== Matches ==
The fixture list was confirmed by UEFA on 13 December 2024 following the draw. Times are CET/CEST, (Note: CET (UTC+1) for matches until 29 March and from 26 October (matchday 1–2 and 9–10), and CEST (UTC+2) for matches from 30 March to 25 October 2025 (matchday 3–8).) as listed by UEFA (local times, if different, are in parentheses).

22 March 2025
18:00

Montenegro	3–1	Gibraltar
Jovetić 22'; Tući 70'; Marušić 73'	Report (FIFA); Report (UEFA)	Bent 13'

Gradski stadion, Nikšić
Attendance: 3,021
Referee: António Nobre (Portugal)
22 March 2025
20:45

Czech Republic	2–1	Faroe Islands
Schick 25', 85'	Report (FIFA); Report (UEFA)	Vatnhamar 83'

Malšovická aréna, Hradec Králové
Attendance: 8,978
Referee: Rade Obrenović (Slovenia)

25 March 2025
20:45 (19:45 UTC+0)

Gibraltar	0–4	Czech Republic
	Report (FIFA); Report (UEFA)	Černý 21'; Schick 50'; Šulc 72'; Kliment 90+5'

Estádio Algarve, Faro/Loulé (Portugal) (Note: Gibraltar played two home matches at Estádio Algarve, Faro/Loulé, Portugal, due to the redevelopment of their regular stadium Victoria Stadium, Gibraltar.)
Attendance: 583
Referee: Horațiu Feșnic (Romania)
25 March 2025
20:45

Montenegro	1–0	Faroe Islands
Kuč 90+6'	Report (FIFA); Report (UEFA)

Gradski stadion, Nikšić
Attendance: 3,226
Referee: Allard Lindhout (Netherlands)

6 June 2025
20:45

Czech Republic	2–0	Montenegro
Hložek 23'; Schick 65'	Report (FIFA); Report (UEFA)

Doosan Arena, Plzeň
Attendance: 10,889
Referee: Serdar Gözübüyük (Netherlands)
6 June 2025
20:45 (19:45 UTC+1)

Gibraltar	0–7	Croatia
	Report (FIFA); Report (UEFA)	Pašalić 28'; Budimir 30'; Ivanović 60', 63'; Perišić 73'; Kramarić 77', 79'

Estádio Algarve, Faro/Loulé (Portugal)
Attendance: 1,516
Referee: Georgi Kabakov (Bulgaria)

9 June 2025
20:45 (19:45 UTC+1)

Faroe Islands	2–1	Gibraltar
Frederiksberg 71'; Johannesen 86'	Report (FIFA); Report (UEFA)	J. Scanlon 23'

Tórsvøllur, Tórshavn
Attendance: 2,632
Referee: Yigal Frid (Israel)
9 June 2025
20:45

Croatia	5–1	Czech Republic
Kramarić 42', 75'; Modrić 62' (pen.); Perišić 68'; Budimir 72' (pen.)	Report (FIFA); Report (UEFA)	Souček 58'

Opus Arena, Osijek
Attendance: 12,207
Referee: Jesús Gil Manzano (Spain)

5 September 2025
20:45 (19:45 UTC+1)

Faroe Islands	0–1	Croatia
	Report (FIFA); Report (UEFA)	Kramarić 31'

Tórsvøllur, Tórshavn
Attendance: 4,632
Referee: Kristo Tohver (Estonia)
5 September 2025
20:45

Montenegro	0–2	Czech Republic
	Report (FIFA); Report (UEFA)	Červ 3'; Černý 90+6'

Podgorica City Stadium, Podgorica
Attendance: 6,315
Referee: Marco Guida (Italy)

8 September 2025
20:45

Gibraltar	0–1	Faroe Islands
	Report (FIFA); Report (UEFA)	Agnarsson 68'

Europa Sports Park, Gibraltar
Attendance: 1,603
Referee: Mohammed Al-Hakim (Sweden)
8 September 2025
20:45

Croatia	4–0	Montenegro
Jakić 35'; Kramarić 51'; Kuč 85' (o.g.); Perišić 90+2'	Report (FIFA); Report (UEFA)

Stadion Maksimir, Zagreb
Attendance: 21,209
Referee: Felix Zwayer (Germany)

9 October 2025
20:45

Czech Republic	0–0	Croatia
	Report (FIFA); Report (UEFA)

Fortuna Arena, Prague
Attendance: 18,870
Referee: François Letexier (France)
9 October 2025
20:45 (19:45 UTC+1)

Faroe Islands	4–0	Montenegro
Sørensen 16', 55'; Roganović 36' (o.g.); Frederiksberg 72' (pen.)	Report (FIFA); Report (UEFA)

Tórsvøllur, Tórshavn
Attendance: 2,034
Referee: Javier Alberola Rojas (Spain)

12 October 2025
18:00 (17:00 UTC+1)

Faroe Islands	2–1	Czech Republic
Sørensen 67'; Agnarsson 81'	Report (FIFA); Report (UEFA)	Karabec 78'

Tórsvøllur, Tórshavn
Attendance: 2,980
Referee: Andrea Colombo (Italy)
12 October 2025
20:45

Croatia	3–0	Gibraltar
Fruk 30'; L. Sučić 78'; Erlić 90+6'	Report (FIFA); Report (UEFA)

Stadion Varteks, Varaždin
Attendance: 7,579
Referee: Oleksii Derevinskyi (Ukraine)

14 November 2025
20:45

Gibraltar	1–2	Montenegro
Jessop 20'	Report (FIFA); Report (UEFA)	Adžić 33'; Krstović 42' (pen.)

Europa Sports Park, Gibraltar
Attendance: 668
Referee: Anastasios Papapetrou (Greece)
14 November 2025
20:45

Croatia	3–1	Faroe Islands
Gvardiol 23'; Musa 57'; Vlašić 70'	Report (FIFA); Report (UEFA)	Turi 16'

Stadion Rujevica, Rijeka
Attendance: 7,846
Referee: Aliyar Aghayev (Azerbaijan)

17 November 2025
20:45

Czech Republic	6–0	Gibraltar
Douděra 5'; Chorý 18'; Coufal 32'; Karabec 39'; Souček 44'; Hranáč 51'	Report (FIFA); Report (UEFA)

Andrův stadion, Olomouc
Attendance: 6,587
Referee: Sascha Stegemann (Germany)
17 November 2025
20:45

Montenegro	2–3	Croatia
Osmajić 3'; Krstović 17'	Report (FIFA); Report (UEFA)	Perišić 37' (pen.); Jakić 72'; Vlašić 87'

Podgorica City Stadium, Podgorica
Attendance: 4,673
Referee: Halil Umut Meler (Turkey)

== Goalscorers ==
There were 66 goals scored in 20 matches, for an average of 3.3 goals per match.

6 goals

- (Croatia national football team) Andrej Kramarić

4 goals

- (Croatia national football team) Ivan Perišić
- (Czech Republic national football team) Patrik Schick

3 goals

- (Faroe Islands national football team) Hanus Sørensen

2 goals

- (Croatia national football team) Ante Budimir
- (Croatia national football team) Franjo Ivanović
- (Croatia national football team) Kristijan Jakić
- (Croatia national football team) Nikola Vlašić
- (Czech Republic national football team) Václav Černý
- (Czech Republic national football team) Adam Karabec
- (Czech Republic national football team) Tomáš Souček
- (Faroe Islands national football team) Martin Agnarsson
- (Faroe Islands national football team) Árni Frederiksberg
- (Montenegro national football team) Nikola Krstović

1 goal

- (Croatia national football team) Martin Erlić
- (Croatia national football team) Toni Fruk
- (Croatia national football team) Joško Gvardiol
- (Croatia national football team) Luka Modrić
- (Croatia national football team) Petar Musa
- (Croatia national football team) Mario Pašalić
- (Croatia national football team) Luka Sučić
- (Czech Republic national football team) Lukáš Červ
- (Czech Republic national football team) Tomáš Chorý
- (Czech Republic national football team) Vladimír Coufal
- (Czech Republic national football team) David Douděra
- (Czech Republic national football team) Adam Hložek
- (Czech Republic national football team) Robin Hranáč
- (Czech Republic national football team) Jan Kliment
- (Czech Republic national football team) Pavel Šulc
- (Faroe Islands national football team) Patrik Johannesen
- (Faroe Islands national football team) Géza Dávid Turi
- (Faroe Islands national football team) Gunnar Vatnhamar
- (Gibraltar national football team) Dan Bent
- (Gibraltar national football team) Liam Jessop
- (Gibraltar national football team) James Scanlon
- (Montenegro national football team) Vasilije Adžić
- (Montenegro national football team) Stevan Jovetić
- (Montenegro national football team) Edvin Kuč
- (Montenegro national football team) Adam Marušić
- (Montenegro national football team) Milutin Osmajić
- (Montenegro national football team) Marko Tući

1 own goal

- (Montenegro national football team) Edvin Kuč (against Croatia)
- (Montenegro national football team) Milan Roganović (against Faroe Islands)

== Discipline ==
A player or team official was automatically suspended for the next match for the following offences:

- Receiving a red card (red card suspensions could be extended for serious offences)
- Receiving two yellow cards in two different matches (yellow card suspensions were carried forward to the play-offs, but not the finals or any other future international matches)

The following suspensions were served during the qualifying matches:

Team	Player	Offence(s)	Suspended for match(es)
Czech Republic	Vladimír Coufal	(yellow card) vs Montenegro (6 June 2025); (yellow card) vs Croatia (9 June 2025)	vs Montenegro (5 September 2025)
Czech Republic	Ladislav Krejčí	(yellow card) vs Montenegro (5 September 2025); (yellow card) vs Faroe Islands (12 October 2025)	vs Gibraltar (17 November 2025)
Faroe Islands	Odmar Færø	(yellow card) vs Czech Republic (22 March 2025); (yellow card) vs Croatia (5 September 2025)	vs Gibraltar (8 September 2025)
Faroe Islands	Jóannes Danielsen	(yellow card) vs Czech Republic (22 March 2025); (yellow card) vs Czech Republic (12 October 2025)	vs Croatia (14 November 2025)
Gibraltar	Dan Bent	(yellow card) vs Montenegro (22 March 2025); (yellow card) vs Faroe Islands (9 June 2025)	vs Faroe Islands (8 September 2025)
Gibraltar	Louie Annesley	(yellow card) vs Czech Republic (25 March 2025); (yellow card) vs Montenegro (14 November 2025)	vs Czech Republic (17 November 2025)
Montenegro	Marko Vešović	(yellow card) vs Faroe Islands (25 March 2025); (yellow card) vs Czech Republic (6 June 2025)	vs Czech Republic (5 September 2025)
Montenegro	Marko Janković	(yellow card) vs Gibraltar (22 March 2025); (yellow card) vs Czech Republic (6 June 2025)	vs Croatia (8 September 2025)
Montenegro	Andrija Bulatović	(yellow card) (yellow-red card) vs Croatia (8 September 2025)	vs Faroe Islands (9 October 2025)

== Incidents ==
Groups of Croatian fans were attacked on 16 November 2025 in Montenegro, between Budva and Cetinje, on the way to a match in Podgorica. On the match day, around 600 Croatian fans were escorted to the stadium under heavy security measures ahead of the match.
