= Andreas Olsen =

Andreas Olsen may refer to:

- Andreas Olsen (footballer, born 1987), Faroese footballer
- Andreas Hanche-Olsen (born 1997), Danish footballer
- Andreas Skov Olsen (born 1999), Danish footballer
