= 2020–21 UEFA Nations League D =

Tournament details
- Dates: 3 September – 17 November 2020
- Teams: 7
- Promoted: Faroe Islands; Gibraltar

Tournament statistics
- Matches played: 18
- Goals scored: 32 (1.78 per match)
- Attendance: 2,218 (123 per match)
- Top scorer: (Faroe Islands) Klæmint Olsen (4 goals)

The 2020–21 UEFA Nations League D was the fourth and lowest division of the 2020–21 edition of the UEFA Nations League, the second season of the international football competition involving the men's national teams of the 55 member associations of UEFA.

== Format ==
Following a format change from the first season, League D was reduced from 16 to 7 teams. The league consisted of the lowest ranked UEFA members from 49–55 in the 2018–19 UEFA Nations League overall ranking, who were split into two groups (one group of four teams and one group of three teams). Each team played four or six matches within their group, using the home-and-away round-robin format on double matchdays in September, October, and November 2020. The winners of both groups were promoted to the 2022–23 UEFA Nations League C.

== Teams ==
=== Team changes ===
The following were the team changes of League D from the 2018–19 season:

Outgoing
Promoted to Nations League C
Group winners: Belarus; Georgia; Kosovo; North Macedonia	Following format change: Armenia; Azerbaijan; Kazakhstan; Luxembourg; Moldova

The following team changes were initially set to occur in League D, but did not after no teams were relegated due to the format change by UEFA:

Incoming
Initially relegated from
Nations League C
- Cyprus
- Estonia
- Lithuania
- Slovenia

=== Seeding ===
In the 2020–21 access list, UEFA ranked teams based on the 2018–19 Nations League overall ranking. The seeding pots for the league phase were confirmed 4 December 2019, and were based on the access list ranking.

Pot 1
Team	Rank
Gibraltar	49
Faroe Islands	50
Latvia	51
Liechtenstein	52

Pot 2
Team	Rank
Andorra	53
Malta	54
San Marino	55

The draw for the league phase took place at the Beurs van Berlage Conference Centre in Amsterdam, Netherlands on 3 March 2020, 18:00 CET. Group D1 contained two teams from Pot 1 and two teams from Pot 2, while Group D2 contained two teams from Pot 1 and one team from Pot 2.

== Groups ==
The original fixture list was confirmed by UEFA on 3 March 2020 following the draw. On 17 June 2020, the UEFA Executive Committee adjusted the league phase schedule for October and November 2020 to allow for the completion of the UEFA Euro 2020 qualifying play-offs. Following the change, a revised schedule for the October and November 2020 fixtures was released by UEFA on 26 June 2020.

Times are CET/CEST, (Note: CEST (UTC+2) for matchdays 1–4 (September and October 2020), CET (UTC+1) for matchdays 5–6 (November 2020).) as listed by UEFA (local times, if different, are in parentheses).

=== Group 1 ===
Pos	Team	Pld	W	D	L	GF	GA	GD	Pts	Promotion	(Faroe Islands)	(Malta)	(Latvia)	(Andorra)
1	Faroe Islands (P)	6	3	3	0	9	5	+4	12	Promotion to League C	—	3–2	1–1	2–0
2	Malta	6	2	3	1	8	6	+2	9		1–1	—	1–1	3–1
3	Latvia	6	1	4	1	8	4	+4	7		1–1	0–1	—	0–0
4	Andorra	6	0	2	4	1	11	−10	2		0–1	0–0	0–5	—

Source: UEFA
Rules for classification: Tiebreakers
(P) Promoted
3 September 2020
18:00 (19:00 UTC+3)

Latvia	0–0	Andorra
	Report

Daugava Stadium, Riga
Attendance: 0 (Note: Due to the COVID-19 pandemic in Europe, all matches scheduled for September 2020 were played behind closed doors.)
Referee: Timotheos Christofi (Cyprus)
3 September 2020
20:45 (19:45 UTC+1)

Faroe Islands	3–2	Malta
K. Olsen 25'; A. Olsen 87'; Hendriksson 90+1'	Report	Degabriele 37'; Agius 73'

Tórsvøllur, Tórshavn
Attendance: 0
Referee: Ádám Farkas (Hungary)

6 September 2020
15:00

Andorra	0–1	Faroe Islands
	Report	K. Olsen 31'

Estadi Nacional, Andorra la Vella
Attendance: 0
Referee: Harald Lechner (Austria)
6 September 2020
20:45

Malta	1–1	Latvia
Nwoko 15'	Report	Guillaumier 25' (o.g.)

National Stadium, Ta' Qali
Attendance: 0
Referee: Stéphanie Frappart (France)

10 October 2020
18:00 (17:00 UTC+1)

Faroe Islands	1–1	Latvia
Færø 28'	Report	J. Ikaunieks 25'

Tórsvøllur, Tórshavn
Attendance: 447
Referee: Ivaylo Stoyanov (Bulgaria)
10 October 2020
20:45

Andorra	0–0	Malta
	Report

Estadi Nacional, Andorra la Vella
Attendance: 0 (Note: Due to the COVID-19 pandemic in Europe, the match was played behind closed doors.)
Referee: Alain Durieux (Luxembourg)

13 October 2020
18:00 (19:00 UTC+3)

Latvia	0–1	Malta
	Report	Borg 90+7'

Daugava Stadium, Riga
Attendance: 953
Referee: Iwan Arwel Griffith (Wales)
13 October 2020
20:45 (19:45 UTC+1)

Faroe Islands	2–0	Andorra
K. Olsen 19', 33'	Report

Tórsvøllur, Tórshavn
Attendance: 412
Referee: Antti Munukka (Finland)

14 November 2020
15:00

Malta	3–1	Andorra
E. García 56' (o.g.); Degabriele 59'; Dimech 90+3'	Report	Rebés 3'

National Stadium, Ta' Qali
Attendance: 0
Referee: Peter Kralović (Slovakia)
14 November 2020
18:00 (19:00 UTC+2)

Latvia	1–1	Faroe Islands
Kamešs 59'	Report	G. Vatnhamar 60'

Daugava Stadium, Riga
Attendance: 0
Referee: Nikola Dabanović (Montenegro)

17 November 2020
20:45

Andorra	0–5	Latvia
	Report	Černomordijs 6'; J. Ikaunieks 57', 60'; Gutkovskis 70' (pen.); Krollis 90' (pen.)

Estadi Nacional, Andorra la Vella
Attendance: 0
Referee: Dimitar Meckarovski (North Macedonia)
17 November 2020
20:45

Malta	1–1	Faroe Islands
Guillaumier 54'	Report	Jónsson 70'

National Stadium, Ta' Qali
Attendance: 0
Referee: Kristo Tohver (Estonia)

=== Group 2 ===
Pos	Team	Pld	W	D	L	GF	GA	GD	Pts	Promotion	(Gibraltar)	(Liechtenstein)	(San Marino)
1	Gibraltar (P)	4	2	2	0	3	1	+2	8	Promotion to League C	—	1–1	1–0
2	Liechtenstein	4	1	2	1	3	2	+1	5		0–1	—	0–0
3	San Marino	4	0	2	2	0	3	−3	2		0–0	0–2	—

Source: UEFA
Rules for classification: Tiebreakers
(P) Promoted
5 September 2020
15:00

Gibraltar	1–0	San Marino
Torrilla 42'	Report

Victoria Stadium, Gibraltar
Attendance: 0
Referee: Aleksandrs Anufrijevs (Latvia)

8 September 2020
20:45

San Marino	0–2	Liechtenstein
	Report	Hasler 3' (pen.); Y. Frick 14'

Stadio Romeo Neri, Rimini (Italy) (Note: The San Marino v Liechtenstein match, originally scheduled to be played at San Marino Stadium, Serravalle, was later moved to Stadio Romeo Neri, Rimini in Italy. The late move came after the Swiss Federal Office of Public Health, which Liechtenstein follows for anti-contagion measures, as of 7 September 2020 included San Marino among the countries for which there is a mandatory quarantine period upon re-entry into one's own state. The match was therefore moved to Italy, in nearby Rimini.)
Attendance: 50
Referee: Enea Jorgji (Albania)

10 October 2020
18:00

Liechtenstein	0–1	Gibraltar
	Report	De Barr 10'

Rheinpark Stadion, Vaduz
Attendance: 178
Referee: Kirill Levnikov (Russia)

13 October 2020
20:45

Liechtenstein	0–0	San Marino
	Report

Rheinpark Stadion, Vaduz
Attendance: 178
Referee: Jørgen Daugbjerg Burchardt (Denmark)

14 November 2020
15:00

San Marino	0–0	Gibraltar
	Report

San Marino Stadium, Serravalle
Attendance: 0
Referee: Kateryna Monzul (Ukraine)

17 November 2020
20:45

Gibraltar	1–1	Liechtenstein
Frommelt 17' (o.g.)	Report	N. Frick 44'

Victoria Stadium, Gibraltar
Attendance: 0
Referee: Trustin Farrugia Cann (Malta)

== Goalscorers ==
There were 32 goals scored in 18 matches, for an average of 1.78 goals per match.

4 goals

- (Faroe Islands) Klæmint Olsen

3 goals

- (Latvia) Jānis Ikaunieks

2 goals

- (Malta) Jurgen Degabriele

1 goal

- (Andorra) Marc Rebés
- (Faroe Islands) Odmar Færø
- (Faroe Islands) Brandur Hendriksson
- (Faroe Islands) Ári Jónsson
- (Faroe Islands) Andreas Olsen
- (Faroe Islands) Gunnar Vatnhamar
- (Gibraltar) Tjay De Barr
- (Gibraltar) Graeme Torrilla
- (Latvia) Antonijs Černomordijs
- (Latvia) Vladislavs Gutkovskis
- (Latvia) Vladimirs Kamešs
- (Latvia) Raimonds Krollis
- (Liechtenstein) Noah Frick
- (Liechtenstein) Yanik Frick
- (Liechtenstein) Nicolas Hasler
- (Malta) Andrei Agius
- (Malta) Steve Borg
- (Malta) Shaun Dimech
- (Malta) Matthew Guillaumier
- (Malta) Kyrian Nwoko

1 own goal

- (Andorra) Emili García (against Malta)
- (Liechtenstein) Noah Frommelt (against Gibraltar)
- (Malta) Matthew Guillaumier (against Latvia)

== Overall ranking ==
The seven League D teams were ranked 49th to 55th overall in the 2020–21 UEFA Nations League according to the following rules:

- The teams finishing first in the groups were ranked 49th to 50th according to the results of the league phase, not considering the results against the fourth-placed team.
- The teams finishing second in the groups were ranked 51st to 52nd according to the results of the league phase, not considering the results against the fourth-placed team.
- The teams finishing third in the groups were ranked 53rd to 54th according to the results of the league phase, not considering the results against the fourth-placed team.
- The team finishing fourth in Group D1 was ranked 55th.

Rnk	Grp	Team	Pld	W	D	L	GF	GA	GD	Pts
49	D2	Gibraltar	4	2	2	0	3	1	+2	8
50	D1	Faroe Islands	4	1	3	0	6	5	+1	6
51	D2	Liechtenstein	4	1	2	1	3	2	+1	5
52	D1	Malta	4	1	2	1	5	5	0	5
53	D1	Latvia	4	0	3	1	3	4	−1	3
54	D2	San Marino	4	0	2	2	0	3	−3	2
55	D1	Andorra	6	0	2	4	1	11	−10	2

Source: UEFA
Rules for classification: Ranking criteria
