= Matt Silva (soccer) =

Canadian soccer player

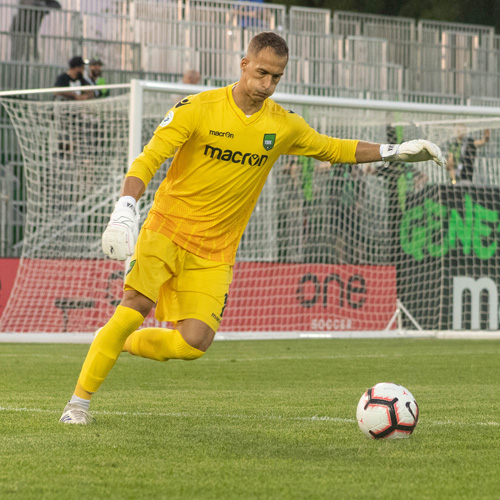
- Silva playing for York9 in 2019

Personal information
- Full name: Matthew Manuel Silva
- Date of birth: March 28, 1991 (age 35)
- Place of birth: Mississauga, Ontario, Canada
- Height: 1.85 m (6 ft 1 in)
- Position: Goalkeeper

Team information
- Current team: Lynx
- Number: 13

Youth career
- Toronto Lynx

College career
Years	Team	Apps	(Gls)
2010–2013	Le Moyne Dolphins	70	(0)

Senior career*
Years	Team	Apps	(Gls)
2010	Toronto Lynx	7	(0)
2011	SC Toronto		
2012–2013	Toronto Lynx	12	(0)
2014	North York Astros		
2015	Kaya	1	(0)
2016–2017	Bodens	42	(0)
2018	Österlen	26	(0)
2019	York9 FC	1	(0)
2020–2021	Valour FC	4	(0)
2022	United City	2	(0)
2022–2023	Bruno's Magpies	3	(0)
2023–2024	Espinho	1	(0)
2024	United City	3	(0)
2024	Loyola	1	(0)
2025–2026	Tanjong Pagar United	16	(0)
2026–	Lynx	1	(0)
- * Club domestic league appearances and goals as of 12 October 2026

Matthew Manuel Silva (born March 28, 1991) is a Canadian professional soccer player who currently plays as a goalkeeper for Gibraltar Football League club Lynx.

== College career ==
Silva spent four years playing college soccer at Le Moyne College, where he was the starting keeper for the Dolphins. In his first season, he was named Northeast-10 Conference rookie of the year and would go on to earn conference all-star honours three times.

== Club career ==
=== Semi-prof career ===
In 2010, Silva played in the USL Premier Development League with the Toronto Lynx, making seven appearances that season.

In 2011, he played in the Canadian Soccer League with SC Toronto, before returning to the Lynx in 2012, where he made five appearances that season and seven the following season.

In 2014, Silva played for North York Astros in the Canadian Soccer League.

=== Kaya ===
Silva signed his first professional contract with Kaya of the United Football League on 21 January2015. In the same season, he helped Kaya to win the UFL Cup on 28 August defeating Ceres in the final.

=== Bodens BK ===
In February 2016, Silva joined Swedish Division 2 club Bodens.

=== Österlen ===
In January 2018, Silva signed for Swedish Division 2 club Österlen. After the season, he trialed with Trelleborg and Mjällby but didn't signed a contract with any of the club.

=== York9 ===
Silva returned to Canada and signed for Canadian Premier League club York 9 FC on 1 February 2019. He made his debut for the club on July 17 against Pacific. York9 secured a 2–1 victory. Though expected to be the starting goalkeeper when he signed, Silva spent most of the 2019 season backing up first choice goalkeeper Nathan Ingham, and his debut against Pacific turned out to be his only game of the season. On 15 November 2019, the club announced that Silva would not be returning for the 2020 season.

=== Valour ===
On 16 June 2020, Valour FC announced they had signed Silva to a deal. He did not make an appearance in the shortened 2020 season, but was still re-signed for 2021. In 2021 he finally got to see the pitch for Valour, but was still the firm second choice goalkeeper behind Jonathan Sirois. Still, Silva wanted and believed he was capable of being a starting goalkeeper. However, all clubs in the league already had a set first choice keeper, so he decided he would have to leave Canada. In January 2022, Valour declined Silva's contract option for 2022.

=== United City ===
On 14 March 2022, Silva joined Philippines Football League club United City. With United City, he featured in the 2022 AFC Champions League, where he made one of the top five saves of the group stage making two appearances against Australian side Melbourne City and Korean club Jeonnam Dragons. However, his team was eliminated in the group stage. Despite this, he also experienced success with United City, featuring twice in the club's cup run that saw them win the Copa Paulino Alcantara for the first time in club history. Although happy with the trophy win, Silva would move on from the Philippines shortly after.

=== Bruno's Magpies ===
Shortly after departing United City, Silva signed with Gibraltarian side Bruno's Magpies, who were competing in the 2022–23 UEFA Europa Conference League qualifying phase. He participated in the European tournament and played in both matches against Crusaders in the first round of the qualifiers. Silva was on the bench where the team won the 2022–23 Rock Cup

=== Espinho ===
On 1 August 2023, Silva joined Portuguese side Espinho on a free transfer.

=== Second stint with United City ===
On 24 February 2024, Silva returned to his former club United City for his third run in the Philippines Football League for the 2024 season.

=== Loyola ===
In October 2024, Silva signed with Loyola. He make his debut for the club on 19 October in a 3–2 win over Mendiola 1991.

=== Tanjong Pagar United ===
On 31 December 2024, Silva signed a contract with Singapore Premier League club Tanjong Pagar United.

=== Lynx ===
In 2026 Silva returned to Gibraltar to join Lynx, making his debut on 12 October 2026 in a 3–2 defeat to Mons Calpe.

== Career statistics ==
As of match played 25 May 2025

Appearances and goals by club, season and competition
Club	Season	League			Cup		Continental		Other		Total	
Club	Season	Division	Apps	Goals	Apps	Goals	Apps	Goals	Apps	Goals	Apps	Goals
York9 FC	2019	Canadian Premier League	1	0	0	0	0	0	0	0	1	0
York9 FC	Total		1	0	0	0	0	0	0	0	1	0
Valour FC	2020	Canadian Premier League	0	0	0	0	0	0	0	0	0	0
Valour FC	2021	Canadian Premier League	4	0	2	0	0	0	0	0	6	0
Valour FC	Total		4	0	2	0	0	0	0	0	6	0
United City	2022–23	Philippines Football League	0	0	2	0	2	0	0	0	4	0
United City	Total		0	0	2	0	2	0	0	0	4	0
Magpies	2022–23	Gibraltar Football League	4	0	2	0	2	0	0	0	8	0
Magpies	2023–24	Gibraltar Football League	0	0	0	0	0	0	0	0	0	0
Magpies	Total		4	0	2	0	2	0	0	0	8	0
S.C. Espinho	2023–24	AF Aveiro Campeonato Sabseg	0	0	0	0	0	0	0	0	0	0
S.C. Espinho	Total		0	0	0	0	0	0	0	0	0	0
United City	2024	Philippines Football League	3	0	0	0	0	0	0	0	3	0
United City	Total		3	0	0	0	0	0	0	0	3	0
Loyola	2024–25	Philippines Football League	1	0	0	0	0	0	0	0	1	0
Loyola	Total		1	0	0	0	0	0	0	0	1	0
Tanjong Pagar United	2024–25	Singapore Premier League	9	0	4	0	0	0	0	0	13	0
Tanjong Pagar United	Total		9	0	4	0	0	0	0	0	13	0
Career total			22	0	10	0	4	0	0	0	36	0

== Honours ==
=== Club ===
==== Kaya ====
- UFL Cup: 2015

==== United City ====
- Copa Paulino Alcantara: 2022

==== Bruno's Magpies ====
- Rock Cup: 2022–23

=== Individual ===
- Northeast-10 Rookie of the Year: 2010
