= Ári Jónsson =

Faroese footballer

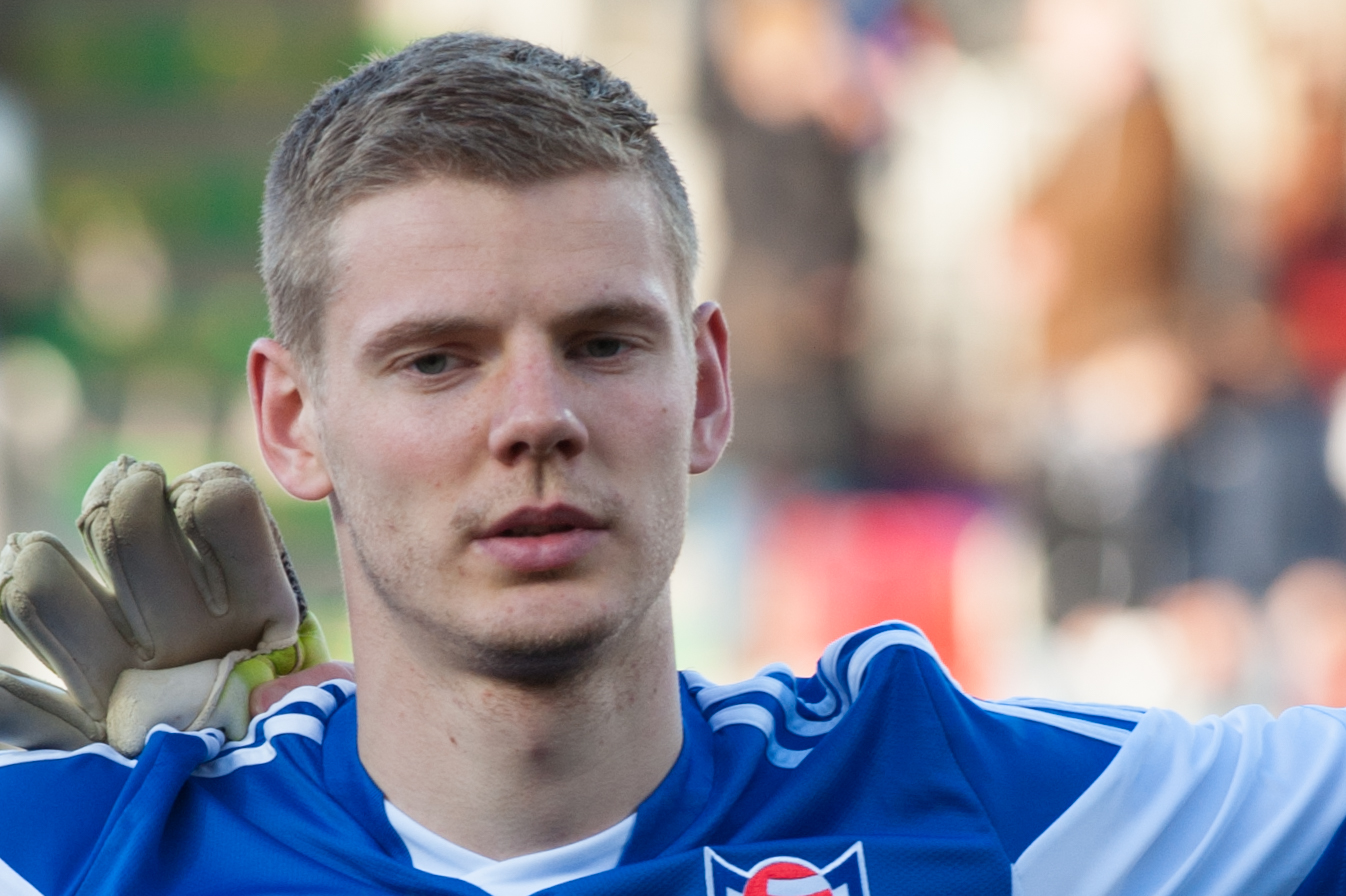

Personal information
- Full name: Ári Mohr Jónsson
- Date of birth: 22 July 1994 (age 32)
- Position: Left-back

Team information
- Current team: HB Tórshavn
- Number: 22

Senior career*
Years	Team	Apps	(Gls)
2012–2016	Silkeborg	8	(0)
2016–2017	HB Tórshavn	41	(1)
2018–2021	Sandnes Ulf	67	(1)
2022–	HB Tórshavn	99	(7)

International career^{‡}
2009–2010	U17 Faroe Islands	13	(0)
2010–2011	U19 Faroe Islands	5	(2)
2014–2016	U21 Faroe Islands	7	(2)
2013–	Faroe Islands	19	(1)
- * Club domestic league appearances and goals as of 1 November 2026 ‡ National team caps and goals as of 21 July 2026

Ári Mohr Jónsson (born 22 July 1994) is a Faroese international footballer who plays for HB Tórshavn, as a left-back. He has also played for the Danish club Silkeborg and the Norwegian club Sandnes Ulf.

== Club career ==
Jónsson has played club football for Silkeborg and HB Tórshavn.

In January 2018, Jónsson signed for Norwegian club Sandnes Ulf in OBOS-ligaen.

== International career ==
He made his international debut for Faroe Islands in 2013.

On 17 November 2020, Jónsson scores his first international goal against Malta in the 2020–21 UEFA Nations League D match during a 1–1 draw.

== Career statistics ==
=== International ===
As of match played 15 October 2023

Appearances and goals by national team and year
National team	Year	Apps	Goals
Faroe Islands	2013	1	0
Faroe Islands	2014	1	0
Faroe Islands	2015	–	
Faroe Islands	2016	–	
Faroe Islands	2017	1	0
Faroe Islands	2018	–	
Faroe Islands	2019	1	0
Faroe Islands	2020	3	1
Faroe Islands	2021	4	0
Faroe Islands	2022	4	0
Faroe Islands	2023	4	0
Total		19	1

Scores and results list the Faroe Islands' goal tally first, score column indicates score after each Jónsson goal.

List of international goals scored by Ári Jónsson
No.	Date	Venue	Opponent	Score	Result	Competition
1	17 November 2020	National Stadium, Ta' Qali, Malta	Malta	1–1	1–1	2020–21 UEFA Nations League D

== Personal life ==
Jónsson works as a Consultant in Betri Banki while also playing football.
