= Sykes Garro =

Gibraltarian footballer (born 1993)

Personal information
- Full name: Sykes Al Garro
- Date of birth: 26 February 1993 (age 33)
- Place of birth: Gibraltar
- Positions: Midfielder; striker

Team information
- Current team: Europa Point
- Number: 23

Youth career
- –2010: Lions Gibraltar

Senior career*
Years	Team	Apps	(Gls)
2010–2011	Lions Pilots		
2012–2016	Lions Gibraltar	36	(2)
2016–2018	Europa	32	(5)
2018–2019	Lincoln Red Imps	8	(0)
2019–2022	St Joseph's	34	(4)
2022–2023	Lions Gibraltar	11	(1)
2023–2025	Mons Calpe	17	(0)
2026–	Europa Point	4	(0)

International career^{‡}
2015	Gibraltar development squad	3	(0)
2016–2018	Gibraltar	3	(0)
- * Club domestic league appearances and goals as of 20 November 2026 ‡ National team caps and goals as of 9 September 2018

Sykes Al Garro (born 26 February 1993) is a Gibraltarian footballer who plays as a forward for Europa Point.

== Club career ==
A product of Lions Gibraltar's youth system, Garro began his senior career at the club's feeder team, Lions Pilots. In 2011 he left Gibraltar to study at Northumbria University, although in 2012 he signed a contract at Lions Gibraltar so he remained registered at the club until his return in 2014. He played a total of 36 games over two seasons, helping the side to a 4th place finish in the 2015–16 season. His performances for Lions attracted the attention of regular title challengers Europa, who signed him as one of a number of new Gibraltarian signings to bolster the squad ahead of the new season, in order to comply with new GFA rules on home grown players. He played 15 times (primarily as a substitute), scoring twice, as Europa won the 2016–17 Gibraltar Premier Division. He became a more regular starting feature the following season after the departure of Liam Walker, scoring 3 times in 17 games as Europa finished second in the league. His performances, however, attracted the attention of rivals Lincoln Red Imps, who signed him in June 2018. A year later, he signed for St Joseph's, and made his debut against Scottish giants Rangers on 18 July 2019.

== International career ==
Garro first played internationally for Gibraltar in a development team at the 2015 Island Games. After impressing at Europa, Garro received his first international callup in November 2016. He made his debut for the Gibraltar national football team on 13 November 2016, in a 3–1 loss against Cyprus.

== Honours ==
With Europa

- Gibraltar Premier Division: 2016–17
- Rock Cup: 2017, 2017–18
- Pepe Reyes Cup: 2016

With Lincoln Red Imps

- Gibraltar Premier Division: 2018–19
