= Nathan Rooney =

English football manager (born 1989)

Personal information
- Date of birth: 10 September 1989 (age 37)
- Place of birth: Blackburn, England

Youth career
- Years: Team
- Blackburn Rovers

Managerial career
- 2020–2021: Colne
- 2022–2023: Bruno's Magpies
- 2023: Espinho
- 2023–2024: FCB Magpies
- 2024: Larne
- 2025: Larne

Nathan Rooney (born 10 September 1989) is an English football manager. Who is currently Assistant Coach at Saudi Arabian club Al Qadsiah.

== Early life ==
Rooney was born in 1989 in Blackburn, England.

== Playing career ==
As a youth player, Rooney joined the youth academy of English side Blackburn Rovers.

== Managerial career ==
Rooney obtained a UEFA A License at the age of twenty-two. In 2020, after spells coaching academy sides of Blackburn Rovers and Fleetwood Town, as well as serving as an assistant coach at Crawley Town, Carlisle United and the Gibraltar national football team, Rooney was appointed manager of English side Colne.

In January 2022, he was appointed manager of Gibraltarian side Bruno's Magpies. He oversaw an upturn in form that saw the club secure UEFA Europa Conference League qualification for the first time by finishing 4th. After another season of improvement culminating in a 3rd place finish and the club winning the 2022–23 Rock Cup in his first full campaign, he resigned in May 2023 to take over Portuguese club Espinho. However, he returned to the rebranded FCB Magpies later in the summer, without managing a competitive game for Espinho. His first game back in charge saw the Magpies secure their first Pepe Reyes Cup, the traditional curtain raiser for the season between the previous season's league champions and cup winners. The season ended with another third place finish, securing another season of European football. They made headlines after a shock extra-time victory against League of Ireland Premier Division side Derry City in July 2024 set up a tie against Danish giants Copenhagen, which they lost 8–1 on aggregate despite taking an early lead in Denmark through Olatunde Bayode.

In November 2024, Rooney was linked with the vacant position in charge of NIFL Premiership champions Larne, following the loss of Tiernan Lynch to Derry City. After missing Magpies' 7-0 win over Europa Point, for which assistant Mason McClelland took over, he was officially unveiled by the Invermen on 25 November. However, his reign was cut short when it was found that he lacked the sufficient license to serve as manager. He instead moved to the role of Head of Football for the remainder of the 2024–25 season, becoming manager once again in May 2025 after enrolling on the UEFA Pro Licence course. Rooney led Larne into 2025-26, a season in which they won their third league title in four seasons.

== Personal life ==
Rooney is married to Cymru and Sunderland defender Rhiannon Roberts. The couple's wedding day celebrations, which included a 5-a-side girls vs boys football match, went viral online in 2022.

== Managerial statistics ==
As of 5 October 2025

Managerial record by team and tenure
Team	From	To	Record								Ref.
Team	From	To	P	W	D	L	GF	GA	GD	Win %	Ref.
Bruno Magpies	13 January 2022	17 May 2023	41	25	6	10	78	37	+41	60.98	
Bruno Magpies	1 September 2023	24 November 2024	42	23	5	14	91	62	+29	54.76	
Larne	25 November 2024	12 December 2024	3	0	1	2	1	4	−3	0.00	
Larne	25 May 2025	18 August 2025	7	0	5	2	3	7	−4	0.00	
Total			93	48	17	28	173	110	+63	51.61	

== Honours ==
FCB Magpies

- Rock Cup: 2022–23
- Pepe Reyes Cup: 2023
