= Martin Agnarsson =

Faroese footballer (born 2003)

Personal information
- Full name: Martin Agnarsson
- Date of birth: 7 December 2003 (age 22)
- Place of birth: Tórshavn, Faroe Islands
- Height: 1.72 m (5 ft 8 in)
- Position: Left-back

Team information
- Current team: Aarhus Fremad
- Number: 3

Youth career
- B36

Senior career*
Years	Team	Apps	(Gls)
2020–2022	B36	45	(5)
2022–2024	Viborg	2	(0)
2024–2026	Aarhus Fremad	56	(7)
2026-	Mjällby AIF	0	(0)

International career^{‡}
2019	Faroe Islands U-17	8	(0)
2021	Faroe Islands U-19	4	(0)
2022–	Faroe Islands U-21	2	(0)
2022–	Faroe Islands	16	(2)
- * Club domestic league appearances and goals as of 2 June 2026 ‡ National team caps and goals as of 16 November 2026

Martin Agnarsson (born 7 December 2003) is a Faroese professional footballer who plays as a left-back for Allsvenskan club Mjällby AIF and the Faroe Islands national team.

== Club career ==
=== B36 ===
Agnarsson is a product of B36 Tórshavn, the team of his hometown Tórshavn. He came through the clubs youth ranks, and signed his first contract with the club in March 2020 at the age of 16, signing a two-year deal. Four months later, in July 2020, he made his first team debut for the club in a game against AB Argir. He made his breakthrough in 2021, becoming a regular starter: he ended the season with 27 appearances though his young age.

=== Viborg FF ===
At the end of August 2022, after being spotted during a Conference League between B36 Tórshavn and Viborg FF, the Danish Superliga club announced the official signing of Agnarsson on 1 September 2022, with the player signing a three-year deal.

On 19 October 2022 Agnarsson made his debut for Viborg in a Danish Cup game against Ishøj IF. A few days later, on 24 October 2022, he also made his debut in the Danish Superliga, coming on in the final minutes against AaB to replace an injured Oliver Bundgaard. But after an unfortunate collision with a teammate, Agnarsson had to sit out for a long time with a broken collarbone and was not cleared to play until the end of May 2023. In July 2023, he again faced a lengthy absence: Agnarsson broke his collarbone again, resulting in surgery that would result in a 6-8 week break.

=== Aarhus Fremad ===
On 2 September 2024 the Danish 2nd Division club Aarhus Fremad confirmed that Agnarsson had joined the club.

=== Mjällby ===
On 10 July 2026, Agnarsson joined Allsvenskan side Mjällby AIF for a fee of €350,000, where he will play alongside international teammate Áki Samuelsen.

== International career ==
International goals

Scores and results list Faroe Islands' goal tally first.

No.	Date	Venue	Opponent	Score	Result	Competition
1.	8 September 2025	Europa Sports Park, Gibraltar	Gibraltar	1–0	1–0	2026 FIFA World Cup qualification
2.	12 October 2025	Tórsvøllur, Tórshavn, Faroe Islands	Czech Republic	2–1	2–1	2026 FIFA World Cup qualification

== Personal life ==
Martin Agnarsson is the younger brother of Hannes Agnarsson, who he played with at B36.
