= Emili García =

Andorran footballer

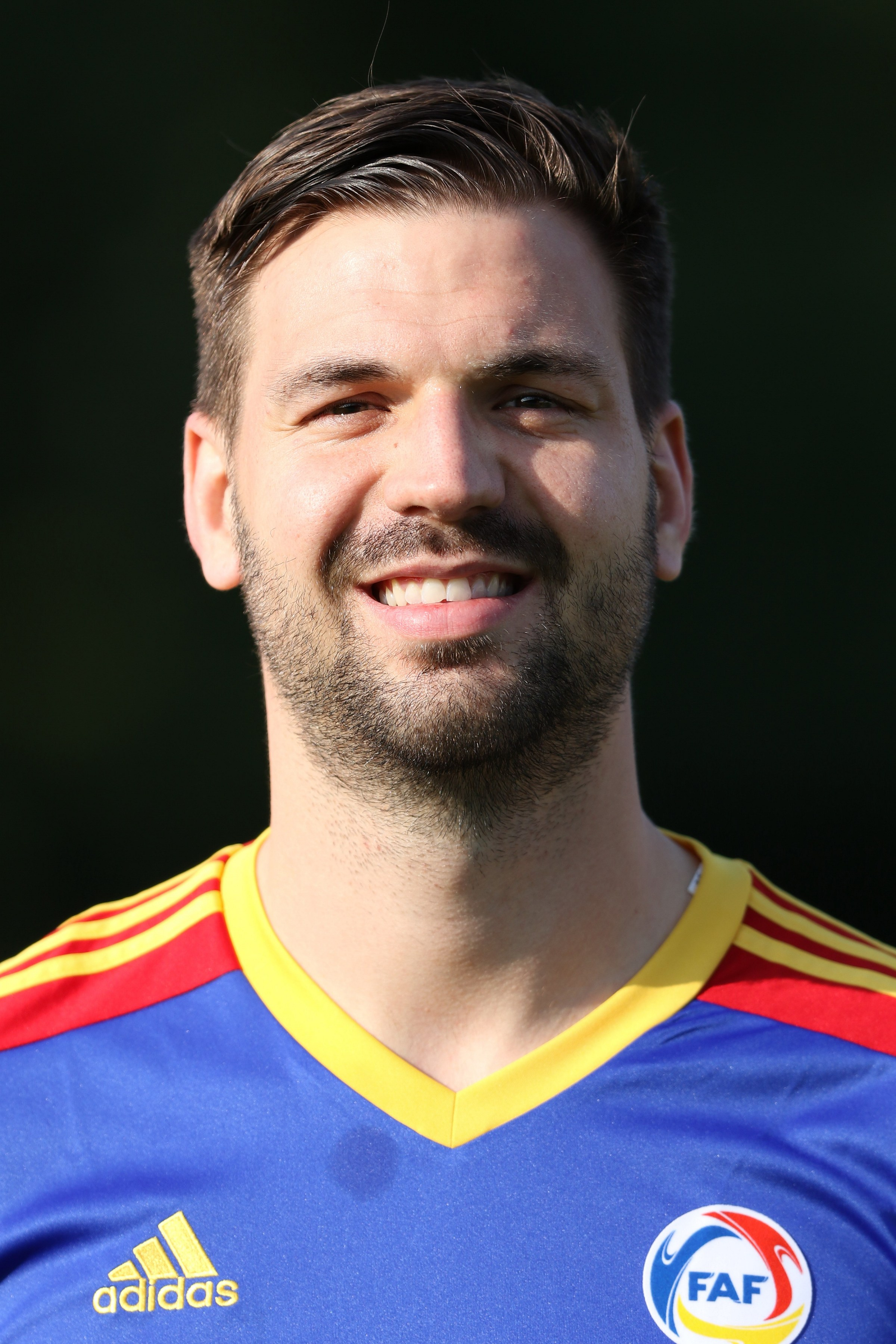
- Emili García before the game against Ukraine

Personal information
- Full name: Emili Josep García Miramontes
- Date of birth: 11 January 1989 (age 37)
- Place of birth: Andorra la Vella, Andorra
- Height: 1.88 m (6 ft 2 in)
- Position: Defender

Team information
- Current team: Pas de la Casa
- Number: 4

Senior career*
Years	Team	Apps	(Gls)
2006–2013	FC Andorra	184	(12)
2013–2014	Lermeño	24	(0)
2014–2015	Pennoise	4	(0)
2015	Le Pontet	1	(0)
2015–2019	FC Andorra	95	(6)
2019–2022	Inter d'Escaldes	64	(1)
2022–2023	UE Santa Coloma	16	(0)
2024–	Pas de la Casa	14	(0)

International career^{‡}
2008–	Andorra	57	(1)
- * Club domestic league appearances and goals as of 10 February 2025 ‡ National team caps and goals as of 12 October 2021

Emili Josep García Miramontes (born 11 January 1989) is an Andorran international footballer. He currently plays as a defender for Pas de la Casa. García made his international debut in 2008.

== International career ==
García made his senior international debut on 4 June 2008 in a 2–1 friendly defeat to Azerbaijan.
