= Mads Boe Mikkelsen =

Faroese footballer (born 1999)

Personal information
- Date of birth: 11 December 1999 (age 26)
- Place of birth: Denmark
- Height: 1.79 m (5 ft 10 in)
- Position: Attacking midfielder

Team information
- Current team: KÍ Klaksvík
- Number: 6

Youth career
- 2004-2010: Kolt-Hasselager
- 2010–2018: AGF

Senior career*
Years	Team	Apps	(Gls)
2018–2020	Vendsyssel	10	(1)
2020–2022	HB Tórshavn	28	(1)
2022–2026	KÍ Klaksvík	118	(19)
2026–	Aarhus Fremad	0	(0)

International career^{‡}
2015–2016	Denmark U17	13	(2)
2016	Denmark U18	2	(0)
2019–2020	Faroe Islands U21	5	(1)
2022–	Faroe Islands	7	(1)
- * Club domestic league appearances and goals as of 26 October 2025 ‡ National team caps and goals as of 00:07, 25 March 2023 (UTC)

Mads Boe Mikkelsen (born 11 December 1999) is a Faroese-Danish professional football player who plays for Aarhus Fremad. Born in Denmark, he plays for the Faroe Islands national team.

== Career ==
Mikkelsen has his football upbringing in Aarhus, AGF where he came to the club at an age of 11 years. Mads Mikkelsen started playing football in a small club from the suburb of Aarhus, Kolt-Hasselager. Mads Mikkelsen signed his first contract at an age of 16 years, a youth contract lasting three years with Aarhus, AGF. After his contract expired he signed a four-year professional deal with Vendsyssel FF.

On 6 August 2018, Mikkelsen made his Superliga debut appearing as a substitute against FC Nordsjælland. Four days later on 10 August 2018, Mikkelsen made his first start and scored his first league goal, netting the opener in a 1–1 draw at home against Vejle Boldklub.

Mikkelsen left Vendsyssel for the Faroe Islands in 2020. He spent 6 years playing there (2 for Havnar Bóltfelag and 4 for Klaksvíkar Ítróttarfelag) before returning to Denmark in March 2026, signing for Aarhus Fremad.

== International career ==
Mikkelsen was born in Denmark, and is of Faroese descent through his mother. He is a youth international for Denmark, having represented the Denmark U17s before switching to represent the Faroe Islands U21s. He was called up to represent the Faroe Islands national team for UEFA Nations League matches in June 2022. He scored his first senior international goal for the Faroes on 24 March 2023, in a 1-1 2024 UEFA European Championship qualifying match against Moldova.

== International goals ==
List of international goals scored by Mads Boe Mikkelsen
No.	Date	Venue	Cap	Opponent	Score	Result	Competition
1	24 March 2023	Zimbru Stadium, Chișinău, Moldova	7	Moldova	1–0	1–1	UEFA Euro 2024 qualifying

== Honours ==
Havnar Bóltfelag

- Faroe Islands Premier League: 2020
- Faroe Islands Cup: 2020
- Faroe Islands Super Cup: 2021

Klaksvíkar Ítróttarfelag

- Faroe Islands Super Cup: 2022

== Personal life ==
Mikkelsen works as an electrician.
