= Andreas Olsen (footballer, born 1987) =

Faroese footballer (born 1987)

Personal information
- Full name: Andreas Lava Olsen
- Date of birth: 9 October 1987 (age 39)
- Place of birth: Leirvík, Faroe Islands
- Height: 1.89 m (6 ft 2 in)
- Positions: Winger; striker

Team information
- Current team: Víkingur
- Number: 2

Senior career*
Years	Team	Apps	(Gls)
2004–2007	LÍF Leirvík	71	(35)
2008–2011	Víkingur	61	(16)
2011–13	Boldklubben Frem	35	(15)
2014–	Víkingur Gøta	182	(56)

International career^{‡}
2003	Faroe Islands U17	7	(1)
2005	Faroe Islands U19	3	(0)
2007	Faroe Islands U 21	2	(0)
2008–	Faroe Islands	19	(2)
- * Club domestic league appearances and goals as of 10 November 2023 ‡ National team caps and goals as of 18 April 2023

Andreas Lava Olsen (born 9 October 1987) is a Faroese international footballer who plays for Víkingur Gøta. From 2011 to 2013 he played for Boldklubben Frem in the Danish 1st Division while living in Denmark because of studies. After finishing his studies he returned to the Faroe Islands.

== International goals ==
Scores and results list Faroe Islands' goal tally first.

#	Date	Venue	Opponent	Score	Result	Competition	Reference
1.	5 September 2009	UPC-Arena, Graz, Austria	Austria	1–3	1–3	2010 FIFA World Cup qualification	
2.	3 September 2020	Tórsvøllur, Tórshavn, Faroe Islands	Malta	2–2	3–2	2020–21 UEFA Nations League D	
