= Odmar Færø =

Faroese footballer (born 1989)

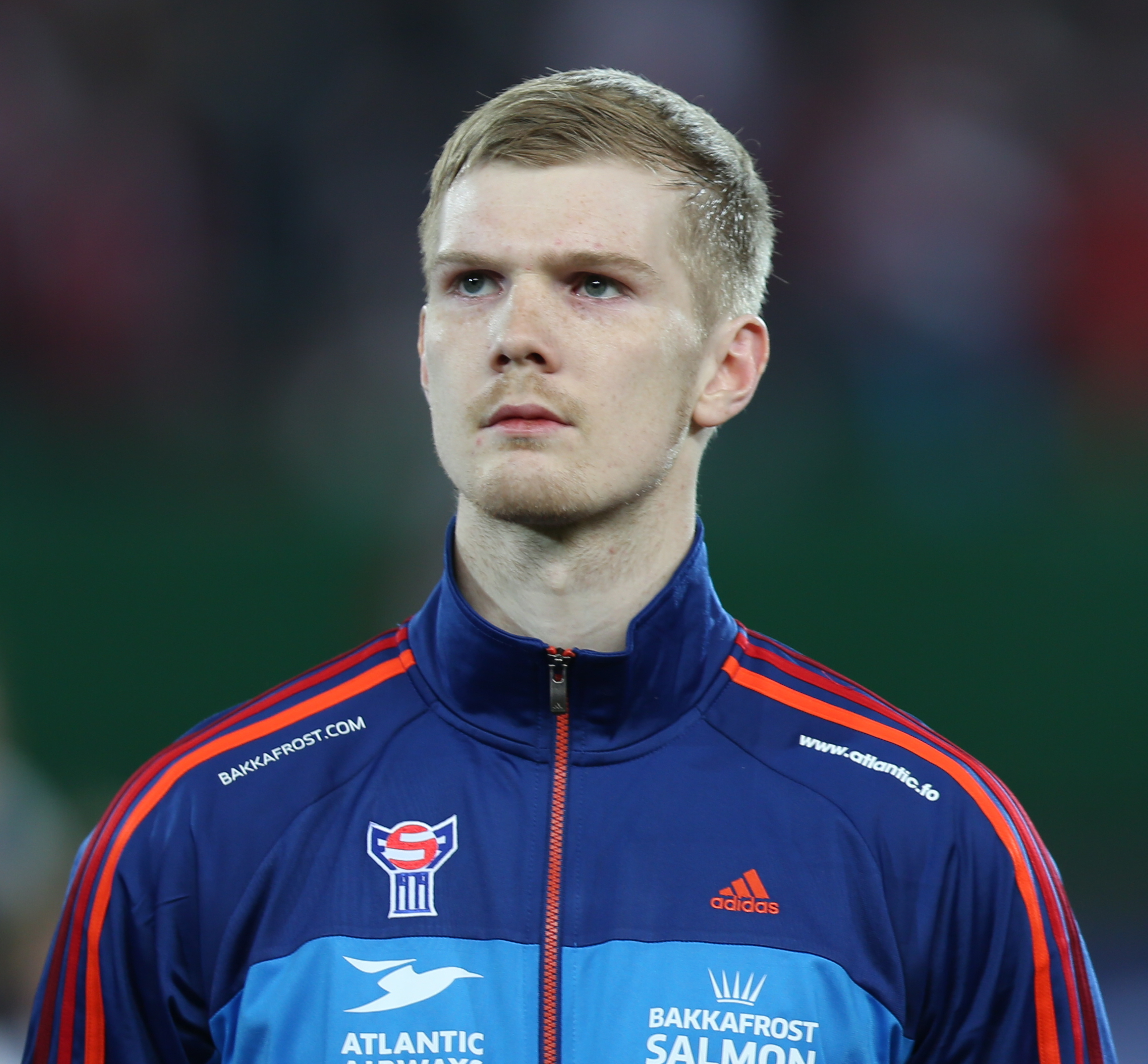
- Færø in 2013

Personal information
- Date of birth: 1 November 1989 (age 37)
- Place of birth: Tórshavn, Faroe Islands
- Height: 1.85 m (6 ft 1 in)
- Position: Centre-back

Team information
- Current team: KÍ
- Number: 22

Youth career
- –2005: Westhill Boys Club
- 2005–2006: Dyce Juniors
- 2006–2007: Keith

Senior career*
Years	Team	Apps	(Gls)
2007–2009	B36 Tórshavn	34	(1)
2009	Brøndby IF	0	(0)
2009–2012	B36 Tórshavn	64	(2)
2011–2012	→ Keith (loan)	?	(?)
2012–2014	Forfar Athletic	21	(0)
2014–2016	B36 Torshavn	40	(1)
2016	Banks O' Dee	18	(6)
2016–2019	B36 Torshavn	73	(9)
2019	HamKam	18	(0)
2020–	KÍ	147	(13)

International career^{‡}
2006–2007	Faroe Islands U19	6	(0)
2007–2010	Faroe Islands U21	7	(0)
2012–	Faroe Islands	76	(2)
- * Club domestic league appearances and goals as of 1 November 2026 ‡ National team caps and goals as of 16 November 2026

Odmar Færø (born 1 November 1989) is a Faroese footballer who plays as a centre-back for KÍ. Færø has represented the Faroe Islands national football team and previously played for Hamarkameratene, B36 Tórshavn, Keith, Brøndby IF, Forfar Athletic and Banks O' Dee.

== Career ==
Færø played his youth football in Scotland where his father, ex-Faroese international player Oddmar, worked as a dentist. He was called up to the Faroe Islands U19 squad in 2006 while still a player at Highland League side, Keith. Færø moved to the Faroe Islands at the age of 17, joining B36 Tórshavn.

Færø returned to Scotland in 2011 to attend Robert Gordon University in Aberdeen on a sports scholarship, and signed for Scottish club Forfar Athletic in August 2012. He stayed at Forfar Athletic until June 2014, making 21 appearances. Færø made his full debut for the Faroe Islands against Germany in September 2012, becoming the first Loons player to earn an international cap.

He rejoined B36 in June 2014, moving on to become National Champions in 2014 and 2015. Færø spent the early part of 2016 at Scottish Junior side Banks O' Dee and was named their player of the year before returning to B36 in June 2016. In 2018 he led his team to win the National Cup in a very dramatic final.

He has played two matches for B36 Tórshavn in the UEFA Champions League (First qualifying round) in July 2012 against Linfield. He then played two matches for B36 in the 2014–15 Europa League first qualifying round, again against Linfield. In 2018–19 UEFA Europa League he captained his team to reach 2nd qualifying round, where Beşiktaş was too strong an opponent.

On 3 September 2019, Færø agreed to signed for KÍ on a contract starting 1 January 2020.

== International goals ==
Scores and results list Faroe Islands' goal tally first.

No.	Date	Venue	Opponent	Score	Result	Competition
1.	10 October 2020	Tórsvøllur, Tórshavn, Faroe Islands	Latvia	1–1	1–1	2020–21 UEFA Nations League D
2.	20 June 2023	Tórsvøllur, Tórshavn, Faroe Islands	Albania	1–1	1–3	UEFA Euro 2024 qualifying

== Personal life ==
Færø works as a supply manager at the shipyard while also playing football.
