= Graeme Torrilla =

Gibraltarian footballer

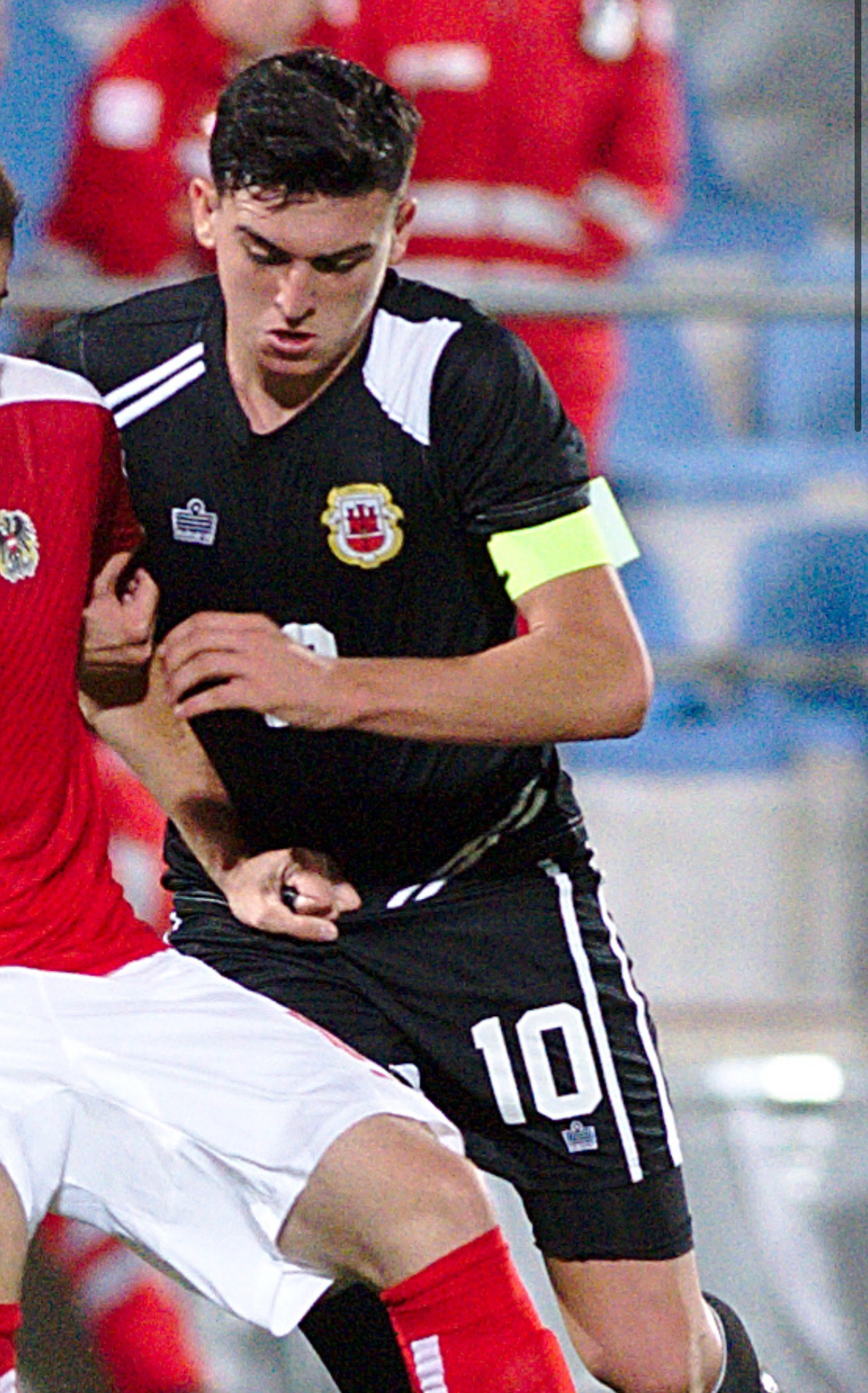

Personal information
- Full name: Graeme Lee Torrilla
- Date of birth: 3 September 1997 (age 29)
- Place of birth: Gibraltar
- Position: Midfielder

Team information
- Current team: Lincoln Red Imps
- Number: 22

Youth career
- –2014: Lincoln Red Imps

Senior career*
Years	Team	Apps	(Gls)
2014–2016	Red Imps	35	(7)
2016–2017	Lions Gibraltar	26	(0)
2017–2020	Mons Calpe	44	(2)
2020–	Lincoln Red Imps	94	(9)

International career^{‡}
2015	Gibraltar U19	3	(0)
2017–2018	Gibraltar U21	10	(1)
2020–	Gibraltar	44	(1)
- * Club domestic league appearances and goals as of 22 November 2026 ‡ National team caps and goals as of 18 November 2026

Graeme Lee Torrilla (born 3 September 1997) is a Gibraltarian footballer who plays as a midfielder for Lincoln Red Imps and the Gibraltar national team.

== Club career ==
Torrilla joined Lincoln Red Imps from Mons Calpe in January 2020.

== International career ==
Torrilla made his international debut for Gibraltar on 5 September 2020 in the UEFA Nations League against San Marino. He scored on his debut, the only goal in a 1–0 home win for Gibraltar.

== Career statistics ==
=== International ===
As of 16 November 2026

Gibraltar
Year	Apps	Goals
2020	5	1
2021	9	0
2022	10	0
2023	2	0
2024	5	0
2025	6	0
2026	7	0
Total	44	1

=== International goals ===
No.	Date	Venue	Opponent	Score	Result	Competition
1.	5 September 2020	Victoria Stadium, Gibraltar	San Marino	1–0	1–0	2020–21 UEFA Nations League D
