= Oak Ridge =

Oak Ridge or Oakridge may refer to numerous locations in English-speaking countries - including Oak Ridge, Tennessee, well known for its part in the Manhattan Project. These and other meanings include:

== Places ==
=== Canada ===
- Oakridge, Calgary, neighbourhood in Alberta
- Oakridge, Toronto, a neighbourhood in Ontario
- Oakridge, Vancouver, a neighbourhood in British Columbia
- Oakridge Acres, a neighbourhood in London, Ontario

=== United Kingdom ===
==== Gloucestershire ====
- Oakridge, Stroud, Gloucestershire, England
- Oakridge, Tewkesbury, Gloucestershire, England

==== Other ====
- Oakridge, Hampshire, England

=== United States ===
==== Communities ====
- Oak Ridge (California), in Santa Clara County
- Oak Ridge, Florida, in Orange County
- Oak Ridge, Louisiana, in Morehouse Parish
- Oak Ridge, Michigan, an unincorporated community
- Oakridge, Minnesota, in Winona County
- Oak Ridge, Missouri, in Cape Girardeau County
- Oak Ridge, Pemiscot County, Missouri
- Oak Ridge, New York, a hamlet south of the village of Charleston, New York
- Oak Ridge, New Jersey, in Passaic and Morris Counties
- Oak Ridge, North Carolina, a town in Guilford County
- Oak Ridge, Stokes County, North Carolina
- Oakridge, Oregon, in Lane County
- Oak Ridge, Pennsylvania (disambiguation)
- Oak Ridge, Tennessee, in Anderson and Roane counties
- Oakridge, Montgomery County, Tennessee, in Montgomery County
- Oak Ridge, Cooke County, Texas
- Oak Ridge, Kaufman County, Texas
- Oak Ridge North, Texas, in Montgomery County
- Oak Ridge, Virginia (disambiguation)
- Oak Ridge, West Virginia, in Fayette County
- Oakridge, Wisconsin, in the town of Isabelle, Pierce County

==== Other places ====
- Oak Ridge (California), a ridge in Santa Clara County
- Oakridge station, a light rail station in San Jose, California
- Oak Ridge, Adams County, Pennsylvania, part of the Gettysburg Battlefield
- Oak Ridge Historic District, a historic district in Oak Ridge, Tennessee
- Oak Ridge (Danville, Virginia), a historic plantation estate in Pittsylvania County
- Oakridge (Blackstone, Virginia), an historic home in Nottoway County

== Cemeteries ==
- Oak Ridge Cemetery in Springfield, Illinois, U.S.
- Oakridge Cemetery, a cemetery located in Hillside, Illinois, U.S.

== Education ==
- Oak Ridge Associated Universities, a consortium of American universities headquartered in Oak Ridge, Tennessee, U.S.
- Oak Ridge High School (disambiguation)
- Oak Ridge Institute for Science and Education, a Department of Energy institute, headquartered in Oak Ridge, Tennessee, U.S.
- Oak Ridge Military Academy, a military college-preparatory school in North Carolina, U.S.
- Oakridge School (disambiguation)
- Oakridge Secondary School, a secondary school in London, Ontario, Canada

== Science ==
- K-25, a former uranium enrichment facility of the Manhattan Project in Oak Ridge, Tennessee, U.S.
- Oak Ridge National Laboratory, a science and technology national laboratory in Oak Ridge, Tennessee, U.S.
  - ORACLE (computer), an early computer built at the laboratory
- Oak Ridge Observatory, an astronomical observatory at Harvard University

== Other uses ==
- USS Oak Ridge (ARDM-1), a World War II U.S. naval vessel used as a floating dry dock
- The Oak Ridge Boys, a U.S. country music band
- Oak Ridge Waste, a waste management company located in the United States.
