= Isabel Creek =

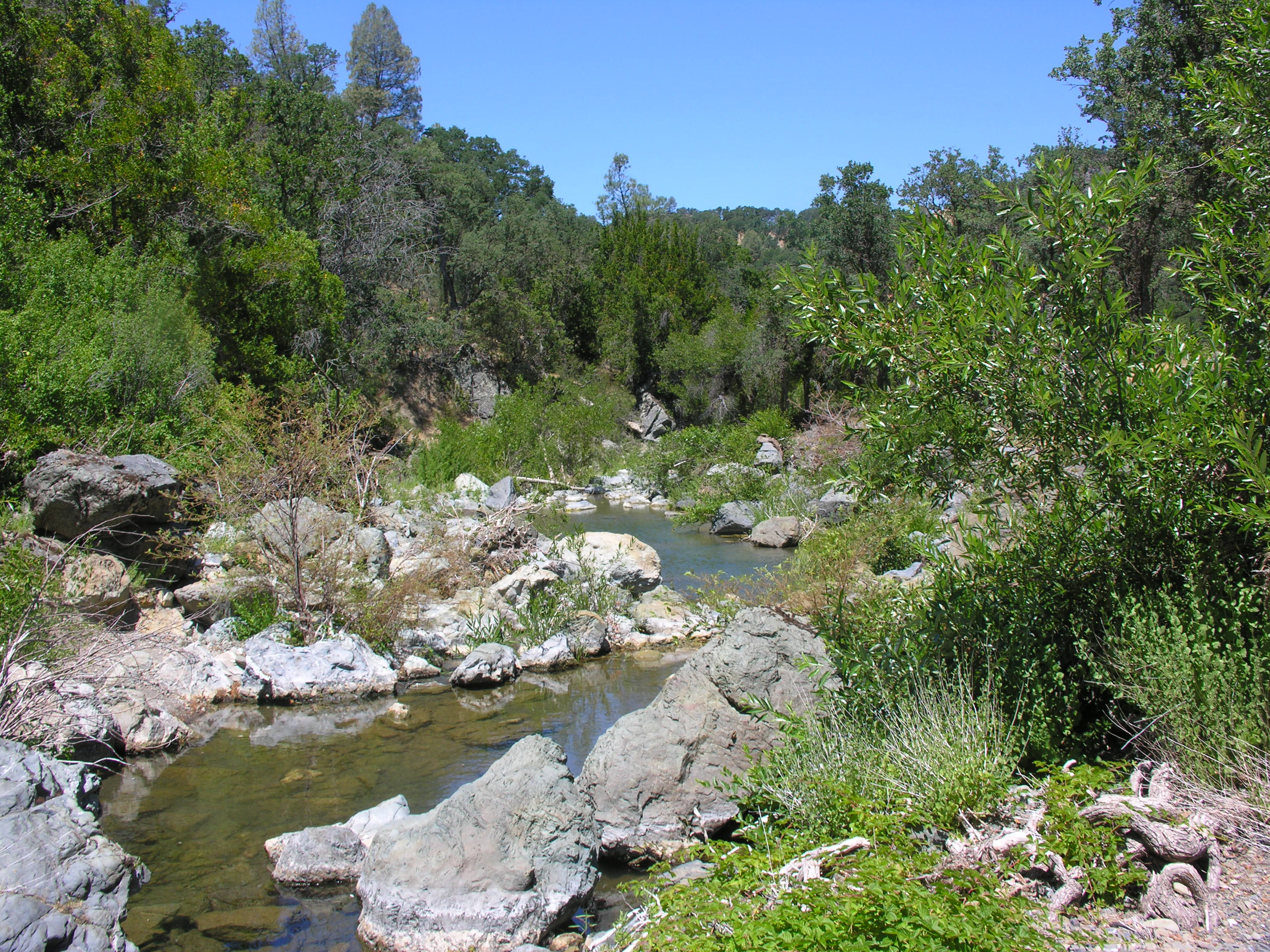
- Isabel Creek in July 2011

Location
- Country: United States
- State: California
- Region: Santa Clara County

Physical characteristics
- Source: Southwestern flank of Jays Ridge in the Diablo Range
  - coordinates: 37°15′40″N 121°31′39″W
  - elevation: 2,637 ft (804 m)
- Mouth: Confluence with Smith Creek to form source of Arroyo Hondo
  - coordinates: 37°23′00″N 121°41′34″W
  - elevation: 1,585 ft (483 m)

Basin features
- Tributaries
  - left: Hog Slough
  - right: Bonita Creek

Isabel Creek is a 18-mile-long (29 km) perennial stream which flows northwesterly along the eastern then northern flank of Mount Hamilton in Santa Clara County. It joins Smith Creek to form Arroyo Hondo north of Mt. Hamilton and is part of the southernmost Alameda Creek watershed.

== History ==
The Spanish name for Mt. Hamilton was the "Sierra de Santa Isabel" and the highest point was originally known as Mount Isabel instead of Mount Hamilton. William Henry Brewer and his fellow geologist, Charles F. Hoffmann, did not know it already had a name, and named it Mt. Hamilton when they climbed it on August 26, 1861, although they did place Isabel Valley on their map to the east of the mountain. When in 1895, the USGS realized that the peak two miles southeast of Mt. Hamilton was 14 feet taller at (4,193 ft or 1,278 m), they named it Mt. Isabel.

== Watershed and course ==
Isabel Creek arises at 2,637 feet (804 m) then flows north through Isabel Valley, where it is impounded in Isabel Reservoir since the 1940s. The creek leaves Isabel Valley and continues northwest, crossing Mount Hamilton Road then along the eastern and northern flanks of Mount Hamilton, joining Smith Creek about 15.3 km WNW of Mount Hamilton at 37°23′00″N 121°41′34″W to form Arroyo Hondo which, in turn, joins Calaveras Creek in Calaveras Reservoir. Calaveras Creek exits the reservoir and joins Alameda Creek before final terminating in San Francisco Bay.

== Habitat and Ecology ==
Steelhead trout (Oncorhynchus mykiss) are native to Isabel Creek, as noted by John Otterbein Snyder who collected specimens in 1898. The construction of Calaveras Dam blocks in-migrating fish from San Francisco Bay.

Impassable falls are present on upper Arroyo Hondo, but the rainbow trout in Smith and Isabel creeks are assumed to be native, as California roach (Hesperoleucus symmetricus) and Sacramento sucker (Catostomus occidentalis occidentalis) are also present above and below the falls. Speckled dace (Rhinichthys osculus) were collected by John Otterbein Snyder in 1898 in Arroyo Hondo and Isabel creeks, but not by Scoppettone and Smith in 1978, nor by Leidy and Bronwen in 2013, and their status in the creek remains uncertain as is true of most of their former sites in the central coast.

Foothill yellow-legged frogs (Rana boylei) and California red-legged frogs (Rana draytoni) are present in Upper Alameda, Arroyo Hondo, Smith, and Isabel creeks.

== See also ==
- Mount Hamilton (California)
- List of watercourses in the San Francisco Bay Area
- Rainbow trout
