= Smith Creek (Arroyo Hondo tributary) =

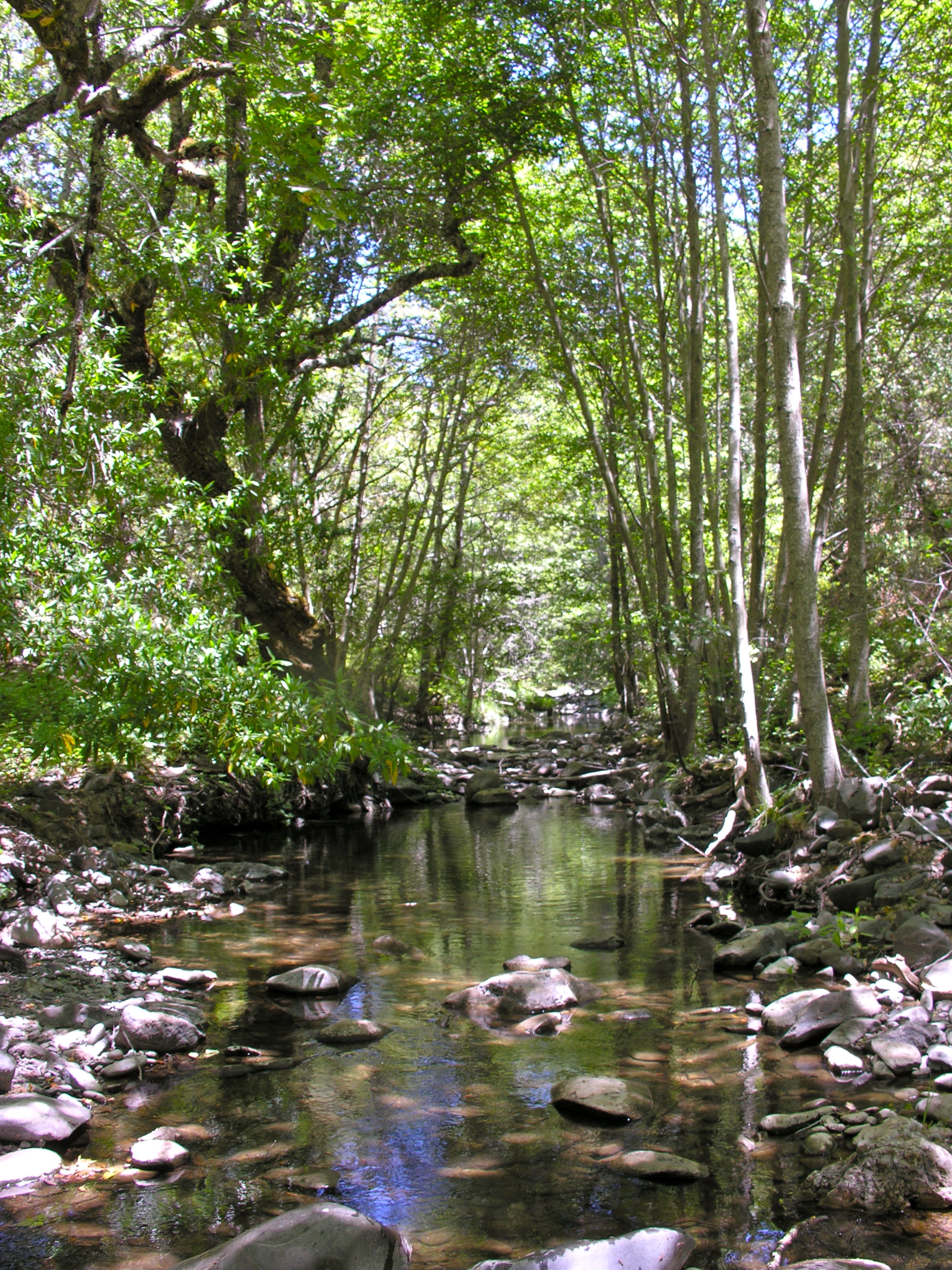
- View upstream of Smith Creek at Mt. Hamilton Road crossing with California bay laurel and white alder, courtesy of Robert A. Leidy PhD, U.S. EPA

Location
- Country: United States
- State: California
- Region: Santa Clara County

Physical characteristics
- Source: Northwestern slope of Bollinger Ridge in the Diablo Range
  - coordinates: 37°16′39″N 121°33′41″W
  - elevation: 3,520 ft (1,070 m)
- Mouth: Confluence with Isabel Creek to form source of Arroyo Hondo
  - coordinates: 37°23′00″N 121°41′34″W
  - elevation: 1,585 ft (483 m)

Basin features
- Tributaries
  - right: Castle Canyon, Sulphur Creek

Smith Creek is a 14-mile-long (23 km) perennial stream which flows along the western flank of Mount Hamilton in Santa Clara County. The creek begins near Bollinger Ridge, about 7.7 km south-southwest of Mount Hamilton.

== History ==
Some of the early recorded history of the Smith Creek watershed is associated with the pioneer family of the Winsors.

Where Mt. Hamilton Road crosses Smith Creek, there used to be the Hotel Santa Ysabel.

== Watershed and course ==
Smith Creek arises at 3,520 feet (1,070 m) then flows westerly through Horse Valley, then turns northwest. It receives Sulphur Creek 0.8 miles (1.3 km) before crossing Mount Hamilton Road about 12.7 km west of Mount Hamilton (the Smith Creek Ranger Station/CAL FIRE is located at this crossing at 22805 Mt. Hamilton Road). The creek continues northwest along the eastern boundary of Joseph D. Grant County Park and joins Isabel Creek about 15.3 km WNW of Mount Hamilton at 37°23′00″N 121°41′34″W, forming Arroyo Hondo and eventually joining Calaveras Creek in Calaveras Reservoir. Calaveras Creek exits the reservoir and joins Alameda Creek before final terminating in San Francisco Bay.

== Habitat and Ecology ==
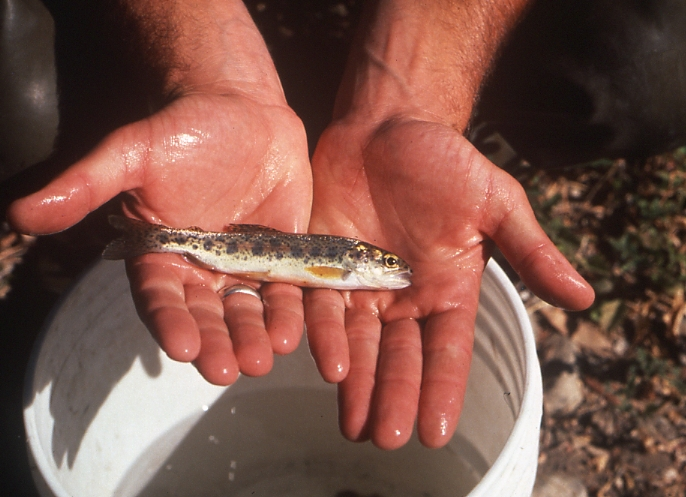
Juvenile rainbow trout briefly electrofished and measured on Smith Creek by Robert A. Leidy PhD, U.S. EPA

Steelhead trout (Oncorhynchus mykiss) are native to Smith Creek, although the construction of Calaveras Dam blocks in-migrating fish. Both Smith Creek and Arroyo Hondo were recorded in 1905 by John Otterbein Snyder as holding anadromous Steelhead trout (Oncorhynchus mykiss) streams.

Impassable falls are present on upper Arroyo Hondo, but the rainbow trout in Smith and Isabel creeks are assumed to be native, as California roach (Hesperoleucus symmetricus) and Sacramento sucker (Catostomus occidentalis occidentalis) are also present above and below the falls. Speckled dace (Rhinichthys osculus) were collected by John Otterbein Snyder in 1905 in Arroyo Hondo and Isabel creeks, but not by Scoppettone and Smith in 1978, having disappeared from most of their former sites in the central coast.

The invasive, non-native signal crayfish lives along the length of Smith Creek. Foothill yellow-legged frogs (Rana boylei) and California red-legged frogs (Rana draytoni) are present in Upper Alameda, Arroyo Hondo, Smith, and Isabel creeks.

River otter (Lontra canadensis) are among the rare species observed at the University of California, Berkeley Blue Oak Ranch Reserve (in June 1999), on the Smith Creek tributary of Arroyo Hondo.

Purchase of the Nolan Ranch included 5 miles of Sulphur Creek and Smith Creek, from San Jose Sharks hockey player Owen Nolan, adding 1,157 acres to the Joseph D. Grant County Park in 2012.

== See also ==
- Mount Hamilton (California)
- List of watercourses in the San Francisco Bay Area
- Rainbow trout
