= Oakridge School =

Oakridge School may refer to:

- The Oakridge School, Arlington, Texas, United States
- Oakridge High School (Oregon), Oakridge, Oregon, United States
- Oakridge International School, Hyderabad, Andhra Pradesh, India
- Oakridge Secondary School, London, Ontario, Canada

== See also ==
- Oak Ridge High School (disambiguation)
- Oakridge Public Schools - a public school district in Egelston Township, Michigan, United States
