= Arroyo Hondo (Santa Clara County) =

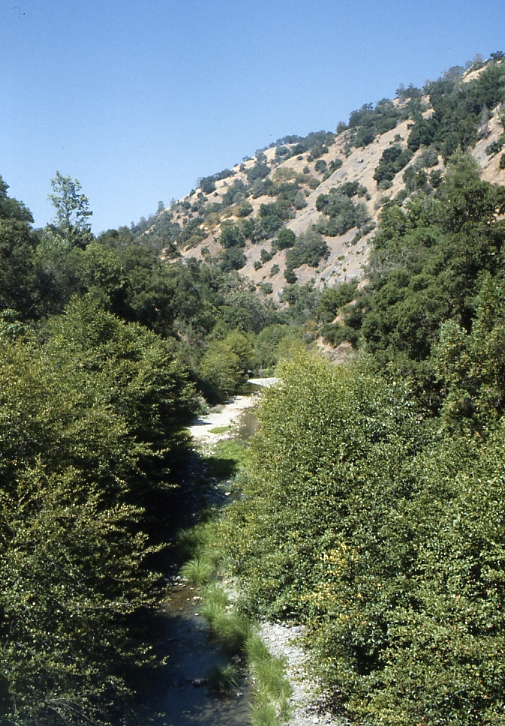
- Summer low flows in Arroyo Hondo with riparian white alder and foothill pine

Location
- Country: United States
- State: California
- Region: Santa Clara County

Physical characteristics
- Source: Confluence of Smith Creek and Isabel Creek
  - coordinates: 37°23′00″N 121°41′34″W
  - elevation: 1,585 ft (483 m)
- Mouth: Joins Calaveras Creek in Calaveras Reservoir
  - coordinates: 37°27′51″N 121°46′36″W
  - elevation: 771 ft (235 m)

Arroyo Hondo is a northwestward-flowing 13-mile-long (20.9 km) river in Santa Clara County, California, United States, that lies east of Milpitas. The area is privately owned by the San Francisco Water Department and is closed to public access because of its usage as drinking water. Bounded to the east by Oak Ridge and to the west by Poverty Ridge, Arroyo Hondo empties into the Calaveras Reservoir where it joins Calaveras Creek. It is formed by the confluence of Smith Creek and Isabel Creek which drain the west and east slopes of Mount Hamilton, respectively.

== History ==
Arroyo Hondo means "deep creek" in Spanish. Its Isabel Creek tributary is significant in that the Spanish name for Mt. Hamilton was the Sierra de Santa Isabel, and the highest point was then referred to as Mount Isabel instead of Mount Hamilton. When William Henry Brewer and Charles Hoffman of the Whitney Survey climbed the peak on August 26, 1861, they did not know it had a name, and christened it Mt. Hamilton, although they did correctly place Isabel Valley on their map to the east. When in 1895, the USGS realized that the peak two miles (3.2 km) southeast of Mt. Hamilton was as tall (4,193 feet; 1,278 m), they correctly named it Mt. Isabel.

== Watershed ==
The Arroyo Hondo mainstem is formed by the confluence of Isabel Creek and Smith Creek at the northern tip of Joseph D. Grant County Park at an elevation of 1,585 feet (483 m) above sea level. It flows northerly to its confluence with Calaveras Reservoir at an elevation of 765 feet (233 m). Isabel Creek begins at about 2,600 feet (790 m), about one mile (1.6 km) south of Mt. Helen, then flows north through the Isabel Valley, then east and north of Mt. Isabel and Mt. Hamilton until it is joined by Smith Creek. Arroyo Hondo joins Calaveras Creek in Calaveras Reservoir. Calaveras Creek is, in turn, tributary to Alameda Creek in Alameda County and ultimately flows into San Francisco Bay.

== Ecology ==
Arroyo Hondo still has remnants of native coastal rainbow trout (Oncorhynchus mykiss irideus), which several conservation organizations have attempted to protect. Impassable falls are now present on upper Arroyo Hondo, but the rainbow trout in its Smith and Isabel creek tributaries are assumed to be native, as California roach (Hesperoleucus symmetricus) and Sacramento sucker (Catostomus occidentalis occidentalis) are also present above and below the falls. The California Academy of Sciences collected a steelhead trout specimen in 1898 on Isabel Creek. Also, both Smith Creek and Arroyo Hondo were recorded in 1905 by John Otterbein Snyder as anadromous steelhead trout (Oncorhynchus mykiss irideus) streams. Speckled dace (Rhinichthys osculus) were collected by John Otterbein Snyder in 1898 in Arroyo Hondo and Isabel creeks, but not by Scoppettone and Smith in 1978, or by Leidy and Bronwen in 2013, and their status in the creek remains uncertain as is true of most of their former sites in the central coast.

Foothill yellow-legged frogs (Rana boylei) and California red-legged frogs (Rana draytoni) are present in Upper Alameda, Arroyo Hondo, Smith, and Isabel creeks.

== See also ==
- List of watercourses in the San Francisco Bay Area
