= Black Mountain (Milpitas, California) =

Mountain in the American state of California

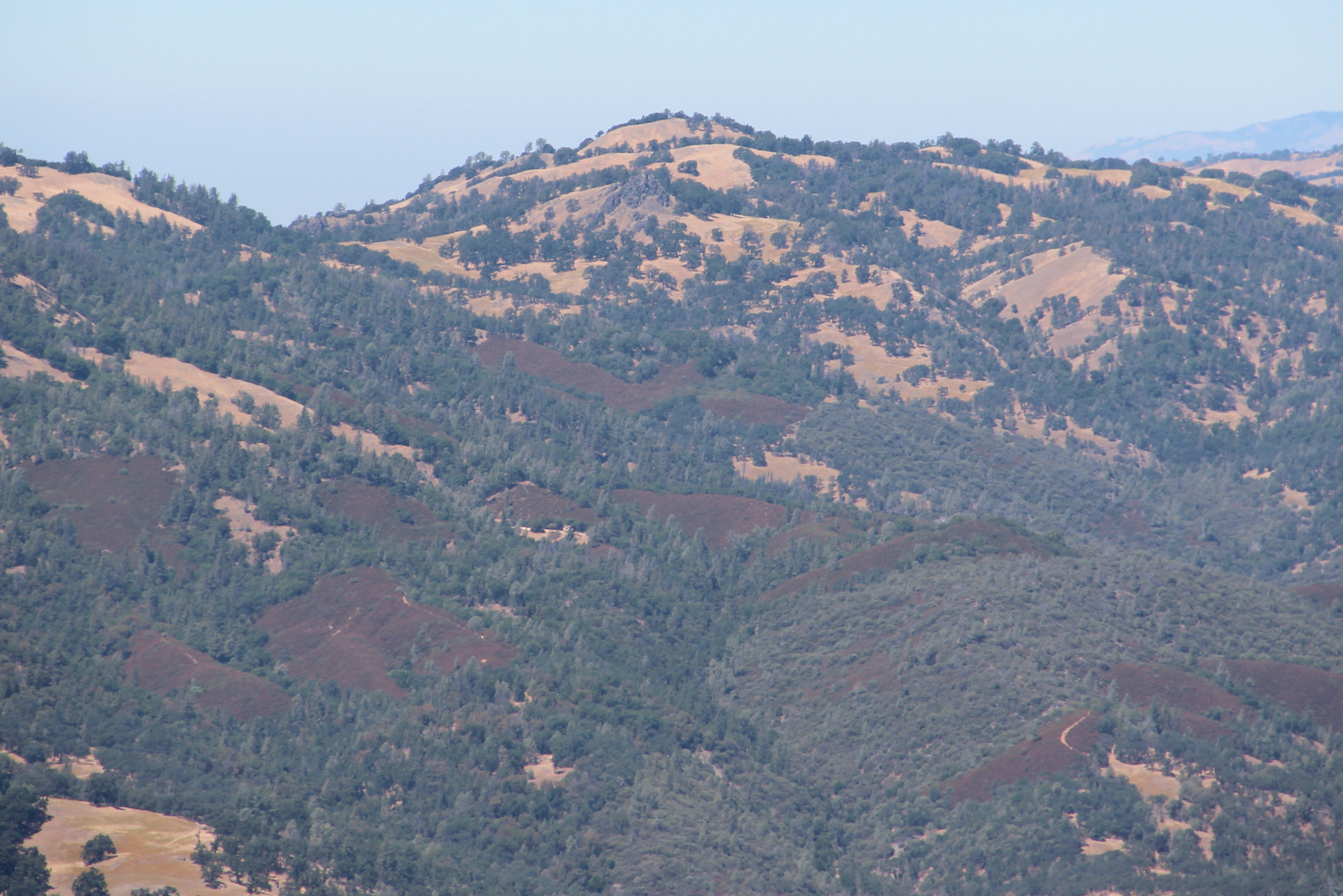
- Black Mountain viewed from Mount Hamilton

Highest point
- Elevation: 3,955 ft (1,205 m) NAVD 88
- Coordinates: 37°26′14″N 121°42′03″W

Geography
- Location: Santa Clara County, California, U.S.
- Parent range: Diablo Range
- Topo map: USGS Mount Day

Black Mountain, also known as Mount Day, is a mountain in the Diablo Range of eastern Santa Clara County, California, east of Poverty Ridge and Arroyo Hondo, and about 10 miles (16 km) from Milpitas.

The peak is one of the highest in area. The northern half of Black Mountain is an oak woodlands while the southern half is barren. Black Mountain can be clearly seen from most parts of the Santa Clara Valley including Sunnyvale, Cupertino, Mountain View and San Jose. The peak is visible from the Mount Hamilton and Monument Peak.

== See also ==
- List of summits of the San Francisco Bay Area
