= Oak Ridges =

Oak Ridges may refer to:

== Places ==
- Oak Ridges (electoral district), a defunct federal electoral district in Ontario
- Oak Ridges (provincial electoral district), a defunct provincial electoral district in Ontario
- Oak Ridges, Ontario, a community within the boundaries of Richmond Hill, Ontario, Canada
- Oak Ridges Moraine
- Oak Ridges—Markham, an electoral district in Ontario

== Other uses ==
- Oak Ridges Moraine Conservation Act (officially known as the Oak Ridges Moraine Conservation Act, 2001), a conservation plan for land situated on or near the Oak Ridges Moraine in Ontario
- Oak Ridges Moraine Land Trust

== See also ==
- Oak Ridge (disambiguation)
