= Oak Ridge (California) =

Hill in California, United States

Coordinates: 37°27.6′N 121°43.3′W

Oak Ridge in Santa Clara County, California, is a ridge forming the east canyon wall of Arroyo Hondo, which drains into Calaveras Reservoir. Black Mountain is its highest point.

== History ==
The first known white settlers on Oak Ridge were the Parks family, who ran cattle on the ridge.

== Currently private property ==
Now owned by the San Francisco Water Department, the ridge is private property and is off-limits to most people.

== See also ==
- Arroyo Hondo
- Milpitas, California
