= ORHS =

ORHS may refer to:

- Oak Ridge High School (disambiguation)
- Otay Ranch High School, Chula Vista, California, United States
- Oxford Regional High School, Oxford, Nova Scotia, Canada
- Oyster River High School, Durham, New Hampshire, United States
