= Calaveras Creek (California) =

- Location of the mouth in California
- Etymology: Spanish

Location
- Country: United States
- State: California
- Region: Alameda County, Santa Clara County

Physical characteristics
- Source
  - location: 8 miles (13 km) east of Milpitas
  - coordinates: 37°25′53″N 121°44′49″W
- Mouth: Alameda Creek
  - location: 6 miles (9.7 km) east of Fremont
  - coordinates: 37°30′13″N 121°49′17″W
  - elevation: 427 ft (130 m)
- Length: 8.5 mi (13.7 km)

Basin features
- Tributaries
  - right: Arroyo Hondo

Calaveras Creek is a northward-flowing stream in Alameda and Santa Clara counties of California. It runs for 8.5 miles (13.7 km), starting from Poverty Ridge, passing through Calaveras Reservoir, and emptying into Alameda Creek east of Fremont, California.

Its main tributary is Arroyo Hondo.

== Ecology ==
Calaveras Dam, built by the Spring Valley Water Company in 1925, was re-built in 2018. Facing legal challenges to release flows to support steelhead trout (Oncorhynchus mykiss) in the 20 miles (32 km) of Calaveras Creek below the dam, the San Francisco Public Utilities Commission (SFPUC) began steady releases that lowered the water temperatures and resulted in a sharp increase in the numbers of trout.

== See also ==
- List of watercourses in the San Francisco Bay Area
