= Chris Babb =

American basketball player (born 1990)

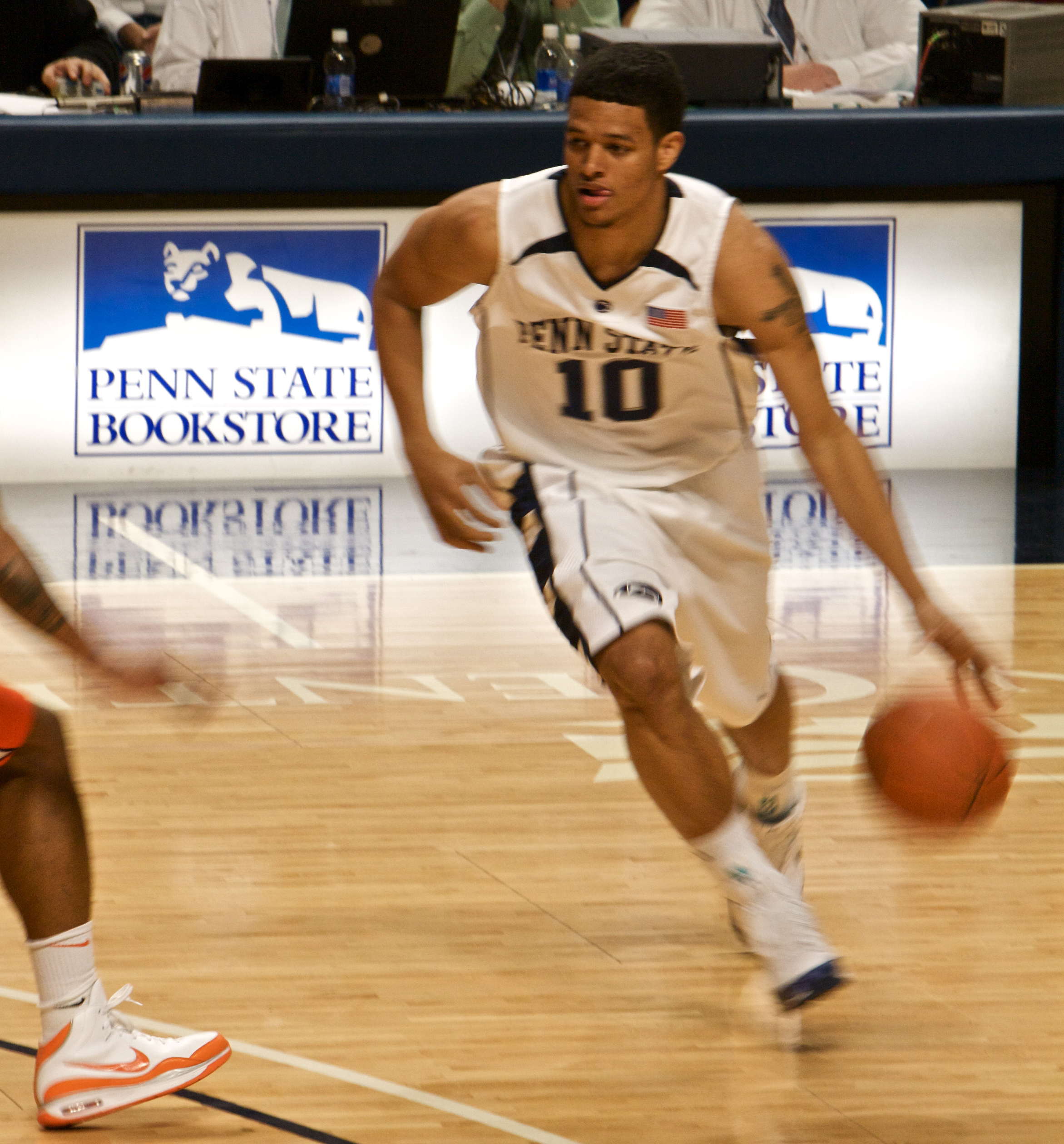
- Babb with Penn State in 2009

Personal information
- Born: February 14, 1990 (age 36) Topeka, Kansas, U.S.
- Listed height: 6 ft 5 in (1.96 m)
- Listed weight: 225 lb (102 kg)

Career information
- High school: The Oakridge School (Arlington, Texas)
- College: Penn State (2008–2010); Iowa State (2011–2013)
- NBA draft: 2013: undrafted
- Playing career: 2013–2026
- Position: Shooting guard
- Number: 14, 52, 19, 2, 7

Career history
- 2013–2014: Maine Red Claws
- 2014: Boston Celtics
- 2014–2015: Maine Red Claws
- 2015–2017: ratiopharm Ulm
- 2017–2018: Lokomotiv Kuban
- 2018–2019: Bahçeşehir
- 2019–2020: Promitheas Patras
- 2020–2021: Telekom Baskets Bonn
- 2021–2023: Bnei Herzliya
- 2023–2026: BCM Gravelines-Dunkerque

Career highlights
- All-Bundesliga First Team (2017); All-NBA D-League Second Team (2015); NBA D-League All-Star (2015); NBA D-League All-Rookie Third Team (2014); 2× NBA D-League All-Defensive Third Team (2014, 2015); Big 12 All-Defensive Team (2013); NIT champion (2009)
- Stats at NBA.com
- Stats at Basketball Reference

Chris Babb (born February 14, 1990) is an American former professional basketball player. He played college basketball for Pennsylvania State University and Iowa State University.

== Early life ==
Babb was born and raised in Kansas. After seventh grade, his family moved to Arlington, Texas, where his father eventually got into the barbeque business, opening up Babb Brothers BBQ & Blues in nearby Dallas. It was here that he attended The Oakridge School where he averaged 31.2 points while helping his school to a 26–3 record and a district championship as a senior. He also averaged 8.1 rebounds, 7.2 assists and totaled a school-record 1,125 points.

== College career ==
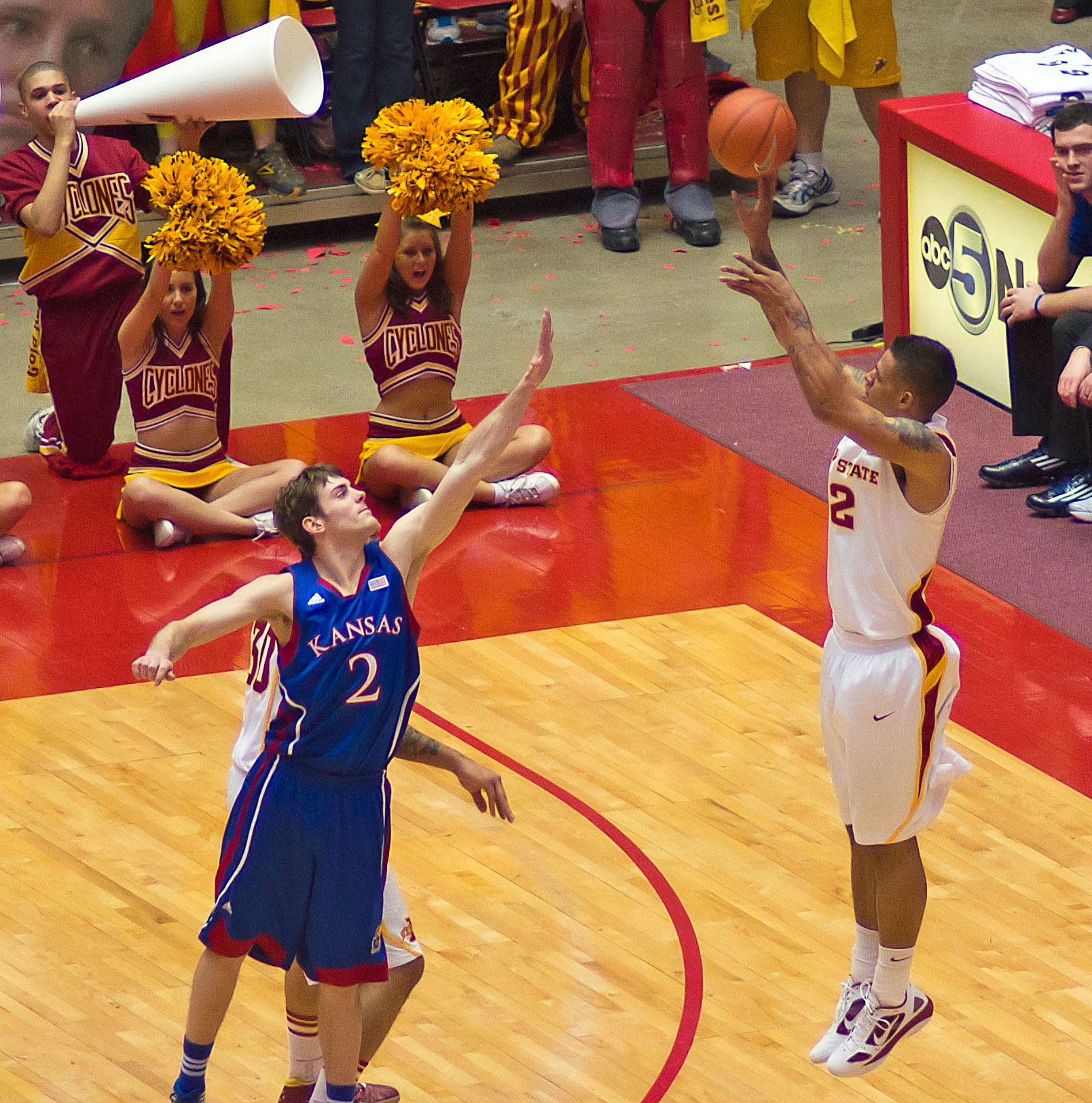
Chris Babb shooting a 3-pointer against the Kansas Jayhawks

In his freshman season at Penn State, Babb played sparingly for the Lions. In 32 games, he averaged 2.8 points and 1.1 rebounds in 10 minutes per game.

In his sophomore season, he was third on the team in assists (69) and steals (22), and made the second-most 3-pointers on the team, hitting 69-of-185 (37.3 percent) from beyond the arc. In 31 games (23 starts), he averaged 9.3 points, 3.2 rebounds and 2.2 assists in 29.7 minutes per game.

In 2011, he transferred to Iowa State University. After redshirting the 2011–12 season due to NCAA transfer rules, he had a good junior season for the Cyclones, as he went on to be ranked 10th in the Big 12 in 3-pointers per game at 1.9. In 34 games (all starts), he averaged 7.8 points, 4.1 rebounds, 1.6 assists and 1.0 steals in 33.1 minutes per game.

In November 2012, Babb was suspended for the first two games of the 2012–13 season for violating team rules. He went on to be named to the 2013 Big 12 All-Defensive Team. In 33 games (all starts), he averaged 9.1 points, 3.4 rebounds, 2.2 assists and 1.1 steals in 32.7 minutes per game. He made 38.2 percent of his 3-pointers, which accounted for 5.2 of his 7.2 field goal attempts per game that season.

=== College statistics ===
Year	Team	GP	GS	MPG	FG%	3P%	FT%	RPG	APG	SPG	BPG	PPG
2008–09	Penn State	32	0	10.1	.337	.349	.619	1.1	.5	.3	.1	2.8
2009–10	Penn State	31	23	29.7	.372	.373	.816	3.2	2.2	.7	.3	9.3
2011–12	Iowa State	34	34	33.1	.362	.328	.667	4.1	1.6	1.0	.1	7.8
2012–13	Iowa State	33	33	32.7	.409	.382	.745	3.4	2.2	1.1	.2	9.1
Career		130	90	26.5	.377	.359	.733	3.0	1.7	.8	.2	7.2

== Professional career ==
=== 2013–14 season ===
After going undrafted in the 2013 NBA draft, Babb joined the Phoenix Suns for the 2013 NBA Summer League. On September 30, 2013, he signed with the Boston Celtics. However, he was later waived by the Celtics on October 26, 2013. On October 31, 2013, he was acquired by the Maine Red Claws of the NBA Development League as an affiliate player of the Celtics.

On February 28, 2014, Babb signed a 10-day contract with the Boston Celtics. On March 11, 2014, he signed a second 10-day contract with the Celtics. On March 21, 2014, he signed a multi-year, non-guaranteed deal with the Celtics.

=== 2014–15 season ===
In July 2014, Babb joined the Boston Celtics for the 2014 NBA Summer League. On September 25, 2014, he was waived by the Celtics. On October 31, 2014, he was reacquired by the Maine Red Claws. On February 4, 2015, he was named to the Futures All-Star team for the 2015 NBA D-League All-Star Game. On March 5, 2015, he scored a career-high 33 points in the Red Claws' 121–110 win over the Austin Spurs.

On April 6, 2015, Babb signed a multi-year deal with the Boston Celtics, but was immediately assigned back down to the Red Claws. Six days later, he was recalled by the Celtics after the Red Claws were eliminated from the D-League playoffs. He did not appear in a game for the Celtics in his second stint with the team.

=== 2015–16 season ===
On July 27, 2015, Babb was traded, along with Gerald Wallace, to the Golden State Warriors in exchange for David Lee. On October 23, 2015, he was waived by the Warriors after appearing in five preseason games.

On November 19, 2015, Babb signed with ratiopharm Ulm of the German Basketball Bundesliga. In 32 league games for Ulm in 2015–16, he averaged 10.3 points, 4.0 rebounds and 3.2 assists per game. He also averaged 10.1 points, 2.5 rebounds, 1.7 assists and 1.4 steals in 10 Eurocup games.

=== 2016–17 season ===
On June 14, 2016, Babb re-signed with ratiopharm Ulm for the 2016–17 season. He finished the regular season setting a new record for the German BBL: 100 successful 3-pointers made (out of 233 3-point attempts, representing a 42.9% 3-point rate over the entire regular season).

=== 2017–18 season ===
On July 5, 2017, Babb signed a two-year deal with Russian club Lokomotiv Kuban. They parted ways in July 2018.

=== 2018–19 season ===
On July 15, 2018, Babb signed a deal with Bahçeşehir of the Basketbol Süper Ligi.

=== 2019–20 season ===
On July 16, 2019, Babb moved to Greece for Promitheas of the Greek Basket League and the EuroCup. He averaged 9.8 points per game.

=== 2020–21 season ===
On August 9, 2020, Babb signed with Telekom Baskets Bonn of the Basketball Bundesliga. He averaged 17 points, 3.1 assists, and 2.1 rebounds per game.

=== 2021–22 season ===
On October 4, 2021, Babb signed with Bnei Herzliya of the Israeli Basketball Premier League.

=== 2023–24 season ===
On November 12, 2023, he signed with BCM Gravelines-Dunkerque of the French LNB Pro A.

=== 2024–25 season ===
On July 8, 2024, Babb re-signed with BCM Gravelines-Dunkerque.

== NBA career statistics ==
Legend
GP	Games played	GS	Games started	MPG	Minutes per game
FG%	Field goal percentage	3P%	3-point field goal percentage	FT%	Free throw percentage
RPG	Rebounds per game	APG	Assists per game	SPG	Steals per game
BPG	Blocks per game	PPG	Points per game	**Bold**	Career high

=== Regular season ===
Year	Team	GP	GS	MPG	FG%	3P%	FT%	RPG	APG	SPG	BPG	PPG
2013–14	Boston	14	0	9.4	.267	.222	.000	1.2	.2	.4	.0	1.6
Career		14	0	9.4	.267	.222	.000	1.2	.2	.4	.0	1.6

== Personal life ==
Babb is the son of Mike and Nikki Babb, and has a younger brother named Nick, who played basketball for Iowa State University and professionally in Germany. His cousin, John Babb, played college football at Baker University.
