= Oak Ridge High School =

Oak Ridge High School, Oakridge High School, or Oakridge School may refer to a school:

== Canada ==
- Oakridge High School (London, Ontario)

== United States ==
- Oak Ridge High School (Oak Ridge, Tennessee), Oak Ridge, Tennessee
- Oak Ridge High School (El Dorado Hills, California), El Dorado Hills, California
- Oak Ridge High School (Oak Ridge, Louisiana), in Morehouse Parish
- Oak Ridge High School (Missouri), Oak Ridge, Missouri
- Oak Ridge Central Campus in Randolph County, Arkansas
- Oak Ridge High School (Montgomery County, Texas), Conroe, Texas
- Oak Ridge High School (Orlando, Florida), Orlando, Florida
- Oakridge High School (Muskegon, Michigan), Muskegon, Michigan
- Oakridge High School (Oregon), Oakridge, Oregon
- The Oakridge School, Arlington, Texas

== See also ==
- Oak Ridge (disambiguation)
