= Tayo Fabuluje =

Nigerian American football player (born 1991)

No. 73
- Position: Offensive tackle

Personal information
- Born: July 17, 1991 (age 35); Lagos, Nigeria
- Listed height: 6 ft 7 in (2.01 m)
- Listed weight: 353 lb (160 kg)

Career information
- High school: Arlington (TX) Oakridge
- College: Texas Christian
- NFL draft: 2015: 6th round, 183rd overall pick

Career history
- Chicago Bears (2015); Baltimore Brigade (2017); San Antonio Commanders (2019)*; Memphis Express (2019); Houston Roughnecks (2020)*
- * Offseason or practice squad member only

Career NFL statistics
- Games played: 4
- Stats at Pro Football Reference

Olutayo Fabuluje (born July 17, 1991) is a former American football tackle. He played college football for TCU. Fabuluje was selected by the Chicago Bears in the sixth round of the 2015 NFL draft.

== College career ==
In 2010, Fabuluje redshirted at BYU. He then transferred to TCU, after which he sat out the 2011 season due to transfer rules. During the 2012 season, Fabuluje played all thirteen games, starting in twelve of them. During the 2013 season, he did not play football. He transferred back to BYU, but had no contact with the football team. During the 2014 season, Fabuluje was an honorable mention All-Big 12 Conference player. He started twelve games at left tackle.

== Professional career ==
Pre-draft measurables
Height	Weight	Arm length	Hand span	40-yard dash	20-yard shuttle	Vertical jump	Broad jump	Bench press
6 ft 6 in (1.98 m)	353 lb (160 kg)	34 in (0.86 m)	9 7/8 in (0.25 m)	5.55 s	4.77 s	29.5 in (0.75 m)	8 ft 2 in (2.49 m)	16 reps

=== Chicago Bears ===
The Chicago Bears selected Fabuluje with the seventh pick of the sixth round in the 2015 NFL draft, making him the 183rd pick overall. In his rookie season, Fabuluje violated the NFL's performance-enhancing drug policy and was suspended for four games.

=== Baltimore Brigade ===
On June 21, 2017, Fabuluje was assigned to the Baltimore Brigade of the Arena Football League.

=== San Antonio Commanders ===
On October 12, 2018, Fabuluje was signed by the San Antonio Commanders of the Alliance of American Football (AAF). He was released following the team's initial mini-camp in December 2018.

=== Memphis Express ===
In January 2019, Fabuluje signed with the Memphis Express of the AAF. However, he did not make the final roster. He was placed on injured reserve after clearing waivers. The league ceased operations in April 2019.

=== Houston Roughnecks ===
Fabuluje was selected by the Houston Roughnecks of the XFL in the 2020 XFL draft. He was waived on January 13, 2020.
