= Laurentine Hamilton =

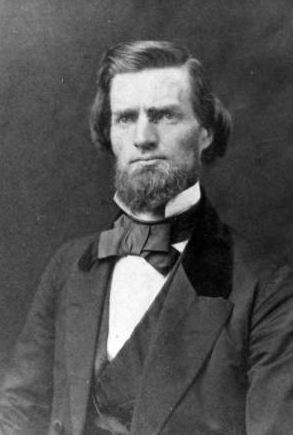
Laurentine Hamilton

Laurentine Hamilton (1826 – April 9, 1882) was an American Presbyterian minister accused of heresy, and founder of the First Unitarian Church of Oakland.

== Life ==
Hamilton was born in Catlin, New York, near Seneca Lake. He graduated from Hamilton College in Clinton, New York in 1850. He went on to attend Auburn Theological Seminary, from which he graduated in 1853. In 1854, Hamilton became an ordained minister of the Presbyterian church in Ovid, New York.

In 1855 he was assigned the pastorage of Columbia, California, a small mining camp established during the California Gold Rush. He built the Presbyterian church that still stands there. In 1859, Hamilton came to San Jose, California, to preach at the First Presbyterian Church of San Jose. He became Superintendent of San Jose Schools, and in 1861 he travelled with William H. Brewer and Charles F. Hoffmann to the summit of a nearby mountain, as part of the initial California Geological Survey. That mountain, Mount Hamilton, is named after him.

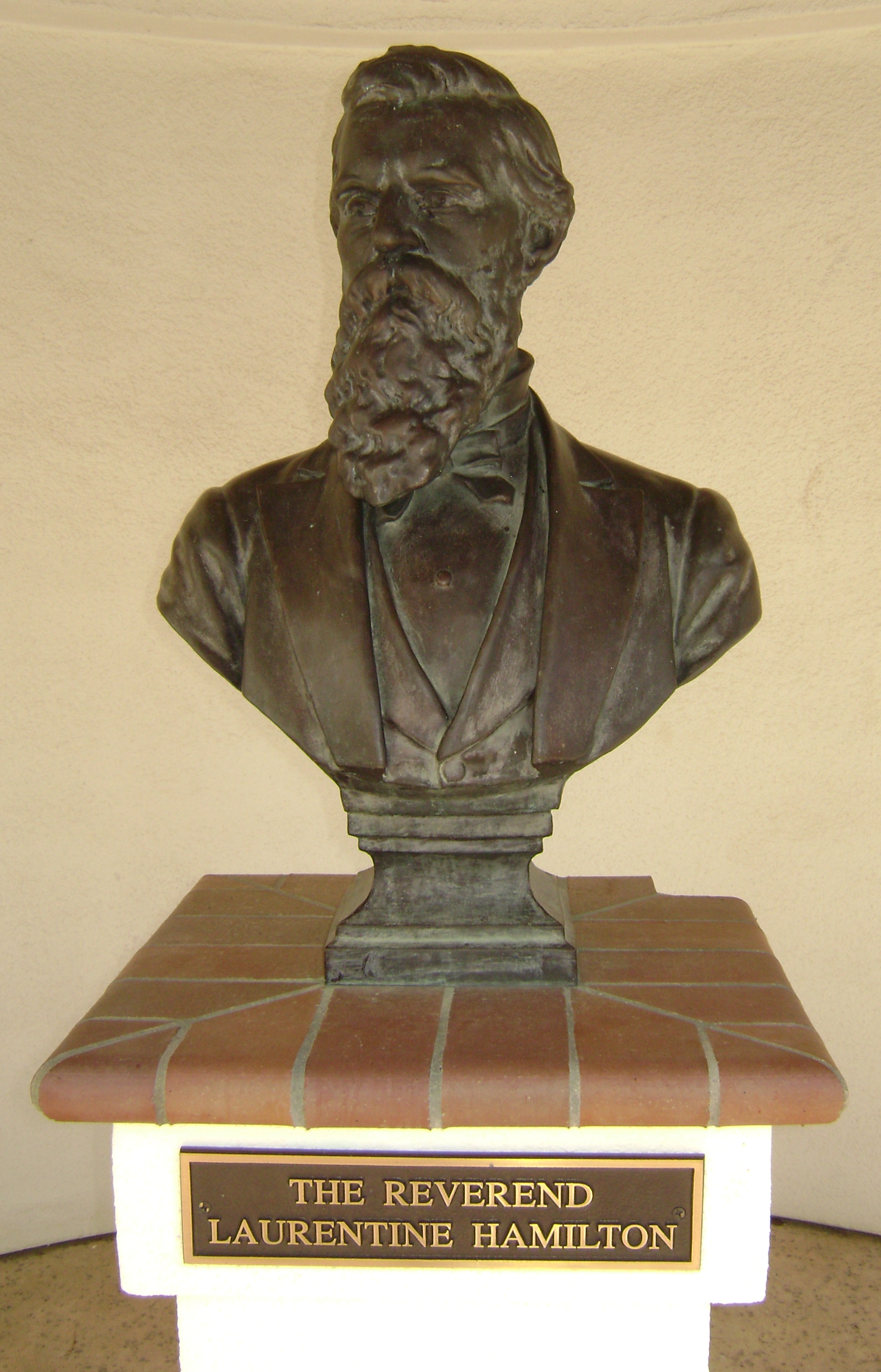
Hamilton's bust at the Lick Observatory on Mount Hamilton

In 1864 Hamilton became pastor of the First Presbyterian Church of Oakland, his sermons appearing in the Oakland Daily Tribune. He served on the Oakland Board of Education from 1866 to 1872. In 1869, Hamilton came under scrutiny for teaching the doctrine of "a second probation after death" (stating one has a second, posthumous chance of salvation). He was charged with heresy and forced to leave his pastorate and resign from his ordination in the Presbyterian church. Most of his parishioners joined him in forming the First Independent Presbyterian Church, later to become the Independent Church of Oakland. In 1879 the church joined the American Unitarian Association and became the First Unitarian Church of Oakland.

While preaching on Easter Sunday, 1882, Hamilton spoke "We know not what matter is..." and then collapsed onto the ground, dead. He is buried in the Mountain View Cemetery in Oakland, CA.
