= Oak Ridge, Virginia =

Oak Ridge, Virginia may refer to:

- Oak Ridge (Danville, Virginia), a historic plantation estate in Pittsylvania County
- Oak Ridge, Nelson County, Virginia
- Oak Ridge, Pittsylvania County, Virginia
