= Calaveras Valley =

Valley in California, United States

Coordinates: 37.4541667°N 121.8088889°W

Calaveras Valley is a small valley east of Milpitas, California which surrounds the Calaveras Reservoir. The valley is most famous as the namesake of the Calaveras Fault which bisects the valley.

See Calaveras Reservoir for more information about this valley and the fault.
