= Oak Ridge, Pennsylvania =

Oak Ridge, Pennsylvania may refer to the following places in the U.S. state of Pennsylvania:

- Oak Ridge, Armstrong County, Pennsylvania
- Oak Ridge, Clearfield County, Pennsylvania
