= Poverty Ridge =

Landform in California, US

Coordinates: 37°26′N 121°45′W

Poverty Ridge is a ridge in unincorporated Santa Clara County, California, east of Milpitas. Calaveras Valley lies to its west, while its east side slopes down to meet Arroyo Hondo. Creeks that originate on Poverty Ridge include Calaveras and Penitencia Creeks.
