= Oak Ridge (Danville, Virginia) =

Historic house in Virginia, United States

- U.S. National Register of Historic Places
- U.S. Historic district
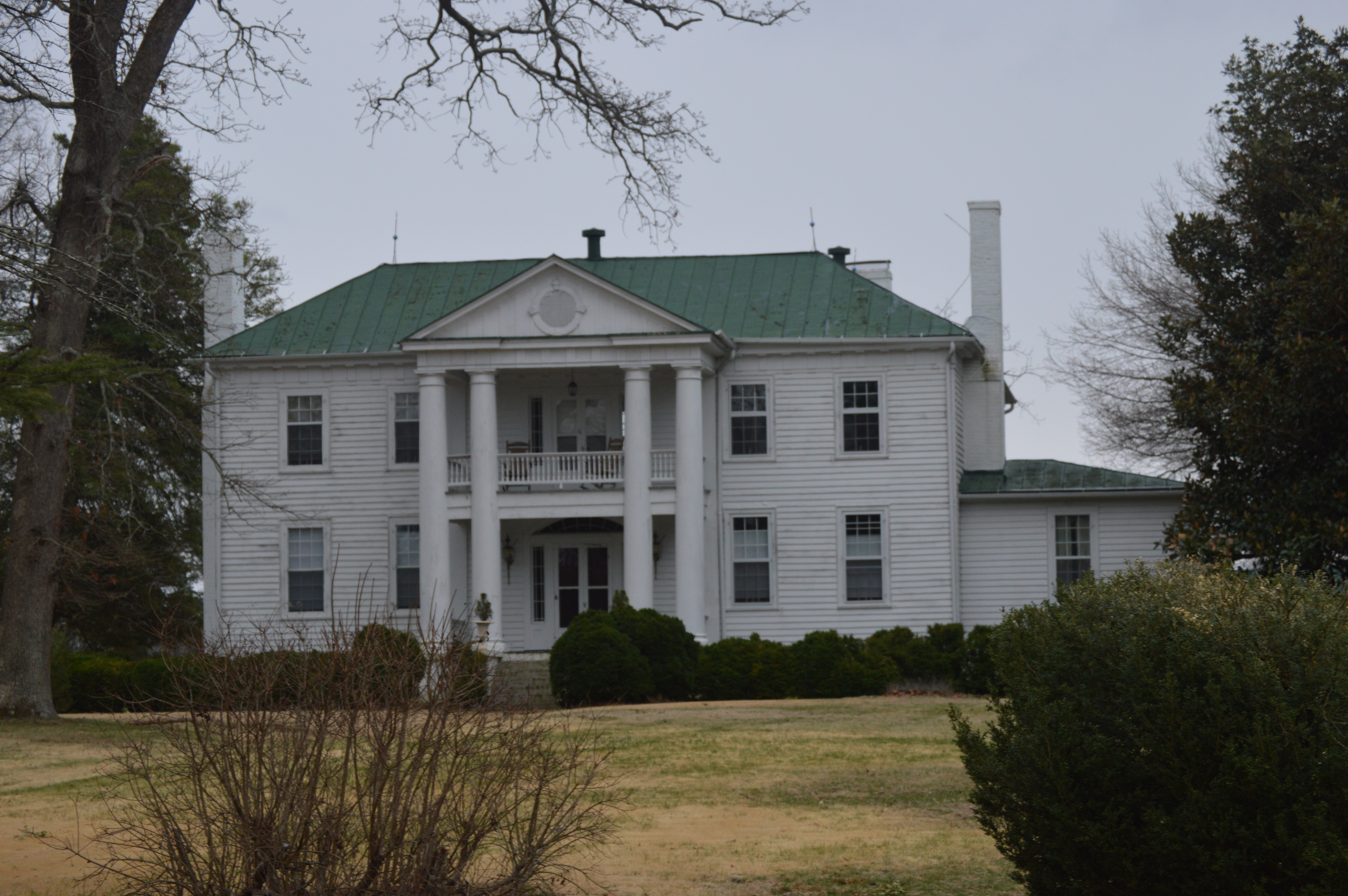
- Front of the house

- Location within Virginia Location within the United States
- Location: 2345 U.S. Route 311, west of Danville, Virginia
- Coordinates: 36°34′52″N 79°32′43″W
- Area: 32 acres (13 ha)
- Built: c. 1840
- Architectural style: Greek Revival
- NRHP reference No.: 100001515
- Added to NRHP: August 28, 2017

Oak Ridge is a historic plantation estate at 2345 Berry Hill Road (United States Route 311) in rural Pittsylvania County, Virginia, west of Danville. Originally part of a large antebellum estate, it now consists of 32 acres (13 ha) overlooking the Dan River. The estate complex includes a c. 1840 Greek Revival frame residence with a Doric temple front, and a number of outbuildings, including the original kitchen house as well as many dating from the early 20th century. The house was built for George and Justinia Adams; their daughter Emma married Doctor Robert Wilson whose office was located in one of the outbuildings. The property was listed on the National Register of Historic Places in 2017.

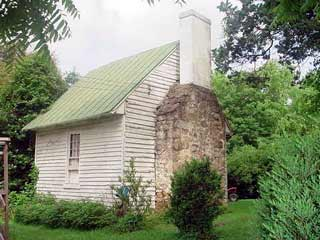
The kitchen house

== See also ==
- National Register of Historic Places listings in Pittsylvania County, Virginia
