= Oakridge High School (Oregon) =

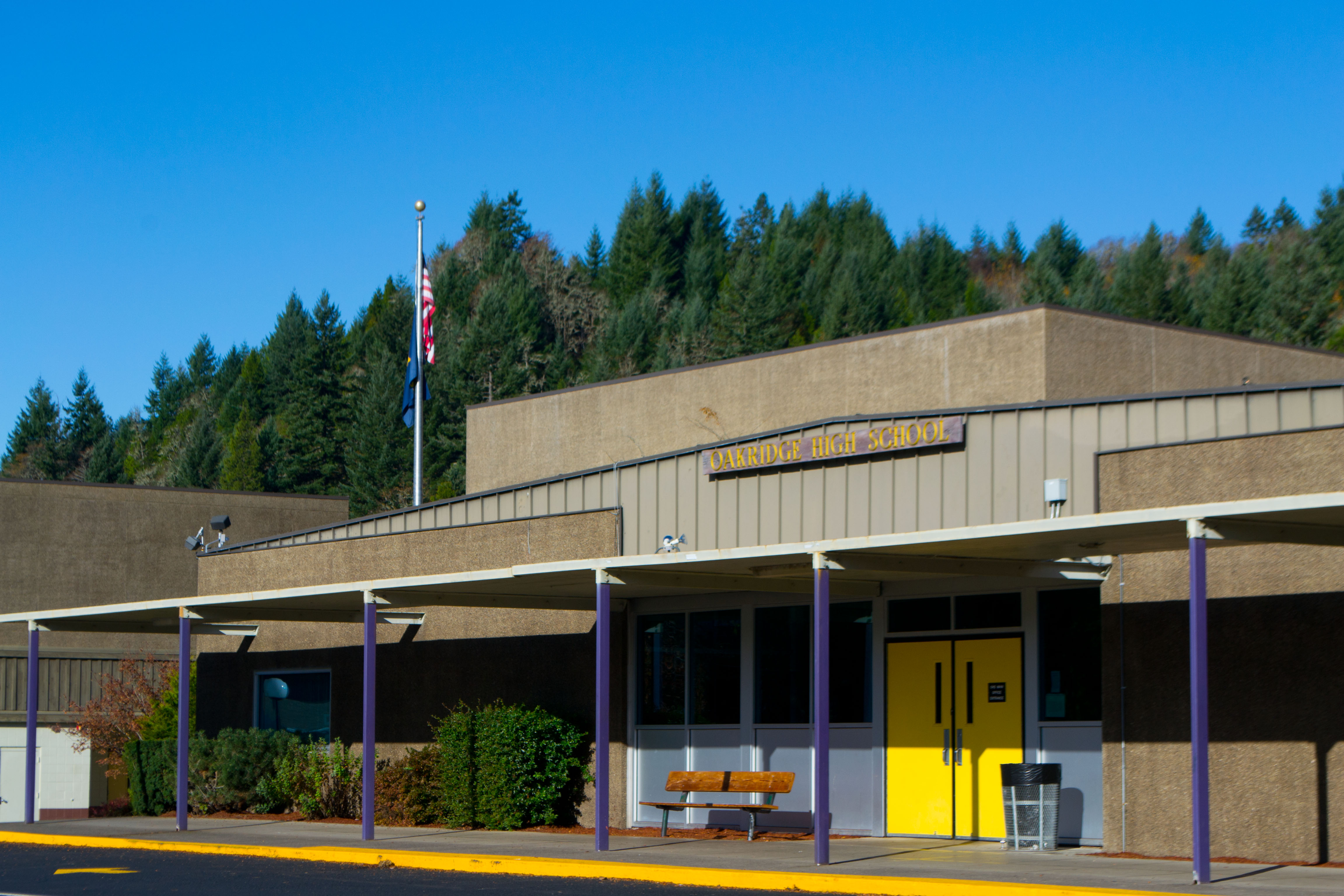

Location
- 47997 W 1st Street; Oakridge, Lane County, Oregon 97463; United States; 43.748642°N 122.468677°W

Information
- Type: Public
- School district: Oakridge School District
- Principal: Kyle Kivett
- Grades: 9–12
- Enrollment: 151 (2023–2024)
- Colors: Purple and gold
- Athletics conference: OSAA 2A-3 Valley Coast Conference
- Team name: Warriors
- Rival: Lowell
- Website: www.oakridge.k12.or.us/ojsh/index

Oakridge High School is a public high school in Oakridge, Oregon, United States. It is the first and only high school in the Oakridge School District.

== Academics ==
In 2008, 78% of the school's seniors received their high school diploma. Of 60 students, 47 graduated, 8 dropped out, 1 received a modified diploma, and 4 were still in high school.
