= The Oakridge School =

Private school in Arlington, Texas, US

Location
- 5900 West Pioneer Parkway; Arlington, Tarrant County, Texas 76013; United States; 32.723717°N 97.194207°W

Information
- Type: Private
- Established: 1979
- Grades: Preschool–12
- Enrollment: 800 (2017)
- Colors: Green and Navy
- Mascot: Owl
- Head of School: Matt Burgy
- Athletic Director: Jeromy Flowers
- Website: Official Website

The Oakridge School is a private school located in Arlington, Texas, US.

== History ==
The Oakridge School is a coeducational, non-profit college preparatory day school, accredited by the ISAS since 1988 and a member of the National Association of Independent Schools.

In December 1987, the Southern Association of Colleges and Schools accredited Oakridge.

In 2018 Oakridge added new baseball and softball fields.

== Academics ==
=== Choir & Orchestra ===
The Oakridge School is a member of the Texas Music Educators Association (TMEA), which involves over 12,000 school music educators, and the Texas Private School Music Educators Association (TPSMEA)

On April 12, 1997, the A cappella choir joined with the University of Texas at Arlington A cappella choir, under the direction of Gary Ebensberger, and the New England Symphonic Ensemble performed Faure's "Requieum" at Carnegie Hall.

Following the completion of a new John P. Flavin Fine Arts Center in 2001, Oakridge added chamber orchestra to its fine arts programs beginning in 2003-04 under the direction of the award-winning violinist Wendy Anuwe. Oakridge arts programs and faculty have long cultivated an appreciation for the arts and a lifetime involvement in music.

== Athletics ==
The school's sports teams are known as the Owls and compete in the Southwest Preparatory Conference (SPC) along with 16 other college preparatory schools primarily from Texas. Oakridge teams face a variety of schools, including public schools on occasion. Oakridge often competes against Texas Association of Private and Parochial Schools or TAPPS schools.

Students in grades 7 thru 12 can participate in as many as 16 different sports over three seasons during the school year. Fall season choices include: Football, Volleyball, Cross Country, Field Hockey, and Cheerleading; Winter season: Basketball, Soccer, Wrestling, Power Lifting, Swimming, and Equestrian; Spring: Baseball, Golf, Tennis, Track & Field, and Softball. Oakridge Owls regularly compete against other Southwest Preparatory Conference schools as Episcopal High School (Bellaire, Texas), St. Mark's School (Dallas, Texas), The Casady School (Norman, Oklahoma), and many others in Houston, Austin, San Antonio, Fort Worth, Dallas, Oklahoma City, and Tulsa, Oklahoma.

== Notable alumni ==
- 1996: JT Hodges, pop singer/country music performer; opened for Eric Church
- 1996: Marin P. Heiskell, Miss Teenage Texas
- 2003: Bruno Guarda, professional soccer player
- 2006: Andre Akpan, professional soccer player
- 2008: Chris Babb, professional basketball player in the Israeli Basketball Premier League
- 2010: Tayo Fabuluje, professional football player; drafted by the Chicago Bears in 2015
