= Calaveras Reservoir =

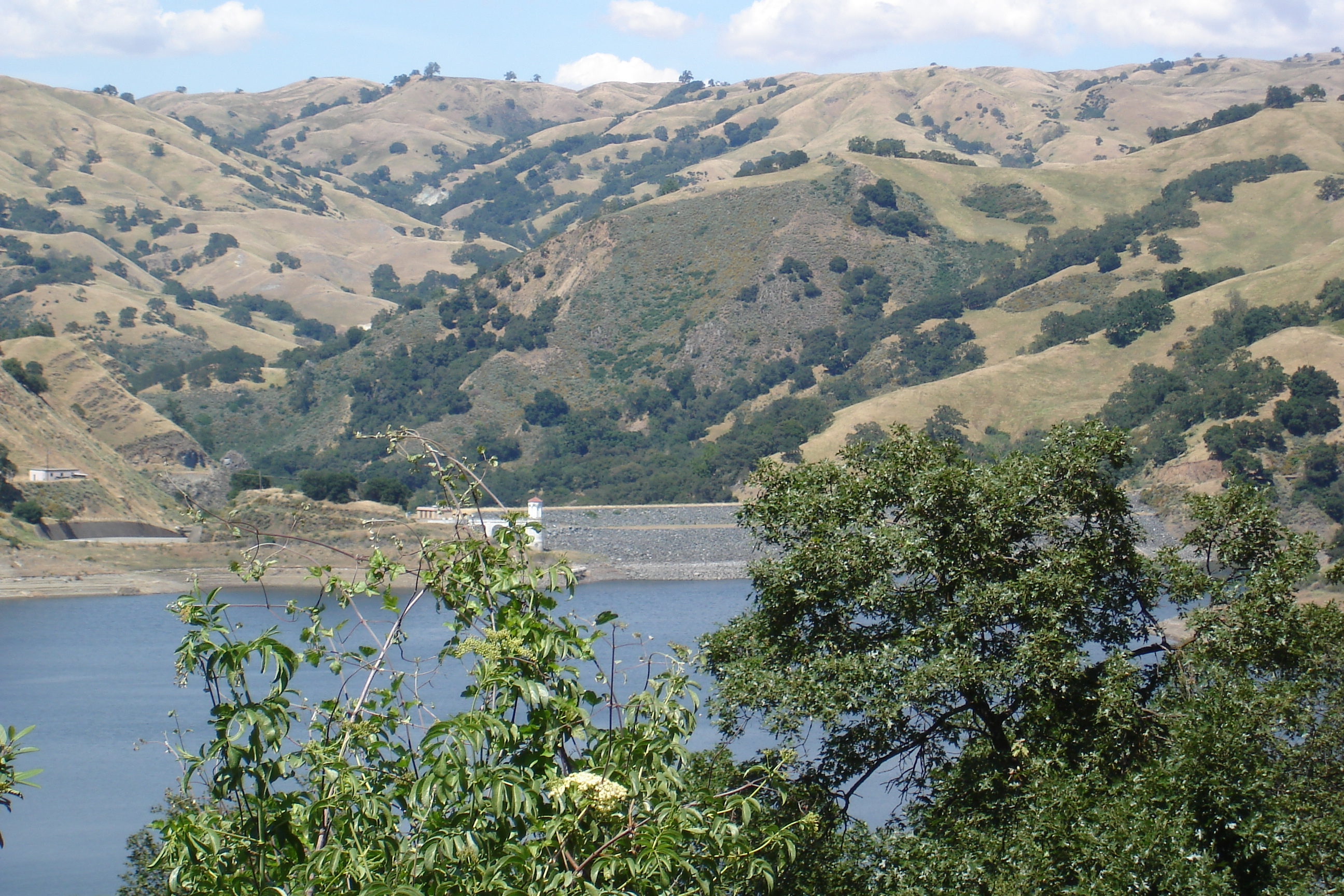

- Location within California Location within the United States
- Location: Santa Clara / Alameda counties, California, US
- Coordinates: 37.4785°N 121.8226°W
- Type: Reservoir
- Primary inflows: Arroyo Hondo; Calaveras Creek
- Catchment area: 98.4 sq mi (255 km^{2})
- Basin countries: United States
- Built: 1925; 101 years ago (replaced 2019; 7 years ago)
- Surface area: 1,450 acres (590 ha)
- Water volume: 96,850 acre⋅ft (119,460,000 m^{3}) (design)
- Surface elevation: 781 feet (238 m)

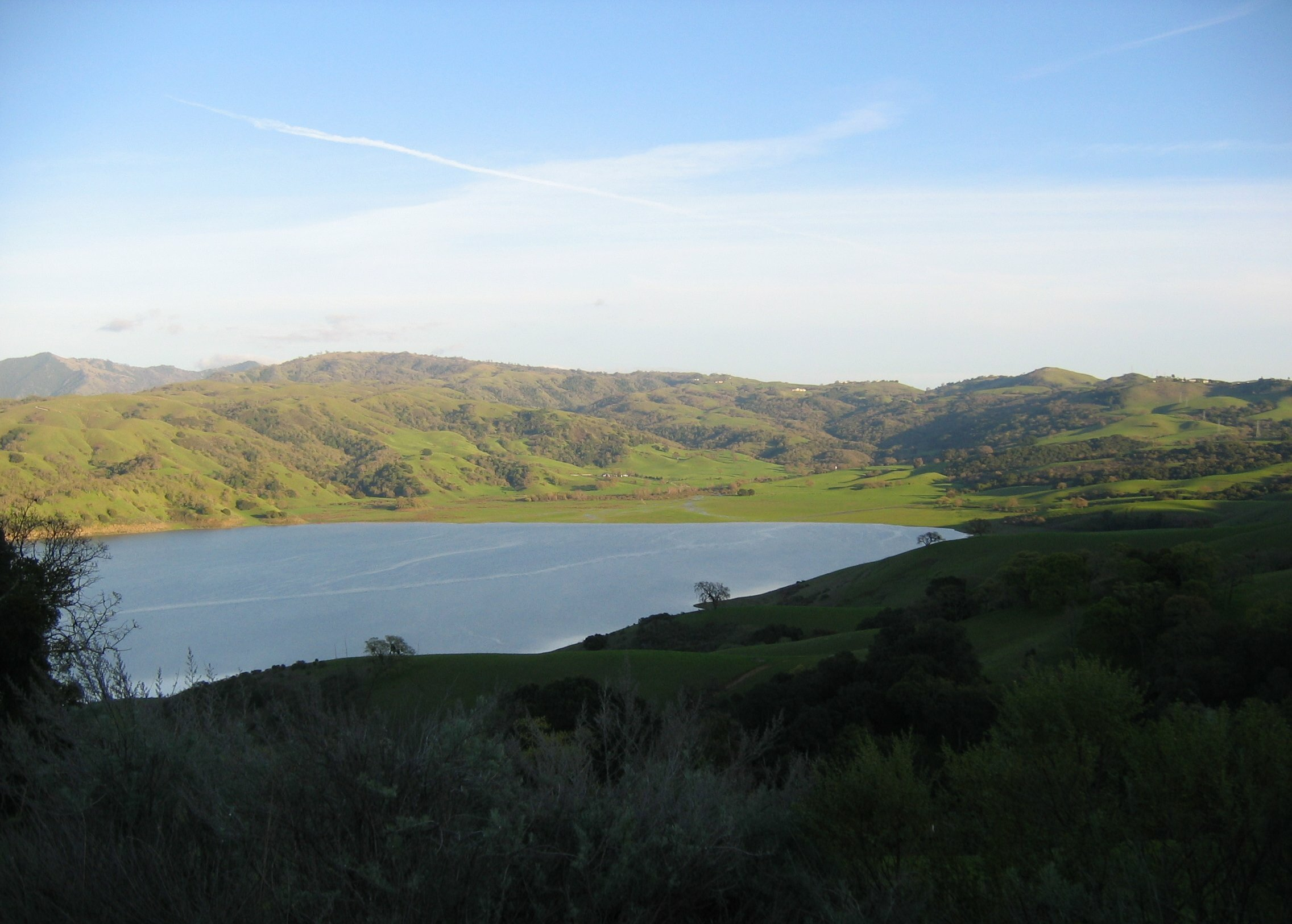
Calaveras Reservoir in Spring 2006

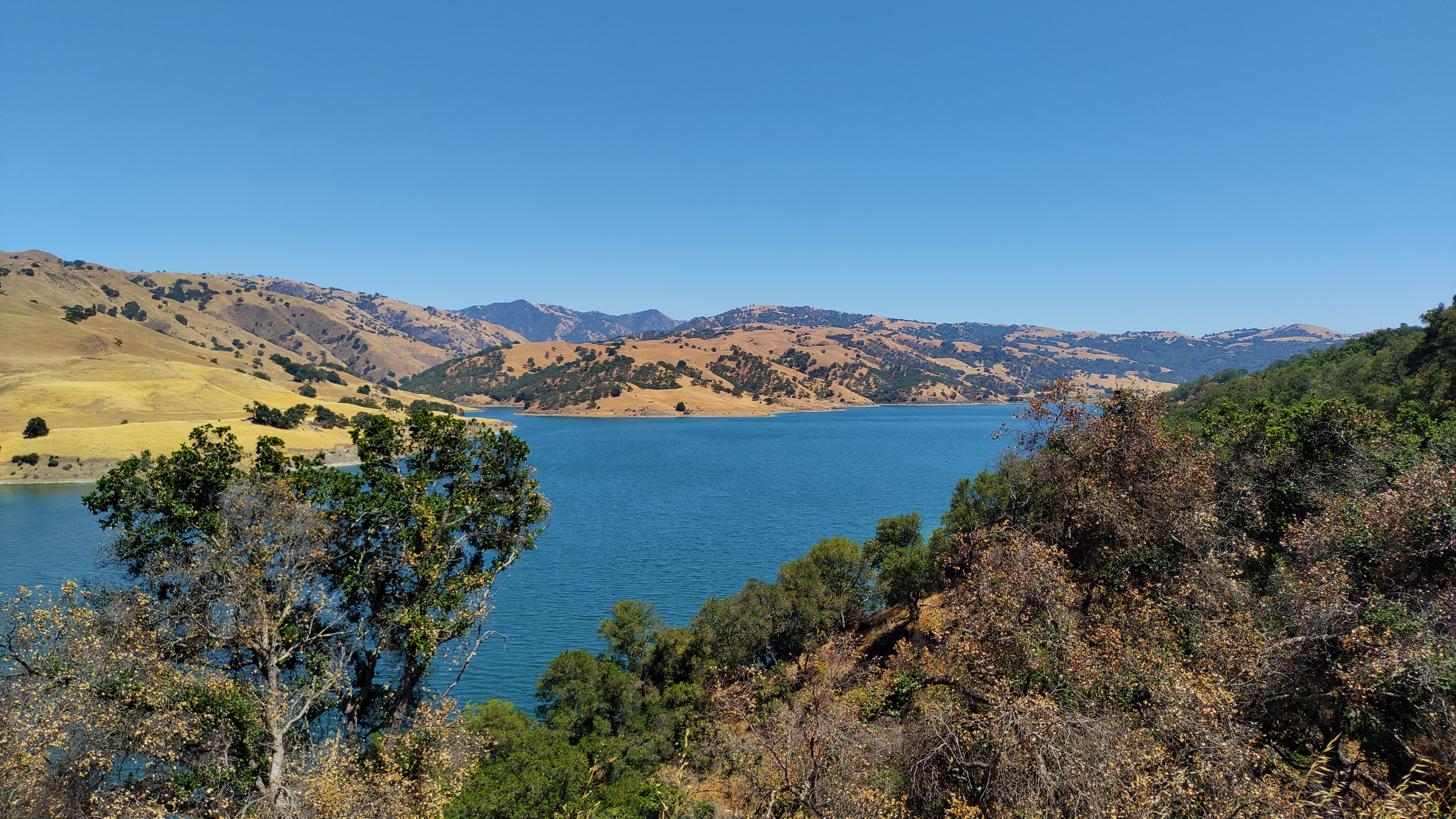
Calaveras Reservoir in June 2021

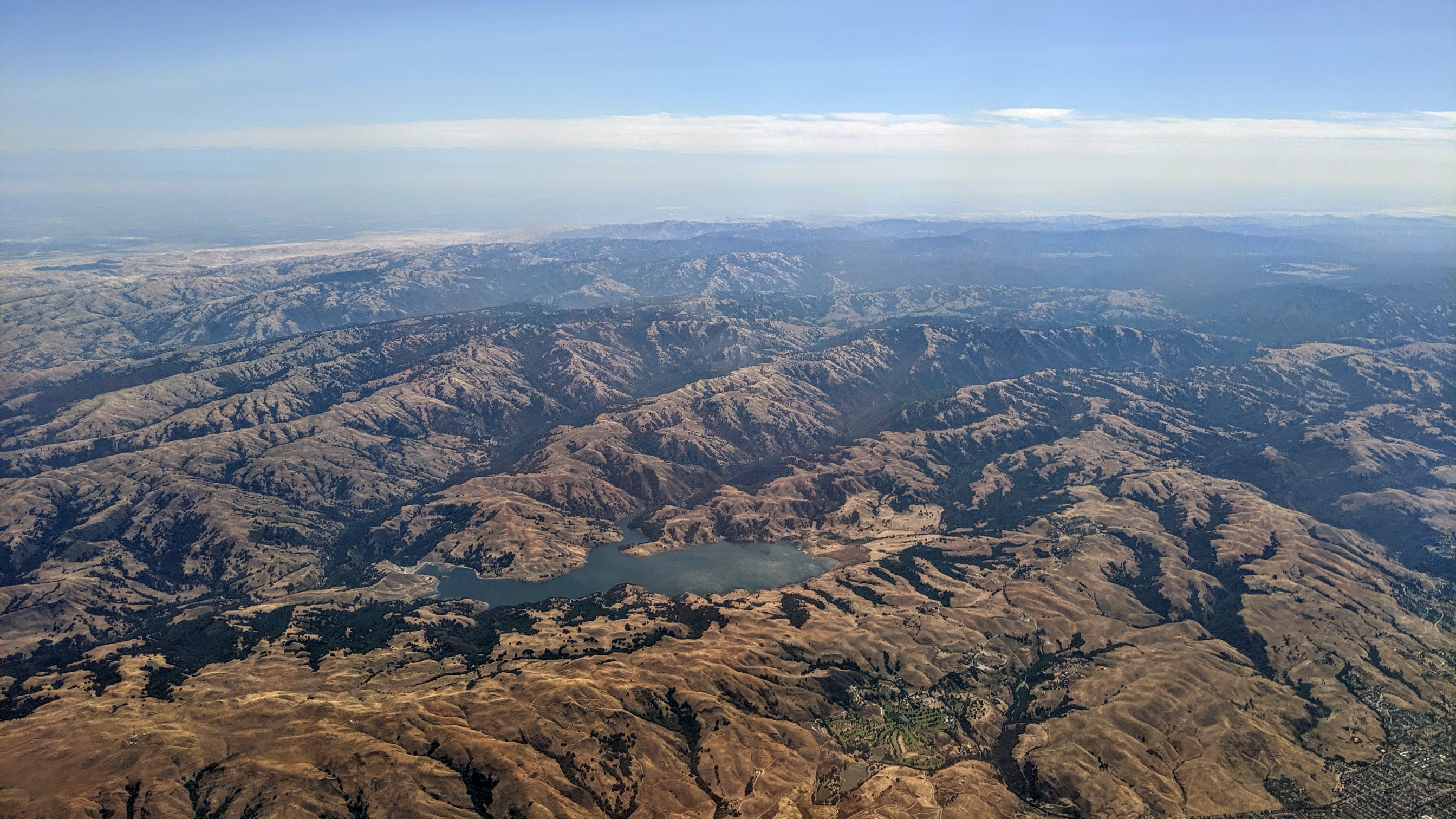
Aerial view from over north San Jose

Calaveras Reservoir is located primarily in Santa Clara County, California, with a small portion and its dam in Alameda County, California. In Spanish, Calaveras means "skulls".

The reservoir is fed mainly by Arroyo Hondo and Calaveras Creek. Lying in the Calaveras Valley, the region is geologically active with the Calaveras Fault parallel to and to the west of the dam site. The seismic hazard forced replacement of the original dam. The replacement dam began construction in 2011 and was completed in 2019.

The Calaveras Valley has diverse wildlife including deer, coyotes, squirrels, turkey vultures, red-winged blackbirds, yellow-billed magpies, red-tailed hawks, brewer's blackbirds, purple martins, barn swallows, bullock's orioles, and warblers. Since at least 2008, a pair of bald eagles has nested regularly.

== History ==
In the 19th century, the Calaveras Valley which the reservoir now fills was primarily an agricultural region known for its production of hay, strawberries, and tomatoes. Because of San Francisco's increasing demand for drinking water at the turn of the 20th century, the farmers in the region were forced to sell their land to the Spring Valley Water Company, which in turn sold it to the San Francisco Water Company.

The first dam on the site, built in 1913 by the Spring Valley Water Company, rapidly changed the sensitive hydrology and natural environment of the Calaveras Valley. That dam suffered a collapse of the upstream slope in 1918 due to design and material flaws. The second dam, which stood until 2019, was the largest earth-fill dam in the world when completed in 1925. It was 245 feet high, with a length of 1200 feet at its crest. Due to concerns about its seismic rating, the 1925 dam was replaced by a new third dam constructed just downstream from 2014 to 2019.

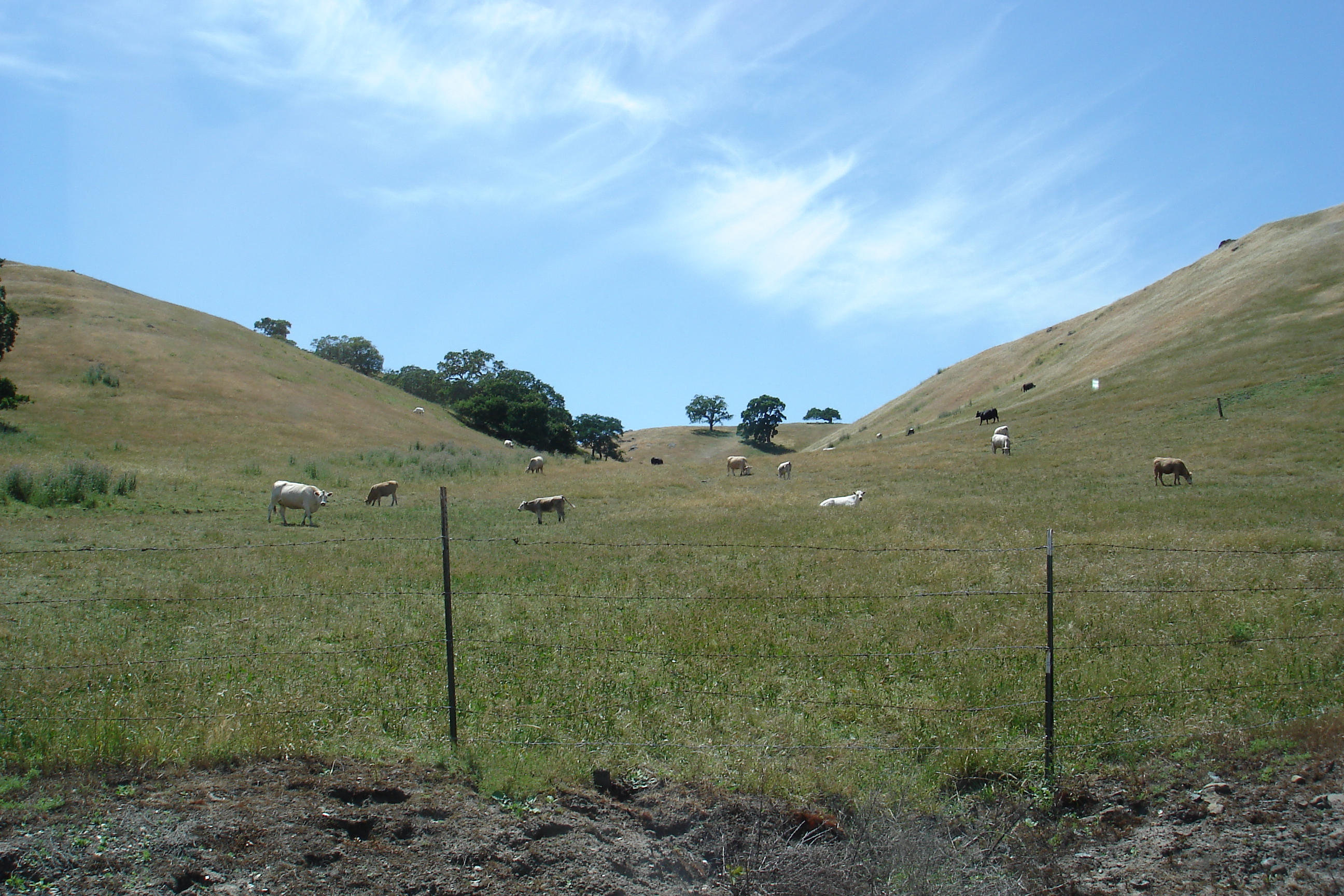
Livestock along Calaveras Road, May 2006

The reservoir is reported to contain a large population of largemouth bass, rainbow trout and other species. However, fishing is prohibited.

The San Francisco Public Utilities Commission (SFPUC) owns 36,000 acres (150 km^{2}) in the Alameda Creek Watershed. Some lands in the watershed are leased to livestock companies for cattle ranching to control vegetation and prevent fires. Most of the land is closed to the public because of concerns over drinking water safety and quality.

=== Dam replacement ===
The dam site is near the Calaveras Fault, and the replacement dam was seismically vulnerable. If the dam had collapsed when full, it would have flooded parts of Fremont, California with a wall of water 30 ft (9.1 m) high. Dam regulators for the state of California restricted the capacity of the original dam in 2001, to mitigate the seismic threat. The capacity of the original dam was limited to about one-third of the nominal 100,000 acre-feet (120 million cubic meters).

To restore lost capacity, the San Francisco Public Utilities Commission constructed a second replacement dam located 1,000 ft (300 m) downstream from the original 1925 replacement dam. The dam replacement took twice as long (eight years instead of four years) and cost twice as much as originally scheduled. Hazardous geological conditions were discovered near the proposed west abutment in 2012 and near the proposed spillway. The dam site was weakened by at least two ancient landslides. When construction started in 2011, the budget was $420 million, and completion was expected in 2015. The seismic redesign required three million additional cubic yards (two million cubic meters) of excavation, far more than the original seven million cubic yards (five million cubic meters). The spillway had to be relocated away from one of the ancient landslides, delaying the project by another year. As of 2017, the completion had been pushed back to spring or summer 2019, and the cost had risen to $810 million.

The design of the replacement dam allows for future capacity expansion, and the core is wider than needed initially. The design allows the height to be raised by 150 ft (46 m), to quadruple the initial capacity of 100,000 acre⋅ft (120,000,000 m^{3}). On completion of the replacement dam, a third of the old dam was removed to allow the reservoir to be impounded by the new dam instead.

The construction project allocated funds to restore populations of native fish in other parts of the watershed. A ladder for Steelhead trout (Oncorhynchus mykiss) at the dam itself was deemed infeasible. At 290 feet (88 m), it would have been the tallest fish ladder in the US and would have cost $40 million. The SFPUC did assure environmental groups that it will release water from the replacement dam to improve summer flows. A smaller fish ladder is under construction at a separate diversion dam on upper Alameda Creek, regarded as prime trout habitat.

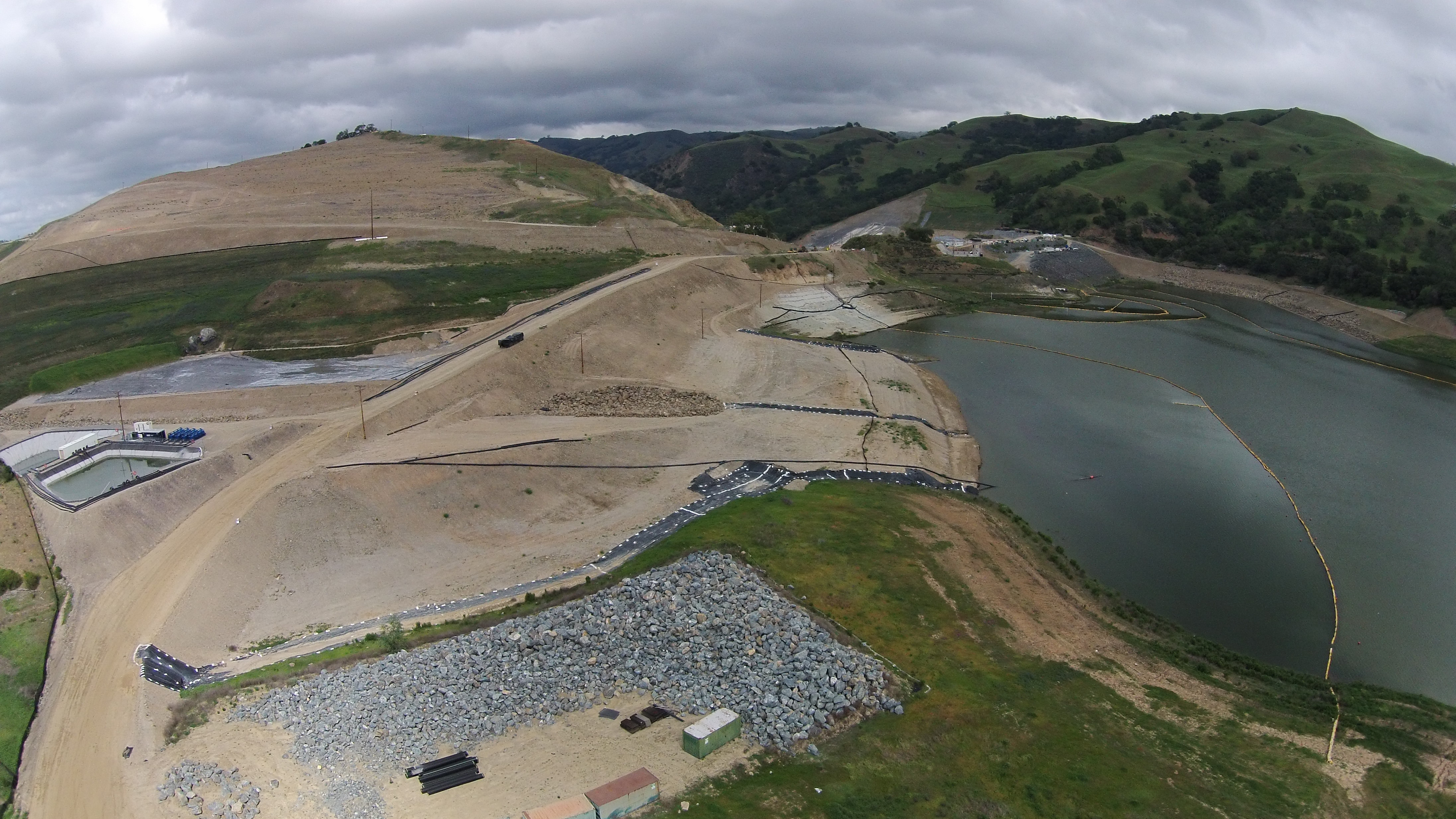
Aerial view of Calaveras Reservoir showing the reconstruction of the dam wall

== Ecology ==
Facing legal challenges to release flows to support steelhead trout (Oncorhynchus mykiss) in the 20 miles (32 km) of Calaveras Creek below the dam, the San Francisco Public Utilities Commission (SFPUC) began steady releases after the dam was re-built in 2018. The steady flow releases, and accompanying lowered water temperatures, resulted in a sharp increase in the numbers of trout.

== Plane crash discovery ==
In the late 1980s and early 1990s, a drought affected California, and water levels in reservoirs throughout the state became extraordinarily low. By January 1991, the water at the reservoir was down 100 feet (30 m), and the aluminum body of an airplane became visible. Two skeletons were found at the site on January 5, 1991. Dental records and the plane's serial number were used to positively identify the remains as Clifford Gillman and his single-engine Ercoupe, along with Gillman's friend Robert Louviere. They had been missing since June 16, 1963. The wreck, minus the two men's remains, is still lying in the center of the reservoir.

== See also ==
- Arroyo Hondo (Santa Clara County, California)
- Black Mountain (Milpitas, California)
- List of dams and reservoirs in California
- List of lakes in California
