= Mount Hamilton (California) =

Mountain in California, United States

- Sierra de Santa Isabel
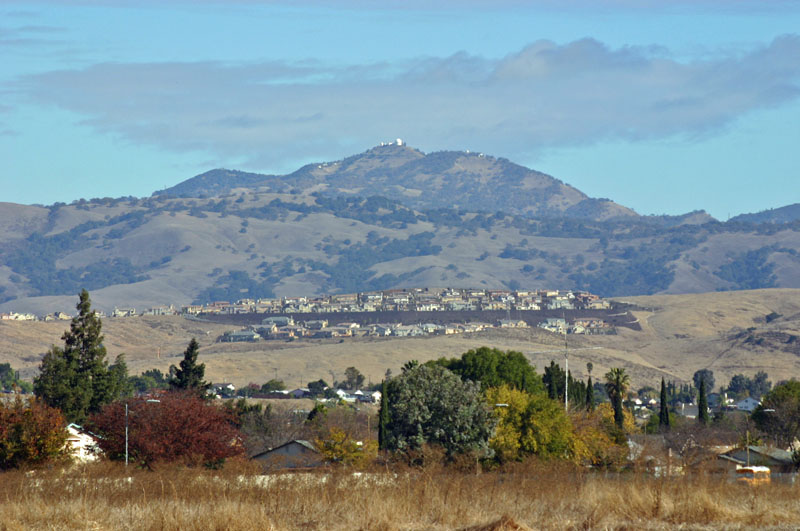
- Lick Observatory is visible atop Mount Hamilton; hillsides show typical early-autumn golden (dry) vegetation

Highest point
- Elevation: 4,265 ft (1,300 m) NAVD 88
- Prominence: 16 m (52 ft)
- Coordinates: 37°20′30.2″N 121°38′34.2″W

Geography
- Location within California
- Location: Santa Clara County, California, U.S.
- Parent range: Diablo Range
- Topo map: USGS Lick Observatory

Geology
- Rock age: Upper Cretaceous

Climbing
- First ascent: 1861
- Easiest route: Hike

Mount Hamilton is a mountain in the Diablo Range in Santa Clara County, California. The mountain's peak, at 4,265 feet (1,300 m), overlooks the heavily urbanized Santa Clara Valley and is the site of Lick Observatory, the world's first permanently occupied mountain-top observatory. The asteroid 452 Hamiltonia, discovered in 1899, is named after the mountain. Golden eagle nesting sites are found on the slopes of Mount Hamilton. On clear days, Mount Tamalpais, the Santa Cruz Mountains, Monterey Bay, the Monterey Peninsula, and even Yosemite National Park are visible from the summit of the mountain.

== History ==
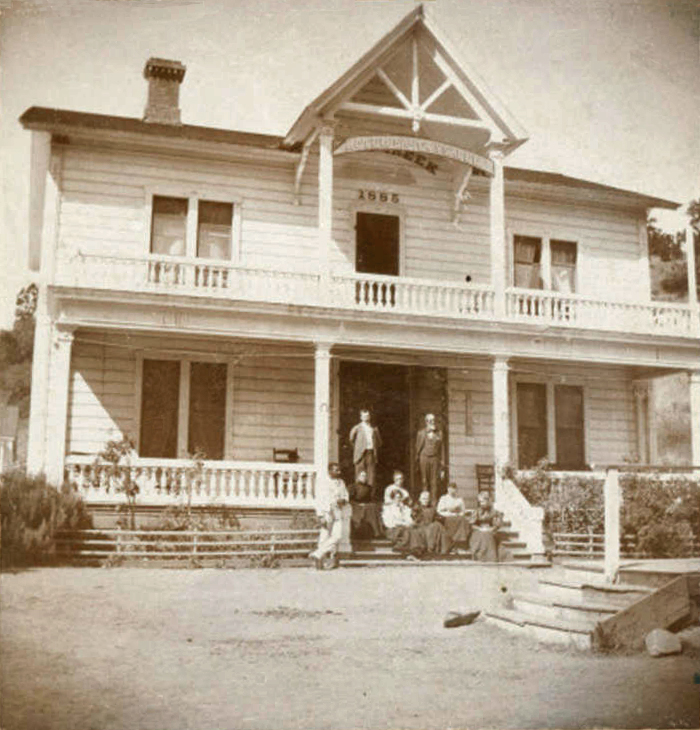
Hotel Santa Ysabel on the road up Mt. Hamilton just across Smith Creek in 1895, Courtesy of San Jose Public Library, California Room

On August 26, 1861, while working for Josiah D. Whitney on the first California Geological Survey, William H. Brewer invited local San Jose preacher (and Brewer's personal friend) Laurentine Hamilton to join his company on a trek to a nearby summit. Nearing completion of their journey, Hamilton, in good humor, bounded for the summit ahead of the rest of the men and claimed his stake. In fact, Brewer suggested the mountain be named after Hamilton, only after Whitney declined to have the mountain named after him (a different mountain was later named Mount Whitney).

The Spanish name for Mt. Hamilton was the Sierra de Santa Isabel and the highest point was originally known as Mount Isabel instead of Mount Hamilton. William Henry Brewer and his fellow geologist, Charles F. Hoffmann, did not know it already had a name, and named it Mt. Hamilton, although they did place Isabel Valley on their map to the east. The "Hotel Santa Ysabel" was built on the road up the mountain in 1885 on Smith Creek. When in 1895, the USGS realized that the peak two miles southeast of Mt. Hamilton was as tall (4,193 ft or 1,278 m), they named it Mt. Isabel.

== Climate ==
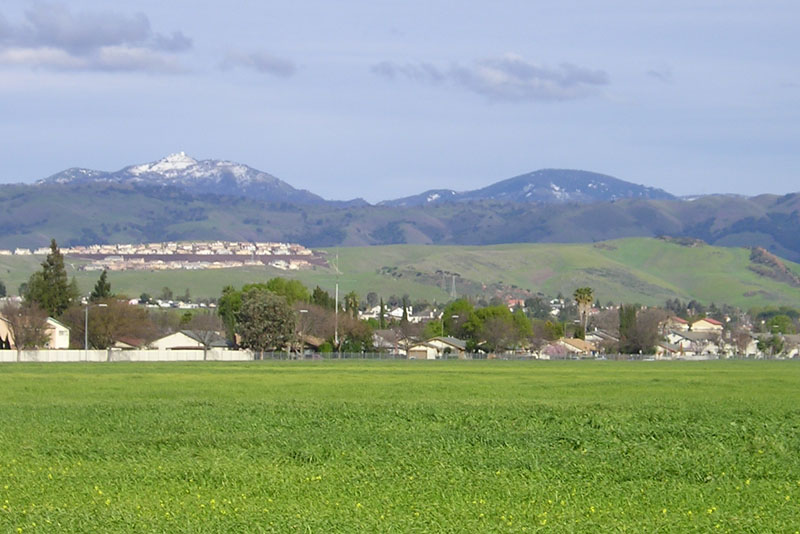
Numerous times each winter temperatures drop low enough for Mount Hamilton (left) to receive as much as a foot of snow for a day or two.

These mountains are high enough to receive snowfall in the winter, perhaps up to a dozen times. Occasionally, when a cold, wet storm comes in from the Gulf of Alaska or Canada, Mt. Hamilton and the surrounding peaks get significant snowfall. In February 2001, 30 inches (76 cm) of snow fell, and in March 2006, the peak was left with over a foot (30 cm) of snow in one night.

The National Weather Service has had a cooperative weather station on the summit of Mount Hamilton almost since the time that the Lick Observatory opened. It has provided a glimpse of the extreme weather conditions that occur on the Diablo Range, especially in the winter months.

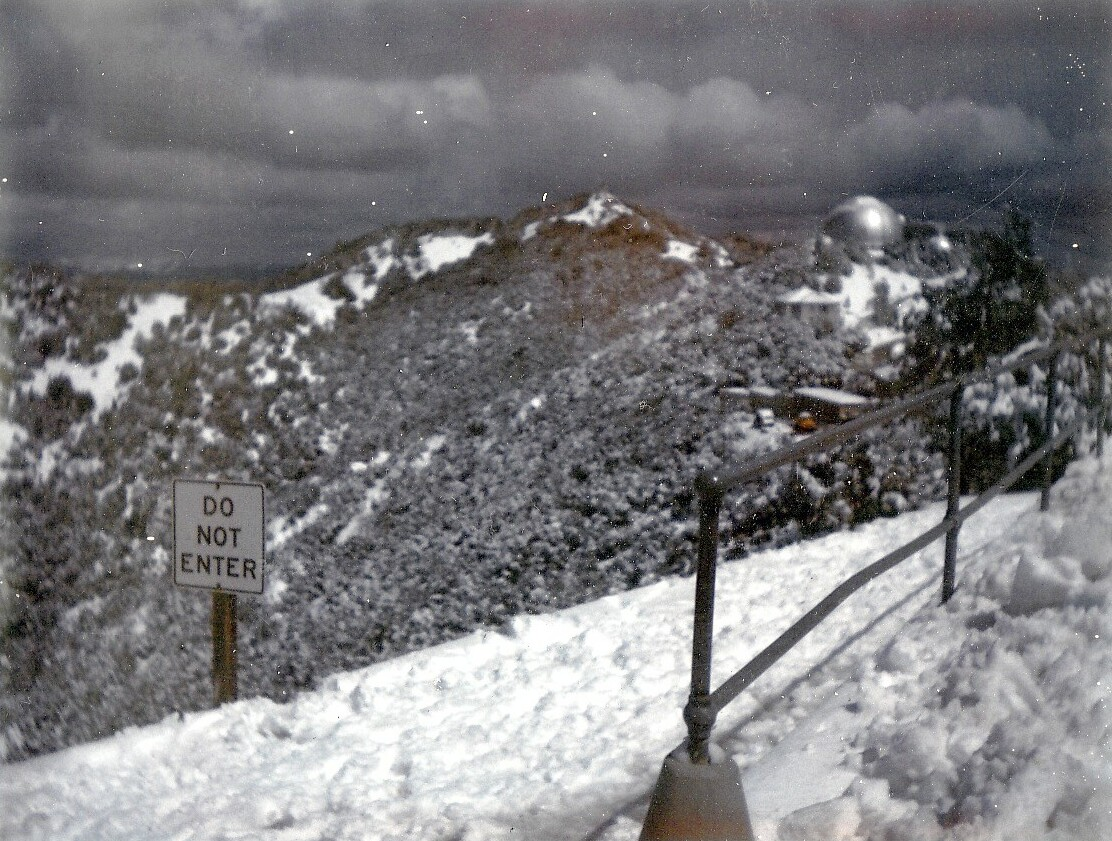
Mt. Hamilton had a foot of snow on the ground on April 1, 1967

February is the coldest month on average on Mount Hamilton with an average high of 48.7 °F (9.3 °C) and an average low of 37.8 °F (3.2 °C). The warmest month on average is July with an average high of 78.7 °F (25.9 °C) and an average low of 65.1 °F (18.4 °C). Due to frequent thermal inversions during the summer, it is often warmer on Mount Hamilton than in San Jose. The record high temperature of 103 °F (39 °C) was on August 5, 1978. The record low temperature of 7 °F (−14 °C) was on December 21, 1990. The average days with highs of 90 °F (32 °C) or higher is 2.8 days. The average days with lows of 32 °F (0 °C) or lower is 44.9 days.

Annual precipitation averages 23.71 inches (602 mm). Measurable precipitation occurs on an average of 78.2 days each year. The most precipitation in a month was 21.55 inches (547 mm) in December 1955; no rainfall has been common during the summer months. The maximum rainfall in 24 hours was 6.87 inches (174 mm) on December 23, 1955.

Annual snowfall averages 18.1 inches (46 cm). The maximum snowfall in a year was 59.0 inches (150 cm) in 1955. The maximum snowfall in a month was 33.6 inches (85 cm) in January 1950. The 24-hour maximum snowfall of 16.0 inches (41 cm) occurred on April 10, 1965. The deepest daily snow depth was 24 inches (61 cm) in December 1970. Measurable snow has been recorded in every month from October through May.

Climate data for Mount Hamilton, California (Station Elevation 4,206ft), 1991–2020 normals, extremes 1948–present
| Month | Jan | Feb | Mar | Apr | May | Jun | Jul | Aug | Sep | Oct | Nov | Dec | Year |
|---|---|---|---|---|---|---|---|---|---|---|---|---|---|
| Record high °F (°C) | 74 (23) | 73 (23) | 77 (25) | 84 (29) | 91 (33) | 94 (34) | 100 (38) | 103 (39) | 99 (37) | 93 (34) | 81 (27) | 76 (24) | 103 (39) |
| Mean maximum °F (°C) | 65.0 (18.3) | 63.8 (17.7) | 66.3 (19.1) | 72.3 (22.4) | 78.4 (25.8) | 85.5 (29.7) | 89.4 (31.9) | 89.0 (31.7) | 86.8 (30.4) | 80.3 (26.8) | 71.2 (21.8) | 63.3 (17.4) | 91.6 (33.1) |
| Mean daily maximum °F (°C) | 49.6 (9.8) | 48.7 (9.3) | 51.2 (10.7) | 55.2 (12.9) | 62.3 (16.8) | 71.1 (21.7) | 78.7 (25.9) | 78.5 (25.8) | 74.5 (23.6) | 65.5 (18.6) | 54.7 (12.6) | 48.6 (9.2) | 61.6 (16.4) |
| Daily mean °F (°C) | 44.4 (6.9) | 43.2 (6.2) | 45.1 (7.3) | 48.0 (8.9) | 54.9 (12.7) | 63.5 (17.5) | 71.9 (22.2) | 71.5 (21.9) | 67.4 (19.7) | 58.9 (14.9) | 49.1 (9.5) | 43.3 (6.3) | 55.1 (12.8) |
| Mean daily minimum °F (°C) | 39.1 (3.9) | 37.8 (3.2) | 38.9 (3.8) | 40.7 (4.8) | 47.4 (8.6) | 55.9 (13.3) | 65.1 (18.4) | 64.6 (18.1) | 60.3 (15.7) | 52.4 (11.3) | 43.4 (6.3) | 38.0 (3.3) | 48.6 (9.2) |
| Mean minimum °F (°C) | 25.7 (−3.5) | 25.6 (−3.6) | 26.4 (−3.1) | 27.6 (−2.4) | 32.8 (0.4) | 37.4 (3.0) | 50.2 (10.1) | 50.0 (10.0) | 41.4 (5.2) | 36.3 (2.4) | 29.8 (−1.2) | 25.6 (−3.6) | 21.6 (−5.8) |
| Record low °F (°C) | 10 (−12) | 12 (−11) | 17 (−8) | 19 (−7) | 25 (−4) | 28 (−2) | 34 (1) | 38 (3) | 35 (2) | 20 (−7) | 18 (−8) | 7 (−14) | 7 (−14) |
| Average precipitation inches (mm) | 5.03 (128) | 4.79 (122) | 4.42 (112) | 2.22 (56) | 1.30 (33) | 0.28 (7.1) | 0.00 (0.00) | 0.05 (1.3) | 0.17 (4.3) | 1.34 (34) | 2.99 (76) | 4.72 (120) | 27.31 (694) |
| Average snowfall inches (cm) | 4.2 (11) | 5.3 (13) | 3.8 (9.7) | 1.8 (4.6) | 0.0 (0.0) | 0.0 (0.0) | 0.0 (0.0) | 0.0 (0.0) | 0.0 (0.0) | 0.0 (0.0) | 0.9 (2.3) | 2.1 (5.3) | 18.1 (46) |
| Average precipitation days (≥ 0.01 in) | 12.1 | 11.9 | 11.2 | 8.4 | 5.5 | 2.0 | 0.1 | 0.5 | 1.6 | 4.3 | 8.5 | 12.1 | 78.2 |
| Average snowy days (≥ 0.1 in) | 2.3 | 2.6 | 2.3 | 1.7 | 0.0 | 0.0 | 0.0 | 0.0 | 0.0 | 0.0 | 0.5 | 1.4 | 10.8 |
Source 1: NOAA
Source 2: National Weather Service

== Geography ==
=== Copernicus Peak ===
Mount Hamilton is one summit along a mile-long ridge. Other than Hamilton, peaks along the ridge have astronomical names, such as Kepler. The highest peak on the ridge is Copernicus Peak, with elevation 4,360+ ft (1,330+ m). Copernicus Peak is located 0.8 miles (1.3 km) to the northeast from Mount Hamilton, and is the highest point in Santa Clara County. Unlike Mount Hamilton's limited prominence, Copernicus Peak has a prominence of 3,080 ft (940 m).

=== Mount Hamilton Road ===
State Route 130 begins its ascent from the junction at Alum Rock Road.

The sinuous 19-mile (31 km) Mt. Hamilton Road (part of State Route 130) is commonly used by bicyclists and motorcyclists. Built in 1875–76 in anticipation of the observatory, and the need to carry materials and equipment up the mountain in horse-drawn wagons, the grade seldom exceeds 6.5 percent. The road rises over 4,000 feet (1,200 m) in three long climbs from San Jose to the mountain top. On a clear day at the summit it is possible to see the Sierra Nevada.

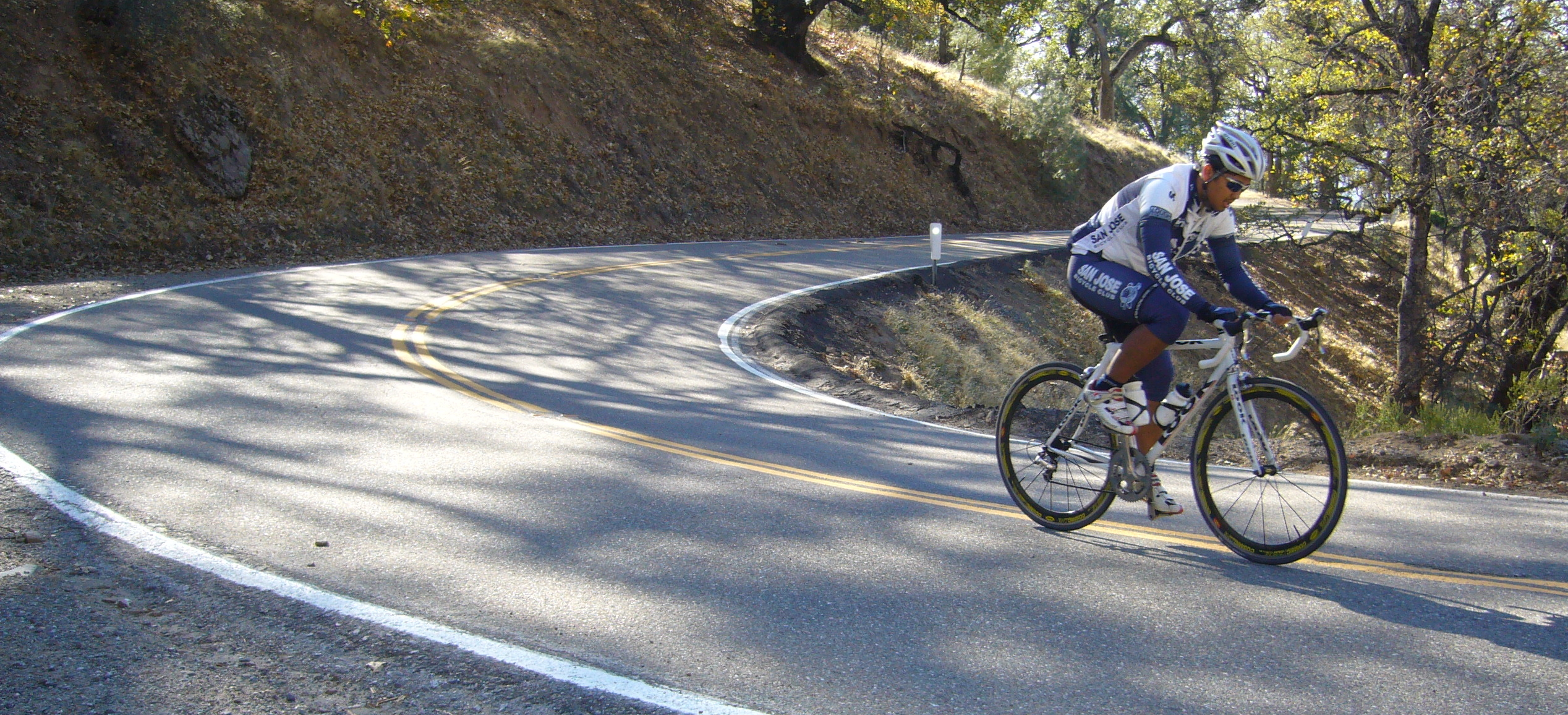
Mt. Hamilton Road is popular with cycling clubs.

Cyclists commonly use the road because of the long but not overly challenging nature of the climb, sparse vehicular traffic over most of its length, and the views of San Jose and the Santa Clara Valley below. There is an annual cycling challenge climb in April. Thanksgiving consistently draws hundreds of cyclists and is frequently the final climb in the annual Low-Key Hillclimb Series which attracts some of the region's best climbers.

The bicycle ride is just over 19 miles (31 km) from the Alum Rock Avenue junction. The upward trek is interrupted by two descents, first into Grant Ranch County Park, and again to cross Smith Creek. Quimby Road offers a shorter way from San Jose to Grant Ranch, but is considerably steeper. The main observatory building offers free 15-minute guided tours of the Great Lick refracting telescope.

== Geology and hydrology ==
Much of the foothill slopes of Mount Hamilton is underlain by Miocene age sandstone of the Briones formation: this bedrock is locally soft and weathered in the upper few feet, but grades locally to very hard at depth. Depth to groundwater on these foothill areas of Mount Hamilton is approximately 240 feet (73 m). The Babb Creek drainage comprises some of the watershed draining the slopes of Mount Hamilton. The Calaveras and Hayward active earthquake faults traverse the slopes of Mount Hamilton.

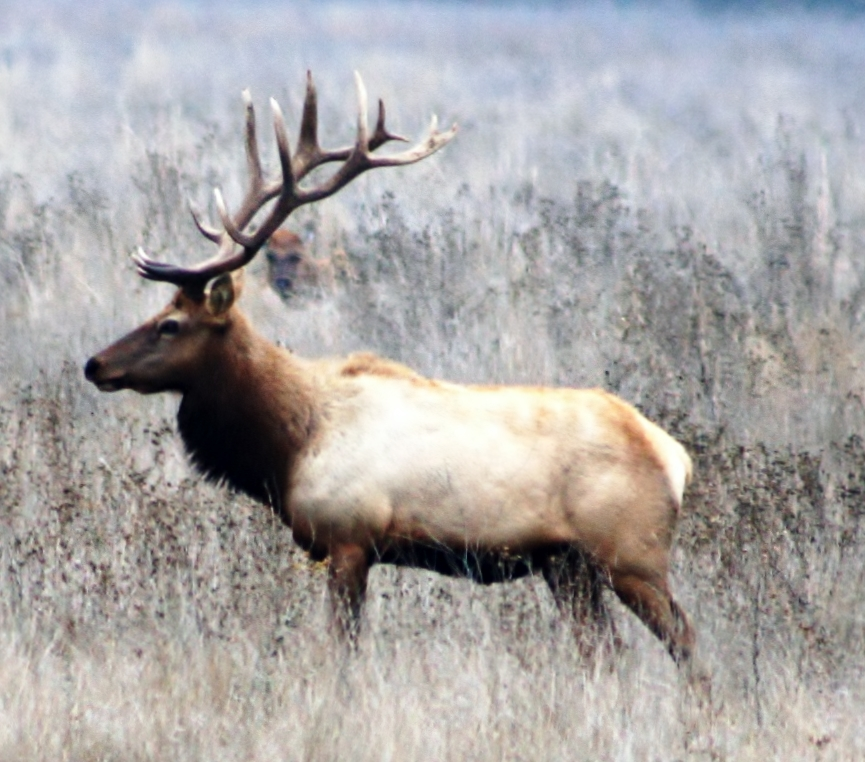
Tule elk roam the Diablo Range and are often seen on Coyote Ridge

== Ecology and conservation ==
Several rare species can be seen on Mount Hamilton. The Mount Hamilton jewelflower (Streptanthus callistus) is endemic to the area. In June 2011, five juvenile California condors flew over Mt. Hamilton and landed on the Lick Observatory, the species' first sighting in the area in at least 30 years.

In 1978, California Department of Fish and Game warden Henry Coletto urged the department to choose the Mount Hamilton area as one of California's relocation sites under a new statewide effort to restore tule elk (Cervus canadensis ssp. nannodes).

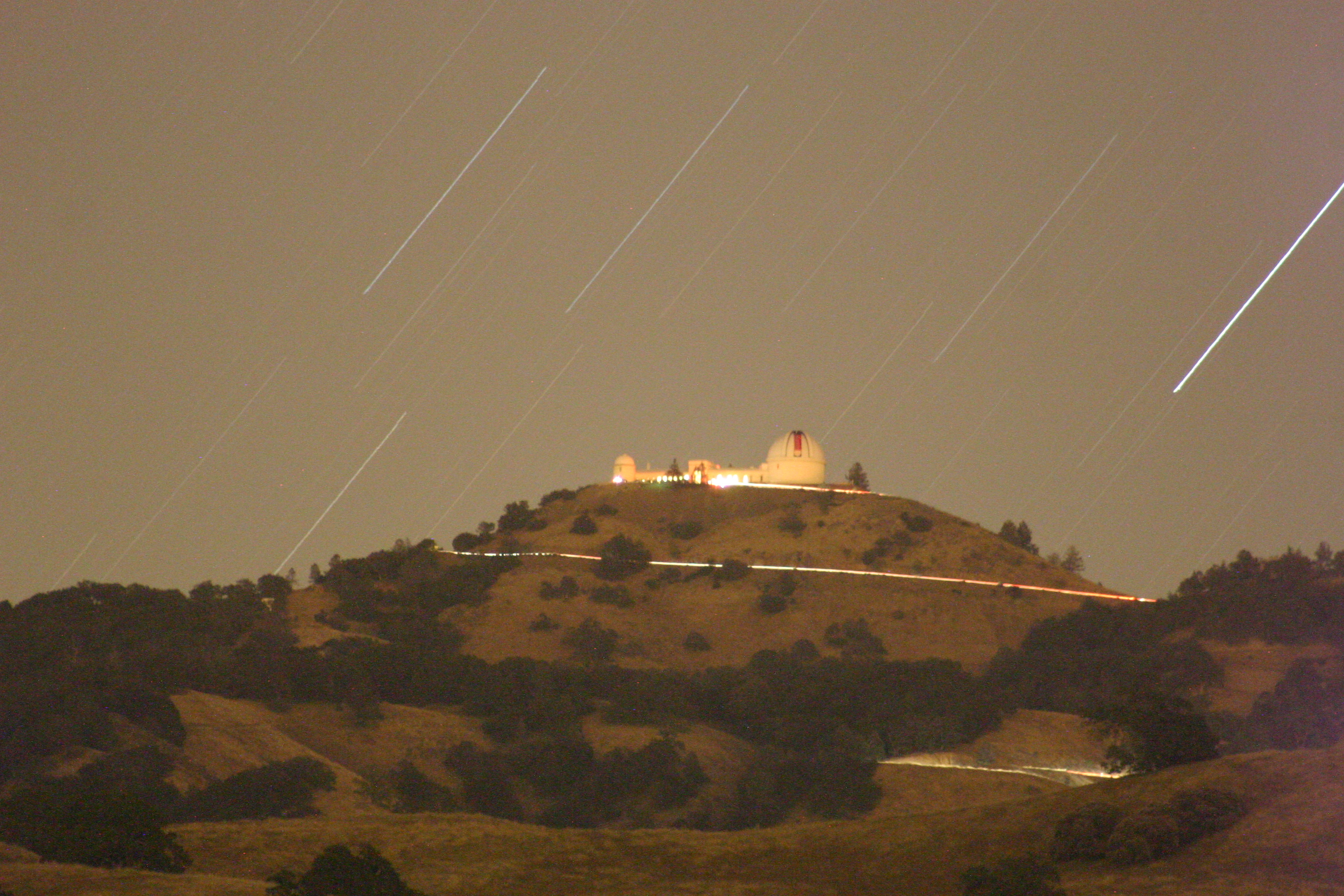
Lick Observatory on Mount Hamilton at night. Timed exposure taken from Grant Ranch Park.

The Nature Conservancy "Mount Hamilton Project" has acquired or put under conservation easement 100,000 acres (400 km^{2}) of land towards its 500,000 acres (2,000 km^{2}) goal for habitat conservation within a 1,200,000 acres (4,900 km^{2}) area encompassing much of eastern Santa Clara County.

== The community ==
Mount Hamilton has its own zip code, 95140. It is generally open space with a population in 2000 of 35. Mount Hamilton Elementary was a small one classroom school that closed in 2006.

== See also ==
- List of summits of the San Francisco Bay Area
- Grant Ranch Park
