= William Henry Brewer =

American botanist (1828–1910)

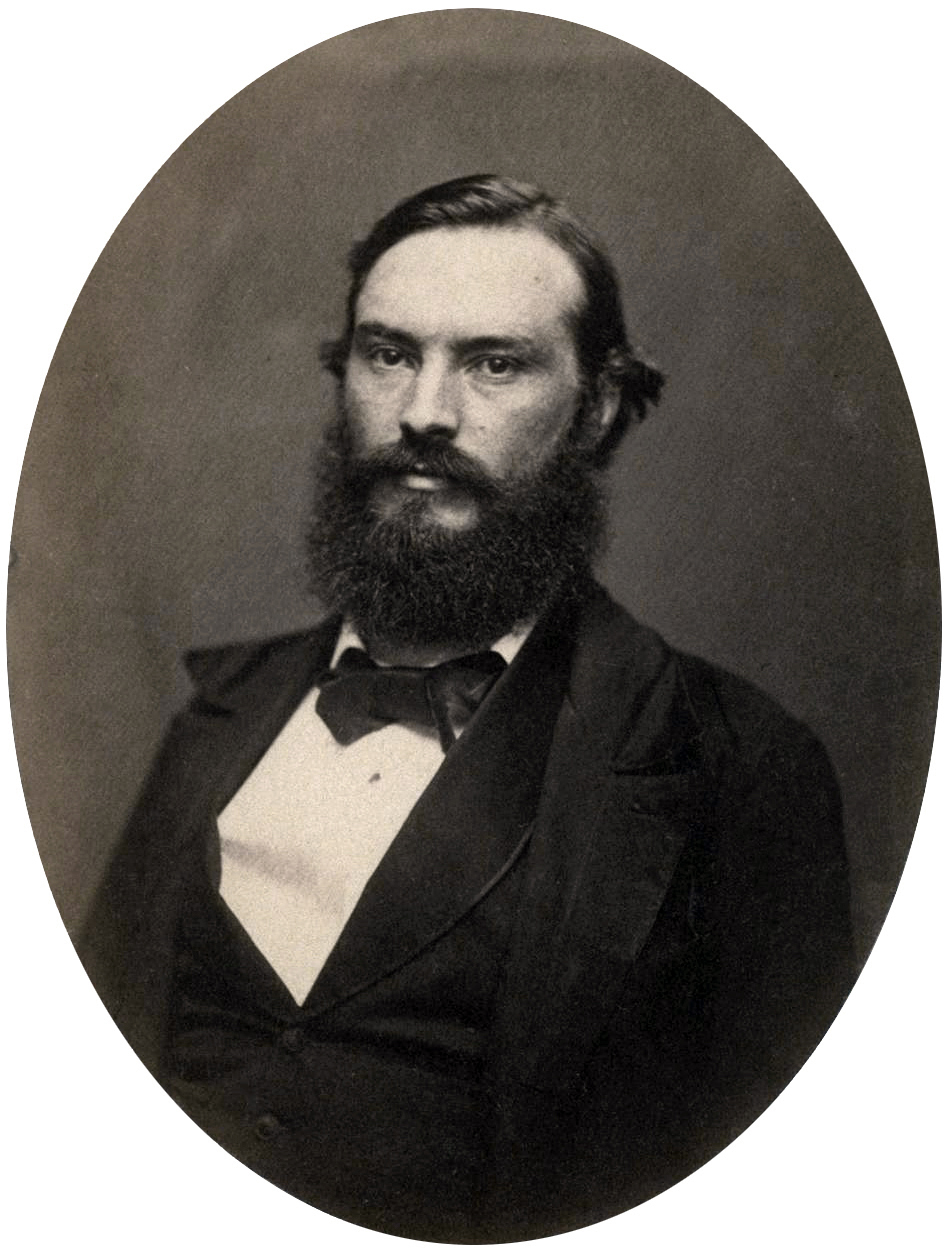
- Born: September 14, 1829; Poughkeepsie, New York, U.S.
- Died: November 2, 1910 (aged 81); New Haven, Connecticut, U.S.
- Education: Yale School of Engineering & Applied Science
- Scientific career
- Fields: Botany
- Workplaces: Washington & Jefferson College; Yale University

William Henry Brewer (September 14, 1828 – November 2, 1910) was an American botanist. He worked on the first California Geological Survey and was the first Chair of Agriculture at Yale University's Sheffield Scientific School.

== Biography ==
William H. Brewer was born in Poughkeepsie, New York and grew up on a farm in Enfield, New York. In 1848 Brewer attended Yale and began studying soil chemistry under Professors Benjamin Silliman and John Pitkin Norton. There, Brewer was a founding member of Berzelius, one of Yale's oldest "secret societies". In 1852 he graduated from the first class of the Sheffield Scientific School with a Bachelor of Philosophy degree and began teaching at the Ovid Academy in Ovid, New York. It was in Ovid where Brewer first befriended Presbyterian minister Laurentine Hamilton.

In 1855 Brewer travelled to Europe where he studied natural science under Professor Robert Bunsen at the University of Heidelberg in Germany. He then went to Munich to study organic chemistry under Professor Justus von Liebig. In 1857 Brewer went to Paris, France, and studied chemistry under Professor Michel Eugène Chevreul. In 1858 Brewer returned to the United States and married Angelina Jameson, of Ovid, New York on August 14, 1858. In October, he was appointed professor of chemistry at Washington and Jefferson College in Washington, Pennsylvania. His wife later died in June, 1859.

In 1860, shortly after the death of his wife and newborn son, Brewer was invited by Josiah D. Whitney to become the chief botanist of the California Division of Mines and Geology (predecessor of today's California Geological Survey). Brewer led field parties in the extensive survey of the geology of California until 1864, when he became the Chair of Agriculture at Sheffield Scientific School. Brewer wrote extensively during the survey including many letters to family and friends, a compendium of which was eventually published by the Yale University Press in 1930 as Up and Down California in 1860-1864.

On September 1, 1868, he married his second wife, Georgiana Robinson, of Exeter, New Hampshire. Together they had four children, three sons and one daughter. During his tenure at Yale, Brewer took part in a survey of Greenland in 1869. In 1899 he was hired by Edward Henry Harriman to take part in his famous Alaskan expedition. In 1903 Brewer retired from teaching, and died at his New Haven, Connecticut home in 1910. He was buried at Grove Street Cemetery. He was a member of the Connecticut Academy of Arts and Sciences and of the National Academy of Sciences.

Mount Brewer, located in the Sierra Nevada mountain range, is named after him, as is the very rare spruce Picea breweriana, Brewer Spruce, endemic to the Klamath Mountains of southwest Oregon and northwest California.
