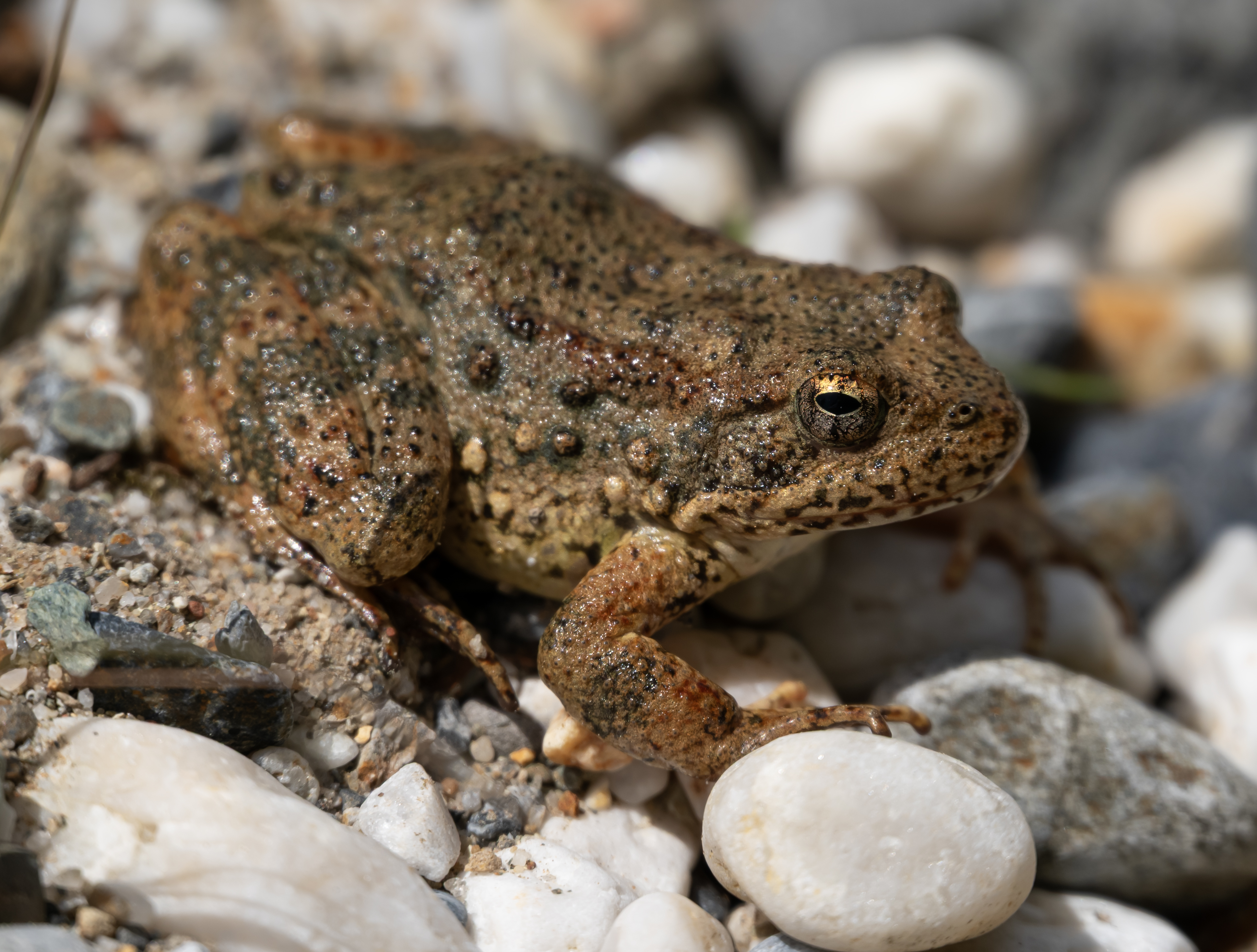

Conservation status
- Near Threatened (IUCN 3.1)

Scientific classification
- Kingdom: Animalia
- Phylum: Chordata
- Class: Amphibia
- Order: Anura
- Family: Ranidae
- Genus: Rana
- Species: R. boylii

Binomial name
- Rana boylii Baird, 1854

= Foothill yellow-legged frog =

Species of amphibian

The foothill yellow-legged frog (Rana boylii) is a small-sized (3.72–8.2 cm or 1.46–3.23 in) frog from the genus Rana in the family Ranidae. This species was historically found in the Coast Ranges from northern Oregon, through California, and into Baja California, Mexico as well as in the foothills of the Sierra Nevada and southern Cascade Range in California. The foothill yellow-legged frog is a Federal Species of Concern and California State Endangered. A federal rule to list four out of six extant distinct population segments (DPS) under the Endangered Species Act was proposed in December 2021.

== Appearance ==
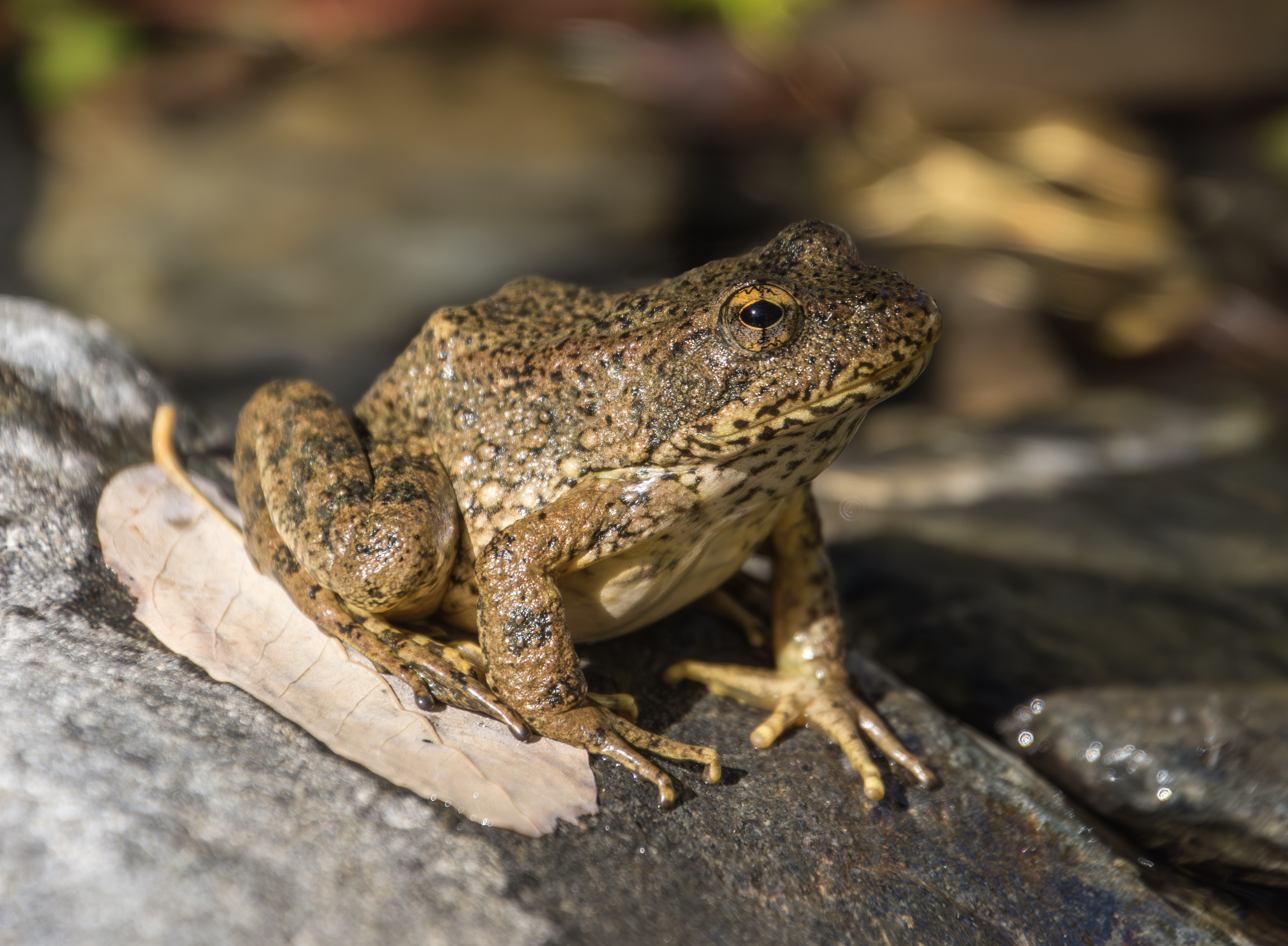
An adult Rana boylii from the western slope Sierra Nevada foothills, California, USA.

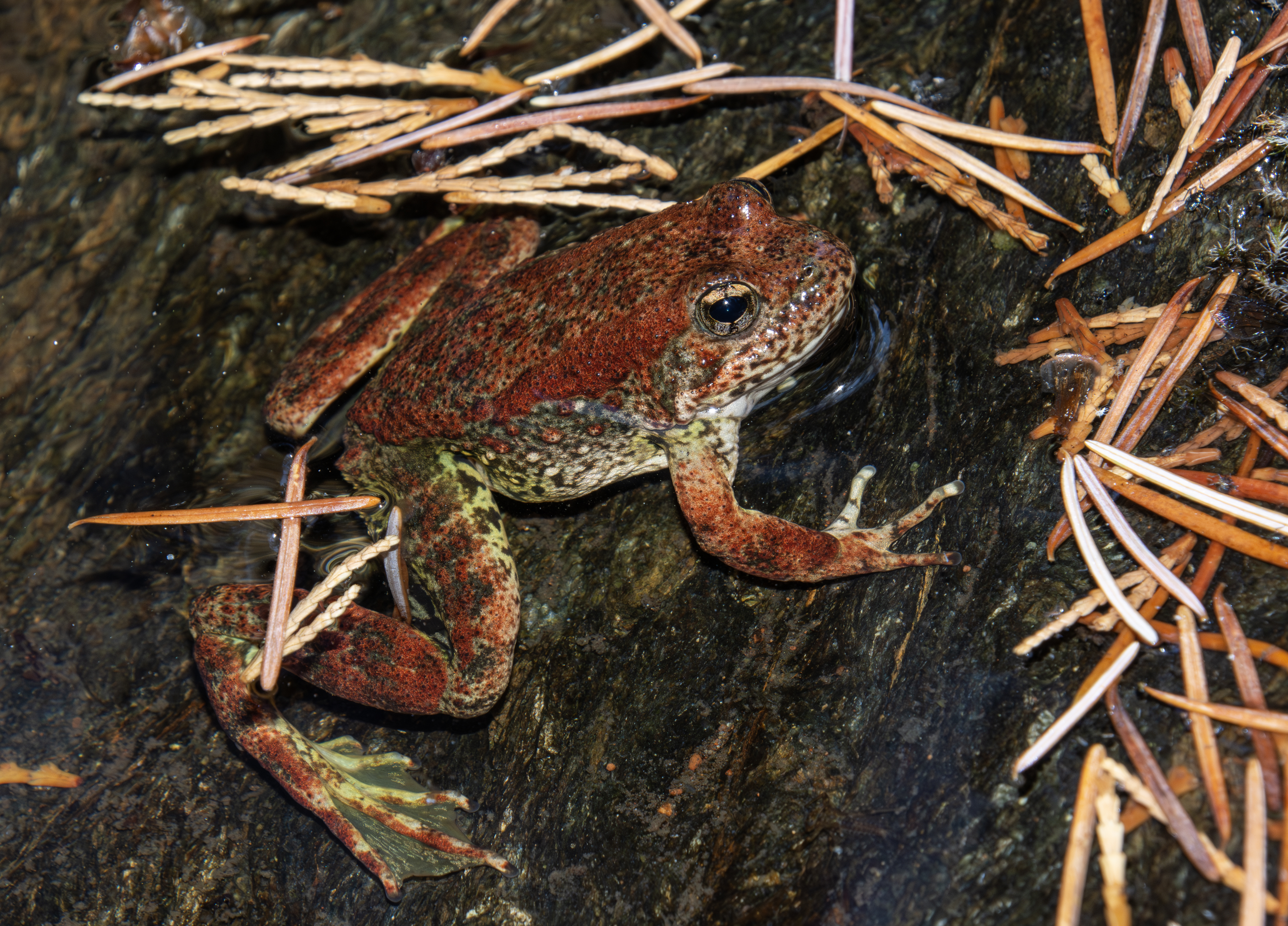
Rana boylii with a reddish dorsal coloration.

The foothill yellow-legged frog has a grey, brown, or reddish dorsum, or the back of the frog. It is commonly spotted or mottled, but occasionally is plainly colored. Adults have yellow coloration under their legs, which may extend to their abdomens, but this characteristic is faint or absent in young frogs.

A triangular, buff-colored patch occurs on the snout, and, unlike other frogs in the genus, there is no eye stripe. The throat and chest are often boldly mottled; and the species has indistinct dorsolateral skin folds and granular skin. Males of this species develop nuptial pads on their thumb bases during the breeding season. These frogs can be identified by their rough skin, horizontal pupils, fully webbed hind feet, and their habit of jumping into moving water.

Tadpoles of this species, though, resemble those of the western toad, Bufo boreas. R. boylii as tadpoles have fairly flattened tails that lack color at the end and are the tallest in the midsection. The mouths of the tadpoles are made for suction to rocks, with labial teeth rows used for scraping algae and diatoms, unicellular algae with cells walls that contain silica, off of the rocks to which they are clinging. The mouth of the young R. boylii is also helpful in identifying it from B. boreas because the young foothill yellow-legged frogs develop more defined teeth rows after three weeks, while their counterparts do not.

Both the Columbia spotted frog and the Cascades frog, also part of the genus Rana, live in the northern regions of this frog's territory.

== Food sources ==
Food supplies, such as algae the tadpoles eat, also affect the sexual maturity of the species. Reportedly, the "amount of protein in different algae, can affect size at and time to metamorphosis" and "these food effects may be mediated through diet-induced changes in thyroid function", which means the food the tadpoles ingest dictates the changes in the thyroid gland's production of certain proteins. Tadpoles most commonly feed on algae, diatoms, and detritus. As the species grows older, it changes its diet to animal tissue which must be swallowed whole because the frog's jaw is structured on a hinge joint that does not allow for sideways movement as in humans. Adult frogs eat a range of foods such as moths, ants, grasshoppers, hornets, beetles, flies, water striders, and snails.

== Mating habits ==
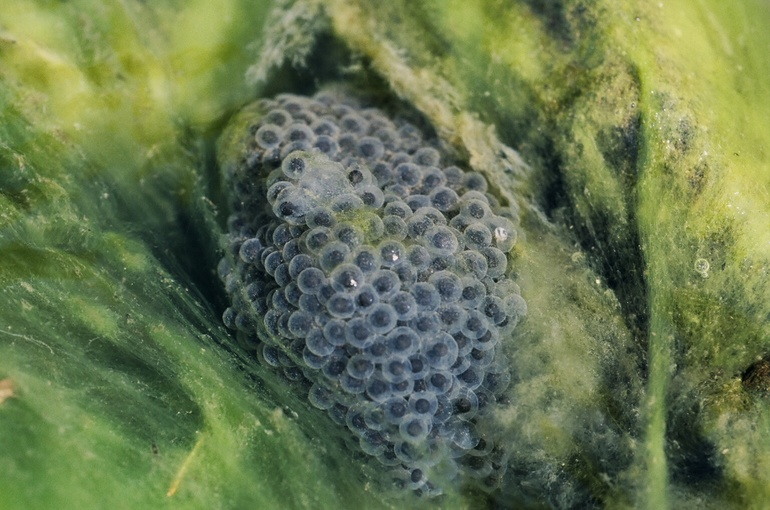
This egg mass is placed between two large rocks.

The mating "ceremonies" begin in spring, when adult frogs congregate on sandy and/or rocky bars to mate. Previously believed to mate from March to May, recent experiments have shown the time to be closer to April to late June. High stream velocities, however, may dislodge R. boylii egg masses from oviposition substrates. Thus, R. boylii avoids rapid waters to protect the egg masses from being swept away. This technique is why the species has a long breeding season. If the conditions do not meet their standards, they refuse to mate and wait until the water velocities go back down to ideal.

For the foothill yellow-legged frog, oviposition, or the depositing of eggs, is somewhat sporadic because delays such as rains could cause problems such as unwanted removal of eggs. The males also perform mating calls mostly underwater, and those above the water are faint and hard to hear over 50 m. After the frogs have successfully mated, the egg masses are laid about 0.5 m attached to rocks underwater in streams and rivers with flow velocities ranging from 0.1 to 0.6 m^{3}/second.

These egg masses can contain 100 to 1000 eggs in one batch, contained in a bluish gel that disappears once the eggs take on water, and the dark ovum, the center of egg, is covered by three jelly envelopes about 5.4 mm in diameter. Eggs hatch in about five to over thirty days depending on the temperature that the mass is at and the surrounding water. The tadpoles continue to stay associated with the egg mass for several days, and continue to need higher temperatures to grow quickly. By the time the tadpoles reach about 40 mm, roughly 1.5 in, they are adults and their reproductive organs are mostly functional. The frogs are usually fully developed by the summer after their first metamorphosis, though some begin breeding after six months.

== Range and habitat ==
Foothill yellow-legged frogs occur in the Coast Ranges from the Santiam River in Marion County, Oregon south to the San Gabriel River in Los Angeles County and along the west slopes of the Sierra/Cascade mountain ranges in most of central and northern California. Other isolated populations have been reported in the Baja California Norte, in southern California, and at Sutter Buttes in Butte County, California. The species is found at elevations ranging from sea level to 6,700 feet (2,000 m) in Baja California Norte. In California, foothill yellow-legged frog have been recorded in the Sierra as high as 6,000 feet (1,800 m) near McKesick Peak, Plumas National Forest and 6,365 feet (1,940 m) at Snow Mountain at the boundary of Lake and Colusa Counties. They are found in flowing streams and rivers with either rocky substrate or sunny banks.

== Chemical defense ==
R. boylii uses a chemical defense to protect itself from fungal infections, such as the Batrachochytrium dendrobatidis. The frog secretes a peptide through the skin and the hydrophobic (water repellent) sections of the peptide access to fungi that want to attach to the amphibian. This ability can also be found in other Rana species, including the Cascades frog and the moor frog. The former secretes a milky substance that fights against fungal infections and the latter uses its capability to have males turn blue during mating season. Still, the foothill yellow-legged frog's chemical defense has not been fully examined. Although not much is known about it, this ability of the species has been of interest to many companies because of its overall antifungal effectiveness. However, current pesticide use has caused problems for the frog. Exposure to carbaryl, a substance found in common pesticides, has been shown to not kill the frogs but does lower the peptides' abilities to defend the species against invaders like the chytrid, B. dendrobatidis. More research is being done to see the full effects pesticides may have on R. boylii.

== Environmental issues ==
Along with the problems associated with pesticides being washed into this frog's habitat, in Trinity County, California, a dam on the major river of the frog's home has affected about 94% of the possible procreation areas for the frogs, which has endangered the population. One study suggests the "data from a comparably sized undammed river fork in the same system ... demonstrated that both the number of potential sites and the total number of egg masses were…higher on this fork than in our main stem", so the unseasonal flooding required by the dam was negatively affecting the mating behavior of the frog.

The temperature of the water in Trinity County is also lower than it was before the dam was put into place. To keep up with demands of fisheries, the water's temperature is kept artificially lower than normal, which consequently slows the development of R. boylii. Therefore, the colder temperatures are making it more difficult for the frogs to grow quickly, which sometimes leaves the species prey to many other animals that feed on their young. The problems occurring between the foothill yellow-legged frog and the dam are being handled by several herpetological organizations, along with the Forest Service, to find ways to alter the effects in a beneficial way for the frog. This species is also estimated to be gone from most of its range in the Sierra Nevada, especially south of Highway 80, where pesticides often contaminate rivers, and dams block the essential stream flows.

== Predators ==
The foothill yellow-legged frog is a natural prey of diving beetles, water bugs, garter snakes, rough-skinned newts, bullfrogs, and western toads.
