= Calaveras =

Calavera (Spanish for skull) or its plural calaveras, may refer to:

== Culture ==
- Calaveras, any of various skull-shaped things associated with the Dia de Los Muertos
- Literary Calavera, traditional Mexican composition in verse

== Places ==
- Calaveras River, in the Central Valley of California, USA
- Calaveras Creek (California), USA
- Calaveras County, California, USA
- Rancho Calaveras, California, USA
- Calaveras Dome, California, USA; a granite dome
- Cerro de la Calavera (English: Mount Calavera), Carlsbad, California, USA
- Calaveras Unified School District, Calaveras County, California, USA
- Calaveras Fault, a geological fault in the San Francisco Bay Area, California, USA
- Calaveras Valley, California, USA
- La Calavera Historical Neighborhood, Smeltertown, Texas, USA
- Calaveras, Texas, USA; a small town near San Antonio
- Calaveras Creek, Texas, USA
- Calaveras Lake (Texas), USA
- Isla Calavera, an island in the Gulf of California

=== Facilities and structures ===
- Calaveras Power Station, San Antonio, Texas, USA
- Calaveras Reservoir, California, USA
- Calaveras County Airport, Calaveras County, California, USA
- Calaveras station, BART, Silicon Valley, California, USA

== People ==
- Jordi Calavera (born 1995) Spanish soccer player
- Calavera II, a former ring name for pro-wrestler luchador Jesús Javier Hernández Silva (1971–1993) a.k.a. Oro (wrestler)

=== Fictional characters ===
- Calaveras, a member of the Black Moon Clan, the primary villains in the Sailor Moon R manga and anime series
- Calaveras, the subordinates of the Arrancar Rudobone in the Bleach manga and anime series
- Francisca Calavera, titular character of the comic Calavera (comics)
- Manuel Calavera, the protagonist in the LucasArts 1998 adventure game, Grim Fandango
- Maria Calvera, a character from RWBY
- Robi Calavera, titular character of the animated series The Swashbuckling Adventures of Capitán Calavera

== Other uses ==
- El Calavera (film), 1954 Argentinian film
- Calavera (album), a 2001 album by 'Fiskales Ad-Hok'
- Calavera (comics), an adult comic featuring a female assassin with razor claws named Francisca Calavera
- Trío Calaveras, a Mexican musical trio

== See also ==
- Siro calaveras (S. calaveras) a species of mite harvestman
- "The Celebrated Jumping Frog of Calaveras County", a short story by Mark Twain

The Jumping Frog of Calaveras County, opera by Lukas Foss based on the short story by Mark Twain

- Calavera Hills School, Carlsbad, California, USA
- Calaveras Hills High School, Milpitas, California, USA
- Calaveras Skull, a human skull discovered in Calaveras County
- Calaverite
- Calaveras Big Trees (disambiguation)
- Calaveras Lake (disambiguation)
- Skull (disambiguation)
