= Big Tree =

Big Tree may refer to:

== Trees ==
- Tree § Superlative trees, for big trees in general
- Big Tree (Washington tree), a Ponderosa pine tree that formerly stood in Washington State, U.S.
- Big Tree at Victoria Falls, a large baobab near Victoria Falls in Zimbabwe
- The Big Tree, 400 year old national champion in Missouri, U.S.
- The Big Tree, Rockport, a live oak near Rockport, Texas, U.S.
- Big Tree, the tallest tree known to the public in northern California's Redwoods
- The Senator (tree), the oldest pond cypress tree in the United States
- The Big Tree, Kirkwall, a sycamore tree in Orkney, Scotland
- Landmark in Glen Osmond, South Australia

== People ==
- Big Tree (Kiowa leader) (1847–1927), Kiowa war leader
- Chief John Big Tree (1877–1967), Seneca Nation chief

== Places in the United States ==
- Big Trees, California
- Big Tree Station, Mariposa, California
- Big Tree Station, a former name of Wawona, California
- Big Tree, New York

== Other uses ==
- Big Tree (Buff novel), a children's novel written and illustrated by Mary and Conrad Buff
- Big Tree (Selznick novel), a children's fantasy fiction book written and illustrated by Brian Selznick
- The Big Trees, a 1952 film
- Big Trees Lodge, a hotel in Yosemite, California, U.S.
- Big Tree Records, a record label
- Treaty of Big Tree, a late 18th century Indian treaty between the Six Nations and United States

== See also ==
- Big Banyan Tree, in Kethohalli, Karnataka, India
- Calaveras Big Trees (disambiguation)
