= Skull (comics) =

Skull in comics may refer to:

- Skull the Slayer, a Marvel Comics character
- Skull Comics, an underground comic published by Last Gasp Funnies

== See also ==
- Red Skull, a Marvel Comics character
- Skull (disambiguation)
