= Cranium (disambiguation) =

The cranium (plural crania) is a part of the skull.

Crania or cranium may also refer to:

== Art, entertainment, and media ==
=== Games ===
- Cranium (board game), a board game, or its extensions or spin-offs
- Cranium, Inc., the board game company that makes Cranium

=== Music ===
- Cranium (band), a Swedish speed metal band

=== Film ===
- Cranium Entertainment, an American film production company

== Biology ==
- Crania (brachiopod), a genus of brachiopods

== Places ==
Any one of a number of places in Greece, known in modern transliteration as Kranea or more traditionally as Crania (Greek: Κρανέα):

- Kranea (disambiguation)

== See also ==
- Skull (disambiguation)
