= Skull (disambiguation) =

The skull is the bony structure in the head of a craniate.

Skull or Skulls may also refer to:

== Places ==
- Skull Lake, British Columbia, Canada
- Skull Creek (disambiguation)
- 2015 TB145, a celestial object that passed Earth in 2015, known as the "Skull Asteroid"
- Schull, County Cork, Ireland

== People ==
- Skull (singer), Korean reggae singer
- Brian "The Skull" Murphy (1933–2023), Australian police detective
- Edward Francis "Skull" Murphy (1926–1989), bouncer, criminal, and professional wrestler
- Skull Murphy (1930–1970), professional wrestler
- Nevio Skull (1903–1945), Italian businessman and politician
- "Skull", nickname of Kerry O'Keeffe (born 1949), Australian former cricketer
- Harris Brothers, an American professional wrestling duo, also known as Skull and 8-Ball

== Arts and entertainment ==
=== Fictional characters and organizations ===
- Eugene "Skull" Skullovitch, one of duo Bulk and Skull, in the Power Rangers universe
- Skull, a character in the 1983 film Scarface
- Skull the Slayer, a Marvel Comics character
- Skull, the codename for Ryuji Sakamoto, a character from Persona 5

=== Films ===
- Khopdi: The Skull, a 1999 Indian horror film
- The Skull (film), a 1965 British horror film directed by Freddie Francis
- Skull: The Mask, a 2020 Brazilian-American horror film
- The Skulls (film), a 2000 American psychological thriller
- The Skulls II, a 2002 American psychological thriller
- The Skulls III, a 2004 American psychological thriller

=== Music ===
- Skull (music), a percussion instrument
- The Skull (band), a heavy metal band
- The Skulls (American band), a punk rock band from Los Angeles
- The Skulls (Canadian band), a punk rock band from Vancouver
- The Skull (album), a 1985 album by Trouble
- "Skull" (song), a song by Sebadoh from the 1994 album Bakesale
- "Skulls" (Misfits song), a song by the Misfits from the 1982 album Walk Among Us
- "Skulls", a song by Bastille from the 2013 album All This Bad Blood
- "Skulls", a song by Halestorm from the 2018 album Vicious

=== Short stories ===
- "The Skull" (short story), a short story by Philip K. Dick

== Other uses ==
- Skulls, members of the international college fraternity Phi Kappa Sigma
- Skulls Unlimited International, a commercial supplier of osteological specimens located in Oklahoma City, Oklahoma
- Skull (card game), 2011 bluffing card game
- Skul: The Hero Slayer, a 2021 video game

== See also ==
- Calaveras (disambiguation), Spanish equivalent of the word
- Cranium (disambiguation)
- Crystal skull (disambiguation)
- Schull, County Cork, Ireland
- Scull (disambiguation), a homophone, often referring to scull, a type of boat
- Skull Valley (Utah)
- Skull and crossbones (disambiguation)
