= Geography of Brazil =

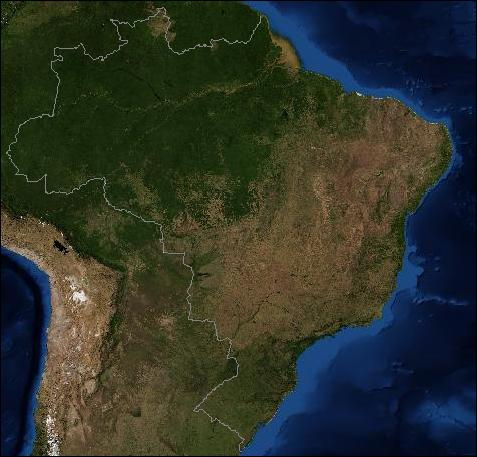
- Continent: South America
- Coordinates: 10°S 55°W
- Area: Ranked 5th
  - Total: 8,514,877 km^{2} (3,287,612 sq mi)
  - Land: 99.34%
  - Water: 0.66%
- Coastline: 7,491 km (4,655 mi)
- Borders: Argentina 1,263 km (785 mi); Bolivia 3,403 km (2,115 mi); Colombia 1,790 km (1,110 mi); French Guiana 649 km (403 mi); Guyana 1,308 km (813 mi); Paraguay 1,371 km (852 mi); Peru 2,659 km (1,652 mi); Suriname 515 km (320 mi); Uruguay 1,050 km (650 mi); Venezuela 2,137 km (1,328 mi)
- Highest point: Pico da Neblina; 2,995.30 m (9,827 ft)
- Lowest point: Atlantic Ocean, 0 m (0 ft)
- Longest river: Amazon River, 6,992 km (4,345 mi)
- Largest lake: Lagoa dos Patos; 9,850 km^{2} (3,803 sq mi)
- Climate: North: tropical, South: temperate
- Terrain: Coastal mountain ranges, vast central plateau (Planalto Central), remainder is primarily sedimentary basins
- Natural resources: bauxite, gold, iron ore, manganese, nickel, phosphates, platinum, tin, clay, rare earth elements, uranium, petroleum, hydropower, and timber
- Natural hazards: recurring droughts in northeast; floods and occasional frost in south
- Environmental issues: deforestation in the Amazon basin, illegal wildlife trade, illegal poaching, air and water pollution, land degradation and water pollution caused by mining activities, wetland degradation and severe oil spills
- Exclusive economic zone: 3,830,955 km^{2} (1,479,140 mi^{2})

The country of Brazil occupies roughly half of South America, bordering the Atlantic Ocean. Brazil covers a total area of 8,514,215 km^{2} (3,287,357 sq mi) which includes 8,456,510 km^{2} (3,265,080 sq mi) of land and 55,455 km^{2} (21,411 sq mi) of water. The highest point in Brazil is Pico da Neblina at 2,994 m (9,823 ft). Brazil is bordered by the countries of Argentina, Bolivia, Colombia, Guyana, Paraguay, Peru, Suriname, Uruguay, Venezuela, and French Guiana.

Much of the climate is tropical, with the south being relatively temperate. The largest river in Brazil, and the second longest in the world, is the Amazon.

== Size and geographical location ==
Brazil occupies most of the eastern part of the South American continent and its geographic heartland and various islands in the Atlantic Ocean. The only countries in the world that are larger are Russia, Canada, China and the United States. The national territory extends 4,397.53 kilometers (2,732 mi) from north to south (5°16'10" N to 33°45'03" S latitude), and 4,320.53 kilometers (2,685 mi) from east to west (34°47'35" W to 73°58'59" W longitude). It spans four time zones, the westernmost of which is equivalent to Eastern Standard Time in the United States. The time zone of the capital (Brasília) and of the most populated part of Brazil along the east coast (UTC-3) is two hours ahead of Eastern Standard Time. The Atlantic islands are in the easternmost time zone.

Brazil possesses the archipelago of Fernando de Noronha, located 350 kilometers (217 mi) northeast of its "horn", and several small islands and atolls in the Atlantic - Abrolhos, Atol das Rocas, Penedos de São Pedro e São Paulo, Trindade, and Martim Vaz. In the early 1970s, Brazil claimed a territorial sea extending 362 kilometers (225 mi) from the country's shores, including those of the islands.

On Brazil's east coast, the Atlantic coastline extends 7,367 kilometers (4,578 mi). In the west, in clockwise order from the south, Brazil has 15,719 kilometers (9,767 mi) of borders with Uruguay, Argentina, Paraguay, Bolivia, Peru, Colombia, Venezuela, Guyana, Suriname, and French Guiana (overseas department of France). The only South American countries with which Brazil does not share borders are Chile and Ecuador. A few short sections are in question, but there are no true major boundary controversies with any of the neighboring countries. Brazil has the 10th largest Exclusive Economic Zone of 3,830,955 km^{2} (1,479,140 mi^{2}).

Brazil's 49 major ecosystems include the Amazon Basin, Pantanal, Cerrado, Caatinga, Atlantic Forest, and Pampas, each contributing uniquely to the country's rich biodiversity and environmental diversity. In Brazil forest cover is around 59% of the total land area, equivalent to 496,619,600 hectares (ha) of forest in 2020, down from 588,898,000 hectares (ha) in 1990. In 2020, naturally regenerating forest covered 485,396,000 hectares (ha) and planted forest covered 11,223,600 hectares (ha). Of the naturally regenerating forest 44% was reported to be primary forest (consisting of native tree species with clearly visible indications of human activity) and around 30% of the forest area was found within protected areas. For the year 2015, 56% of the forest area was reported to be under public ownership and 44% private ownership.

== Geology, geomorphology and drainage ==
In contrast to the Andes, which rose to elevations of nearly 7,000 meters (22,966 ft) in a relatively recent epoch and inverted the Amazon's direction of flow from westward to eastward, Brazil's geological formation is ancient. Precambrian crystalline shields cover 36% of the territory, especially its central area. The dramatic granite sugarloaf mountains in the city of Rio de Janeiro are an example of the terrain of the Brazilian shield regions, where continental basement rock has been sculpted into towering domes and columns by tens of millions of years of erosion, untouched by mountain-building events.

The principal mountain ranges average elevations under 2,000 meters (6,562 ft). The Serra do Mar Range hugs the Atlantic coast, and the Serra do Espinhaço Range, the largest in area, extends through the south-central part of the country. The highest mountains are in the Tumucumaque, Pacaraima, and Imeri ranges, among others, which traverse the northern border with the Guianas and Venezuela.

In addition to mountain ranges (about 0.5% of the country is above 1,200 m or 3,937 ft), Brazil's Central Highlands include a vast central plateau (Planalto Central). The plateau's uneven terrain has an average elevation of 1,000 meters (3,281 ft). The rest of the territory is made up primarily of sedimentary basins, the largest of which is drained by the Amazon and its tributaries. Of the total territory, 41% averages less than 200 meters (656 ft) in elevation. The coastal zone is noted for thousands of kilometers of tropical beaches interspersed with mangroves, lagoons, and dunes, as well as numerous coral reefs. A recent global remote sensing analysis also suggested that there were 5,389 km^{2} of tidal flats in Brazil, making it the 7th ranked country in terms of how much tidal flat occurs there.

The Parcel de Manuel Luís Marine State Park off the coast of Maranhão protects the largest coral reef in South America.

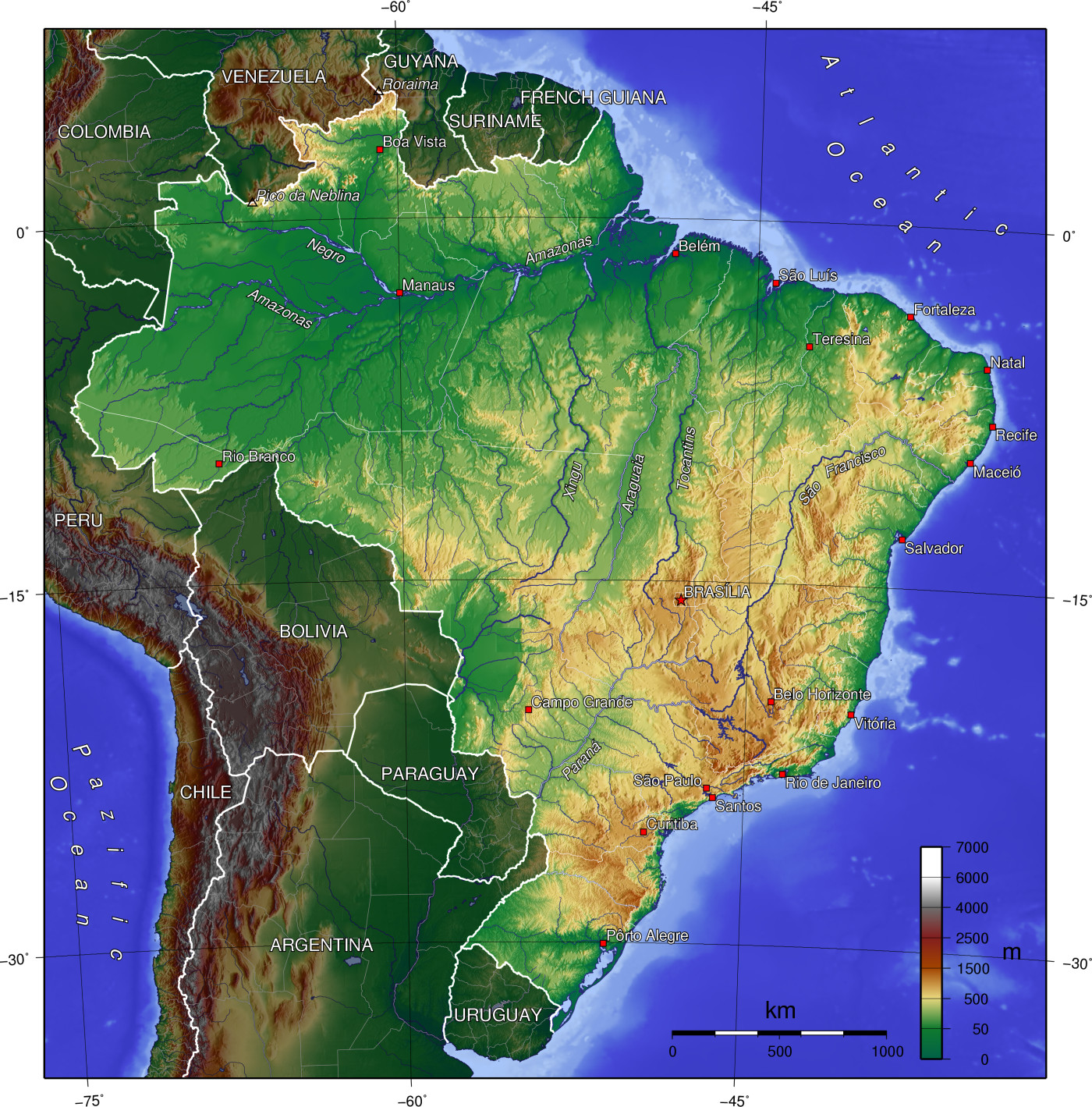
Topographic map of Brazil

Brazil has one of the world's most extensive river systems, with eight major drainage basins, all of which drain into the Atlantic Ocean. Two of these basins—the Amazon and Tocantins-Araguaia account for more than half the total drainage area. The largest river system in Brazil is the Amazon, which originates in the Andes and receives tributaries from a basin that covers 45.7% of the country, principally the north and west. The main Amazon river system is the Amazonas-Solimões-Ucayali axis (the 6,762-kilometer (4,202 mi)-long Ucayali is a Peruvian tributary), flowing from west to east. Through the Amazon Basin flows one-fifth of the world's fresh water. A total of 3,615 kilometers (2,246 mi) of the Amazon are in Brazilian territory. Over this distance, the waters decline only about 100 meters (330 ft). The major tributaries on the southern side are, from west to east, the Javari, Juruá, Purus (all three of which flow into the western section of the Amazon called the Solimões), Madeira, Tapajós, Xingu, and Tocantins. On the northern side, the largest tributaries are the Branco, Japurá, Jari, and Rio Negro. The above-mentioned tributaries carry more water than the Mississippi (its discharge is less than one-tenth that of the Amazon). The Amazon and some of its tributaries, called "white" rivers, bear rich sediments and hydrobiological elements. The black-white and clear rivers—such as the Negro, Tapajós, and Xingu—have clear (greenish) or dark water with few nutrients and little sediment.

The major river system in the Northeast is the Rio São Francisco, which flows 1,609 kilometers (1,000 mi) northeast from the south-central region. Its basin covers 7.6% of the national territory. Only 277 kilometers (172 mi) of the lower river are navigable for oceangoing ships. The Paraná system covers 14.5% of the country. The Paraná flows south among the Río de la Plata Basin, reaching the Atlantic between Argentina and Uruguay. The headwaters of the Paraguai, the Paraná's major eastern tributary, constitute the Pantanal, the largest contiguous wetlands in the world, covering as much as 230,000 square kilometers (89,000 sq mi).

Below their descent from the highlands, many of the tributaries of the Amazon are navigable. Upstream, they generally have rapids or waterfalls, and boats and barges also must face sandbars, trees, and other obstacles. Nevertheless, the Amazon is navigable by oceangoing vessels as far as 3,885 kilometers (2,414 mi) upstream, reaching Iquitos in Peru. The Amazon river system was the principal means of access until new roads became more important. Hydroelectric projects include Itaipu, in Paraná, with 12,600 MW; Tucuruí, in Pará, with 7,746 MW; and Paulo Afonso, in Bahia, with 3,986 MW.

=== Natural resources ===
Natural resources in Brazil include bauxite, gold, iron ore, manganese, nickel, phosphates, platinum, tin, clay, rare earth elements, uranium, petroleum, hydropower, and timber.

== Rivers and lakes ==
Main Hydrographic Regions of Brazil

According to organs of the Brazilian government there are 12 major hydrographic regions in Brazil. Seven of these are river basins named after their main rivers; the other five are groupings of various river basins in areas which have no dominant river.

- 7 hydrographic regions named after their dominant rivers:
  - Amazonas
  - Paraguai
  - Paraná
  - Parnaíba
  - São Francisco
  - Tocantins
  - Uruguay
- 5 coastal Hydrographic Regions based on regional groupings of minor river basins (listed from north to south):
  - Atlântico Nordeste Ocidental (Western North-east Atlantic)
  - Atlântico Nordeste Oriental (Eastern North-east Atlantic)
  - Atlântico Leste (Eastern Atlantic)
  - Atlântico Sudeste (South-east Atlantic)
  - Atlântico Sul (South Atlantic)

The Amazon River is the widest and second longest river (behind the Nile) in the world. This huge river drains the greater part of the world's rainforests. Another major river, the Paraná, has its source in Brazil. It forms the border of Paraguay and Argentina, then winds its way through Argentina and into the Atlantic Ocean, along the southern coast of Uruguay.

== Soil and vegetation ==
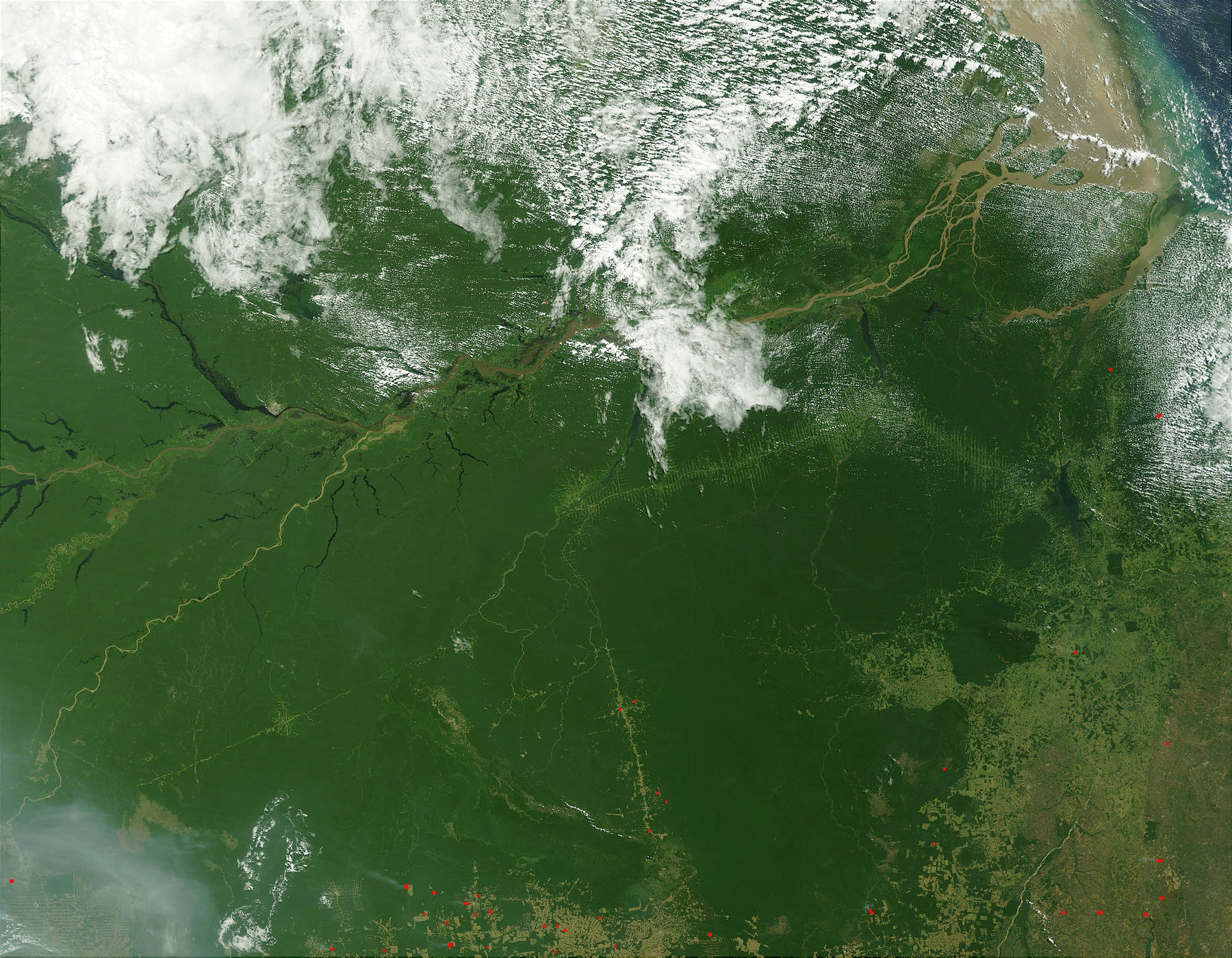
The Amazon Rainforest

Brazil's tropical soils produce almost 210 million tons of grain crops per year, from about 70 million hectares of crops. The country also has the 5th largest arable land area in the world. Burning also is used traditionally to remove tall, dry, and nutrient-poor grass from pasture at the end of the dry season. Until mechanization and the use of chemical and genetic inputs increased during the agricultural intensification period of the 1970s and 1980s, coffee planting and farming, in general, moved constantly onward to new lands in the west and north. This pattern of horizontal or extensive expansion maintained low levels of technology and productivity and placed emphasis on quantity rather than the quality of agricultural production.

The largest areas of fertile soils, called terra roxa (red earth), are found in the states of Paraná and São Paulo. The least fertile areas are in the Amazon, where the dense rainforest is. Soils in the Northeast are often fertile, but they lack water, unless they are irrigated artificially.

In the 1980s, investments made possible the use of irrigation, especially in the Northeast Region and in Rio Grande do Sul State, which had shifted from grazing to soy and rice production in the 1970s. Savanna soils also were made usable for soybean farming through acidity correction, fertilization, plant breeding, and in some cases spray irrigation. As agriculture underwent modernization in the 1970s and 1980s, soil fertility became less important for agricultural production than factors related to capital investment, such as infrastructure, mechanization, use of chemical inputs, breeding, and proximity to markets. Consequently, the vigor of frontier expansion weakened.

The variety of climates, soils, and drainage conditions in Brazil is reflected in the range of its vegetation types. The Amazon Basin and the areas of heavy rainfall along the Atlantic coast have tropical rain forest composed of broadleaf evergreen trees. The rain forest may contain as many as 3,000 species of flora and fauna within a 2.6-square-kilometer (1 sq mi) area. The Atlantic Forest is reputed to have even greater biological diversity than the Amazon rain forest, which, despite apparent homogeneity, contains many types of vegetation, from high canopy forest to bamboo groves.

In the semiarid Northeast, caatinga, a dry, thick, thorny vegetation, predominates. Most of central Brazil is covered with a woodland savanna, known as the cerrado (sparse scrub trees and drought-resistant grasses), which became an area of agricultural development after the mid-1970s. In the South (Sul), needle-leaved pinewoods (Paraná pine or araucaria) cover the highlands; grassland similar to the Argentine pampa covers the sea-level plains. The Mato Grosso swamplands (Pantanal Mato-grossense) is a Florida-sized plain in the western portion of the Center-West (Centro-Oeste). It is covered with tall grasses, bushes, and widely dispersed trees similar to those of the cerrado and is partly submerged during the rainy season.

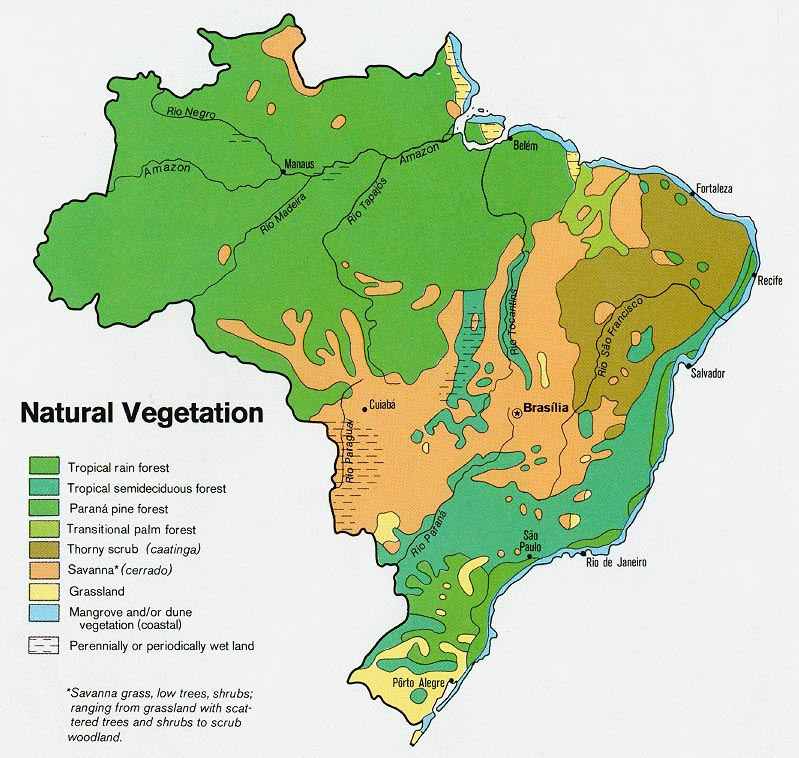
Natural vegetation map of Brazil, 1977. The "Paraná pine" (Araucaria angustifolia) is a conifer but not a pine, pines are not native to the Southern Hemisphere.

Brazil, which is named after reddish dyewood (pau brasil), has long been famous for the wealth of its tropical forests. These are not, however, as important to world markets as those of Asia and Africa, which started to reach depletion only in the 1980s. By 1996 more than 90% of the original Atlantic forest had been cleared, primarily for agriculture, with little use made of the wood, except for araucaria pine in Paraná.

The inverse situation existed with regard to clearing for wood in the Amazon rain forest, of which about 15% had been cleared by 1994, and part of the remainder had been disturbed by selective logging. Because the Amazon forest is highly heterogeneous, with hundreds of woody species per hectare, there is considerable distance between individual trees of economic value, such as mahogany and Pereira. Therefore, this type of forest is not normally cleared for timber extraction but logged through high-grading or selection of the most valuable trees. Because of vines, felling, and transportation, their removal causes destruction of many other trees, and the litter and new growth create a risk of forest fires, which are otherwise rare in rainforests. In favorable locations, such as Paragominas, in the northeastern part of Pará State, a new pattern of timber extraction has emerged: diversification and the production of plywood have led to the economic use of more than 100 tree species.

Starting in the late 1980s, rapid deforestation and extensive burning in Brazil received considerable international and national attention. Satellite images have helped document and quantify deforestation as well as fires, but their use also has generated considerable controversy because of problems of defining original vegetation, cloud cover, and dealing with secondary growth and because fires, as mentioned above, may occur in old pasture rather than signifying new clearing. Public policies intended to promote sustainable management of timber extraction, as well as sustainable use of nontimber forest products (such as rubber, Brazil nuts, fruits, seeds, oils, and vines), were being discussed intensely in the mid-1990s. However, implementing the principles of sustainable development, without irreversible damage to the environment, proved to be more challenging than establishing international agreements about them.

== Climate ==
Brazil map of Köppen climate classification zones

Although 74% of the country is within the tropical zone, the climate of Brazil varies considerably from the mostly tropical North (the equator traverses the mouth of the Amazon) to temperate zones below the Tropic of Capricorn (23°27' S latitude), which crosses the country at the latitude of the city of São Paulo. Brazil has five climatic regions: equatorial, tropical, semiarid, highland tropical, subtropical and oceanic.

Temperatures along the equator are high, averaging above 25 °C (77 °F), but not reaching the summer extremes of up to 40 °C (104 °F) in the temperate zones. There is little seasonal variation near the equator, although at times it can get cool enough for wearing a jacket, especially in the rain. At the country's other extreme, there are frosts south of the Tropic of Capricorn during the winter (June–August), and there is snow in the mountainous areas, such as Paraná, Rio Grande do Sul and Santa Catarina. Temperatures in the cities of Belo Horizonte and Brasília are moderate (usually between 15 and 30 °C or 59 and 86 °F), despite their relatively low latitude, because of their elevation of approximately 1,000 meters (3,281 ft). Rio de Janeiro, Recife, and Salvador on the coast have warm climates, with average temperatures ranging from 23 to 27 °C (73.4 to 80.6 °F), but enjoy constant trade winds. The southern cities of Porto Alegre and Curitiba have a subtropical climate similar to that in parts of the United States and Europe, and temperatures can fall below freezing in winter.

Precipitation levels vary widely. Most of Brazil has moderate rainfall of between 1,000 and 1,500 millimetres (39.4 and 59.1 in) a year, with most of the rain falling in the winter (between December and April) south of the Equator. The Amazon region is notoriously humid, with rainfall generally more than 2,000 millimetres (78.7 in) per year and reaching as high as 3,000 millimetres (118.1 in) in parts of the western Amazon and near Belém. It is less widely known that, despite high annual precipitation, the Amazon rain forest has a three- to five-month dry season, the timing of which varies according to location north or south of the equator.

High and relatively regular levels of precipitation in the Amazon contrast sharply with the dryness of the semiarid Northeast, where rainfall is scarce and there are severe droughts in cycles averaging seven years. The Northeast is the driest part of the country. The region also constitutes the hottest part of Brazil, where during the dry season between May and November, temperatures of more than 38 °C (100 °F) have been recorded. However, the sertão, a region of semidesert vegetation used primarily for low-density ranching, turns green when there is rain. Most of the Center-West has 1,500 to 2,000 millimetres (59.1 to 78.7 in) of rain per year, with a pronounced dry season in the middle of the year, while the South and most of the year without a distinct dry season.

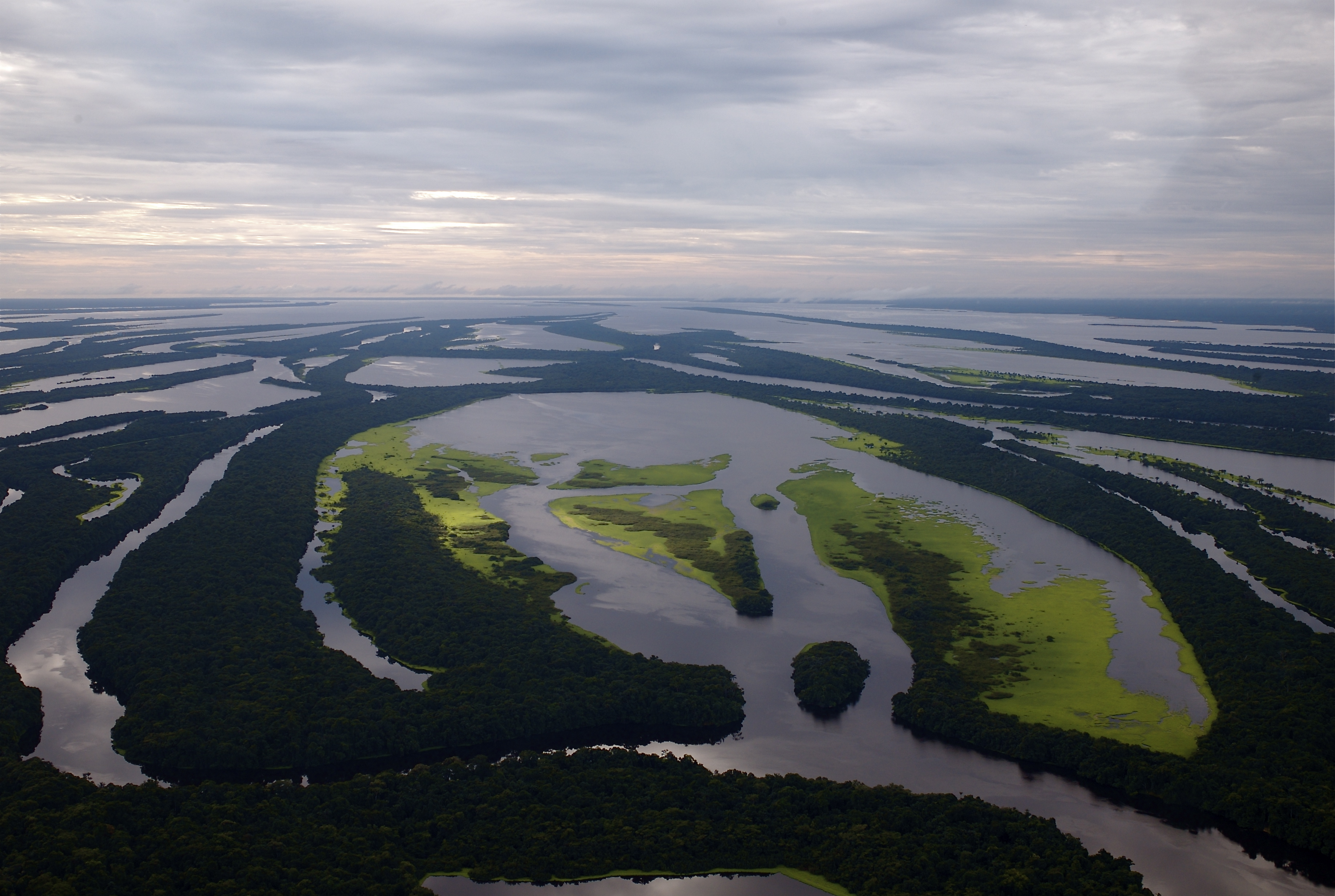
Tropical rainforest climate in Anavilhanas National Park, Amazonas.

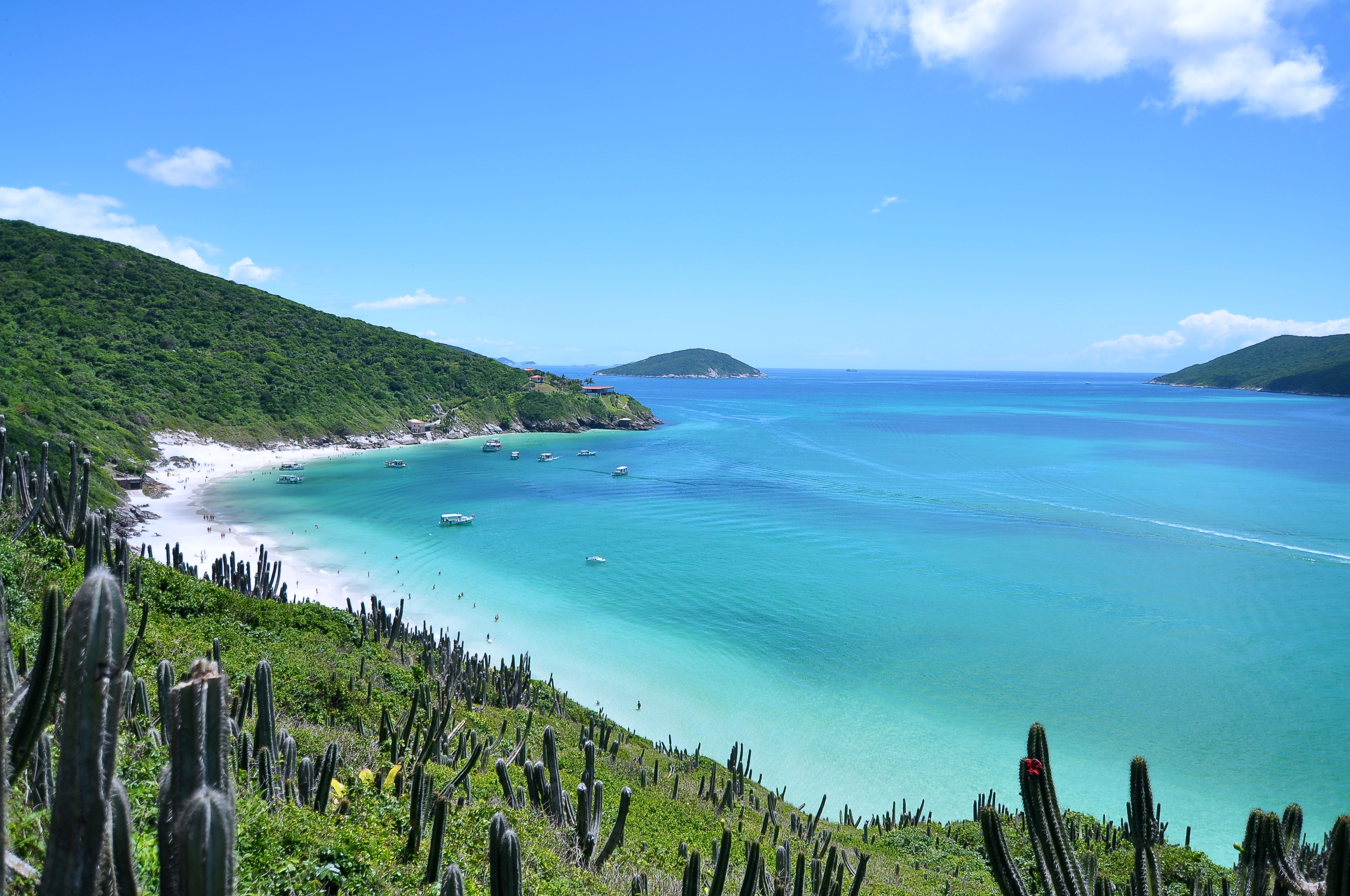
Tropical climate in the municipality of Arraial do Cabo, Rio de Janeiro.

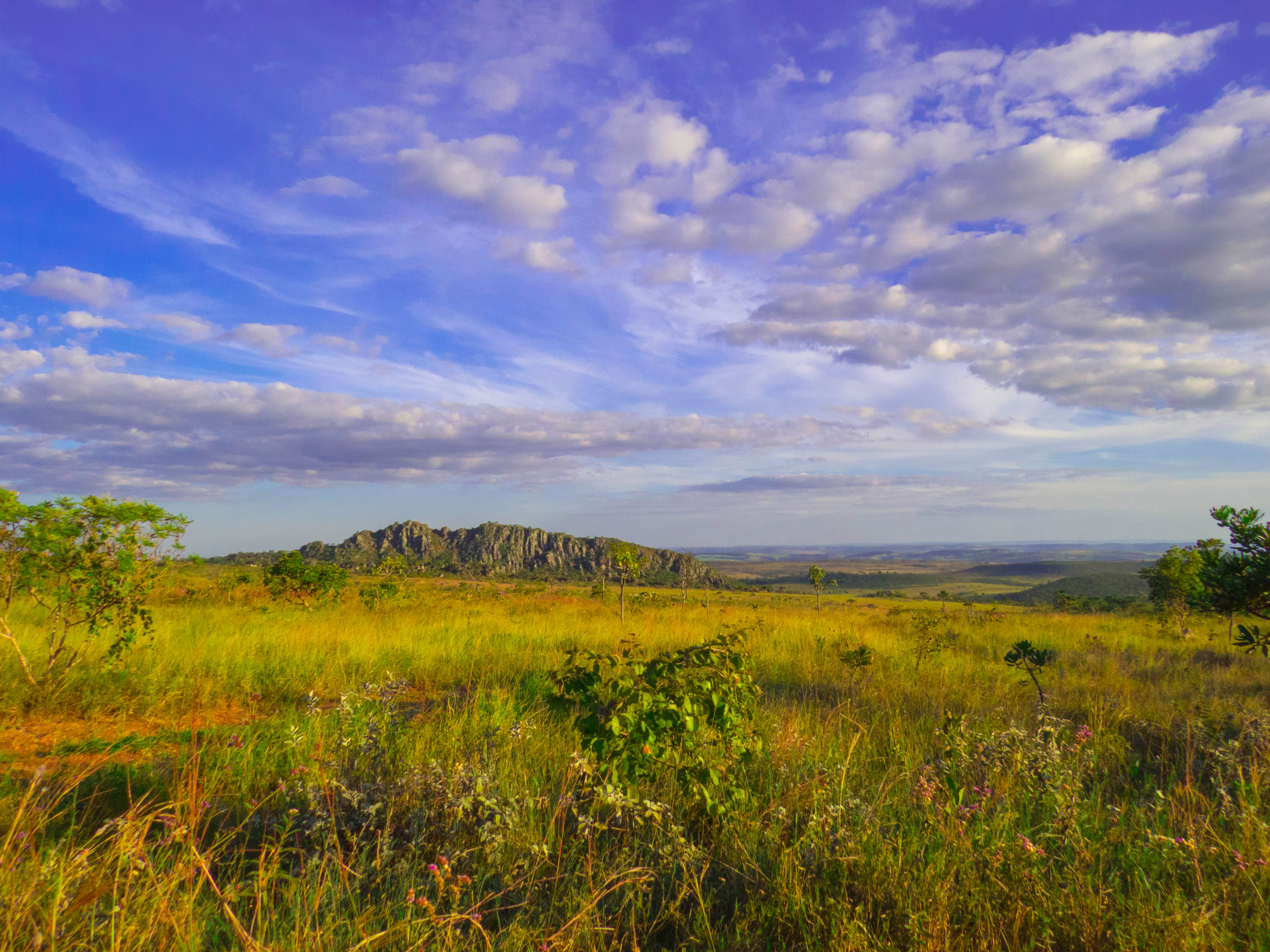
Savanna climate in the Cerrado, Pirineus State Park, Goiás.

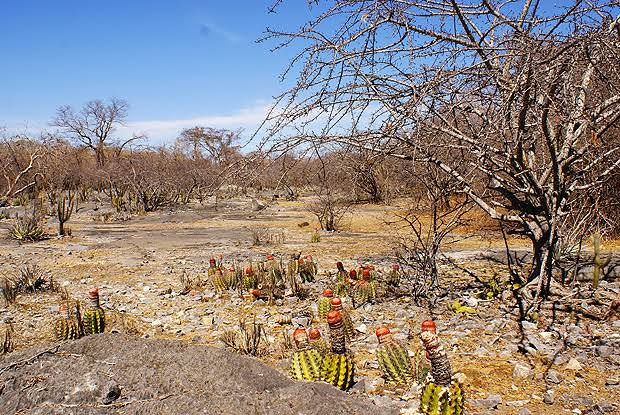
Hot semi-arid climate in the Caatinga, a biome that covers part of the Northeast Region of Brazil.

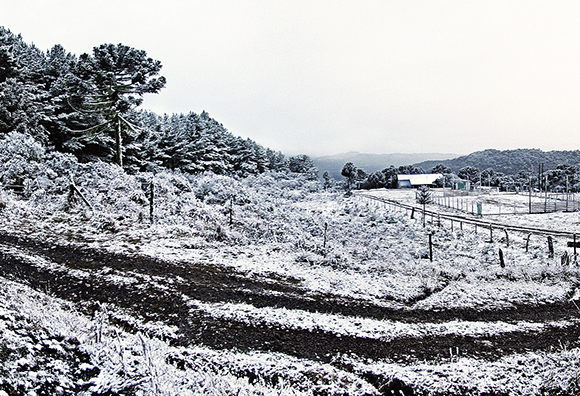
Snow in São Joaquim, Santa Catarina. The town has a temperate oceanic climate (Cfb).

== Geographic regions ==
Brazil's 26 states and the Federal District (Distrito Federal) are divided conventionally into five regions: North (Norte), Northeast (Nordeste), Southeast (Sudeste), South (Sul), and Center-West (Centro-Oeste). In 2015 there were 5,570 municipalities (municípios), which have municipal governments. Many municipalities, which are comparable to United States counties, are in turn divided into districts (distritos), which do not have political or administrative autonomy. In 2015 there were 10,424 districts. All municipal and district seats, regardless of size, are considered officially to be urban. For purely statistical purposes, the municipalities were grouped in 1990 into 558 micro-regions, which in turn constituted 137 meso-regions. This grouping modified the previous micro-regional division established in 1968, a division that was used to present census data for 1970, 1975, 1980, and 1985.

Each of the five major regions has a distinct ecosystem. Administrative boundaries do not necessarily coincide with ecological boundaries, however. In addition to differences in physical environment, patterns of economic activity and population settlement vary widely among the regions. The principal ecological characteristics of each of the five major regions, as well as their principal socioeconomic and demographic features, are summarized below.

Political map of Brazil, showing the division by states and regions.

=== Center-West ===
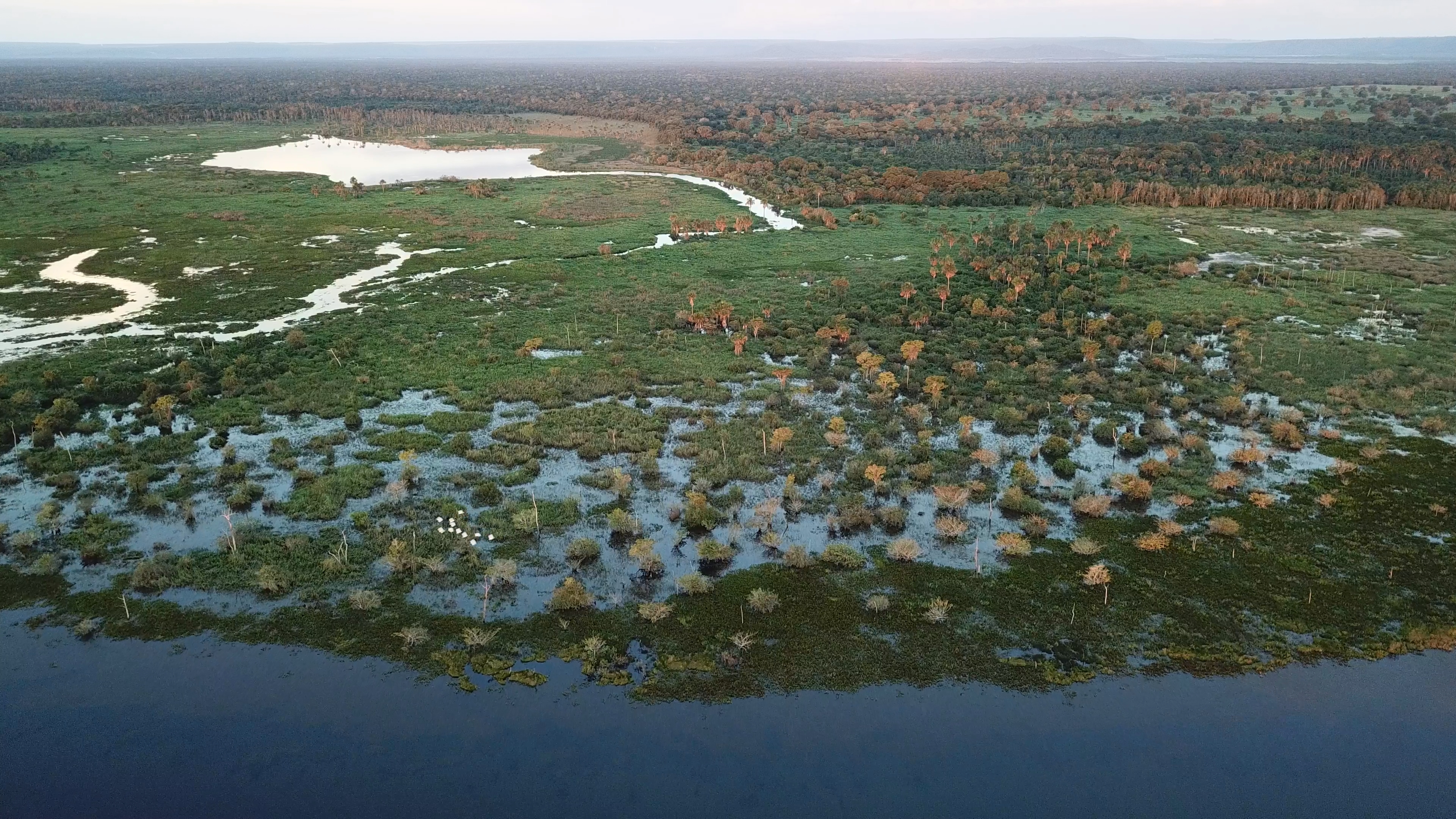
Pantanal wetland

The Center-West consists of the states of Goiás, Mato Grosso, Mato Grosso do Sul (separated from Mato Grosso in 1979) and the Federal District, where Brasília is located, the national capital. Until 1988 Goiás State included the area that then became the state of Tocantins in the North.

The Center-West has 1,612,077 square kilometers (622,426 sq mi) and covers 18.9% of the national territory. Its main biome is the cerrado, the tropical savanna in which natural grassland is partly covered with twisted shrubs and small trees. The cerrado was used for low-density cattle-raising in the past but is now also used for soybean production. There are gallery forests along the rivers and streams and some larger areas of forest, most of which have been cleared for farming and livestock. In the north, the cerrado blends into tropical forest. It also includes the Pantanal wetlands in the west, known for their wildlife, especially aquatic birds and caimans. In the early 1980s, 33.6% of the region had been altered by anthropic activities, with a low of 9.3% in Mato Grosso and a high of 72.9% in Goiás (not including Tocantins). In 1996 the Center-West region had 10.2 million inhabitants, or 6% of Brazil's total population. The average density is low, with concentrations in and around the cities of Brasília, Goiânia, Campo Grande, and Cuiabá. Living standards are below the national average. In 1994 they were highest in the Federal District, with per capita income of US$7,089 (the highest in the nation), and lowest in Mato Grosso, with US$2,268.

=== Northeast ===
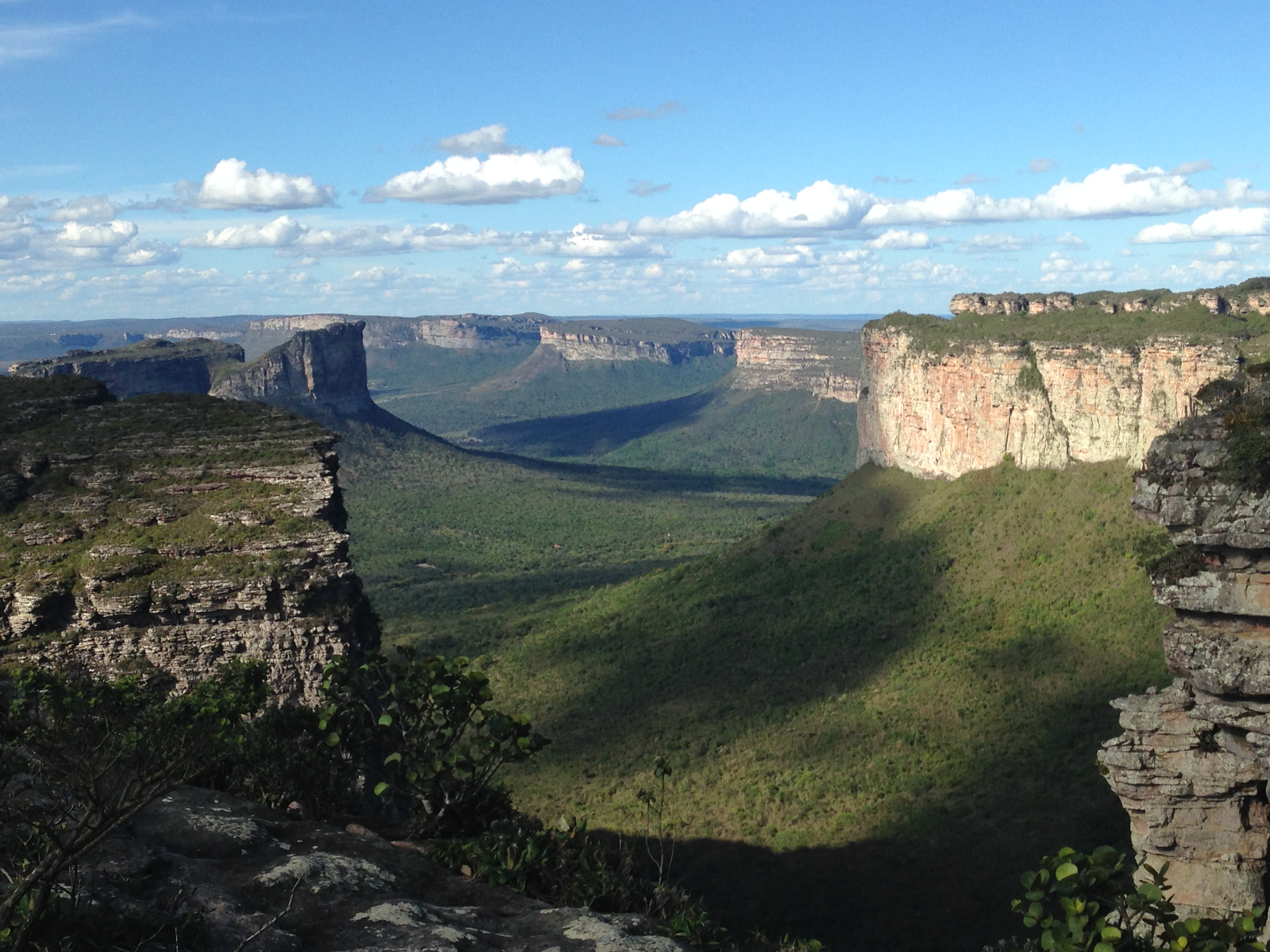
Chapada Diamantina region in Bahia

The nine states that make up the Northeast are Alagoas, Bahia, Ceará, Maranhão, Paraíba, Pernambuco, Piauí, Rio Grande do Norte, and Sergipe. The Fernando de Noronha archipelago (formerly the federal territory of Fernando de Noronha, now part of Pernambuco state) is also included in the Northeast.

The Northeast, with 1,561,178 square kilometers (602,774 sq mi), covers 18.3% of the national terrest concentration of rural population, and its living standards are the lowest in Brazil. In 1994 Piauí had the lowest per capita income in the region and the country, only US$835, while Sergipe had the highest average income in the region, with US$1,958.

=== North ===
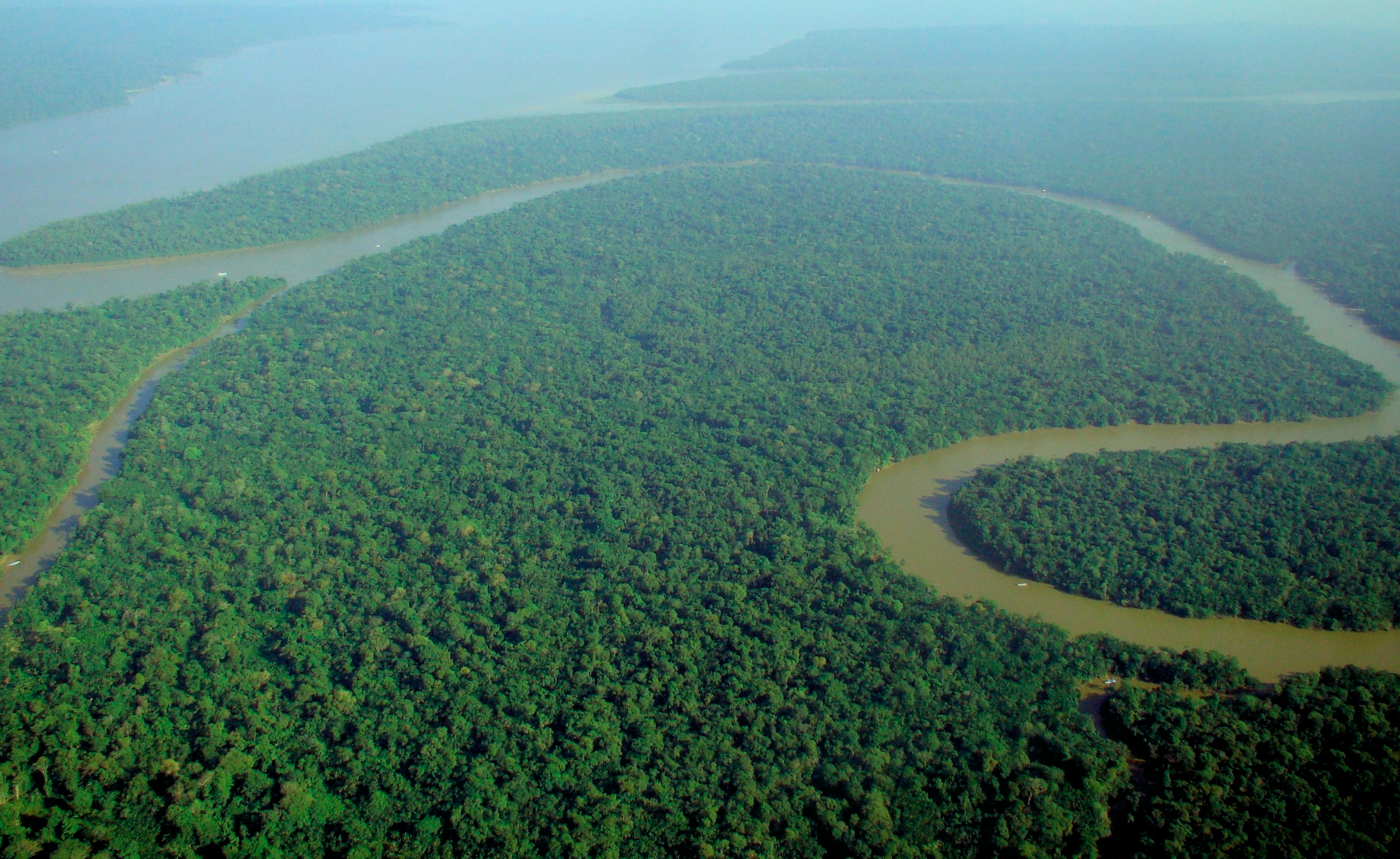
An area of the Amazon rainforest

The equatorial North, also known as the Amazon or Amazônia, includes, from west to east, the states of Rondônia, Acre, Amazonas, Roraima, Pará, Amapá, and, as of 1988, Tocantins (created from the northern part of Goiás State, which is situated in the Center-West). Rondônia, previously a federal territory, became a state in 1986. The former federal territories of Roraima and Amapá were raised to statehood in 1988.

With 3,869,638 square kilometers (1,494,076 sq mi), the North is the country's largest region, covering 45.3% of the national territory. The region's principal biome is the humid tropical forest, also known as the rain forest, home to some of the planet's richest biological diversity. The North has served as a source of forest products ranging from "backlands drugs" (such as sarsaparilla, cocoa, cinnamon, and turtle butter) in the colonial period to rubber and Brazil nuts in more recent times. In the mid-twentieth century, non-forest products from mining, farming, and livestock-raising became more important, and in the 1980s the lumber industry boomed. In 1990, 6.6% of the region's territory was considered altered by anthropic (man-made) action, with state levels varying from 0.9% in Amapá to 14.0% in Rondônia.

In 1996 the North had 11.1 million inhabitants, only 7% of the national total. However, its share of Brazil's total had grown rapidly in the 1970s and early 1980s as a result of interregional migration, as well as high rates of natural increase. The largest population concentrations are in eastern Pará State and in Rondônia. The major cities are Belém and Santarém in Pará, and Manaus in Amazonas. Living standards are below the national average. The highest per capita income, US$2,888, in the region in 1994, was in Amazonas, while the lowest, US$901, was in Tocantins.

=== Southeast ===
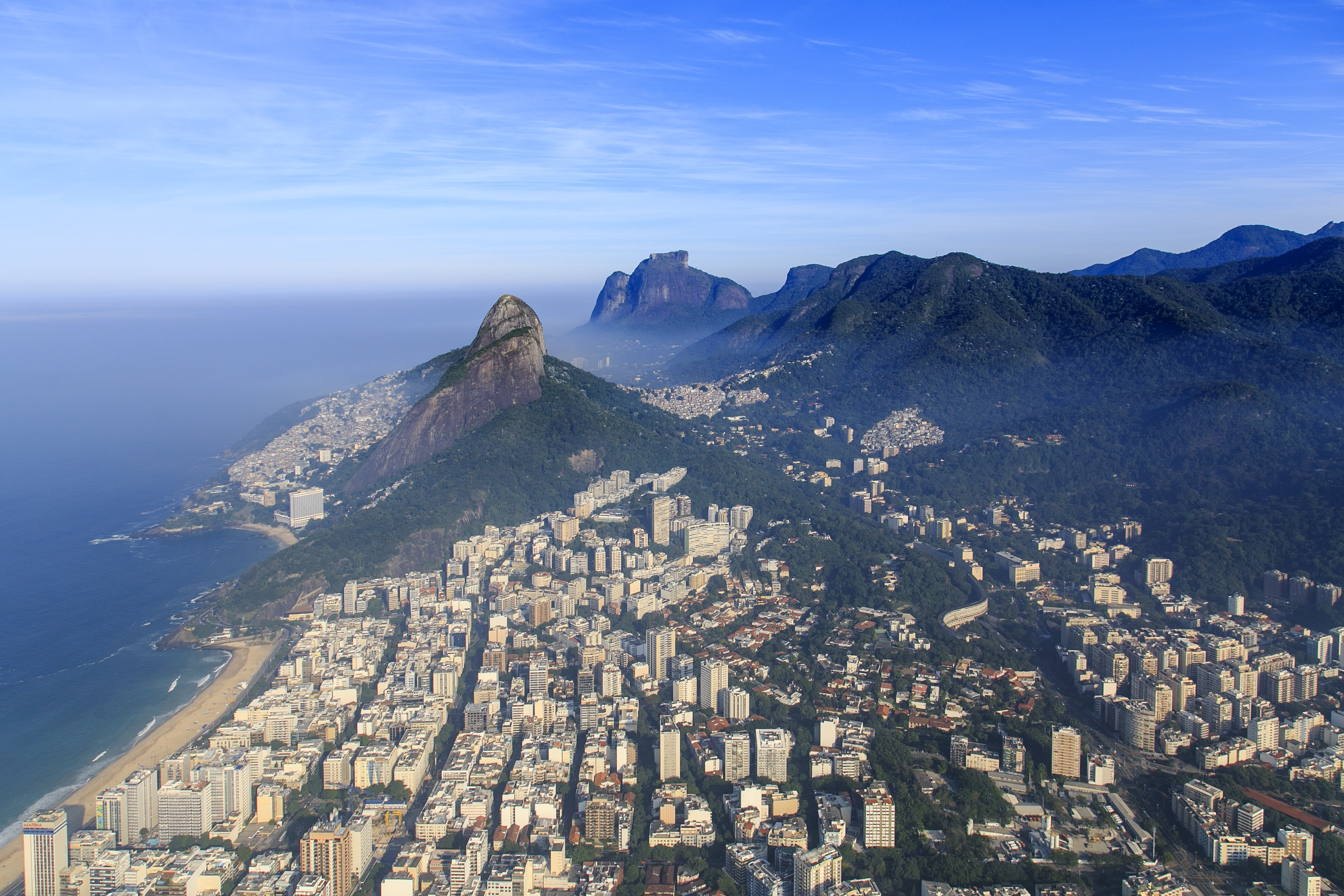
View of Rio de Janeiro

The Southeast consists of the four states of Espírito Santo, Minas Gerais, Rio de Janeiro, and São Paulo. Its total area of 927,286 square kilometers (358,027 sq mi) corresponds to 10.9% of the national territory. The region has the largest share of the country's population, 63 million in 1991, or 39% of the national total, primarily as a result of internal migration since the mid-19th century until the 1980s. In addition to a dense urban network, it contains the megacities of São Paulo and Rio de Janeiro, which in 1991 had 18.7 million and 11.7 million inhabitants in their metropolitan areas, respectively. The region combines the highest living standards in Brazil with pockets of urban poverty. In 1994 São Paulo boasted an average income of US$4,666, while Minas Gerais reported only US$2,833.

Originally, the principal biome in the Southeast was the Atlantic Forest, but by 1990 less than 10% of the original forest cover remained as a result of clearing for farming, ranching, and charcoal making. Anthropic activity had altered 79.7% of the region, ranging from 75% in Minas Gerais to 91.1% in Espírito Santo. The region has most of Brazil's industrial production. The state of São Paulo alone accounts for half of the country's industries. Agriculture, also very strong, has diversified and now uses modern technology.

=== South ===
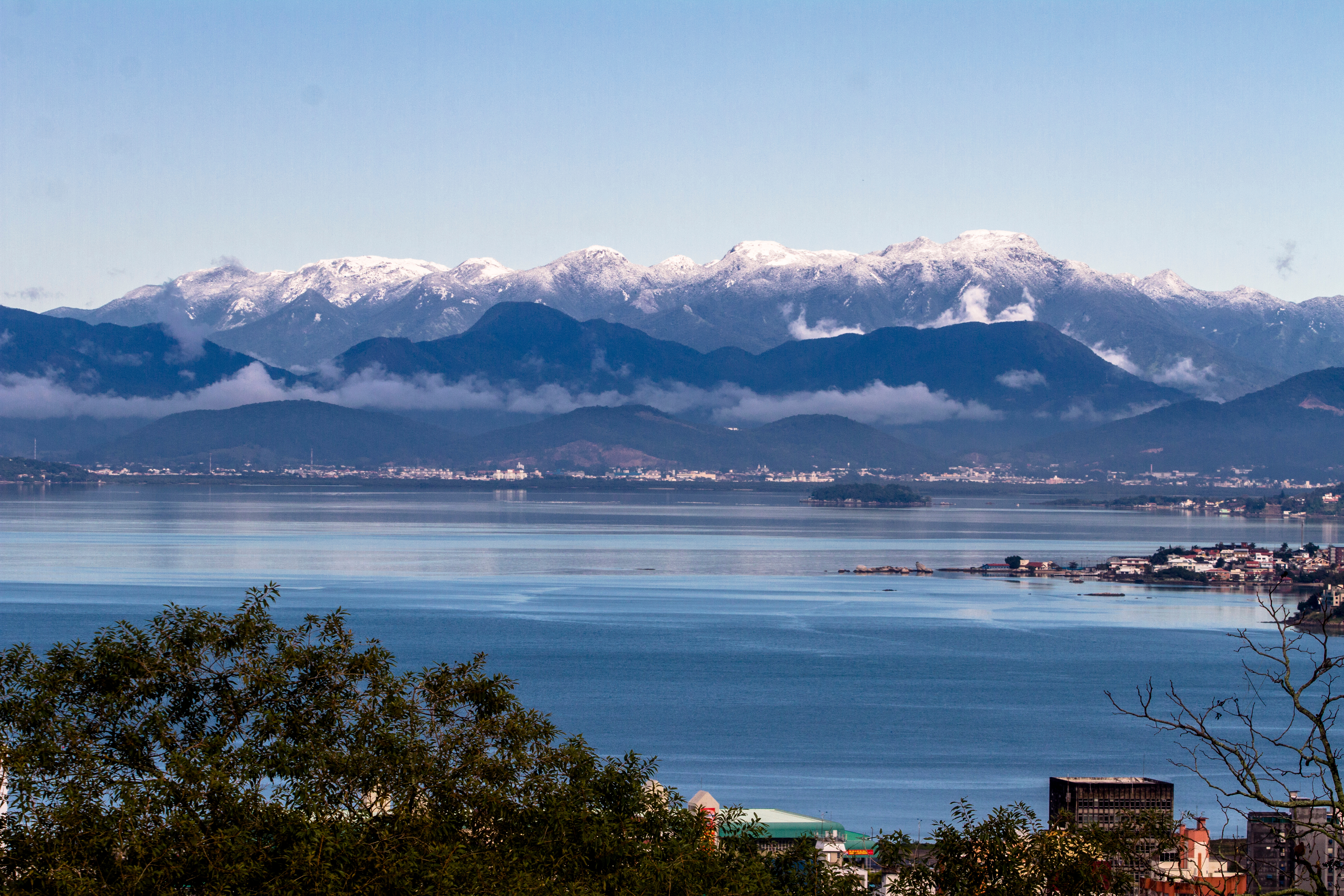
Snow in mountains near Florianópolis, Santa Catarina

The three states in the temperate South: Paraná, Rio Grande do Sul, and Santa Catarina—cover 577,214 square kilometers (222,864 sq mi), or 6.8% of the national territory. The population of the South in 1991 was 23.1 million, or 14% of the country's total. The region is almost as densely settled as the Southeast, but the population is more concentrated along the coast. The major cities are Curitiba and Porto Alegre. The inhabitants of the South enjoy relatively high living standards. Because of its industry and agriculture, Paraná had the highest average income in 1994, US$3,674, while Santa Catarina, a land of small farmers and small industries, had slightly less, US$3,405.

In addition to the Atlantic Forest and Araucaria moist forests, much of which were cleared in the post-World War II period, the southernmost portion of Brazil contains the Uruguayan savanna, which extends into Argentina and Uruguay. In 1982, 83.5% of the region had been altered by anthropic activity, with the highest level (89.7%) in Rio Grande do Sul, and the lowest (66.7%) in Santa Catarina. Agriculture—much of which, such as rice production, is carried out by small farmers—has high levels of productivity. There are also some important industries.

== Locations ==
Brazil occupies most of the eastern part of the South American continent and its geographic heartland, as well as various islands in the Atlantic Ocean. The only countries in the world that are larger are Russia, Canada, China, and the United States. The national territory extends 4,395 kilometers (2,731 mi) from north to south (5°16'20" N to 33°44'32" S latitude), and 4,319 kilometers (2,684 mi) from east to west (34°47'30" W to 73°59'32" W longitude). It spans four time zones, the westernmost of which is equivalent to Eastern Standard Time in the United States. The time zone of the capital (Brasília) and of the most populated part of Brazil along the east coast (UTC-3) is two hours ahead of Eastern Standard Time. The Atlantic islands are in the easternmost time zone.

Brazil possesses the archipelago of Fernando de Noronha, located 350 kilometers (217 mi) northeast of its "horn", and several small islands and atolls in the Atlantic - Abrolhos, Atol das Rocas, Penedos de São Pedro e São Paulo, Trindade, and Martim Vaz. In the early 1970s, Brazil claimed a territorial sea extending 362 kilometers (225 mi) from the country's shores, including those of the islands.

On Brazil's east coast, the Atlantic coastline extends 7,367 kilometers (4,578 mi). In the west, in clockwise order from the south, Brazil has 15,719 kilometers (9,767 mi) of borders with Uruguay, Argentina, Paraguay, Bolivia, Peru, Colombia, Venezuela, Guyana, Suriname, and French Guiana (overseas department of France). The only South American countries with which Brazil does not share borders are Chile and Ecuador. A few short sections are in question, but there are no true major boundary controversies with any of the neighboring countries. Brazil has the 10th largest Exclusive Economic Zone of 3,830,955 km^{2} (1,479,140 mi^{2}).
