= Calaveras Big Trees =

Calaveras Big Trees may refer to:

- Calaveras Big Trees State Park, California, U.S.
- Calaveras Big Tree National Forest, California, U.S.

== See also ==
- Calaveras (disambiguation)
- Big Trees (disambiguation)
