= Calaveras County Airport =

Calaveras County Airport Maury Rasmussen Field
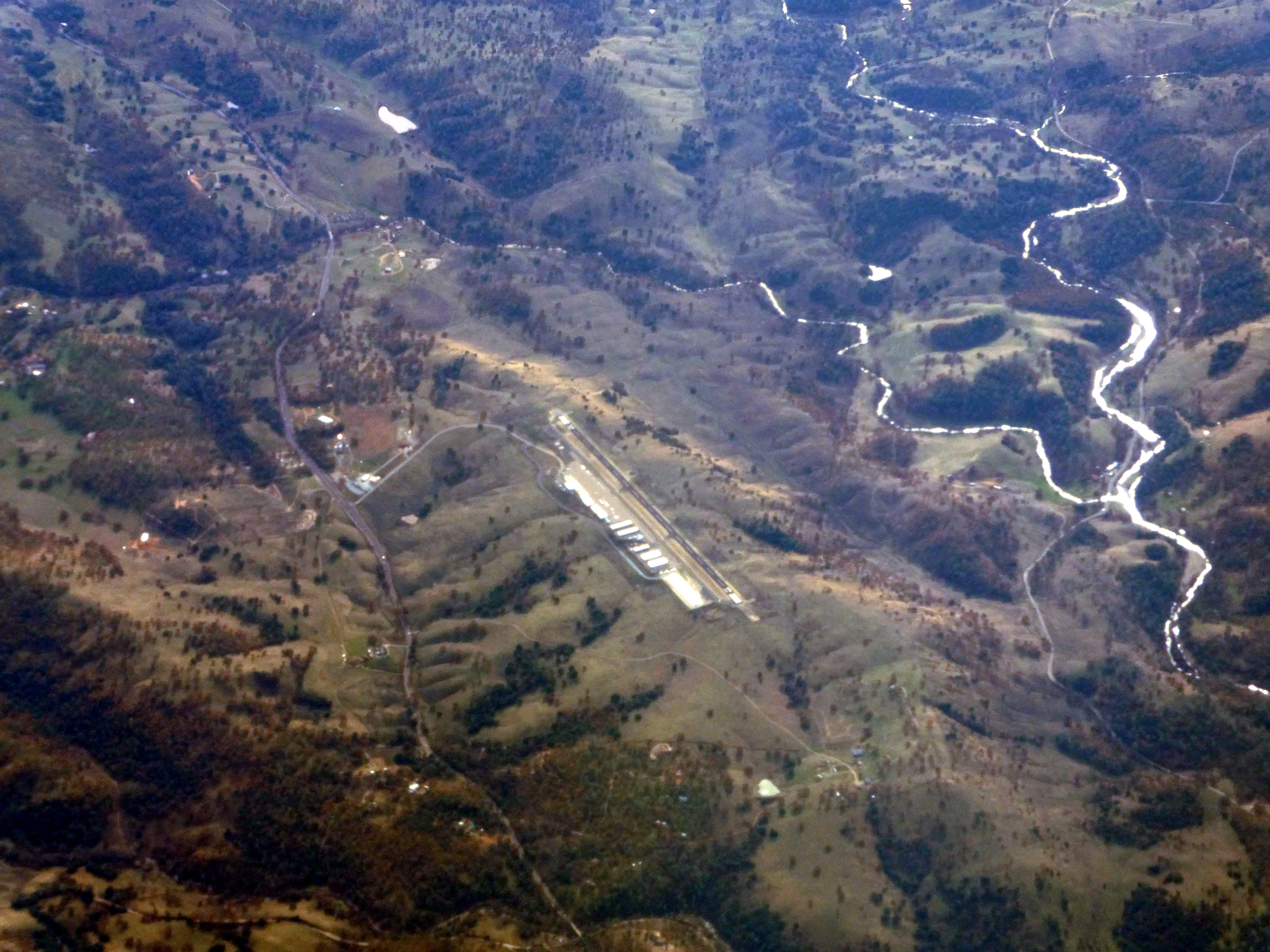
- IATA: none; ICAO: KCPU; FAA LID: CPU

Summary
- Airport type: Public
- Owner: County of Calaveras
- Location: San Andreas, California, U.S.
- Elevation AMSL: 1,325 ft (404 m)
- Coordinates: 38°08′46″N 120°38′53″W
- Interactive map of Calaveras County Airport

Runways
Direction	Length		Surface
Direction	ft	m	Surface
13/31	3,603	1,098	Asphalt

Helipads
Number	Length		Surface
Number	ft	m	Surface
H1	65	20	Asphalt
H2	65	20	Asphalt

Statistics (2005)
- Aircraft operations: 25,000
- Based aircraft: 79
- Source: Federal Aviation Administration

Calaveras County Airport (ICAO: KCPU, FAA LID: CPU), also known as Maury Rasmussen Field, is a public airport located four miles (6 km) southeast of the central business district of San Andreas, in Calaveras County, California, United States. It is owned by the County of Calaveras.

Although most U.S. airports use the same three-letter location identifier for the FAA and IATA, Calaveras County Airport is assigned CPU by the FAA but has no designation from the IATA (which assigned CPU to Cururupu, Maranhão, Brazil).

== Facilities and aircraft ==
Calaveras County Airport covers an area of 93 acres (38 ha) which contains one runway (13/31: 3,603 x 60 ft.) and two helipads (both 65 x 65 ft.).

For the 12-month period ending September 21, 2005, the airport had 25,000 aircraft operations, an average of 68 per day, all of which were general aviation. There are 79 aircraft based at this airport: 98% single engine, 1% multi-engine and 1% ultralight.
