= 1913 El Paso smelters' strike =

American labor dispute in Texas

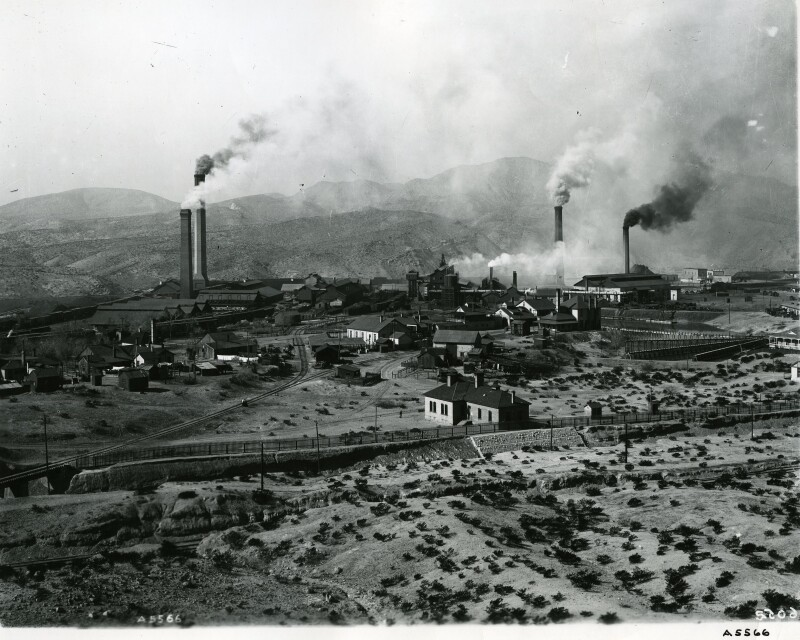
- Photo of Smeltertown & ASARCO Plant in the 1910s
- Date: April 10 – June 30, 1913 (Note: While a start date of April 10 is given in a contemporary source, sources are unclear regarding an official end date for the strike. According to a 1995 book by historian Philip J. Mellinger, the strike was mostly broken by late June 1913. Additionally, contemporary reports issued by the company on June 30 state that they had returned to prestrike production levels by that time. A magazine published on August 14, 1913, by the Western Federation of Miners also states that the strike had been broken by that time.) (2 months, 2 weeks and 6 days)
- Location: El Paso, Texas, United States
- Caused by: Increasing tensions between Mexican workers and smelter management
- Goals: Daily wage increase from $1.40 to $1.75; Eight-hour day; Changes to company store policy; Replacement of the company physician; Union recognition
- Methods: Strike action; Walkout
- Result: Strike crushed after company began to bring in strikebreakers and evict strikers and their families from company-owned housing

Parties
Smelters: Industrial Workers of the World; Western Federation of Miners El Paso Mill and Smelter Workers Local Number 78	American Smelting and Refining Company

Casualties
- Death: 1

The 1913 El Paso smelters' strike was a labor strike involving workers of the American Smelting and Refining Company's copper smelting plant in El Paso, Texas, United States. The workers, almost entirely Mexican Americans, went on strike on April 10, primarily seeking a pay increase, among other demands. The strike collapsed by the end of June, with many of the strikers leaving El Paso in the aftermath.

During the early 1900s, the smelting plant in the border town employed about 3,000 workers, primarily recent immigrants from Mexico. El Paso during this time was a hotbed for radical political activity, and Mexican workers in the city engaged in numerous labor strikes wherein they demanded better wages and improved working conditions. In 1907, the smelting plant was hit by a strike that was partially successful, resulting in pay increases, but also the firing of many strikers. By 1913, tensions had again mounted in the plant, with many workers pushing for a pay increase from $1.40 to $1.75 per day. Additional demands included a reduction in working hours from 12 to 8 per day, changes to the company store policies, and the replacement of the company physician. On April 10, about 100 workers performed a spontaneous walkout, and within the next few weeks, about 1,000 workers were on strike.

During the labor dispute, both the Industrial Workers of the World and the Western Federation of Miners (WFM) fought to recruit strikers to their labor unions, with the latter going as far as creating a local union, though neither group gained full control over the strike. The company benefitted from having the support of local law enforcement officials and, later, the Texas Rangers, and within a few weeks, they began to bring in strikebreakers. In late April, the Texas Rangers and strikers were involved in several confrontations that resulted in a Ranger shooting and killing one striker and injuring another. The strikebreakers damaged the strike, and the strikers were further hurt when the company began to evict strikers and their families from company-owned homes in the Smeltertown neighborhood surrounding the plant. By late June, the strike had been broken. While many strikers attempted to get their jobs back, many were not rehired, and the WFM organized new metallurgical jobs for many workers in places throughout the Southwestern United States.

While the strike ended in failure for the workers, several historians have noted the significance of the strike, with historian Monica Perales stating in a 2010 book that, "[a]lthough it ultimately failed, the action represented a critical moment in border labor history and revealed that the Mexican workers were willing to risk their jobs and their lives to be respected as smelter men". Additionally, historian Philip J. Mellinger speculates that many of the strikers who left El Paso after the strike may have been involved in future labor disputes involving Mexican Americans in the region. At El Paso, the WFM local union barely survived the strike with a few dozen members, but it would not be until the 1930s and 1940s that the Congress of Industrial Organizations succeeded in organizing the plant, later leading a strike in 1946. In the 1970s, residents of Smeltertown were forced to relocate after environmental studies revealed dangerous amounts of lead in the area due to the plant.

== Background ==
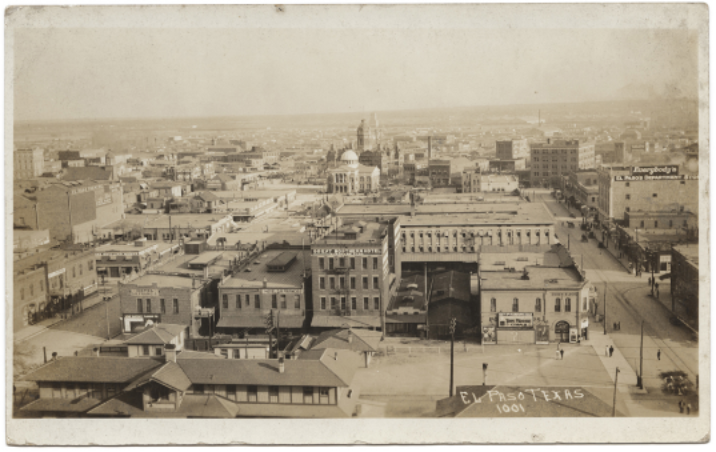
El Paso, Texas, c. 1910

In the early 1900s, the American Smelting and Refining Company, which was owned by the Guggenheim family of New York City, operated a copper smelting plant in El Paso, Texas. The smelter was one of the largest industries in the city and employed about 3,000 people, primarily Mexican Americans, who lived in the nearby Smeltertown neighborhood.

During this time, El Paso and its neighboring city of Ciudad Juárez across the Mexico–United States border in Mexico, were hotbeds for radical political activity, primarily among the Mexican populations. Mexican workers in El Paso engaged in several labor strikes in an effort to obtain better pay and working conditions, such as in 1901, when about 200 Mexican construction workers for the El Paso Electric Street Car Company went on strike, demanding a wage increase of 50 percent. In 1907, about 150 workers at the smelter went on strike, demanding a wage increase from $1.20 to 1.50 per day. This strike ended in partial success for the smelters, as the company agreed to a $1.40 daily wage, but also fired several workers who had been involved in the labor dispute. This strike was one in a series of labor disputes concerning Mexican workers in the metallurgical industry in the Southwestern United States during this time. By 1912, the Industrial Workers of the World (IWW), a militant labor union, had established a presence in the city, with several organizers from their regional offices in Phoenix, Arizona, traveling to the city. However, despite this, the Mexican workers at the smelter were nonunionized.

In early 1913, tensions began to escalate between the workers and plant management, reaching a peak in April. At the time, the workers worked 12-hour shifts and made $1.40 per day. However, many workers began to demand a wage increase to $1.75 per day. Additionally, some of the workers wanted an eight-hour day, and others had grievances against the company physician and the company store, pushing for changes to the latter and a replacement of the former.

== Course of the strike ==
=== Initial strike action ===
On April 10, the workers began a strike against the smelter with a spontaneous walkout of about 100 workers. The next day, an additional 300 workers joined the strike, and by the third day, about 650 Mexican workers were on strike. By mid-April, the strike involved about 1,000 workers. The only non-Mexican workers were five non-Hispanic white carpenters who worked at the smelter. These five men were union members affiliated with the American Federation of Labor (AFL). Through the duration of the strike, about 250 non-Hispanic white workers, mostly Anglo and Irish Americans, continued to report to work at the smelter. About a week after the start of the strike, some of the striking carpenters spoke at a meeting of El Paso's Central Labor Union (CLU), the local membership organization of the AFL, and convinced them to lend their support to the strike. The CLU donated $15 to the strike fund and toned down the anti-Mexican sentiment that was often present in their publications. However, according to historian Philip J. Mellinger, this support may not have been wholehearted, as some of the non-Hispanic white workers at the smelter were union members, and had the CLU been fully willing to support the strike, they could have called on greater solidarity from these workers.

=== IWW vs WFM ===
During the dispute, both the IWW and the competing Western Federation of Miners (WFM) had organizers present in El Paso in an attempt to organize the strikers with their respective unions. IWW organizer Fernando Palomarez had about 200 workers sign up with the union during the strike, saying, "the winning of this strike will be the means of organizing large unions of Mexicans all over Texas and the South". While the exact role that the IWW played in the strike is difficult to ascertain with certainty, Mellinger states that the organization "was only a minor player" in the strike. However, according to historian Mario T. García, the IWW presence contributed to the CLU's decision to support the strike, and the CLU pushed the strikers to affiliate with the more conservative and AFL-affiliated WFM. Additionally, the CLU disputed a claim made by a local newspaper that the IWW had initiated the strike. The WFM sent organizer Charles Tanner to help organize the strikers, and the union established a local union (El Paso Mill and Smelter Workers Local Number 78) that signed up 413 members. In addition to demands for increased pay and changes to the company's physician and store policies, this local union also added union recognition as a demand. Ultimately, neither union gained control of the strike, and many strikers remained nonunionized during the strike. Local strike leaders held rallies and meetings where they kept fellow strikers informed and sought to prevent the hiring of strikebreakers.

=== End of the strike ===
From the beginning of the strike, the smelter management had the support of local law enforcement. The sheriff of El Paso County, Texas, requested additional support from the Texas Rangers, and several rangers were stationed in El Paso during the strike. In the second week of the strike, the company began to bring in strikebreakers, including about 350 African Americans that they brought in via train from East Texas and Louisiana. Others hired included a large number of local non-Hispanic whites and recent Mexican immigrants, and these strikebreakers were protected by company guards, Texas Rangers, and other law enforcement officers. On April 22, a confrontation occurred when strikers began throwing rocks at strikebreakers outside of the smelter, and one Texas Ranger responded by opening fire at the strikers, injuring one. The following day, another confrontation broke out between strikers, strikebreakers, and Texas Rangers that saw one striker shot dead by a Texas Ranger. Eventually, the company began to evict striking employees and their families from company-owned housing, with the smelter owning 98 houses in the area. By late June, the strike appeared to be crushed, and reports by the company issued on June 30 stated that they were operating at prestrike capacity.

== Aftermath ==
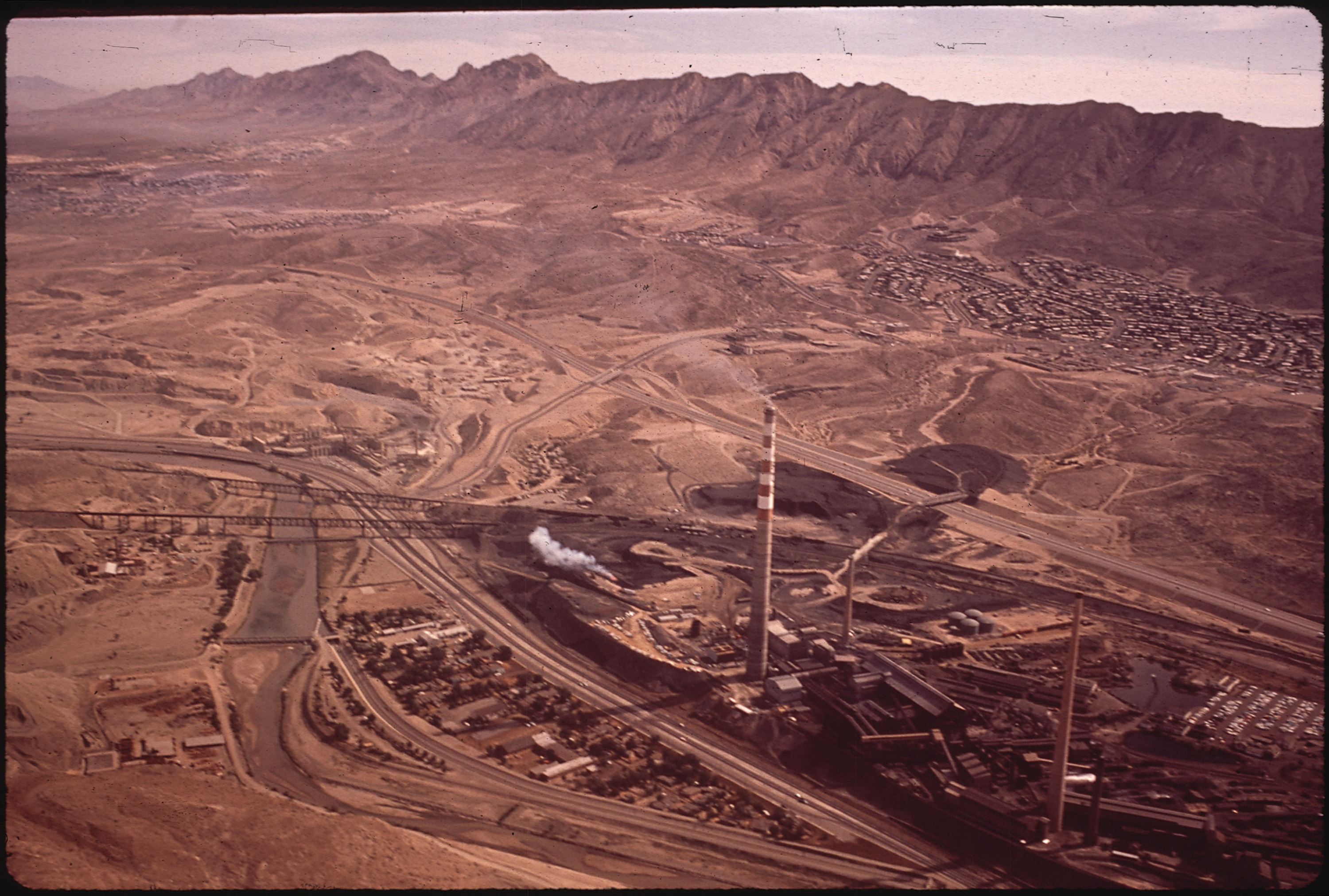
The copper smelting plant in El Paso, Texas, 1972

Speaking of the strike in a 1981 book, García called the 1913 dispute "one of the largest strikes in El Paso's early history". The strike marked one of the first largescale disputes between the IWW and the WFM over organizing workers, and for the WFM, it marked one of their first large attempts to organize Mexican workers in the Southwest. According to historian Katherine Benton-Cohen, the strike for the IWW was "a harbinger" of later IWW activity in Bisbee, Arizona. While the WFM local union survived the strike, claiming about 40 members in 1914, the company refused to rehire many of the strikers, and by the end of 1913, many of them had left El Paso. Following the strike's collapse, Tanner helped to get the strikers jobs elsewhere throughout the American Southwest. According to an article published by the WFM shortly after the strike's end, the strike may have been undercut by a large availability of workers caused by a mass influx of refugees to El Paso during the Mexican Revolution.

Speaking of the strike in a 1996 book, historian Camille Guerin-Gonzales stated that, despite its failure, "Mexican immigrant workers had demonstrated their organizational abilities and showed their willingness to fight exploitative conditions", while historian Monica Perales stated in a 2010 book that, "[a]lthough it ultimately failed, the action represented a critical moment in border labor history and revealed that the Mexican workers were willing to risk their jobs and their lives to be respected as smelter men". According to Mellinger, "[m]ore Mexican working-class community activism developed in the Southwest soon after this strike", and Mellinger theorizes that some of the workers who left El Paso and took up jobs in other metallurgical fields throughout the American Southwest may have been involved in other labor disputes over the next several years. It would not be until the 1930s and 1940s that another major push for unionizing the Mexican workers of the smelter came to fruition, this time under the leadership of the Congress of Industrial Organizations, and the 1913 strike would remain the last one at the plant until a 1946 strike that also involved workers for the Phelps-Dodge smelting plant in El Paso. In the 1970s, residents of Smeltertown were forced to relocate after environmental studies revealed hazardous amounts of lead in the area caused by the smelter.

== Sources ==
- Acuña, Rodolfo F. (2007). Corridors of Migration: The Odyssey of Mexican Laborers, 1600–1933. Tucson, Arizona: University of Arizona Press. ISBN 978-0-8165-4329-8.
- Alexander, Bob (2013). Riding Lucifer's Line: Ranger Deaths Along the Texas–Mexico Border. Foreword by Byron A. Johnson. Denton, Texas: University of North Texas Press. ISBN 978-1-57441-499-8.
- Benton-Cohen, Katherine (2009). Borderline Americans: Racial Division and Labor War in the Arizona Borderlands. Cambridge, Massachusetts: Harvard University Press. ISBN 978-0-674-05355-7.
- "American Smelting & Refining Co". Commercial & Financial Chronicle. 97 (2515). New York City: William B. Dana Company: 663. September 6, 1913.
- De León, Arnoldo (2010). "More than a Somnolent Type: Tejanos Resist the Rule of Dominance". In Cullen, David O'Donald; Wilkison, Kyle G. (eds.). The Texas Left: The Radical Roots of Lone Star Liberalism. College Station, Texas: Texas A&M University Press. pp. 191–208. ISBN 978-1-60344-189-6.
- Derickson, Alan (1988). Workers' Health, Workers' Democracy: The Western Miners' Struggle, 1891–1925. Ithaca, New York: Cornell University Press. ISBN 978-1-5017-4569-0.
- "Chronology of Mining for April, 1913". The Engineering and Mining Journal. 95 (19): 958. May 10, 1913.
- "Semi-Annual Report of American Smelting & Refining Co". Engineering and Mining World. XXXIX (11). Chicago: Mining World Company: 474. September 13, 1913.
- García, Mario T. (1981). Desert Immigrants: The Mexicans of El Paso, 1880–1920. New Haven, Connecticut: Yale University Press. ISBN 978-0-300-02883-6.
- Green, George N. (July 2004). "The Texas Labor Movement, 1870-1920". The Southwestern Historical Quarterly. 108 (1). Texas State Historical Association: 1–26. ISSN 0038-478X. JSTOR 30239492.
- Guerin-Gonzales, Camille (1996) [1994]. Mexican Workers and American Dreams: Immigration, Repatriation, and California Farm Labor, 1900–1939 (Second paperback ed.). New Brunswick, New Jersey: Rutgers University Press. ISBN 978-0-8135-2048-3.
- Harris, Charles Houston; Sadler, Louis R. (2007) [2004]. The Texas Rangers and the Mexican Revolution: The Bloodiest Decade, 1910–1920 (First paperbound ed.). Albuquerque, New Mexico: University of New Mexico Press. ISBN 978-0-8263-3484-8.
- Hepting, John (August 14, 1913). "The Fight in Michigan is a Life and Death Battle". The Miner's Magazine. XIV (529). Denver: Western Federation of Miners: 11–13.
- Ivey, Darren L. (2018). The Ranger Ideal. Vol. 2: Texas Rangers in the Hall of Fame, 1874–1930. Denton, Texas: University of North Texas Press. ISBN 978-1-57441-744-9.
- Kohout, Martin Donell (March 5, 2019) [July 1, 1995]. "Smeltertown, TX". Handbook of Texas. Texas State Historical Association. Archived from the original on January 30, 2023.
- Mellinger, Philip J. (1995). Race and Labor in Western Copper: The Fight for Equality, 1896–1918. Tucson, Arizona: University of Arizona Press. ISBN 978-0-8165-4772-2.
- Perales, Monica (2010). Smeltertown: Making and Remembering a Southwest Border Community. Chapel Hill, North Carolina: University of North Carolina Press. ISBN 978-0-8078-9956-4.
