= Crystal skull (disambiguation) =

Crystal skull refers to a number of human-like skull carvings made of quartz crystal and their associated myth and research.

Crystal skull may also refer to:

- The Crystal Skull (video game), a 1996 adventure game
- Crystal Skull (Stargate SG-1), an episode of the TV show Stargate SG-1
- Indiana Jones and the Kingdom of the Crystal Skull, the fourth movie in the Indiana Jones franchise.
- "Crystal Skull", a single by Mastodon from the album Blood Mountain

== See also ==
- Skull (disambiguation)
