= Scull (disambiguation) =

Scull may refer to:

== Boat propulsion and boats ==
- Scull, a kind of oar used in sculling, a form of rowing, a technique to propel watercraft
- Single scull, double scull, quad scull, types of rowing boat
- Stern sculling, a method of using a single oar over the stern to propel a boat

== People ==
- Antonio Scull, (born 1965), first baseman with Industriales of the Cuban National Series
- Christina Scull, researcher and writer best known for her books about the works of J. R. R. Tolkien
- Edward Scull (1818–1900), Republican member of the U.S. House of Representatives from Pennsylvania
- Scull Twins (1930s–2000s), Cuban sister art duo, of Chinese descent

== Places ==
- Scull Shoals, Georgia, a ghost town in Greene County, United States

== See also ==
- Skull (disambiguation), a homophone
- SCUL, the Subversive Choppers Urban Legion, a Boston-based modified bicycle group
