= Parcel de Manuel Luís Marine State Park =

State park in Maranhão, Brazil

- Parque Estadual Marinho do Parcel de Manuel Luís
- IUCN category II (national park)
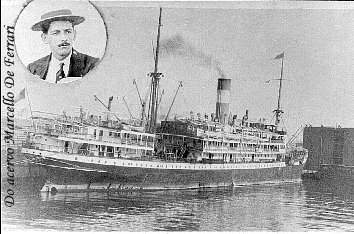
- Passenger steamship Uberaba. In 1921 she ran aground and was wrecked on the Manoel Luis reef.

- Location within Brazil
- Nearest city: Cururupu, Maranhão
- Coordinates: 0°54′48″S 44°19′10″W
- Area: 45,937 hectares (113,510 acres)
- Designation: State park
- Created: 11 June 1991
- Administrator: Secretaria de Estado de Meio Ambiente e Recursos Naturais

Ramsar Wetland
- Official name: Parque Estadual Marinho do Parcel Manoel Luís including the Baixios do Mestre Álvaro and Tarol
- Designated: 28 February 2000
- Reference no.: 1021

The Parcel de Manuel Luís Marine State Park (Portuguese: Parque Estadual Marinho do Parcel de Manuel Luís) is a state park in the state of Maranhão, Brazil. It protects the Manuel Luis Reefs, an important coral reef of the south Atlantic. The reefs contain the wrecks of many ships.

== Location ==
The Parcel de Manuel Luís Marine State Park is in the Atlantic ocean offshore from the municipality of Cururupu, Maranhão. The reef is named for the fisherman Manuel Luís, who discovered the rock formation in the late nineteenth century. The corals grow on a granite reef and cover an area of 1,800 hectares (4,400 acres). The park has an area of 45,937 hectares (113,510 acres), 45 miles (72 km) from Maiau Island and 50 miles (80 km) from Lençóis Island.

== History ==
The coral reefs along 3,000 kilometres (1,900 mi) of the northeast coast of Brazil from the south of Bahia to Maranhão are rapidly degrading due to destructive use. The state park was considered one of the seven highest priorities for conservation of the reefs.

The Parcel de Manuel Luís Marine State Park was created by decree 11.902 of 11 June 1991 with the purpose of protecting the largest coral reef of South America from the environmental impacts of hydrocarbon pollution and over fishing. The state park was to protect the marine fauna and flora and natural scenic beauty, under the administration of SEMATUR. It was to be used for scientific, educational and recreational uses that would avoid changes or environmental impact. The state park became a Ramsar Site in February 2000.

== Environment ==
The reef is an area of great biodiversity, holding all the coral reef species found on the northeast coast. Coral species include Agaricia agaricites, Agaricia fragilis, Meandrina braziliensis, Great star coral Montastraea cavernosa, Mussismilia hispida, Porites astreoides, Scolymia wellsi, Siderastrea stellata and Millepora alcicornis. The corals are home to multi-coloured fish such as parrotfish, sergeant major and butterflyfish, and to larger species such as groupers and sea turtles. Coral bleaching has been reported since 1999.

== Shipwrecks ==
The Parcel de Manuel Luís is in an area of strong currents and variable tides, and for many years was poorly charted. At low tide depths may be no more than 1 metre (3 ft 3 in). There are over 200 shipwrecks, second only to the Bermuda Triangle. Wrecks on the reef include:

- 1763 São José
- 1770 Nossa Senhora das Necessidades
- 1805 Jeune Almirante
- 1814 Venus
- 1820 Portuguese frigate
- 1900 Navio do Cobre
- 1904 Salinas
- 1905 Cyril
- 1921 Uberaba
- 1946 West Point
- 1960 Altamar
- 1962 Ilha Grande
- 1984 Ana Cristina

The Navio do Cobre, as its name implies, was carrying a cargo of copper. This was recovered by looters. The Vandyck was an English liner that was carrying 200 passengers from Buenos Aires bound for New York, and was sunk in 1914 by a German ship during World War I (1914–18). All the passengers were saved. The Uberaba was originally the German naval vessel Henny Woerman, captured by the Brazilian Navy during World War I. The tanker Ana Cristina, the last to sink, is the best preserved.

== Sources ==
- Edison Lobão; Fernando César de Moreira Mesquita (11 June 1991), Decreto nº 11.902 de 11 de Junho de 1991 (PDF) (in Portuguese), State of Maranhão
- "Maranhão", naufragiosdobrasil (in Portuguese)
- Marcelo Carota (23 January 2015), Parcel de Manuel Luís, sítio Ramsar e parque marinho (in Portuguese), MMA: Ministério do Meio Ambiente, archived from the original on 23 May 2015
- PES Marinho do Parcel de Manuel Luís (in Portuguese), ISA: Instituto Socioambiental
- Shirley Amélia da Silva Leão (24 May 2010), Parque Estadual Marinho do Parcel de Manoel Luís (PDF) (in Portuguese), Secretaria de Estado do Meio Ambiente e Recursos Naturais do Maranhão
