= Smeltertown, Texas =

Former neighborhood of El Paso, Texas

Coordinates: 31°47′00″N 106°31′36″W

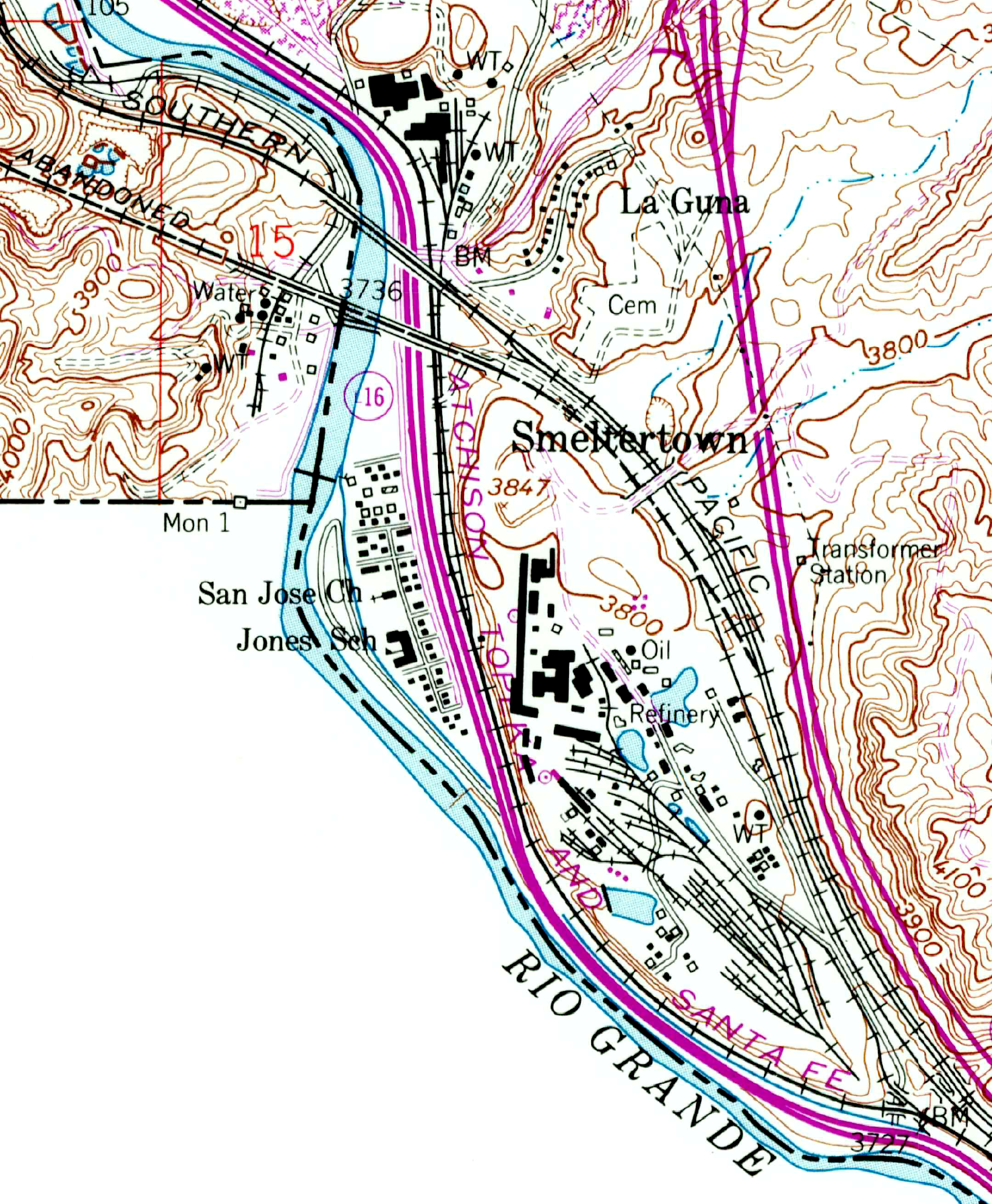
Topo map of Smeltertown, Texas, from 1955 1:24000 USGS topo map with 1975 updates. The small area labeled "La Guna" is now known as "La Calavera" or "Skull Canyon", for its location by the Smeltertown Cemetery.

Smeltertown was a residential community in El Paso County, Texas, housing the workers of the ASARCO smelter and their families, between El Paso and the Texas borders with Mexico and New Mexico.

With only one small neighborhood, now known as the La Calavera Historical Neighborhood, remaining since the Smelter's closure, Smeltertown is sometimes referred to as a ghost town.

The Smeltertown community was served by the San Jose church, and by the Jones School of the El Paso Independent School District.

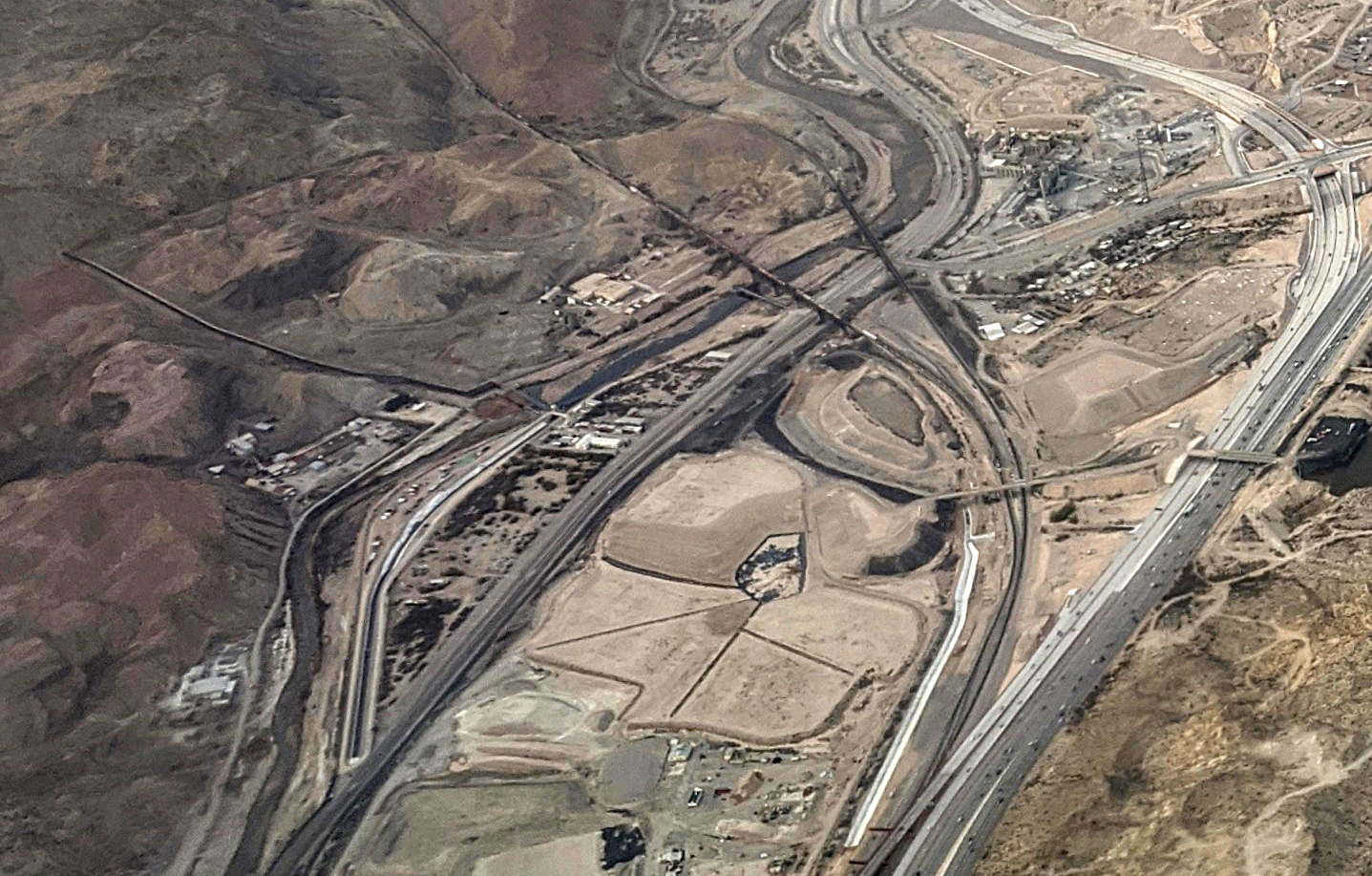
Abandoned baja part of Smeltertown is left of center here, with the American Dam Headquarters (white building) in it, near the American Dam on the Rio Grande, in this aerial view from over downtown El Paso. La Calavera is at upper right.

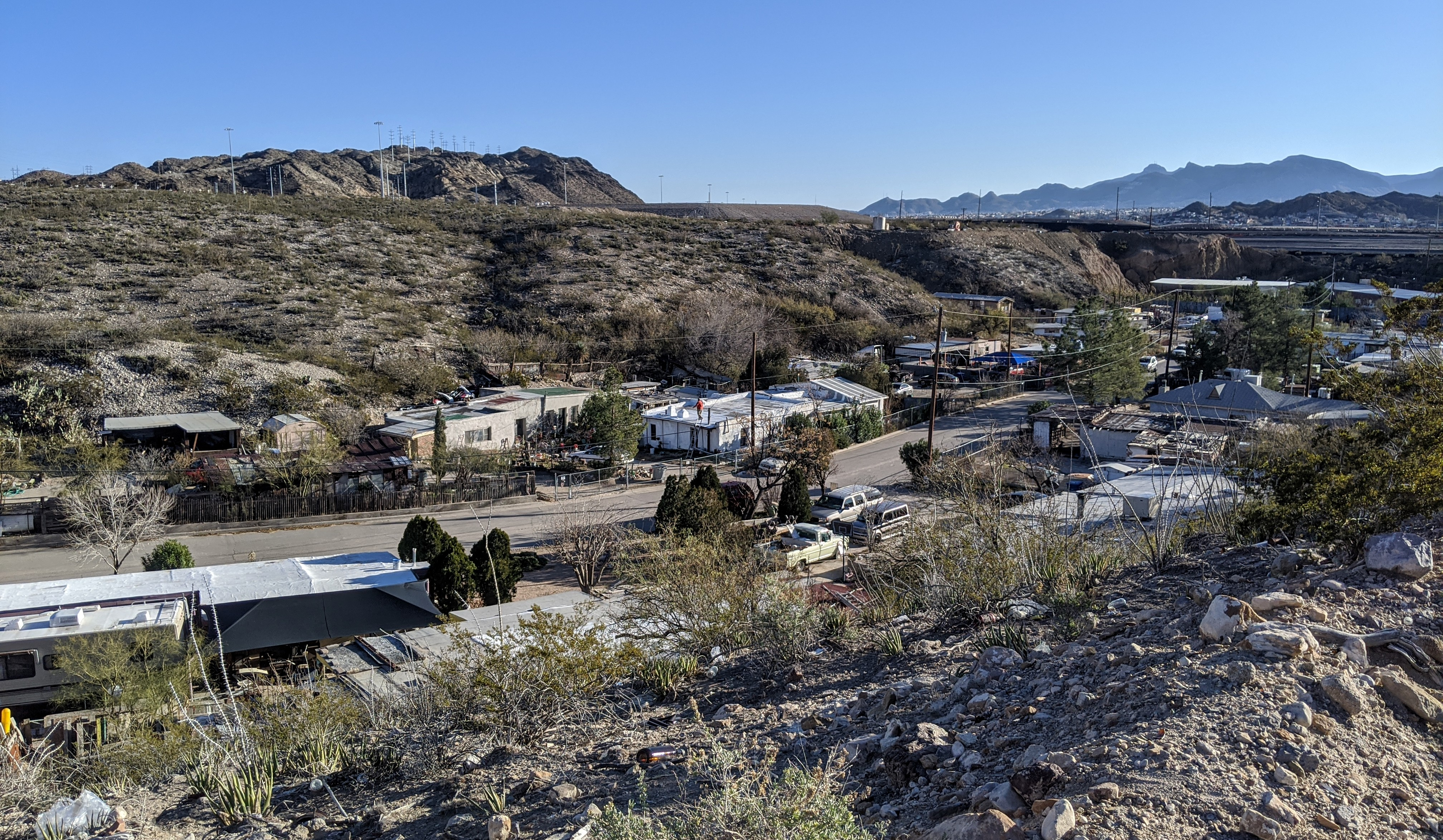
Looking down into La Calavera Historic Neighborhood from beside Executive Center Blvd.

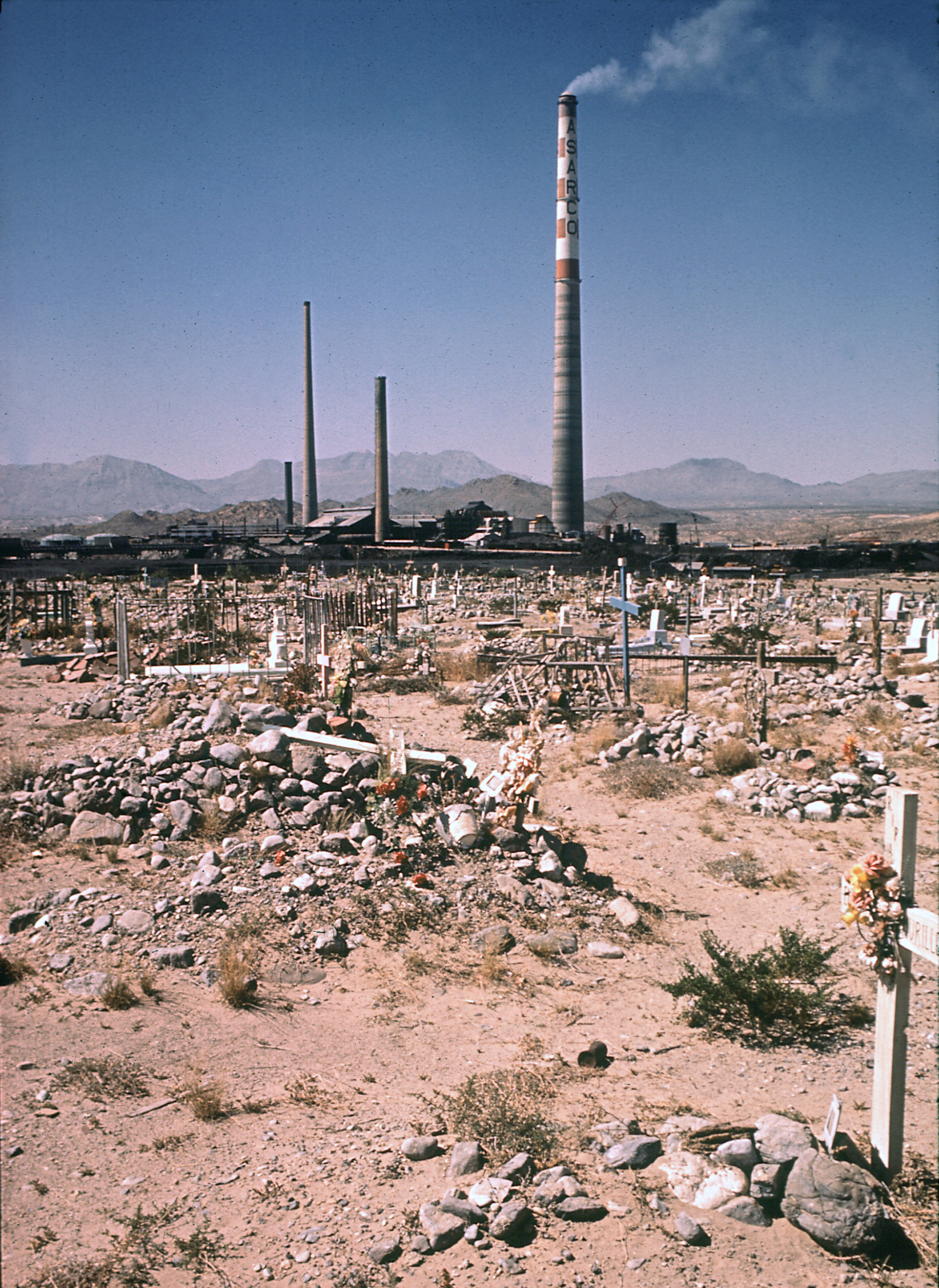
Smeltertown cemetery with ASARCO smelter chimneys in the background, still operating, in 1972.

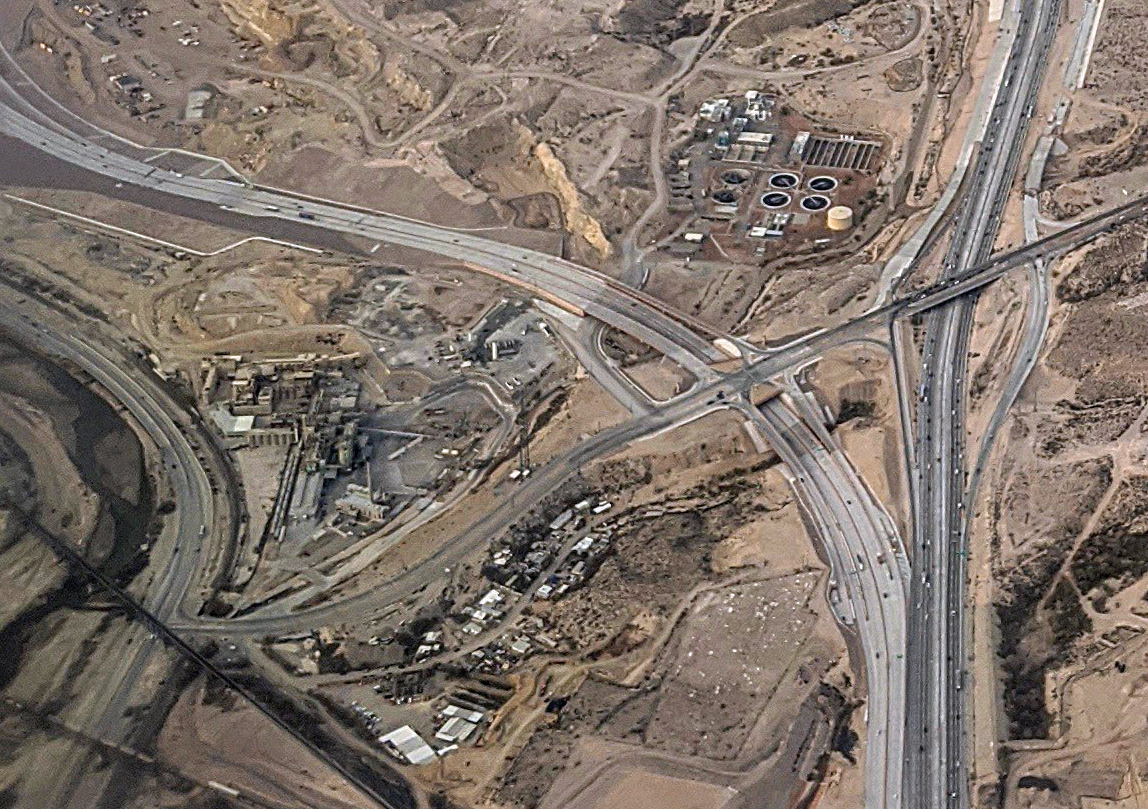
The new (in 2019) Border West Expressway single-point urban interchange – El Paso's first SPUI – is at Executive Center Blvd., which parallels San Marcos Drive of the La Calavera Historic Neighborhood of Smeltertown. The Smeltertown Cemetery is visible at the bottom by the expressway.

== See also ==
- 1913 El Paso smelters' strike
- List of ghost towns in Texas
