= Cururupu =

Coordinates: 1°50′S 44°52′W

- Municipality
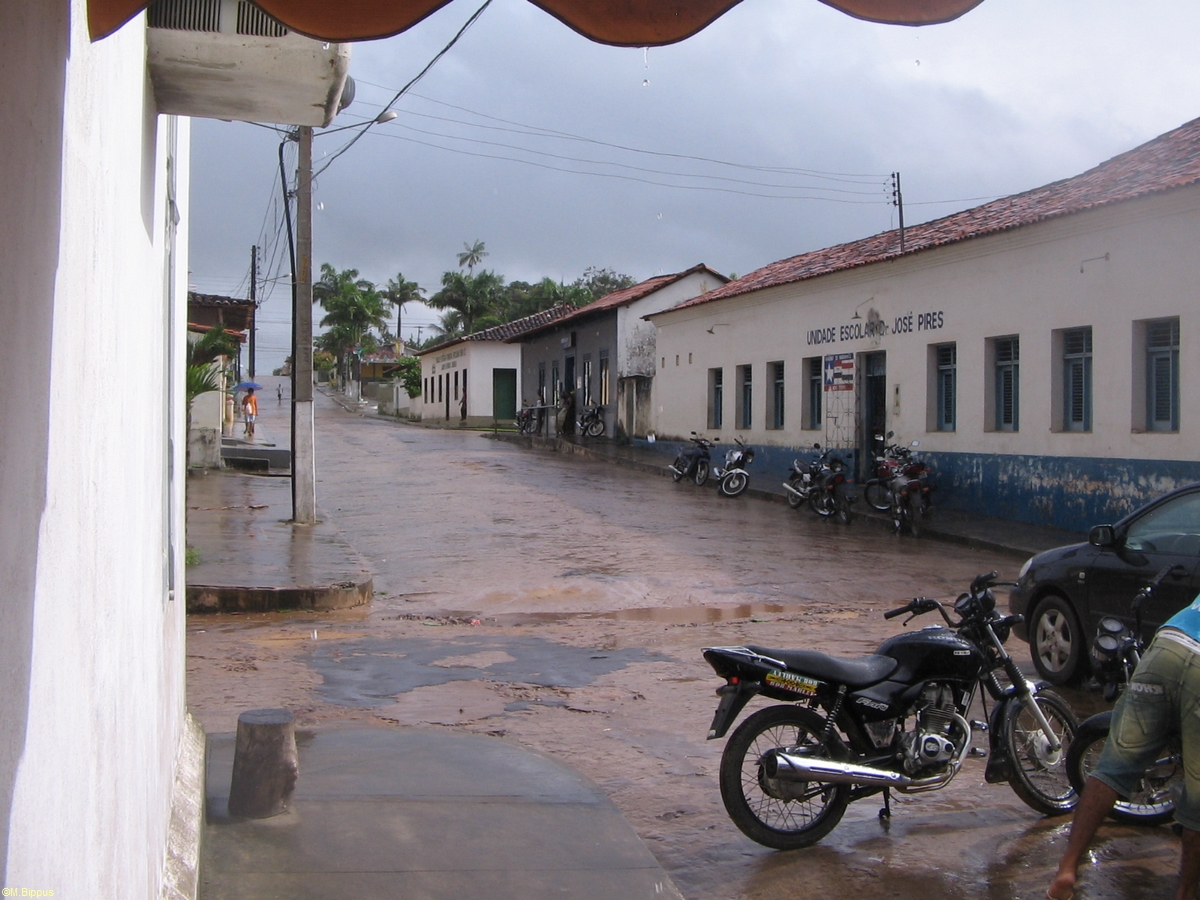
- Cururupu, José Pires School

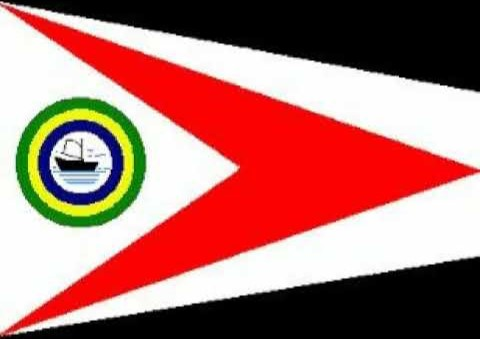
- Flag

- Location in Maranhão
- Country: Brazil
- Region: Nordeste
- State: Maranhão
- Mesoregion: Norte Maranhense

Area
  - Total: 361 sq mi (936 km^{2})

Population (2020)
  - Total: 32,626
- Time zone: UTC−3 (BRT)

Cururupu is a municipality in the state of Maranhão in the Northeast region of Brazil.

The waters offshore from the municipality contain the 45,937-hectare (113,510-acre) Parcel de Manuel Luís Marine State Park, created in 1991 to protect the largest coral reef of South America.

== See also ==
- List of municipalities in Maranhão
