= Cerro de la Calavera =

Mountain in California

Calavera Mountain
- Mount Calavera
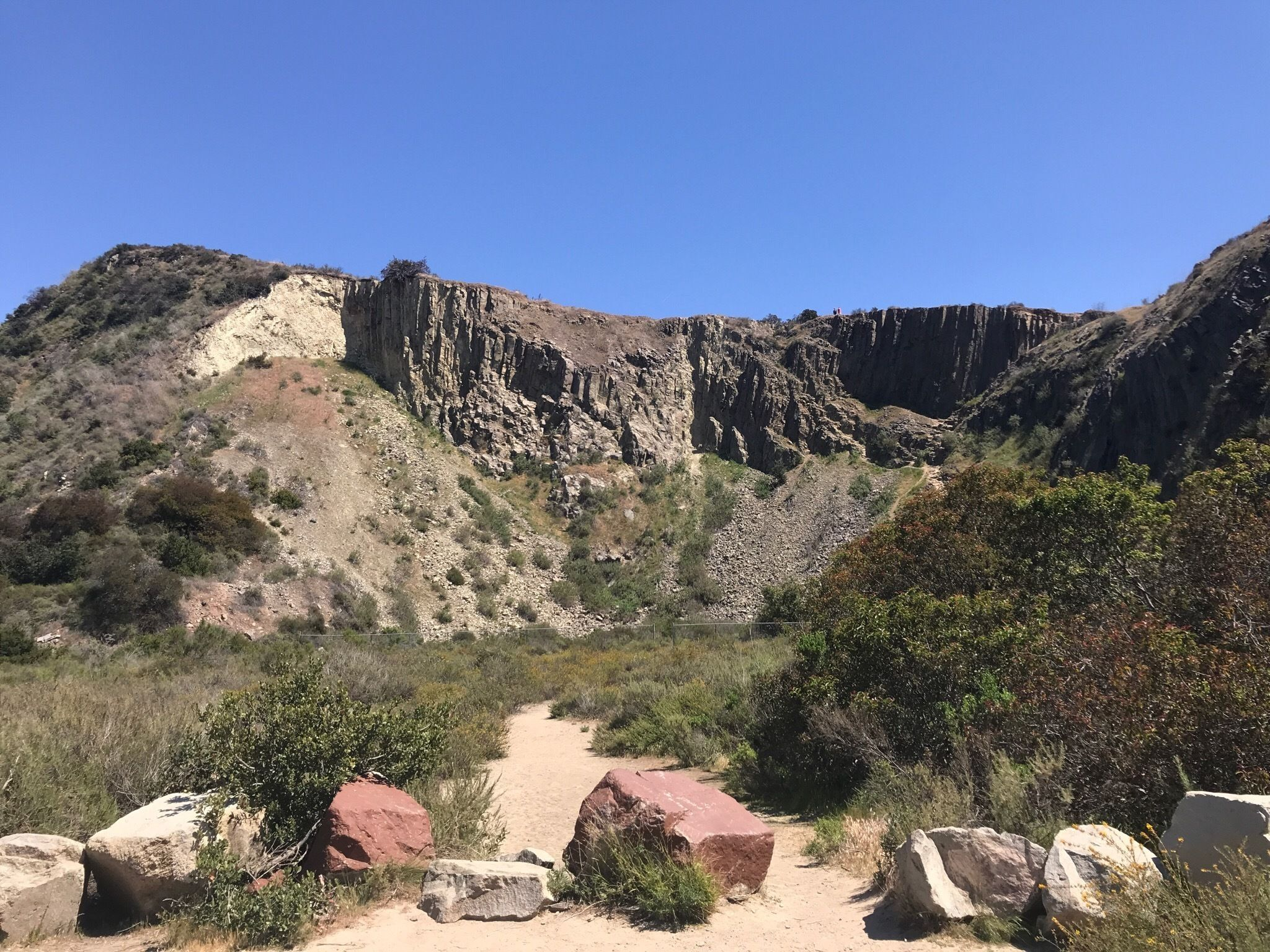
- Cerro de la Calavera from the northwest

Highest point
- Elevation: 513 ft (156 m)
- Prominence: 173 ft (53 m)
- Isolation: 0.94 mi (1.51 km)
- Coordinates: 33°10′03″N 117°16′54″W

Geography
- Location within California Location within the United States
- Location: Carlsbad, California, United States

Geology
- Last eruption: 22 million years ago, during the subduction of the Farallon Plate

Climbing
- Easiest route: hiking

Cerro de la Calavera (also known as Mount Calavera) is an 513 ft (156 m) ancient plug dome volcano that last erupted 22 million years ago during the subduction of the Farallon Plate. It is located within the city of Carlsbad, California in the United States. Cerro de la Calavera is only one of three volcanic plugs in Southern California and can easily be seen from either northbound Interstate 5 at Cannon Road or westbound on Lake Boulevard. Cerro de la Calavera is located within the Lake Calavera Preserve offering county maintained trails that lead directly into the ancient volcano, making for great hiking adventures. Lake Calavera and the dam that holds it lie in the shadow of the mountain.

== See also ==
- Pilot Knob (Imperial County, California)
- Malapai Hill
