= Kranea (disambiguation) =

Kranea (Greek: Κρανέα) may refer to:

- Kranea, a community in Preveza regional unit
- Kranea, Grevena, a village in Grevena regional unit
- Kranea, Karditsa, a village in Karditsa regional unit
- Krania, Elassona, a village in Larissa regional unit
- Krania, Kato Olympos, a village in Larissa regional unit
- Kranea, Pella, a village in Pella regional unit
- Kranea, Trikala, a village in Trikala regional unit
