= The Big Tree, Kirkwall =

Coordinates: 58.98254°N 2.95965°W

The Big Tree

The Big Tree is a sycamore (Acer pseudoplatanus) in Kirkwall, Orkney. It was named "Scotland's Tree of the Year" in the annual competition held by Woodland Trust Scotland, in 2017. The tree was nominated for the Scottish competition by Andrew Richards and Hazel Flett on behalf of the Kirkwall Community Council who also won a £1,000 grant from the Scottish Woodland Trust and Postcode Lottery. The prize money was used to stage a series of competitions to engage the public with the tree in the largely treeless islands.

The sycamore is thought to be more than 200 years old and now stands in the main thoroughfare of Albert Street, Kirkwall. It is under the care of Orkney Islands Council.

== History ==
The big tree has been used as a meeting place by generations of Orcadians, and it once stretched across to touch the windows of the building opposite. It was originally one of three trees within the privately owned garden of chemist Thomas Sclater. Sclater divided up his properties in the 1870s to create two shop fronts and started to chop down his trees to make use of the garden ground. There was a public outcry and the last tree was saved by the Kirkwall Town Council, who paid Sclater £5 to leave it standing. In a letter from Sclater to the Kirkwall Town Council dated 30 January 1875:

Sir,

To avoid litigation, and by way of compromise I hereby beg to offer to convey to the Town Council of Kirkwall my whole right and interest in and to the large Tree growing in front of my property in Albert Street for the sum of Five Pounds Sterling, the Council undertaking to keep it pruned on the side next my house so that the branches do not reach within six feet of the wall or roof.

Thos H Sclater

At a meeting on 3 February 'the arrangement come to with Mr T H Sclater for the preservation of the large Tree in front of his premises in Albert Street was reported.'

As Kirkwall grew the tree found itself part of the main street but in the mid 20th century, when the tree was given an notional life of only 5 years and Orkney County Council threatened to remove it, another public campaign saved it.

In 2009 Orkney Islands Council did some remediation work on the tree, hollowing out the dead core and reinforcing it with a metal pole.
