= Skull (card game) =

Card party game

- Other names: Skull and Roses
- Designers: Hervé Marly
- Illustrators: Rose Kipik; Thomas Vuarchex
- Publishers: Lui-même
- Publication: 2011; 15 years ago
- Genres: Card game; Party game
- Players: 3–6
- Playing time: 15–45 minutes
- Age range: 10+

Skull, also known as Skull and Roses, is a bluffing card game designed by Hervé Marly and published in 2011 by Lui-même. Players play face-down rose or skull cards, and bet how many they can turn over before a skull card is revealed until all but one player is eliminated or a player wins two rounds.

== Gameplay ==
All players start with a hand of four circular cards (three roses and one skull) and a playing mat in front of them. Going around the table, each player chooses one of their discs and places it face-down on their mat. Players play cards until someone makes a bet. The betting player bets a number of discs. After a challenge is made, players can choose to pass or raise the bet by naming a higher number.

Once all players except one have passed, the remaining player must flip over all of their own cards before they start flipping over others in any order. If they flip over the amount of rose discs equal to their bet without flipping over a skull, they win the round and flip over their mat. If a skull is flipped over, the player loses one card randomly chosen by the player whose card had the skull. Once a player has lost all four of their cards, that player is eliminated.

The game ends either when a player has flipped their mat twice (won two rounds) or only one player has not been eliminated.

== Reception ==
Skull was the winner of the 2011 As d'Or - Jeu de l'Année award. It was also nominated for the 2011 Spiel des Jahres, and the 2011 Japan Board Game Prize Voters' Selection award. In a review for Eurogamer, Quintin Smith praised the game for its fast pace, easy mechanics, tense gameplay. Robert Florence, of Rock Paper Shotgun, called it a "a lovely little game of bluffing and brinkmanship". Alex Meehan, writing for Dicebreaker, described Skull as "a deceptively simple, adrenaline-inducing bluffing and betting game" good for introducing inexperienced players. Wirecutter named it the best bluffing game of 2023. The game also received positive reviews from Shut Up & Sit Down and RPGnet.
