= Calavera (comics) =

Italian adult comic book

Calavera is an Italian adult comic book featuring a female character with razor claws named Francisca Calavera. It was created by Enrico Teodorani, published in Italy by E.F. edizioni, and in the U.S. by Carnal Comics as Calavera: Beautiful, Bloody & Bare.

Calavera is a Dr. Frankenstein's creature, but she hates her creator as she hates all monsters. In her adventures she has been a professional killer, a prostitute, a monster-huntress and a superheroine, and has crossed paths with other independent comics characters such as Marat Mychaels' Demonslayer, David Quinn and Tim Vigil's Faust, Tim Tyler's Blood Reign and Devil Jack, Bill Black's Femforce, Jason Crawley's Bloke and Ju Gomez's PsychoHunter and Son of 6. Special guest artists on the comic have included Joe Vigil, Tim Vigil, Jeff Austin, Tim Tyler, Jason Crager, Marat Mychaels, Ju Gomez, Jason Waltrip and Giacomo Pilato.
