= Calaveras Lake =

Calaveras Lake can refer to the following bodies of water:

- Calaveras Reservoir (California)
- Calaveras Lake (Texas)
