= Calaveras Unified School District =

School district in California, United States

Address
- 3304 West Highway 12 San Andreas, California, 95249; United States

District information
- Type: Public
- Grades: K–12
- Established: 1954
- Superintendent: Ronald Estes
- NCES District ID: 0606870

Students and staff
- Students: 2,858 (2024-25)
- Teachers: 117.73 (FTE)
- Staff: 122.09 (FTE)
- Student–teacher ratio: 23.41:1

Other information
- Website: www.calaverasusd.com

Calaveras Unified School District is a public school district based in Calaveras County, California that serves 2,858 students as of the 2024-2025 school year.

== Governance ==
Calaveras Unified School District is overseen by the Calaveras Board of Education. It includes five Board of Education members: Monica Remus, Lorraine Angel, Bryan Porath, Matt Brock, and Scott Crisp. These board members appoint a superintendent who carries out day-to-day operations of the district. The superintendent of Calaveras Unified School District is Dr. Ronald Estes, who is currently serving as Interim Superintendent. In the 2026-2027 school year, Kassandra Meeks will succeed Dr. Ronald Estes as superintendent.

== Schools ==
Calaveras Unified School District operates eight schools and one alternative education center including:

High Schools

- Calaveras High School
- Gold Strike High School

Middle Schools

- Toyon Middle School

Elementary Schools

- Jenny Lind Elementary School
- Mokelumne Hill Elementary School
- San Andreas Elementary School
- Valley Springs Elementary School

Alternative Learning Centers

- Calaveras Unified Alternative-Sierra Hills Education Center
