= Skull Creek =

Skull Creek may refer to:

== Australia ==
- Skull Creek (Northern Territory), a tributary of the Robinson River near Borroloola, Northern Territory
- Skull Creek (Queensland), a tributary of Saline Creek near Woorabinda, Queensland
- Skull Creek (Victoria), a tributary of the Mitchell River near the village of Lindenow, Victoria
- Skull Creek (Western Australia), a tributary of Lake Mason near the village of Sandstone in the Mid West, Western Australia

== United States ==
- Skull Creek (Beaufort County, South Carolina), a historic site
- Skull Creek Township, Butler County, Nebraska

== See also ==
- Skull Creek massacre, massacre of Karankawa people in Mexican Texas in February 1823
