= Ridge (disambiguation) =

A ridge is a long, narrow elevation of the land surface.

Ridge may also refer to:

- Ridge in a field, which divides troughs in ridge and furrow agriculture
- Ridge (roof), an architectural element on roofs
- Ridge (surname)

== Places ==
=== India ===
- The Ridge, Shimla, open space in Himachal Pradesh, India

=== United Kingdom ===
- Ridge, Dorset, a village in Dorset, England
- Ridge, Hertfordshire, a village in Hertfordshire, England
- Ridge, Wiltshire

=== United States ===
- Ridge, Lafayette Parish, Louisiana
- Ridge, Maryland
- Ridge, New York, a location on Long Island
- Ridge Township, Shelby County, Illinois
- West Ridge, Chicago, Illinois
- Ridge (CTA station), former railway station in Chicago
- Ridge, Robertson County, Texas
- Ridge, West Virginia

== Arts, entertainment, and media ==
=== Characters ===
- Ridge (comics), a character from Marvel Comics
- Ridge Forrester, a fictional character in the CBS soap opera The Bold and the Beautiful

=== Games ===
- Ridge Racer, an arcade game

=== Television ===
- Sophy Ridge on Sunday, a Sky News Sunday morning talk show fronted by Sophy Ridge

== Mathematics ==
- Ridge (differential geometry), curves of locally maximal curvature on surfaces in 3D
- Ridge (geometry), an (n-2)-dimensional element of a polytope
- Ridge regression, a statistical regularization method
- Ridge function, a multivariate function that decomposes into a projection and a univariate function

== Science ==
- Ridge (biology), a domain of the genome with a high gene expression
- Ridge (meteorology), an elongated region of relatively high atmospheric pressure
- Ridge detection, an image descriptor for capturing elongated objects that are brighter than their surrounding
- RIDGE (Radar Integrated Display with Geospatial Elements), in which weather radar images are projected on a map

== Other uses ==
- Ridge, a term used in dog breeding, meaning a ridge of hair that runs along the back in the opposite direction from the rest of the coat, e.g. on the Thai Ridgeback
- Ridge Vineyards, a wine producer in the Santa Cruz Mountains of California
- Ridge Cloud, a cloud provider offering a computing platform for users who want to run workloads with Kubernetes-based architectures in various locations

== See also ==
- The Ridge (disambiguation)
- Ridge Township (disambiguation)
- Ridge, Texas (disambiguation)
- Oak Ridge (disambiguation)
