= Cỏ dog =

Colloquial term for Vietnamese dog breeds

Cỏ dog or Chó cỏ (lit. 'Grass dog', Northern Vietnamese: [t͡ɕɔː˧˥ kɔː˧˩]) or Vietnamese dog is a colloquial Vietnamese term referring to purebred dogs that originate from or are very commonly found in Vietnam. That is to say, Cỏ dog is not a single breed but rather an arbitrary collection of multiple dog breeds. Currently, there are four valued Cỏ dog breeds in Vietnam called Tứ Đại Quốc Khuyển (lit. Four Great National Dogs). These are: Bắc Hà dog, Lài dog(Scientific name: Canis lupus dingo), Hmong bobtail dog, and Phú Quốc Ridgeback.

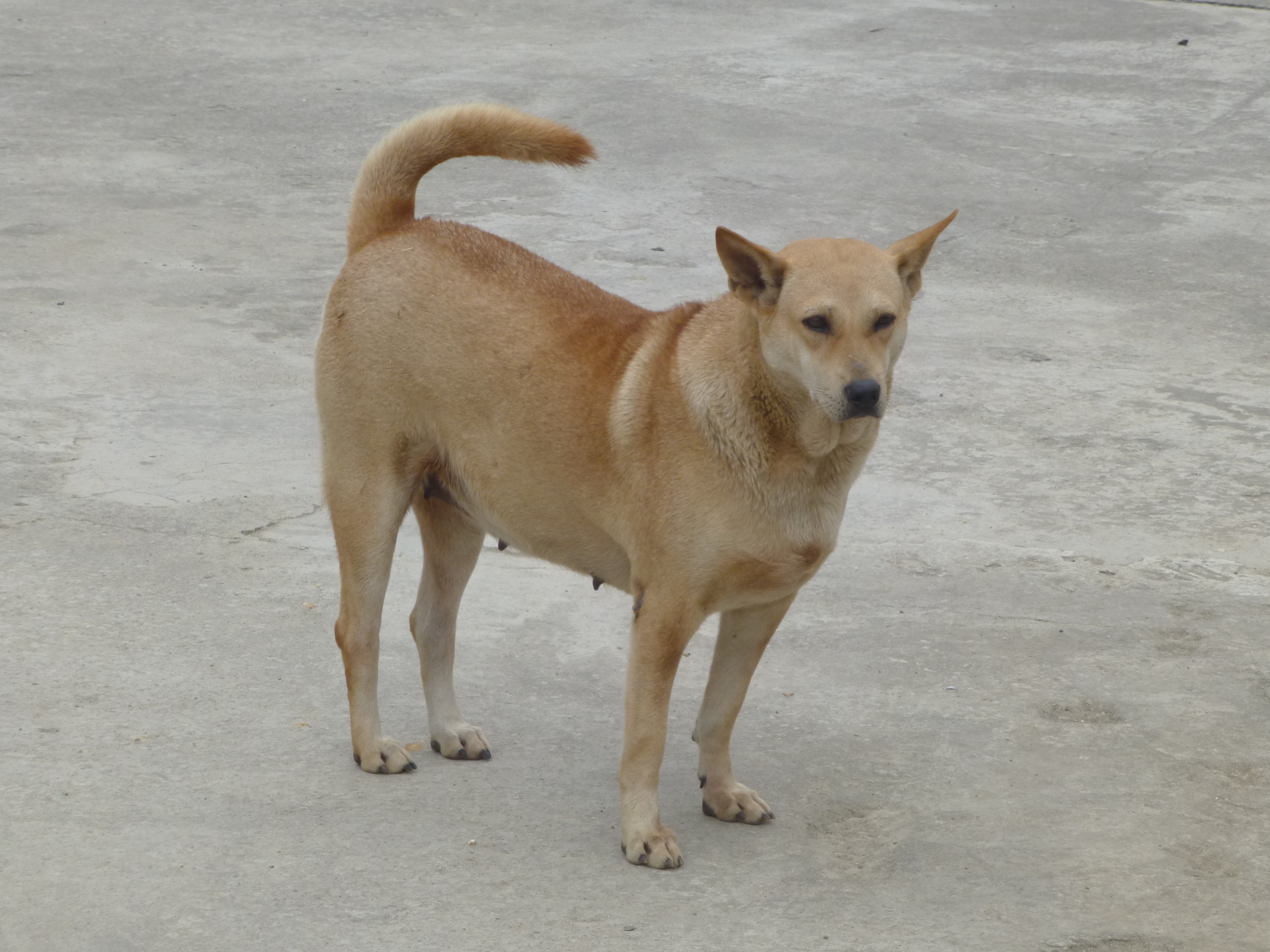
A Cỏ dog in Lào Cai, Vietnam.

These Cỏ breeds have existed in Vietnam and in other parts of Mainland Southeast Asia for more than 6000 years, where it has lived alongside and bonded with the local people. As a result, Cỏ dog has left a deep imprint into the historical and cultural depictions of dogs in Vietnam, from small villages to major cities. One example of such cultural impact is the spiritual practice of praying to Cỏ dogs' statues performed by some Vietnamese. Cỏ dogs are seen as loyal creatures. They are usually raised in their owners' homes, where they can function as the houses' guardians against intruders (via barking or biting). Cỏ dogs can also be trained to hunt.

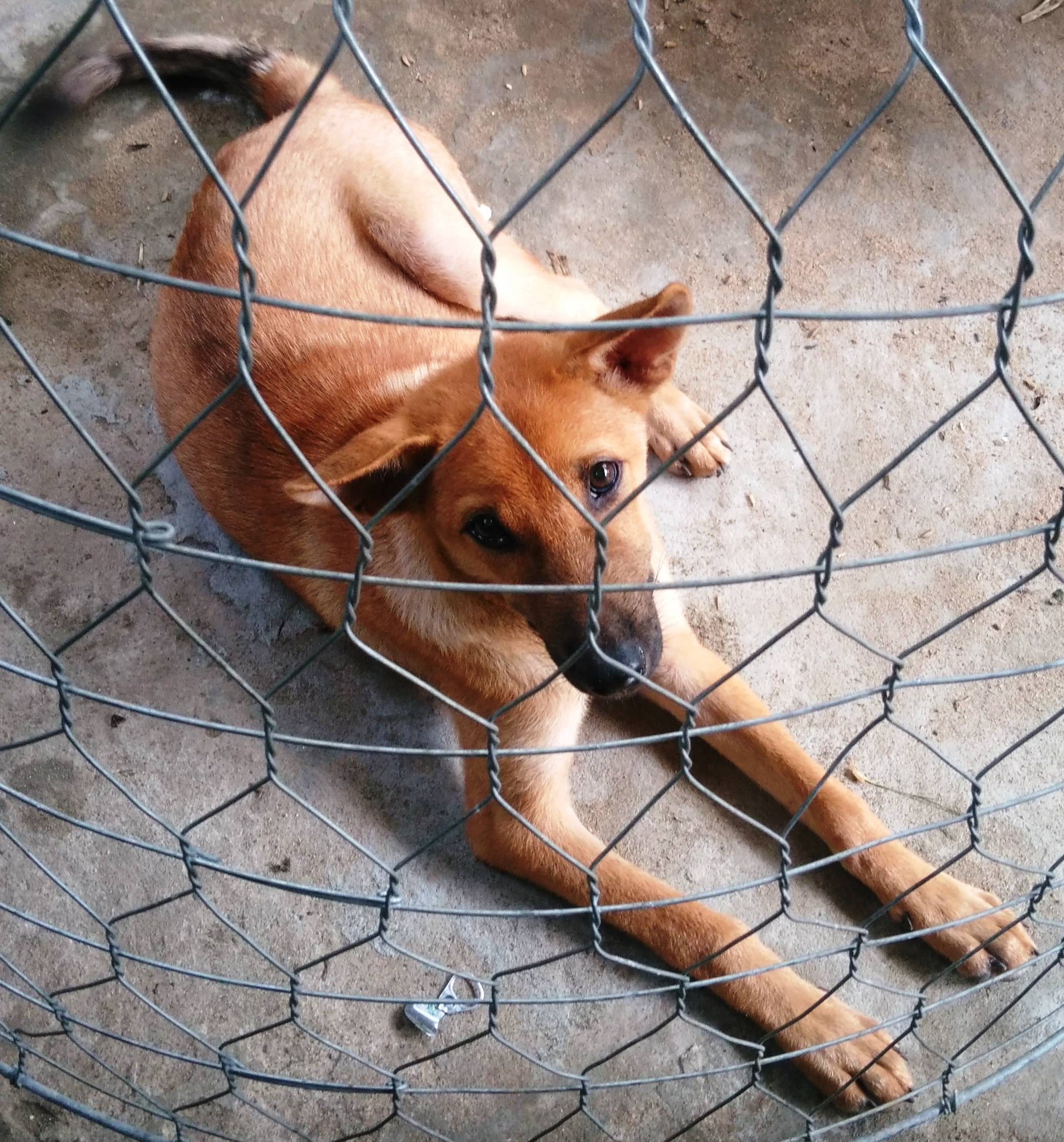
A black-nosed Cỏ dog in Vietnam.

One of the Tứ Đại Quốc Khuyển dogs, the Lài dog, is indigenous to the Northern Midland and Mountainous Regions of Vietnam. It is currently being raised by the Vietnamese hill people, who scatter the breed all across the Vietnamese territory where major rivers flow. Lài dogs are also not considered a distinct breed by any national (Vietnamese Kennel Club) nor international kennel club but rather a landrace. Today, they are at risk of extinction because their genes are not conserved. Similarly, none of the Tứ Đại Quốc Khuyển breeds are recognised by major, international kennel clubs.

== Names ==
The term "chó cỏ" in Chữ Nôm.

Cỏ dog goes by several names in Vietnam, where the noun chó in the Vietnamese Language refers to dog. These names are (but not limited to):

- Chó cỏ (Chữ Nôm: 㹥𦹯): Literally grass dog. It is likely that Cỏ dog is called as such because of its common occurrence in grassy rural areas where it coexisted with the Vietnamese people back then.
- Chó ta (㹥些, IPA: [t͡ɕɔː˧˥ taː˧]): Literally our dog to refer to the Vietnamese people's dog.
- Chó nội (㹥內, [t͡ɕɔː˧˥ no˧ˀ˩]): Literally inner dog or native dog to differentiate it from foreign dog breeds (chó ngoại).
- Chó nhà (㹥茹, [t͡ɕɔː˧˥ ɲaː˨˩]): Literally house dog, though this term may also refer to any dog that is used to guard its owner's house in general.
- Chó Việt Nam (㹥越南, [t͡ɕɔː˧˥ viət˧ˀ˩ naːm˧]) or Vietnamese dog.
- Chó dé ([t͡ɕɔː˧˥ zɛː˧˥]).

Many terms are also used to refer to Cỏ dogs with specific features, such as:

- Chó mực (㹥墨, [t͡ɕɔː˧˥ mɯk˧ˀ˩]): Literally ink dog (not squid dog) to refer to Cỏ dogs with black fur, or (less commonly) black-furred dogs in general.
- Chó vện (㹥綄, [t͡ɕɔː˧˥ ven˧ˀ˩]): Literally brindled dog to refer to Cỏ dogs with tiger-like stripes (brindled).

== Features ==
=== Appearance ===
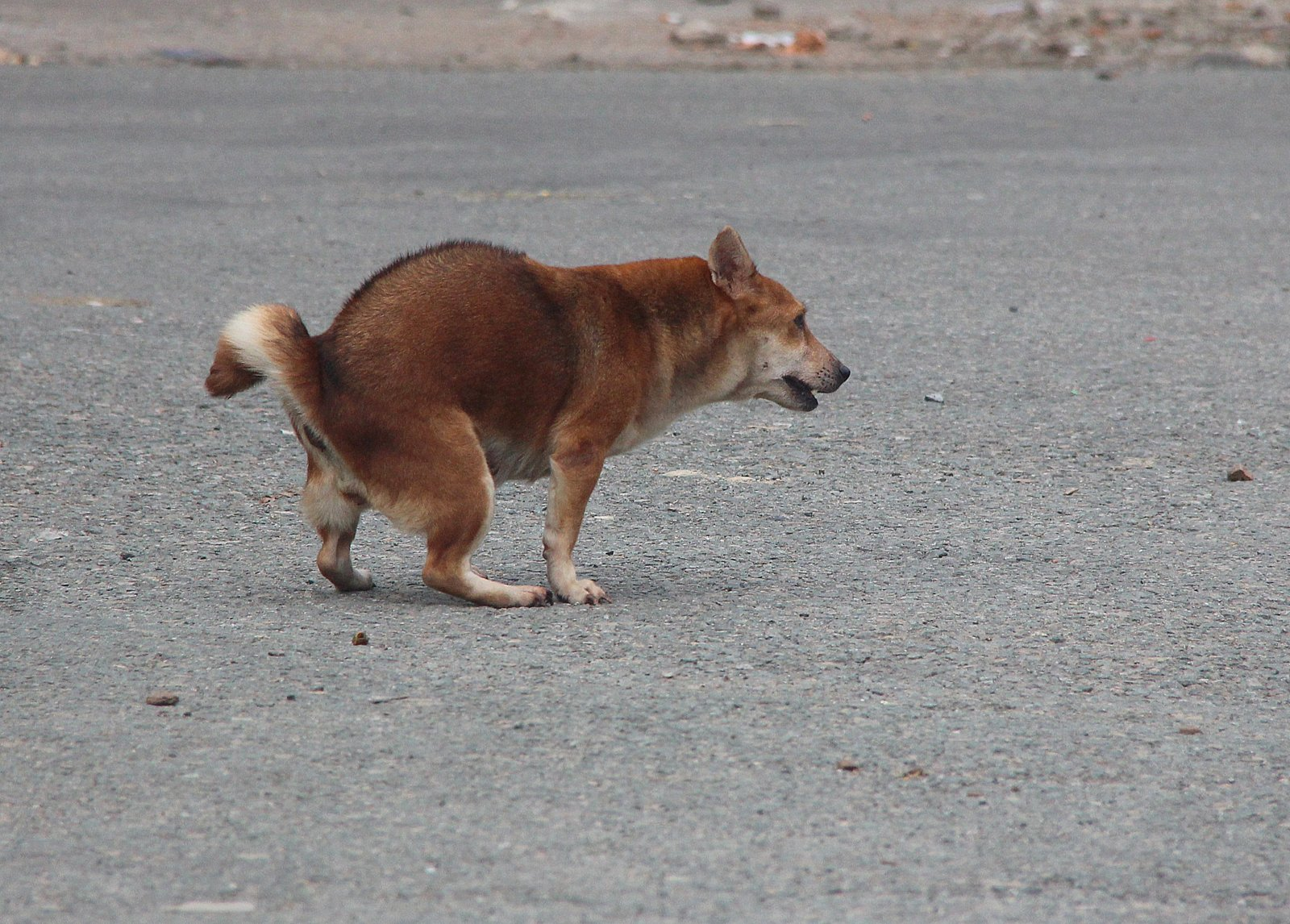
A Cỏ dog in Vietnam.

Generally, Cỏ dogs are relatively small to medium-sized, weighing from around 14 to 20 kilograms as adults. The Lài dogs in particular are medium-sized, weighing from 12 to 20 kilograms and are from 45 to 65 centimetres in height (measured from the ground to the dog's shoulder's peaks). Cỏ dogs' backs are straight and their bellies are flat. At a 1.2:1 ratio, a Cỏ dog's horizontal body length is only slightly longer compared to its vertical height. Male Cỏ dogs are usually bigger than female ones. A feature that makes a purebred Cỏ dog easily recognisable is its paws having white fur that resembles two pairs of white socks; its tail having a white tip that resembles a reed flower. A Cỏ dog's tail is neither too long nor too short, and is often relaxed and curved downwards when the dog rests. However, during activities, its tail will either be popped straight up vertically or be curved upwards and inwards, where it hovers above the dog's back.

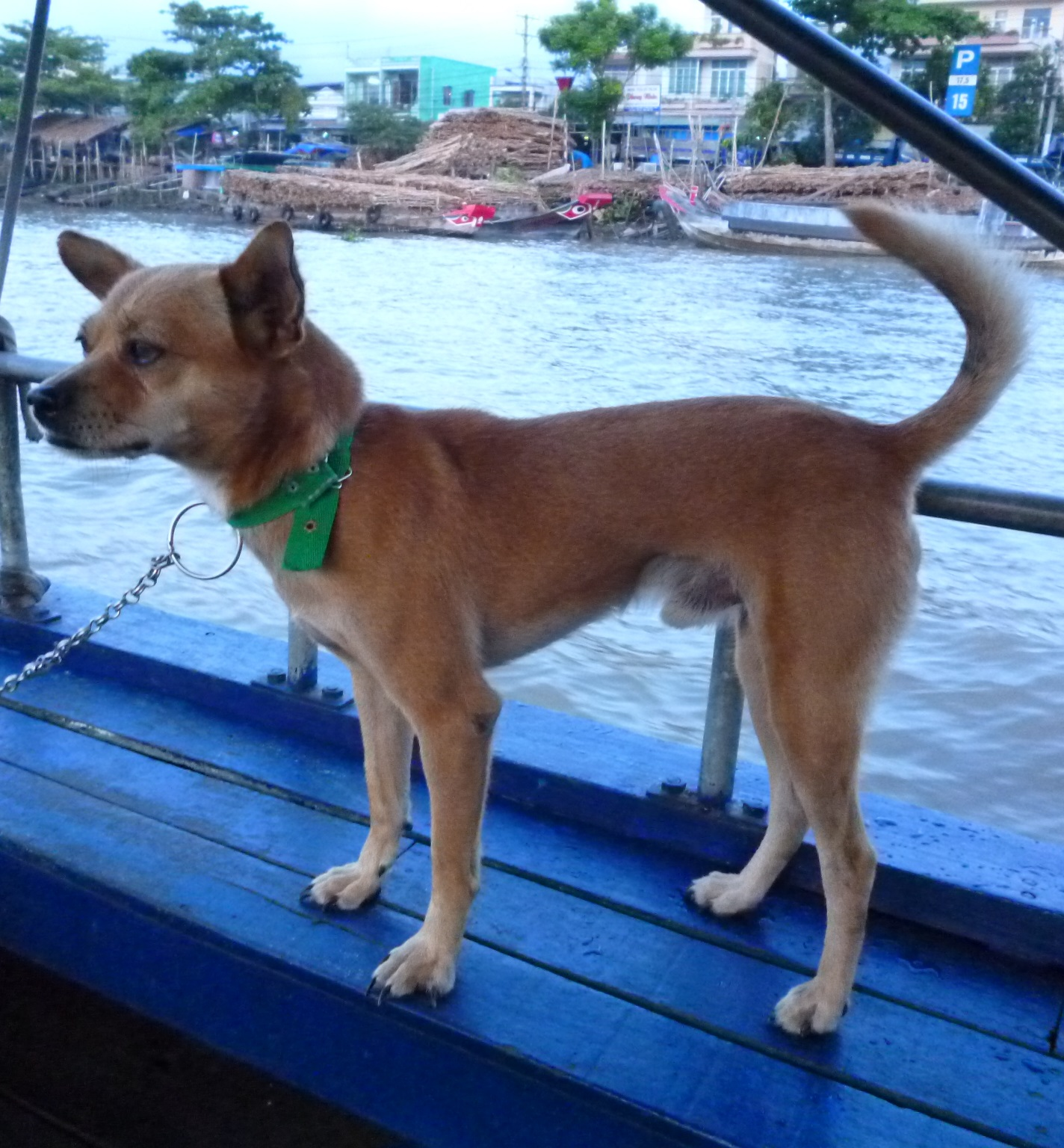
A common dog breed in Vietnam that is a result of purebred Cỏ dogs cross-breeding with foreign breeds.

The ratio of the horizontal length of a Cỏ dog's head's to its muzzle's length is 2:1. Its head is slender. Similar to a wolf's, Cỏ dog's face is triangular; its short V-shaped muzzle is slightly sharp and its stop is relatively wide. The dog's nose is black and its tongue is pink, and some Cỏ dogs can have black spots on its tongue. Its ears are located by its skull on two laterally opposite sides, each pointed forwards and straight upwards like a clam's shell, perpendicular to its skull's top when viewed from the front. Also, the ears are not very big and do they not have much hair inside. Some common fur colours are fiery red, white, jet black (chó mực), grey, brown, spotted, or tiger-like striped (chó vện).

=== Behaviour ===
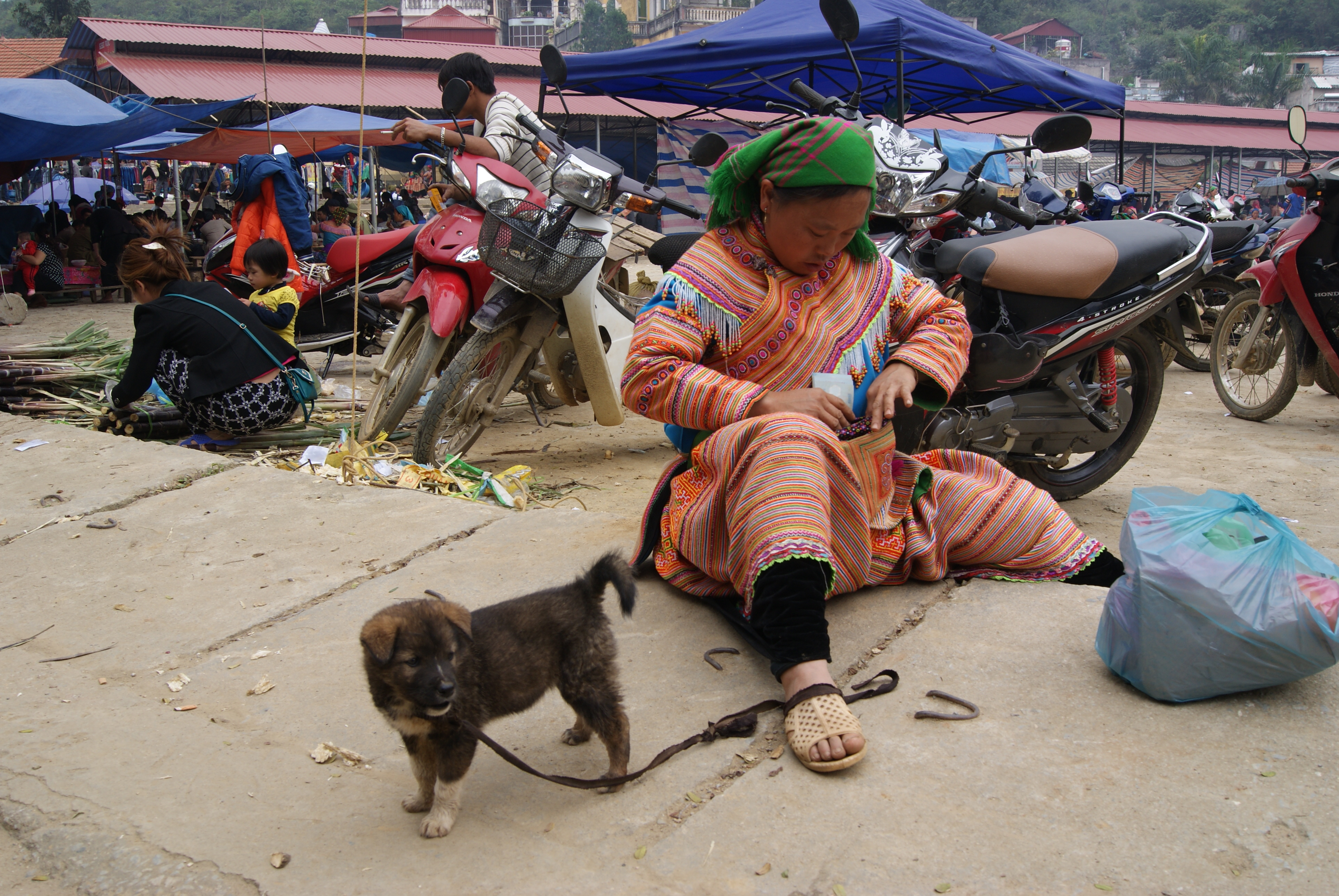
A Bắc Hà dog.

Most Cỏ dogs lead an ordinary life, primarily consisting of eating, sleeping, and roaming. Some are trained to be hunting dogs. Buyers of hunting dogs prioritise strong, angry-looking ones with small ears and a good ability to track its prey's scent. Despite their small physique, their ability to hunt is rather admirable. Boars hunters often bring along at least 3 Cỏ hunting dogs every hunt. When the leader of a pack detects a prey, it will immediately alert its owner and other members of the pack to start the chase. However, Cỏ hunting dogs can sometimes be knocked down by wild animals such as boars, which can result in death or serious injuries for the dog. Often, such instances happen because the dog is too reckless when attacking a big prey head-on.

Cỏ dogs, similar to many other dog breeds in Vietnam, have an especially great fear for tigers. When they scent a tiger within the one-kilometre radius, they become extremely wary and stop tracking the source any further at once, while trying to stay close to their owners. This is rather helpful because, for instance, people living in the Mekong Delta can be alerted of tigers nearby by observing their dogs curving their tails downwards while appearing extremely fearful; actions such as evacuating themselves and the dogs can thus be taken before it is too late. Tigers often intentionally venture into villages to hunt Cỏ dogs as prey. When a tiger appears (within observable distance), Cỏ dogs would rush to hide under the beds, obscure corners, or even under the floor's tiles. All the dogs would be dead silent, lest get caught, killed and dragged into the woods where it would be the tiger's dinner.

=== Health ===
Generally, Cỏ dogs are very unlikely to get sick (only 20%) because of their strong immune system. The Lài dog in particular can and often live up to 20 years, but little scientific research has been done for them due to their growing scarcity.

== Some breeds/landraces of Cỏ ==
=== Lài dog ===
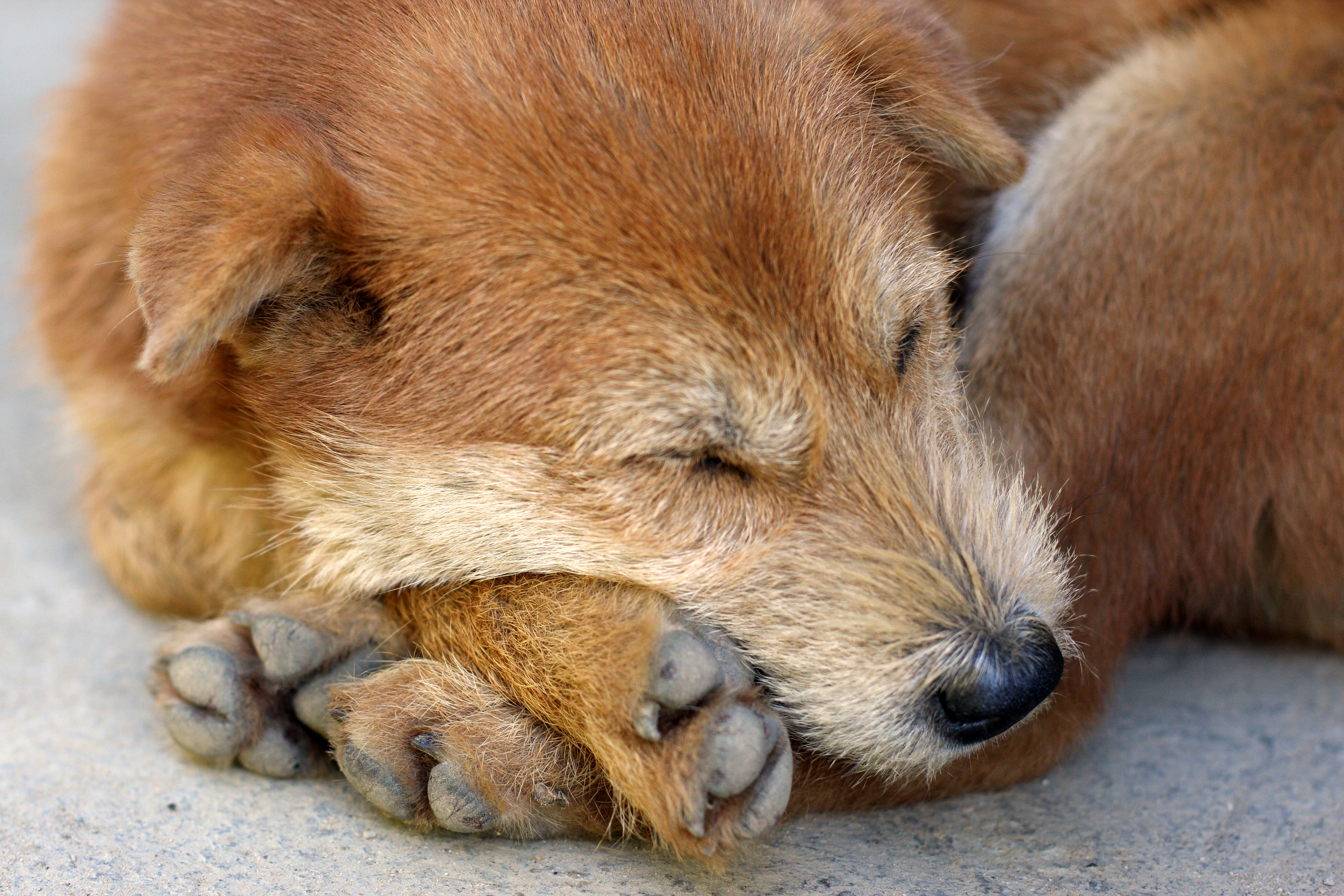
A Cỏ dog in Sapa, Vietnam.

The Lài dog is indigenous to the Northern Midland and Mountainous Regions of Vietnam. Lài dogs often have long bodies, long muzzle, big legs, and long tails. Their fur can be yellow with traces of black or just pure black. Adult ones can weigh up to 40 kg or even 60 kg. They are known to be intelligent hunters; they can track odour really well and are very strong and fierce.

Some theories were made to explain their origin. The Hmong people believe that the Lài dog is a result of Hmong domesticated dogs breeding with wild wolves. Thus, they called the new dogs "Lai" (not "Lài") because the word "lai" means "cross-bred" in Vietnamese. Due to regional differences in pronunciation, the original name "Lai" (with the Vietnamese level tone [˧]) eventually became "Lài" (with the falling tone [˨˩]), giving birth to the name Lài dog. Other people however believe that the Lài dog is actually a result of foreign European dogs breeding with Vietnamese wild wolves. When the French arrived in Vietnam, they bred the wolves with the dogs that they had brought from France, creating several different descending breeds, but most of them no longer exist except the Lài.

In Lào Cai province, there are also Y Tý (Note: IPA: [i˧ ti˧˥]) dogs, each as big as a calf, weighing from 50 to 60 kilograms. An Y Tý dog is also as furry as a lion's mane. This breed is a result of European dogs, Cỏ dogs, and wolves cross-breeding. Generally, Y Tý dogs are not as smart as the Lài dogs.

=== Hmong bobtail dog ===
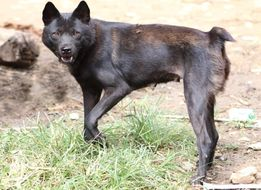
A Hmong bobtail.

The Hmong bobtail is a good hunting dog breed. The dogs are exceptionally intelligent and they possess great stamina. Appearance-wise, a Hmong bobtail dog is very recognisable for its incredibly muscular-looking physique but a very tiny tail, if it even has one, that is rather silly—hence the name. Its fang has 6 to 8 distinct edges (a feature seen in many ancient hunting dogs that aids in grabbing their preys tightly and tearing chewy meat). Its two triangular ears are always upright. Even when it lies rest, its hind limbs are always in ready position, waiting to strike. Hmong bobtail dogs are stubborn yet they tend to not bite people, and they only follow their owners' commands.

To the Hmong people, the Hmong bobtail dog has always been one of their favourite animals and is seen as "treasure". Almost all Hmong bobtail owners use them only for hunting and to guard their homes against intruders. However, because the act of hunting wild animals in the woods is no longer common, the dogs only serve as their owners' homes' guardians now for the most part.

== Abnormal instances ==
Cỏ dogs very rarely give birth to more than 10 puppies in one gestation. However, in Quảng Nam province, Vietnam, one grey female Cỏ dog with white belly, weighing nearly 10 kg, gave birth to 11 puppies in one gestation. This is not the first time that this particular dog had given birth to a litter of more than 10. The previous three gestation had also given birth to many, ranging from 9 to 10 puppies each. This eleven-puppy patch however is the mother dog's record but sadly, two of them died competing for breast milk. Among the nine remaining puppies, only one has grey fur; the rest are gloss black. Their weights are all similar to one another, with the average being more than 0.5 kg at the time of birth. Another rare instance involving Cỏ dogs is in Vĩnh Thanh commune, Phước Long ward, Bạc Liêu (now Cà Mau) province, Vietnam, where one Cỏ dog "babysat" 5 rats, each around 3 months old. It is said that while catching rats in a farm field, one person brought back a few baby rats that were not even able to open their eyes yet due to their extremely young age. Unexpectedly, his female Cỏ dog was very interested in the baby rats and started raising them as her own puppies from then on.

Vietnam also witnesses an instance of male Cỏ dog giving birth in Hưng Yên Bắc (Now Yên Trung) commune, Hưng Nguyên town, Nghệ An province. A near seven-year-old male Cỏ dog—whose name was Đen meaning "black" in Vietnamese because its fur was black—went into labour and gave birth. It was very easy to realise that the male dog somehow managed to get himself a tiny hole near his genital where he was able to push the baby out. After the incidence, Đen's belly was still observably bloated. Upon touching its belly area, one could sense there were many little "balls" in its stomach, so it was possible that there were still some puppies that had yet to be given birth to. This special dog can also change its eyes' colour. One blink and its eyes can change from blue to black. Its owner claims that Đen's eyes can also change whenever it barked or when it was infuriated.
