= Ridgeback =

Ridgeback may refer to:

== Companies ==
- Ridgeback (brand), a British bicycle brand
- Ridgeback Resources, a Calgary, Alberta-based private oil exploration and production company
- Ridgeback Biotherapeutics

== Dogs ==
- Phu Quoc Ridgeback, a breed from Phu Quoc Island, Vietnam
- Rhodesian Ridgeback, a breed indigenous to Southern Africa
- Thai Ridgeback, a breed originating from Thailand

== See also ==
- Cougar (MRAP), a variant of which is the Ridgback PPV (Protected Patrol Vehicle)
