= Ridge, Texas =

Ridge, Texas may refer to:

- Ridge, Mills County, Texas
- Ridge, Robertson County, Texas
