= Ridge House =

Ridge House may refer to:

- Ridge House, a student cooperative house in Berkeley, California
- Ridge House (Fayetteville, Arkansas)

== See also ==
- The Ridge (disambiguation)
