= Phu Quoc Ridgeback =

Vietnamese breed of dog

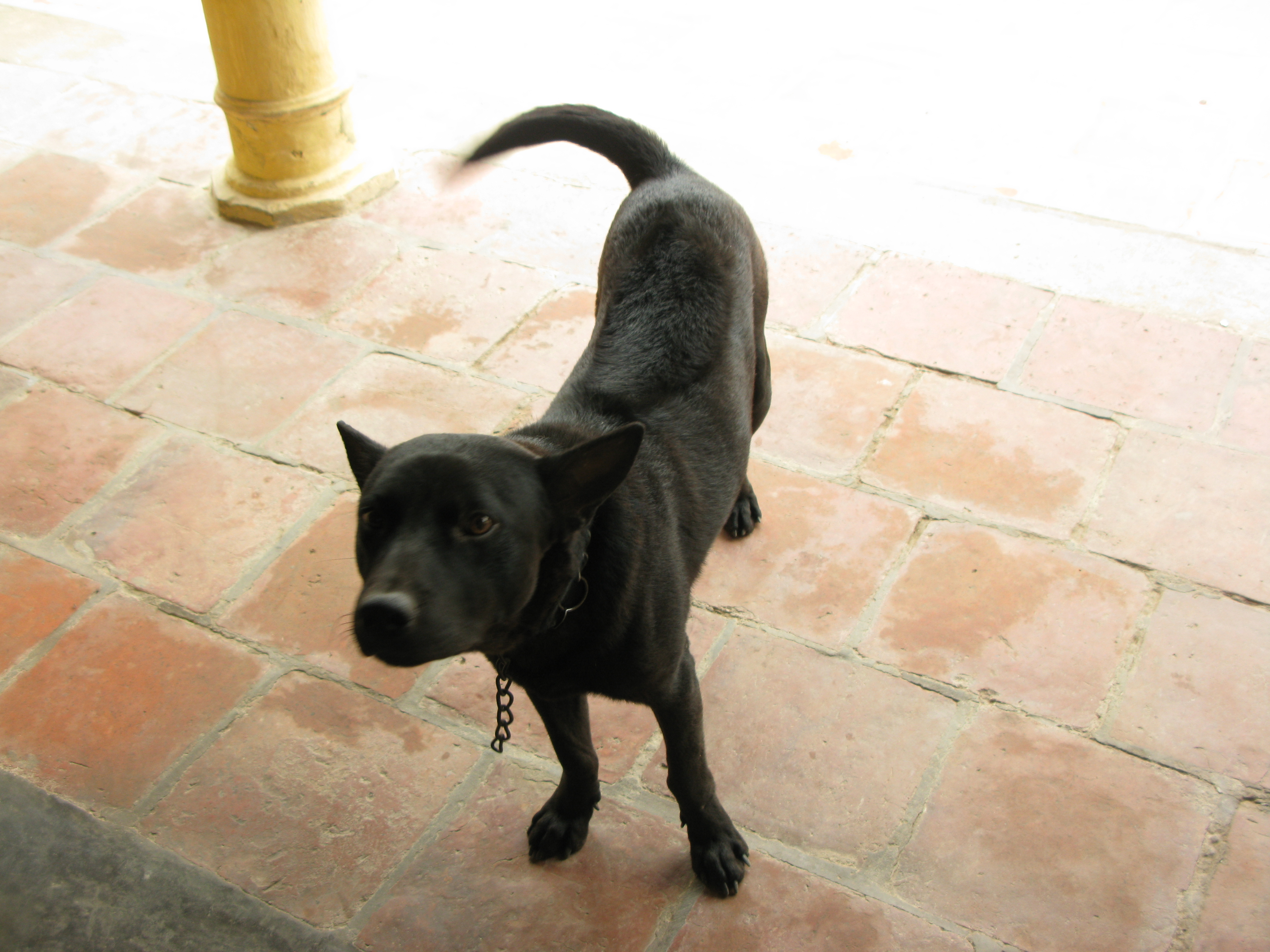
- Origin: Vietnam
Traits
Height	Males	50–55 cm (19.5–21.5 in)
	Females	48–52 cm (19–20.5 in)
Weight	Males	15–20 kg (33–44 lb)
	Females	12–18 kg (26–40 lb)
Kennel club standards
- Vietnam Kennel Association: standard

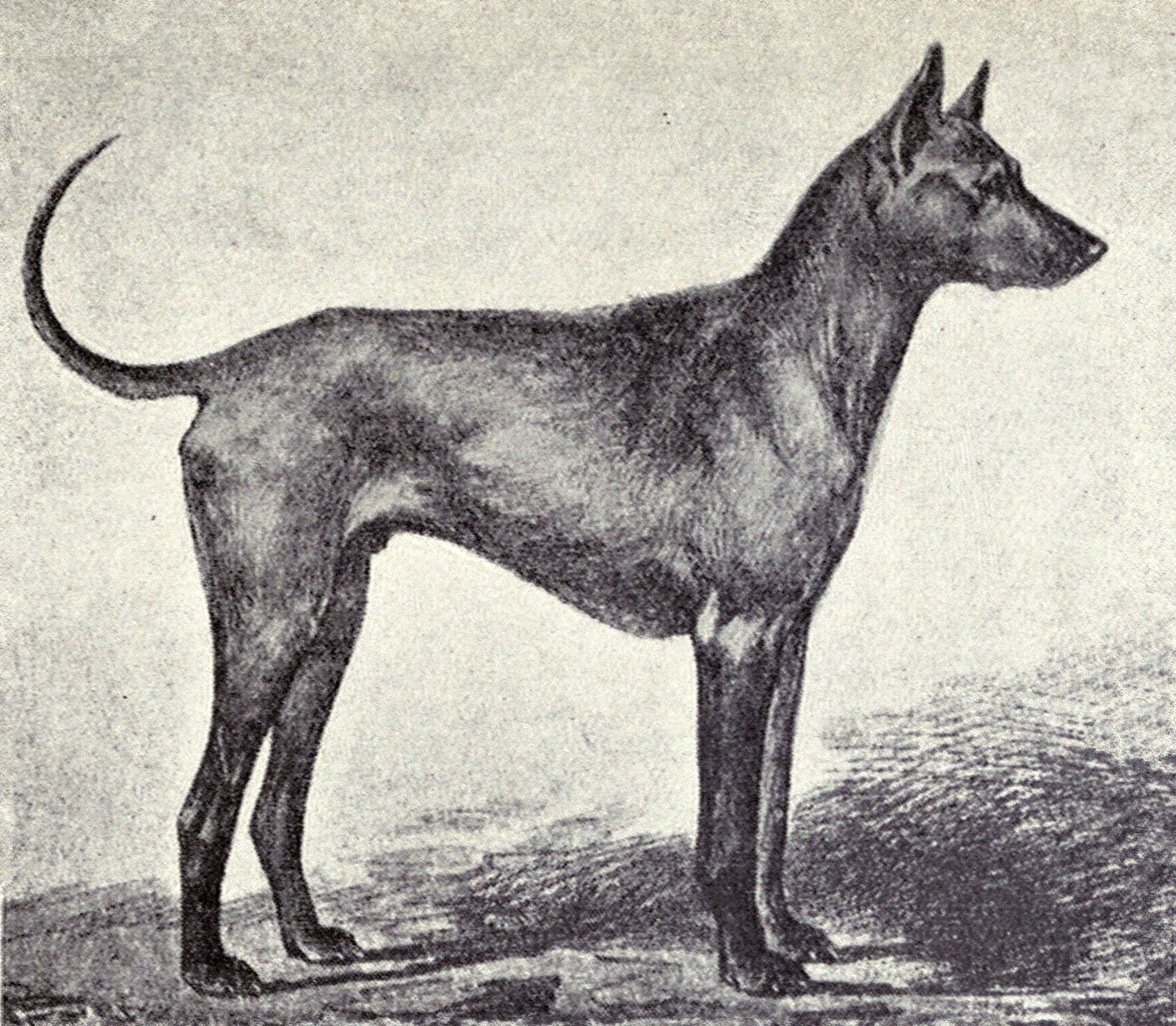
Phu Quoc Ridgeback circa 1915, then known as the Phu-Quoc Greyhound

The Phu Quoc Ridgeback (Vietnamese: Chó Phú Quốc) is a rare breed of dog from the island of Phú Quốc in Kiên Giang Province in southern Vietnam. It is one of three ridgeback breeds, the others being the Rhodesian Ridgeback and the Thai Ridgeback. It is not recognized by the Fédération Cynologique Internationale or any other major club. The Phu Quoc Ridgeback is one of the four native Vietnamese dog breeds, along with the Bắc Hà dog (Chó Bắc Hà), Lài dog (chó lài), and the Hmong Bobtail Dog (chó H’Mông cộc đuôi).

== History ==
There is considerable debate as to exactly when and how the breed arrived to the island of Phú Quốc. The breed was originally a landrace developed as a semi-feral companion to hunt for food and guard the homes of native islanders. French colonists recognized the distinct dogs as a unique breed in the 19th century, and two resided at the Jardin d’Acclimitation in Paris. Historically, Phu Quoc Ridgebacks were not purposefully bred, instead relying on random pairings in the relative isolation of island life to continue to maintain their unique population. According to native Phú Quốc islanders, there were originally three sizes of the breed, each uniquely bred to hunt different sizes of game over different terrains. Unfortunately, purebred examples became scarce after the introduction of non-native dogs to the island, with many French writers noting that the breed was near extinction by the turn of the 20th century.

Despite the near extinction, genetic studies indicate that the Phu Quoc Ridgeback population is genetically diverse. It was commonly thought that the Phu Quoc Ridgeback derives from the Thai Ridgeback, but recent research suggests otherwise. According to a genetic analysis, the Phu Quoc Ridgeback is most closely related to Korea's Pungsan dog. The breed population has been resurging as public interest grows. A Phu Quoc Ridgeback won the Hanoi dog show in 2013. The breed was selected as the mascot for the 2018 annual Nguyen Hue Flower Street in Ho Chi Minh City, symbolizing the lunar Year of the Dog as per the Vietnamese zodiac.

=== Awards ===
On December 6, 2009, in the "National Beautiful Dog Contest 2009" held for the first time in Vietnam, the Phu Quoc dog won second prize when competing with various dog breeds from Vietnam and around the world.

On July 5, 2011, the Phu Quoc dog was taken to Paris for the first time to participate in the FCI World Dog Show 2011 - the world's beautiful dog competition in 2011. [2] At this event, the Phu Quoc dog won the CACS prize (world-level certificate for beautiful dogs, also known as the "Phu Quoc World Champion 2011"). However, the Phu Quoc dog was given special permission to participate but could not compete for the top world prize as it was not listed in the FCI's official list of dog breeds.

== Description ==
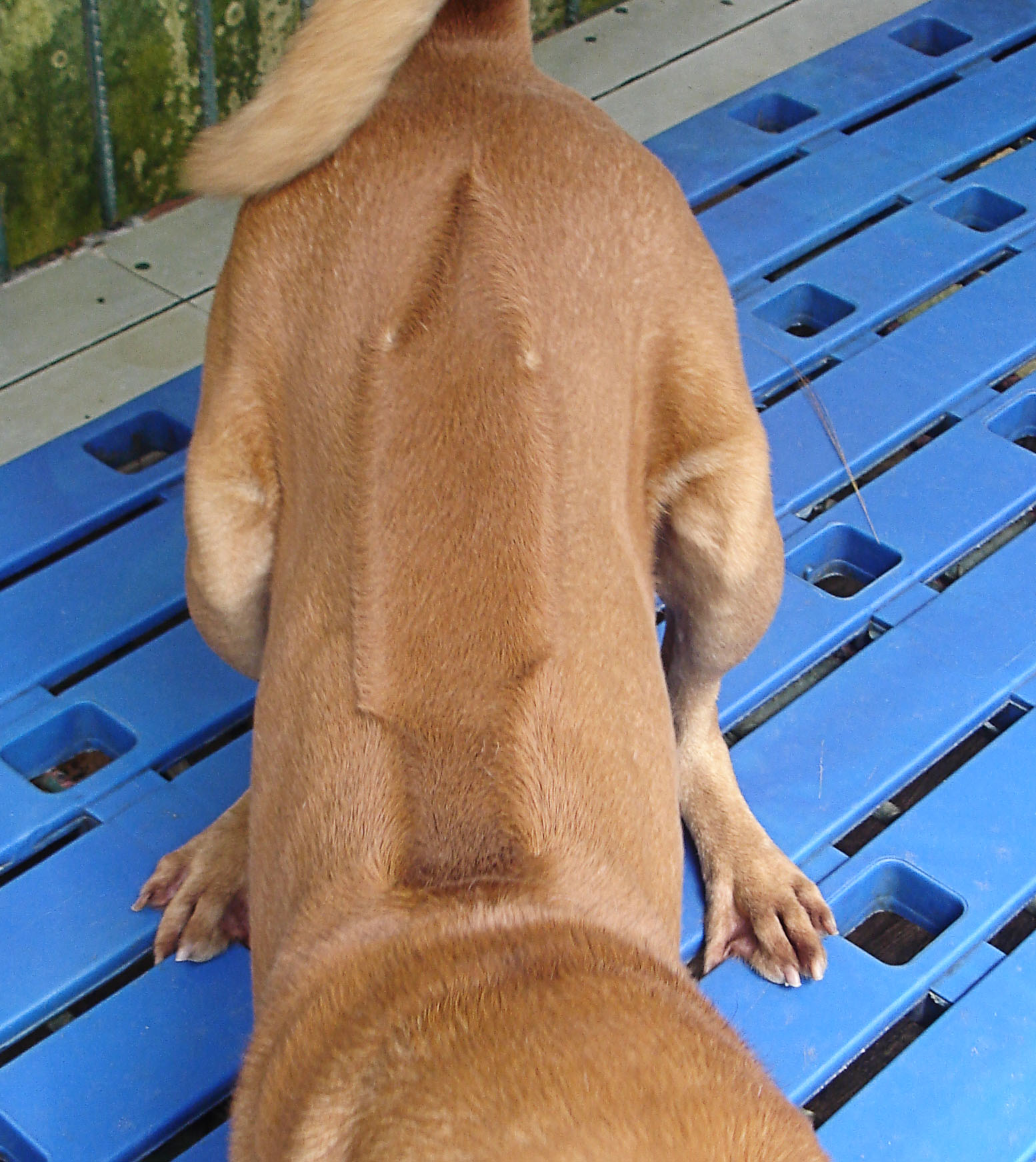
The characteristic dorsal ridge on a Phu Quoc Ridgeback

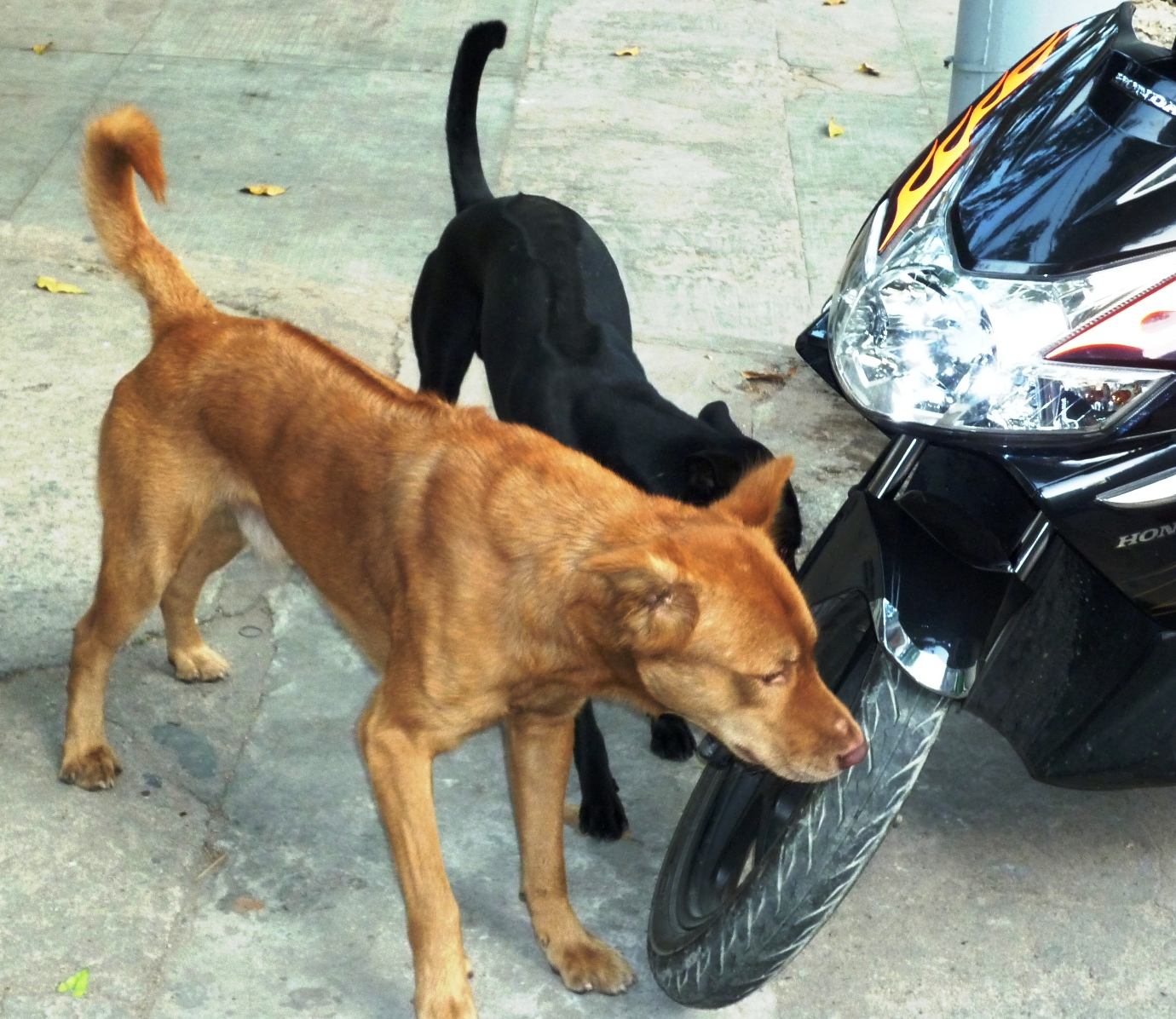
A pair of Phu Quoc Ridgeback dogs

Medium sized with a hound shape, but with a larger head and well-developed muscles, the Phu Quoc Ridgeback is genetically and morphologically different from the Thai Ridgeback. All or part of the Phu Quoc's tongue is blue in color and the feet are webbed. Phu Quoc Ridgebacks are prized for their ability to run fast, swim well, and follow either a hot or a cold trail. As hunting dogs, they are known for their versatility, working both individually and in packs to take down a variety of prey including mice, fish, deer, and water buffalo. They also make excellent camp dogs, alerting to intruders.

=== Dorsal ridge ===
The dorsal ridge on Phu Quoc Ridgebacks is described by shape, of which there are 5 main shapes: music note, sword, saddle, half-saddle, and arrow-shaped. The ridgeback phenomenon develops when the neural tube forms in embryogenesis, leading to the characteristic hair follicle orientation.

== Folklore ==
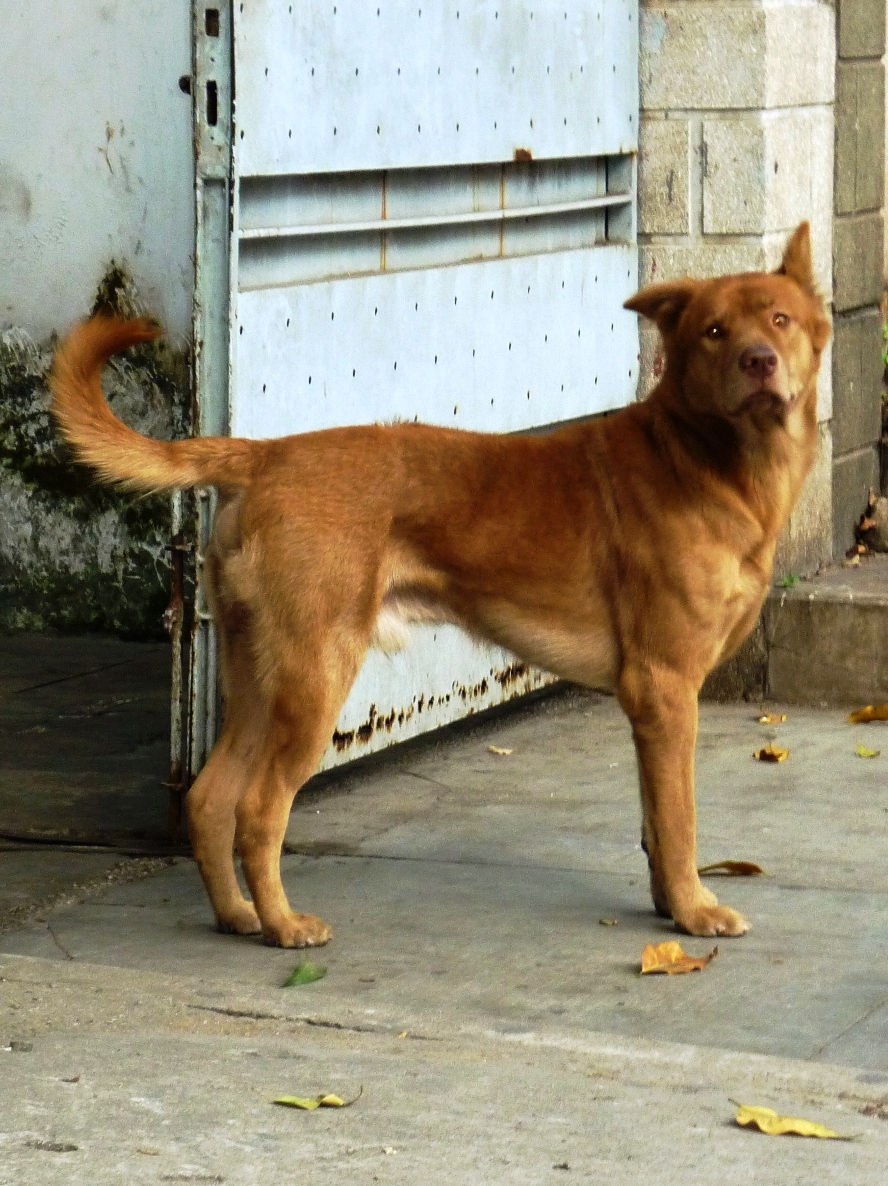

In Vietnamese folklore, the Phu Quoc dog is considered the "royal canine" because in history, there were four Phu Quoc dogs that were officially recognized by King Gia Long in a solemn ceremony, not inferior to the noble titles bestowed upon the founding heroes of the Nguyen Dynasty.

The four Phu Quoc dogs (two males and two females) were raised by King Gia Long and accompanied him throughout his journeys. In the book "Nguyen Phuc royal genealogy and pedigree explanation," a hereditary book that records and explains everything related to the royal family, detailed information about these four dogs is described, not only their achievements but also their distinctive characteristics as Phu Quoc dogs. These Phu Quoc dogs saved King Gia Long from danger twice before his ascension to the throne. They helped him escape the pursuit of the Tây Sơn army and ensured his safety.

After ascending the throne, King Gia Long, when bestowing titles and rewards to his generals, did not forget to confer an honorary title upon the four Phu Quoc dogs: "Cứu khổn phò nguy Tá quốc huân thần Thần khuyển đại tướng quân", which translates to "The Great General of Divine Dogs, who saved the nation and assisted the king during times of peril." When the four dogs died, the king had them buried and established a majestic temple to honor them.
