= Ridge Township =

Ridge Township may refer to:

- Ridge Township, Shelby County, Illinois
- Ridge Township, Barber County, Kansas
- Ridge Township, Dickinson County, Kansas
- Ridge Township, Carroll County, Missouri
- Ridge Township, Van Wert County, Ohio
- Ridge Township, Wyandot County, Ohio
