= The Ridge =

The Ridge may refer to:

- The Ridge, later Major Ridge, a Cherokee Indian leader
- The Ridge (TV series), a 2025 British and New Zealand serial

The Ridge may refer to the following places:

== Australia ==
- The Ridge, Newcastle, a heritage-listed residence and former hospital at 21 Hillcrest Road, Merewether, New South Wales

== United States ==
- The Ridge (Ridgeville, Georgia), an unincorporated community
- The Ridge (Derwood, Maryland), listed on the NRHP in Maryland
- The Ridge (Manchester, Ohio), listed on the NRHP in Ohio
- The Ridge at Danbury, an office complex
- The Ridge Motorsports Park, racing circuit in Shelton, Washington
- The Ridge (company) - accessories manufacturer

== India ==
- Delhi Ridge, a forested ridge in Delhi, India that shields the city of Delhi from desert winds from Rajasthan
