= The Ridge, Newcastle =

The Ridge
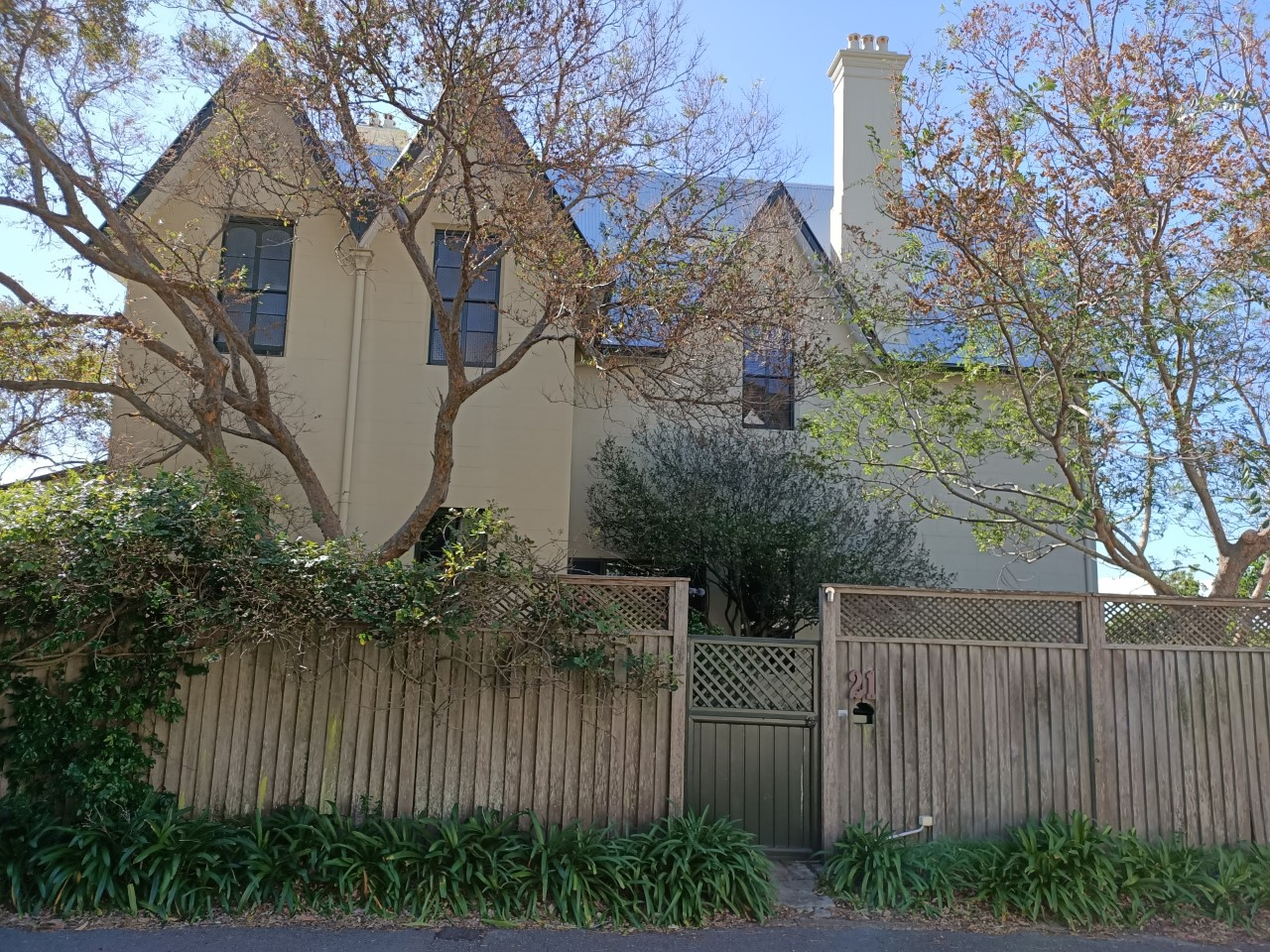
- The Ridge or Hillcrest Hospital in Merewether

- Location within New South Wales Location within Australia
- 32.9494°S 151.7504°E
- Location: 21 Hillcrest Road, Merewether, New South Wales, Australia

New South Wales Heritage Register
- Official name: The Ridge; Hillcrest Hospital
- Type: state heritage (built)
- Designated: 2 April 1999
- Reference no.: 313
- Type: Hospital
- Category: Health Services

The Ridge is a heritage-listed residence and former hospital at 21 Hillcrest Road, Merewether, New South Wales, Australia. It was also known as Hillcrest Hospital. It was added to the New South Wales State Heritage Register on 2 April 1999.

== History ==
The Ridge was built in 1861 by Edward Christopher Merewether, who had arrived in Newcastle as the General Superintendent of the Australian Agricultural Company, and his wife, whose family owned two land grants in the area now known as Merewether.

It was later used as a maternity hospital owned by the Salvation Army, but fell into disuse by the late 1970s and, in the early 1980s, a development consortium applied to demolish the house. However the NSW government intervened by permanently protecting it with a permanent conservation order. It then passed into private ownership and has been restored by the owners.

== Description ==
The Ridge is one of the most historically significant buildings in Merewether for its associations with the Merewether family from 1861, and its subsequent use as a hospital by the Salvation Army. It has landmark qualities perched on the edge of the Merewether ridge, with its steeply pitched gable roof. At the beginning of the 21st century the house forms a visually prominent built form within an area now well known for its large modern mansions. It also has interiors of historical interest.

It was reported to be in excellent condition as at 16 November 2006.

== Heritage listing ==
The Ridge was listed on the New South Wales State Heritage Register on 2 April 1999.
