= Bắc Hà dog =

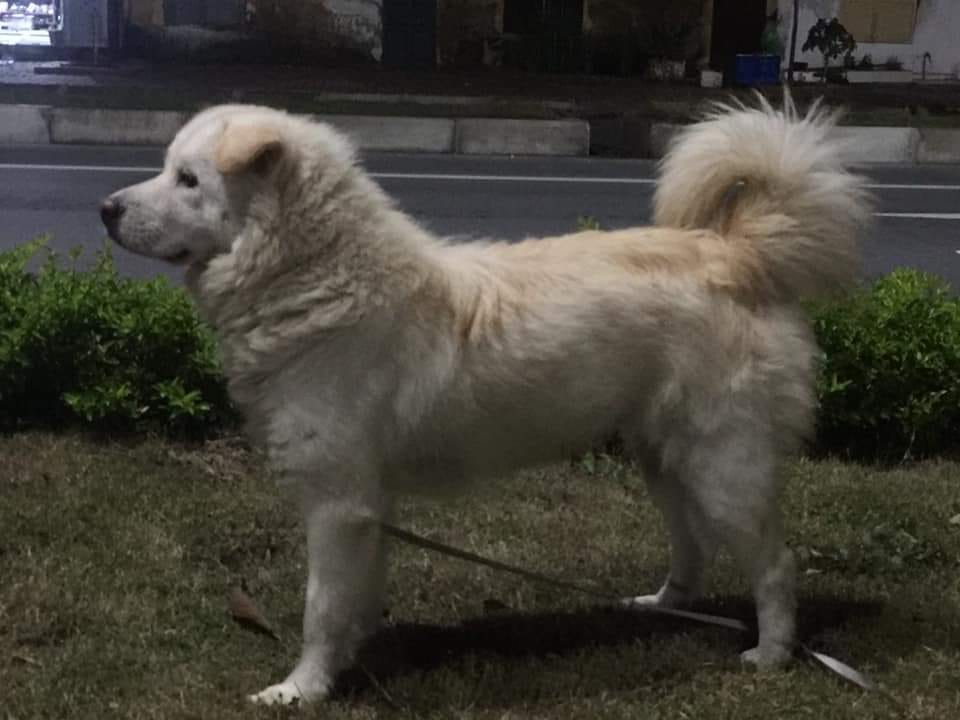
- Other names: Vietspitz
- Origin: Vietnam
Traits
Height	Males	52–58 cm (20–23 in)
	Females	50–56 cm (20–22 in)
Weight	Males	22–28 kg (49–62 lb)
	Females	18–24 kg (40–53 lb)
- Coat: Double
Kennel club standards
- Vietnam Kennel Association: standard

The Bắc Hà dog (Vietnamese: chó Bắc Hà) is a medium-size spitz dog breed and one of Vietnam's Four Great National Dogs (Vietnamese: tứ đại quốc khuyển). This primitive dog breed is primarily used a hunter and guard dog by the Hmong people in northern Vietnam, especially in the Bắc Hà district and Si Ma Cai district of Lào Cai province. While not recognized by the Fédération Cynologique Internationale, the Bắc Hà dog is recognized by the Vietnam Kennel Association.

== History ==
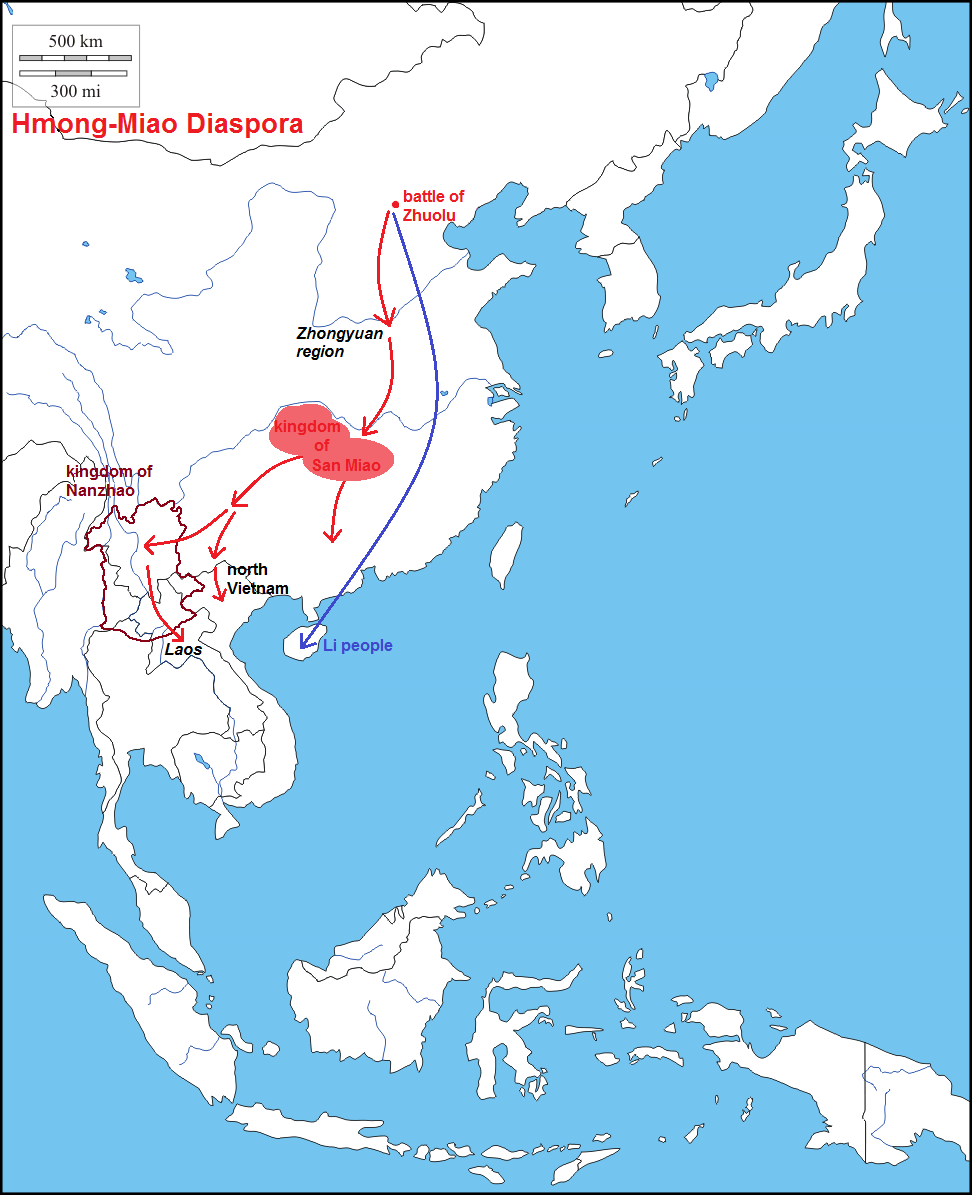
Hmong migration routes

While much of the Bắc Hà dog's history is speculative, they are thought to be descended from heavier-coated mountain dogs of southern China who accompanied the Hmong in their migration to Vietnam. Hmong traditions reports that the Hmong people themselves originated near the Yellow River region of China. The Hmong people were subjected to persecution and genocide by the Qing dynasty in the eighteenth and nineteenth centuries, and many fled to the mountains of northern Vietnam.

According to Hmong legend, after arriving to Lào Cai, a dhole came down from the mountains and mated with the female dogs, producing puppies with red fur and especially wild and fierce temperaments. These puppies were the first Bắc Hà dogs.

In October 2020, a Bắc Hà dog named Sói won the Vietnamese Native Breeds Championship Dog Show.

== Characteristics ==
=== Appearance ===
The bắc Hà is a medium-sized dog breed. An adult male dog is approximately 52–58 cm (20–23 in) tall at the shoulder and weighs about 22–28 kg (49–62 lb). Female dogs are usually smaller, about 50–56 cm (20–22 in) tall and weigh about 18–24 kg (40–53 lb). The bắc Hà has a large, round skull and a flat and broad forehead. The dog's ears are triangular, face down and wide at the base. Their eyes are almond-shaped, round and have thick rims. They are double coated, usually yellow brown, dark brown, black or white in color. The fur forms a mane around the neck and shoulders, and the tail is heavily feathered.

=== Behavior ===
Like other hunting and guarding breeds, the Bắc Hà is fiercely loyal and protective of their family members. They are highly intelligent and quick to pick up commands.

== Gallery ==
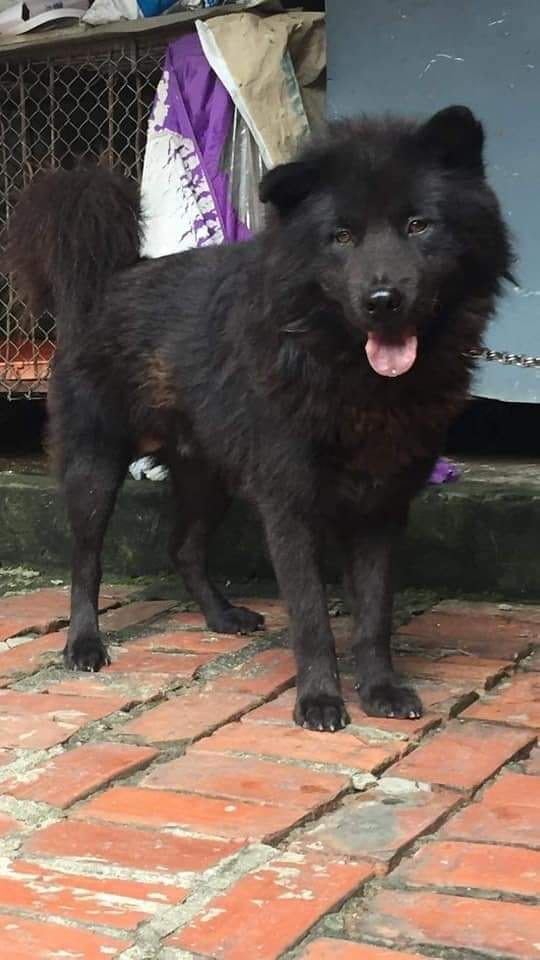
Bắc Hà dog with one ear up

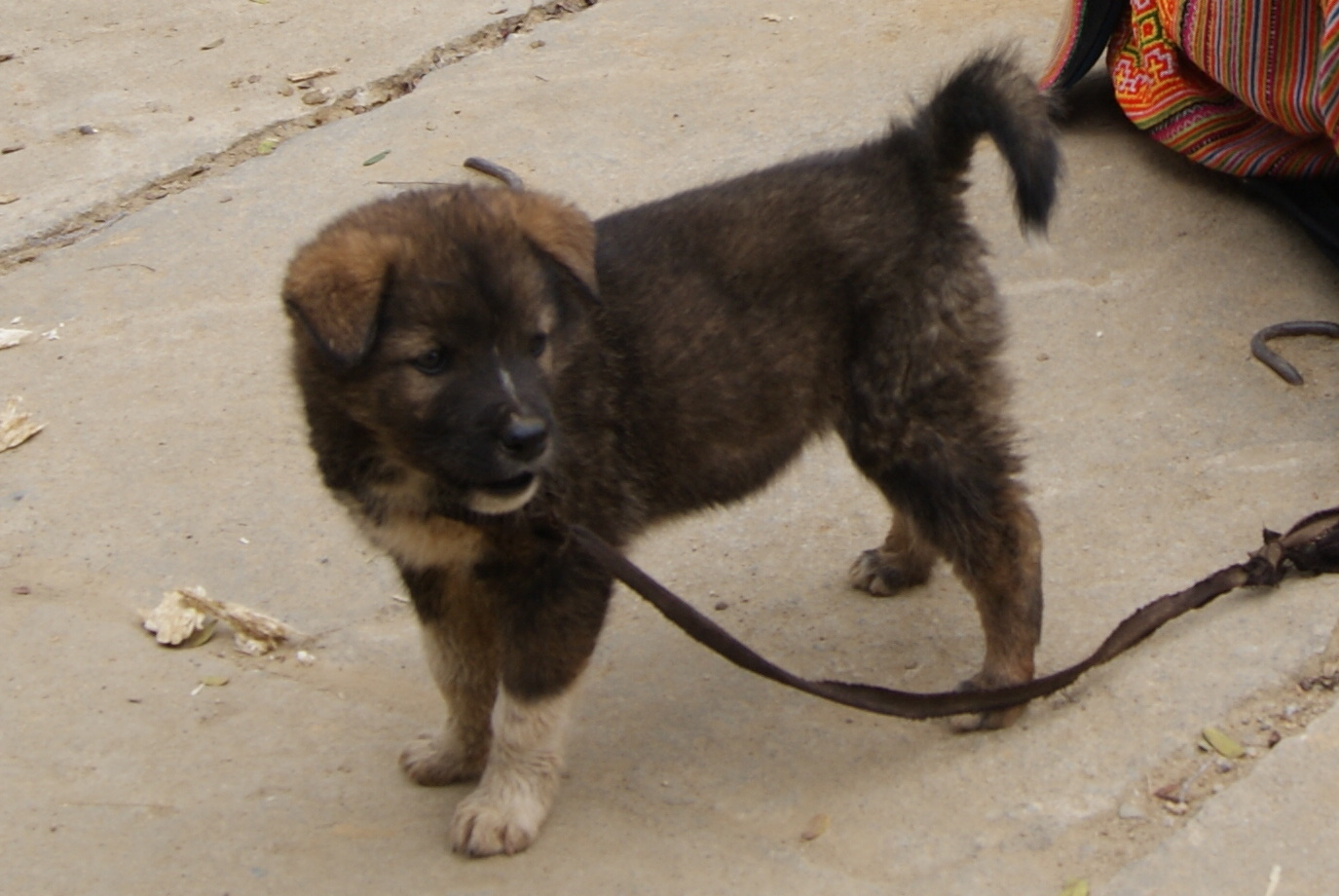
Bắc Hà puppy

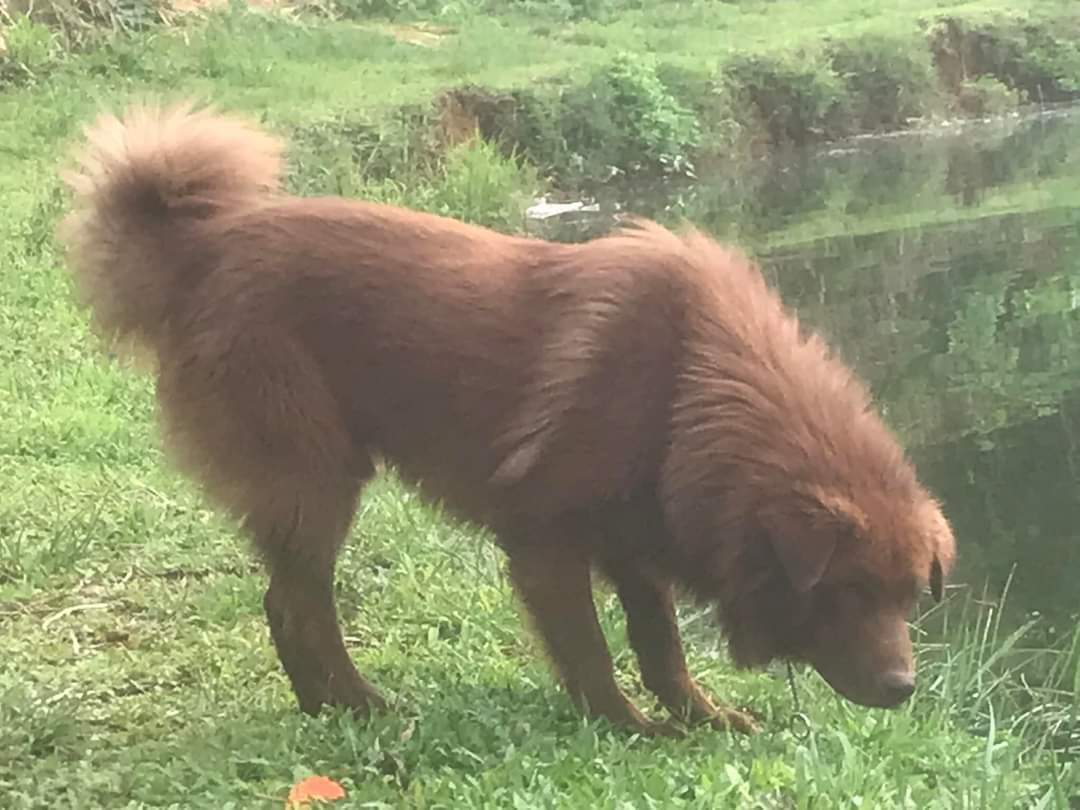
Brown Bắc Hà dog
