= Ridge, Mills County, Texas =

- Unincorporated community
- Location within Texas Location within the United States
- Coordinates: 31°28′51″N 98°47′48″W
- Country: United States
- State: Texas
- County: Mills
- Elevation: 1,480 ft (450 m)
- Time zone: UTC-6 (Central (CST))
  - Summer (DST): UTC-5 (CDT)
- Area code: 325
- GNIS feature ID: 2034988

Ridge (formerly, Cold Springs) is an unincorporated community in Mills County, Texas, United States. According to the Handbook of Texas, the community had a population of 25 in 2000.

== History ==
The area in what is known as Ridge today was first settled in the early 1890s. W.D. Aldridge named it when he opened a post office in his store and used the last five letters of his surname. The post office closed in 1915, after which mail was sent from Mullin. The community had a church and a cemetery in 1990 and 25 residents in 2000.

== Geography ==
Ridge is located at the intersection of Farm to Market Roads 573 and 574, 15 mi (24 km) west of Goldthwaite in far western Mills County.

== Education ==
Ridge had a school district in 1936. Today, the community is served by the Priddy Independent School District.
