= Si Ma Cai district =

Coordinates: 22.7000°N 104.2867°E

Si Ma Cai district Huyện Si Ma Cai
- District
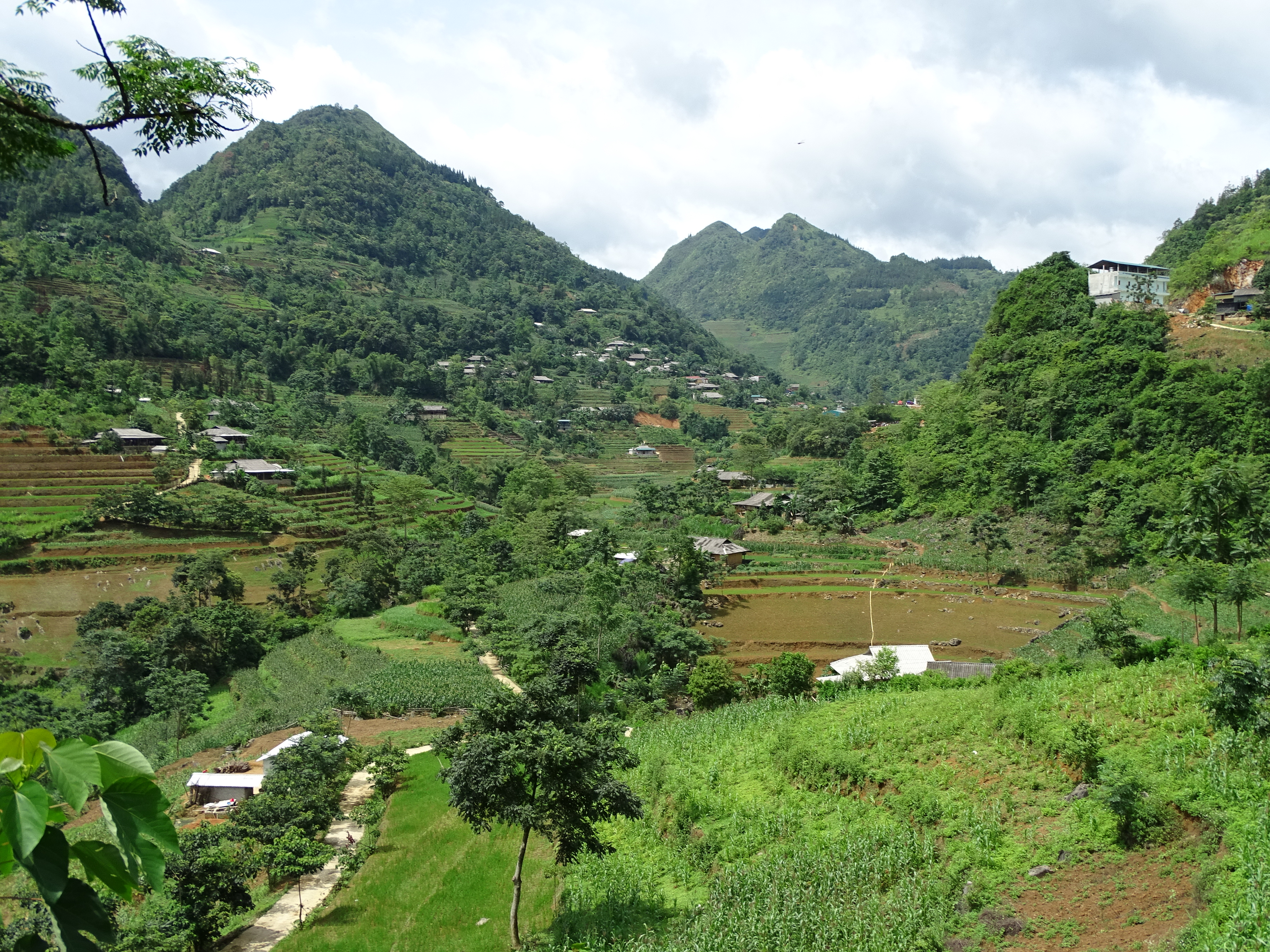
- Scenery at Can Cau - Lao Cai Province

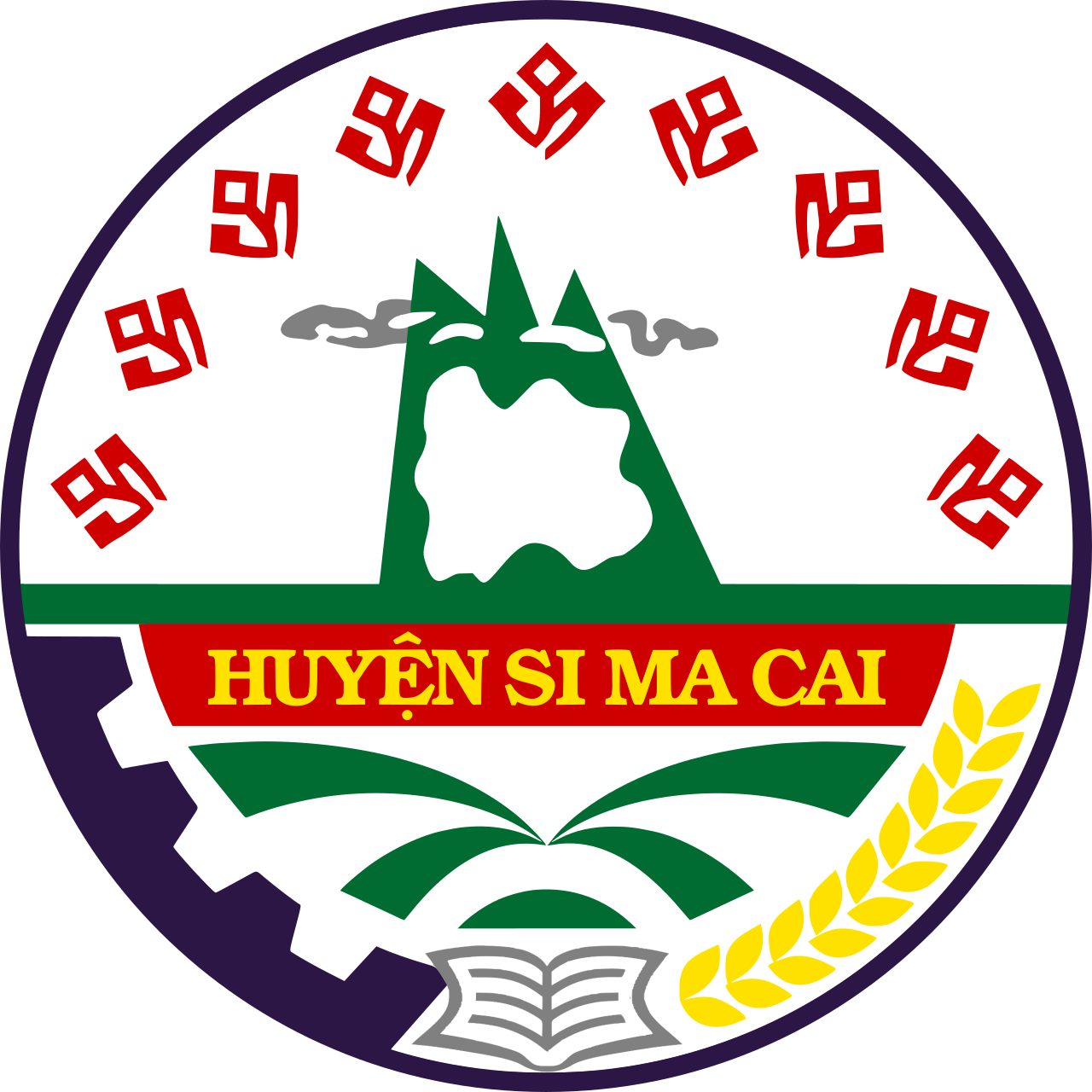
- Seal
- Interactive map of Si Ma Cai district
- Country: Vietnam
- Region: Northeast
- Province: Lào Cai
- Capital: Si Ma Cai

Area
  - Total: 93 sq mi (241 km^{2})

Population (2003)
  - Total: 25,554
- Time zone: UTC+7 (Indochina Time)

Si Ma Cai is a former rural district of Lào Cai province in the Northeast region of Vietnam. As of 2003, the district had a population of 25,554. The district covers an area of 241 km^{2}. The district capital lies at Si Ma Cai.

== Administrative divisions ==
Si Ma Cai, Thào Chư Phìn, Bản Mế, Sán Chải, Lùng Sui, Mản Thẩn, Cán Hồ, Sín Chéng, Lử Thẩn, Quan Thần Sán, Cán Cấu, Nàn Sín and Nàn Sán.
