= Ridge, Robertson County, Texas =

Ridge, Texas
- Unincorporated community
- Location within Texas Location within the United States
- Coordinates: 31°08′44″N 96°19′19″W
- Country: United States
- State: Texas
- County: Robertson
- Elevation: 358 ft (109 m)
- Time zone: UTC-6 (Central (CST))
  - Summer (DST): UTC-5 (CDT)
- Area code: 979
- GNIS feature ID: 1366443

Ridge is an unincorporated community in Robertson County, Texas, United States. Ridge is located along U.S. Route 79 and a Missouri Pacific Railroad line.

Ridge is part of the Bryan–College Station Metropolitan Statistical Area. Ridge's ZIP Code is 77856.

== History ==
Ridge was formed in the 1850s under the name Holly Springs as a community for nearby cotton farmers. In 1916, the Missouri Pacific Railroad placed a switch known as Ridge in the community, and the community became known as Ridge. Ridge's post office opened in 1926; the first postmaster was Robert Reeves.
