= Hmong bobtail dog =

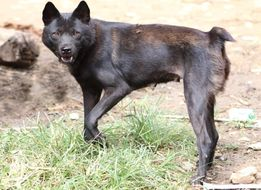
- Other names: Chó H'Mông Cộc đuôi; Hmong Stumpy Tail Dog; Aub Tsab Tws
- Origin: Vietnam
Traits
Height	Males	48–54 cm (19–21 in)
	Females	46–52 cm (18–20 in)
Weight	Males	18–26 kg (40–57 lb)
	Females	16–24 kg (35–53 lb)
Kennel club standards
- Vietnam Kennel Association: standard

The Hmong bobtail dog (Vietnamese: Chó H'Mông Cộc đuôi) is an ancient medium size spitz dog breed and one of Vietnam's Four Great National Dogs (tứ đại quốc khuyển). This dog is primarily used as a hunter, herder and guard dog by the Hmong people in northern Vietnam, and today, they are also used as border police and military dogs. While not recognized by the Fédération Cynologique Internationale, the Hmong bobtail dog is recognized by the Vietnam Kennel Association. In 2023, the Hmong Bobtail Club of America was founded to help promote and gain recognition for the breed in the US.

== History ==
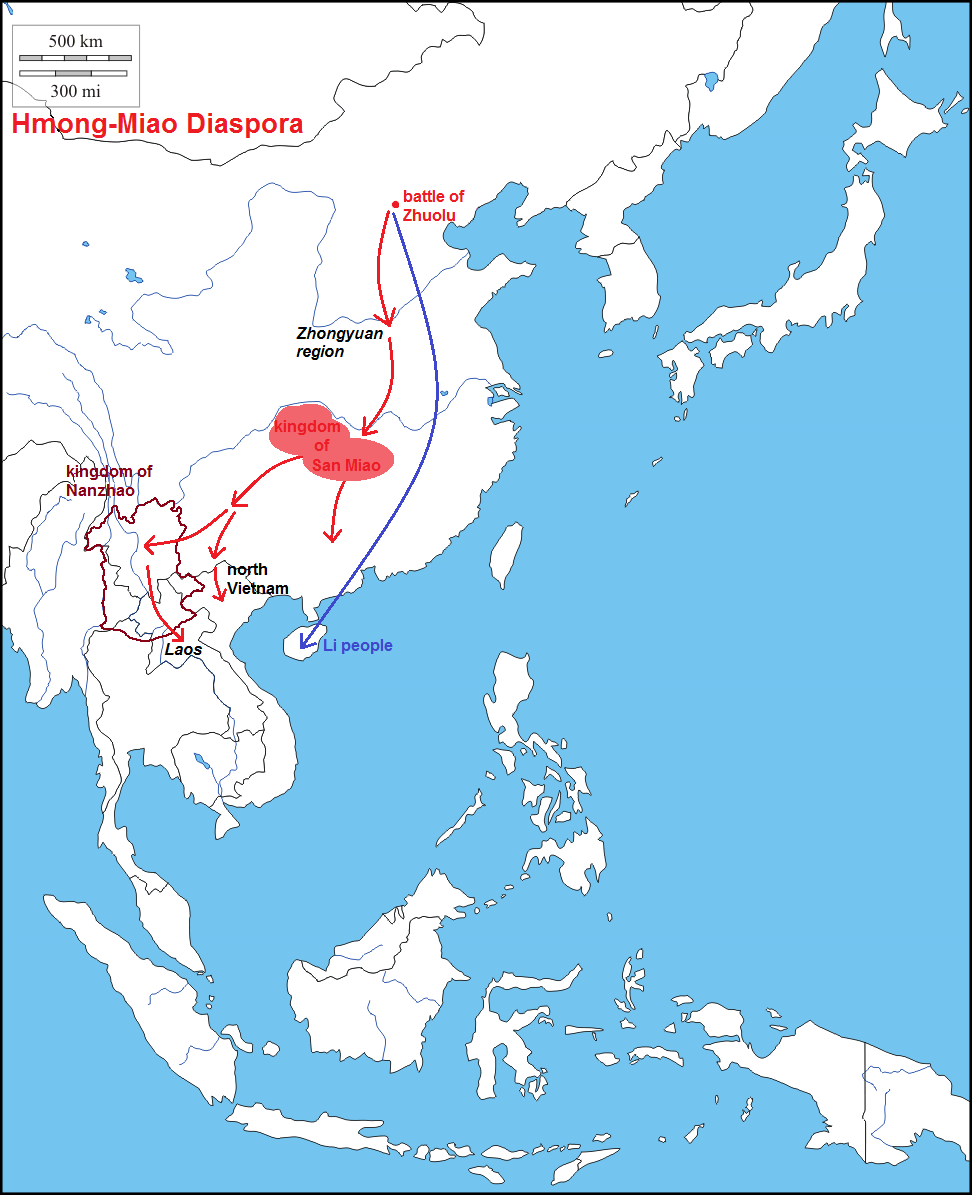
Hmong migration routes

While much of the Hmong bobtail dog's history is speculative, they are thought to be descended from natural bobtails of southern China who accompanied the Hmong in their migration to Vietnam where they were crossed with native Vietnamese jackals. Hmong traditions and legends indicate that they originated near the Yellow River region of China. The Hmong people were subjected to persecution and genocide by the Qing dynasty in the eighteenth and nineteenth centuries, and many fled to the mountains of northern Vietnam. Today the Hmong bobtail can be found in the northern Vietnamese provinces of Hà Giang, Tuyên Quang, Lào Cai, and Yên Bái.

== Characteristics ==
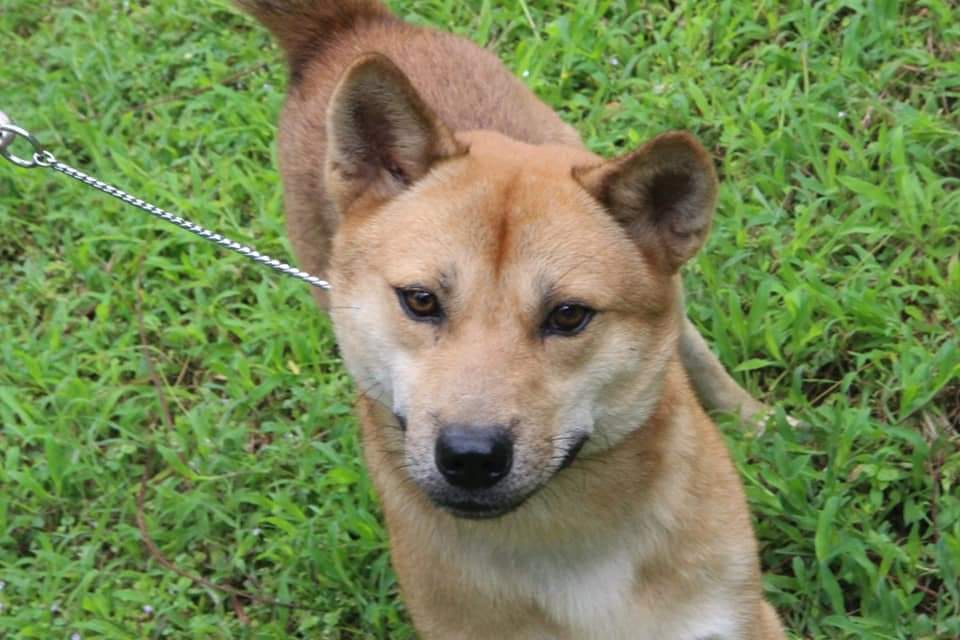
Hmong bobtail profile

=== Appearance ===
Hmong bobtail dogs are square, muscular, medium-sized dogs. Their double coat is short and hard, without any feathering. Their ears are usually upright.

==== Bobtail ====
Hmong bobtail dogs are natural bobtails, no docking is performed. Tail lengths may range from tailless to full tail but the standard size is 3–15 cm (1.2–5.9 in) in length.

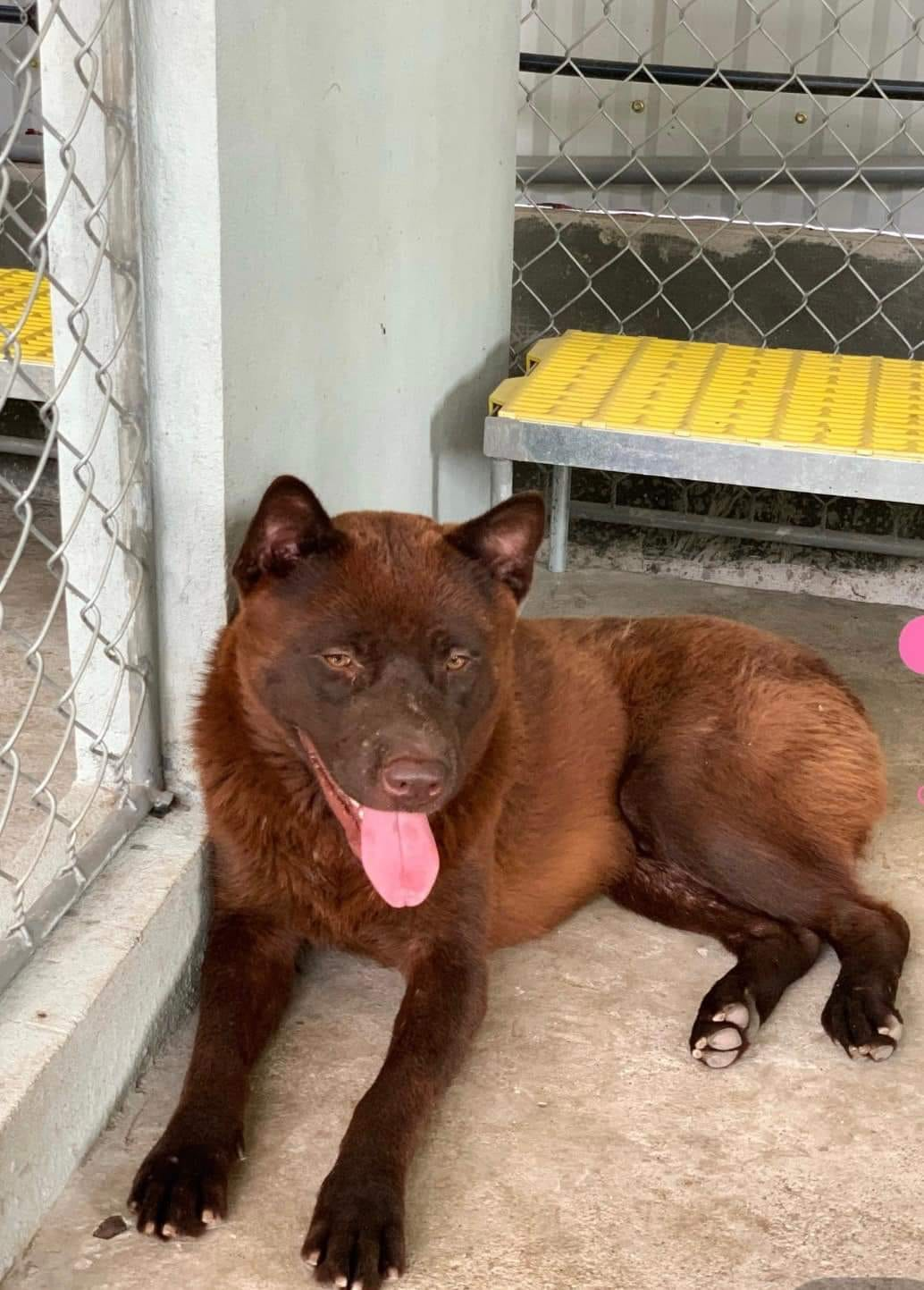
Hmong bobtail laying down

=== Temperament ===
Hmong bobtail dogs are highly intelligent dogs and are prized for their ability to guide their owners along complex routes through the mountains. While Hmong bobtail dogs are loyal and friendly with their owner, they are aloof towards strangers and protective of their territory.

== Health ==
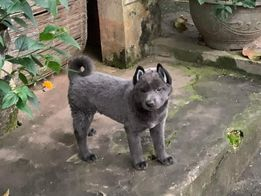
Hmong bobtail puppy with full tail

Hmong bobtail dogs are renowned for their excellent health, resistance to disease and extreme temperature. Their average lifespan is 15–20 years.
