= Lài dog =

Distinct breed of dog

Sông Mã dog
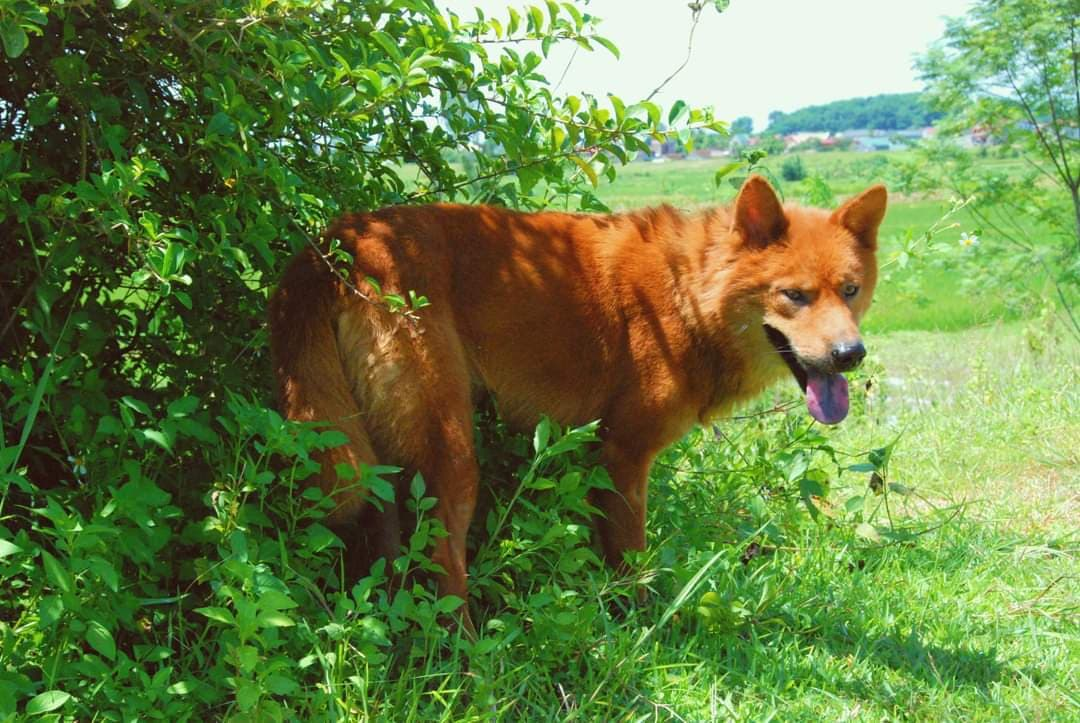
- Other names: chó Lài sông Mã (Ma River Lài dog) chó Lài
- Origin: Vietnam
Traits
Weight	Males	24–26 kg (53–57 lb)
	Females	18–20 kg (40–44 lb)
- Coat: double

The Song Ma dog (Vietnamese: chó Sông Mã is a distinct breed of dogs native to the northern mountains of Vietnam, but also sometimes used ambiguously to refer to any indigenous landrace of Vietnam including the Indochina dingo. It is considered to be one of Vietnam's four great national dogs (tứ đại quốc khuyển), and the only one that is not recognized by the Vietnamese Kennel Club. The Lài dog is indigenous to the highland areas west of Thanh Hóa along the Mã River and in some remote villages in the northern border area where they function as a farm dog, providing pest control around the house, herding cattle or hunting for food in the forest. Today, this landrace is critically endangered with only a few hundred remaining.

== History ==
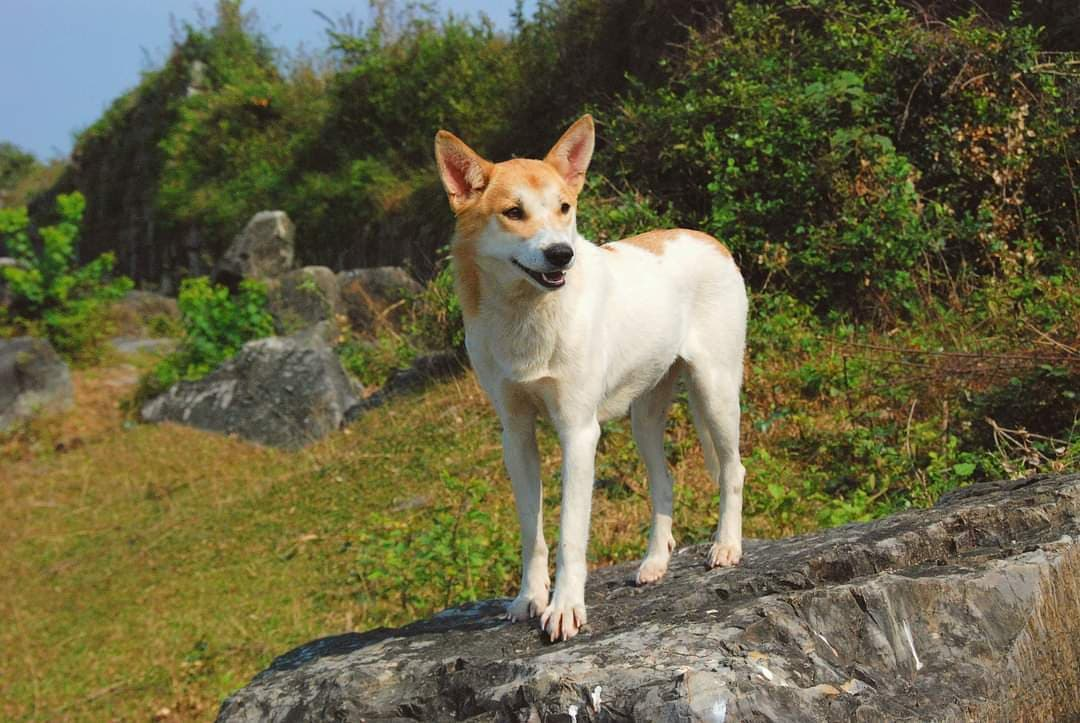
A short haired Lài dog

The Lài dog can be traced to ancient dogs whose fossilized remains have been found along the Yangtze River in China, dated to 7000 years ago. Approximately 4000–6000 years ago, the ancestor to today's Lài dog migrated to Vietnam. While much of the Lài dog's history is speculative, Lài dog motifs have been found carved on Đông Sơn drums, on daggers, short battle axes, combs, drinking mugs, arm guards, and in the graves of Đại Việt warriors who purportedly worshipped them. Vietnamese folk tales state they are the descendants of hybridization between domestic dogs and golden jackals or dholes.

Author Lê Quý Đôn wrote in his historical work Đại Việt thông sử that the Lài dog was selectively bred by Emperor Lê Lợi in the 14th century to serve in the military and as hunting hounds. Lài dogs were instrumental in the Lam Sơn uprising of 1418–1428 by hunting for food, tracking enemy bases, accompanying soldiers on the road, and distracting the enemy. One dog was credited with saving the king's life. After the Lam Son uprising, the Lài dog accompanied Le soldiers to guard remote border regions where they continue to subsist today.

Today the Lài dog is critically endangered. The biggest threat is hybridization due to intrusion of non-native dogs, as traditionally the Lài dog was allowed to roam freely to obtain food for itself. Efforts are underway to collect and breed genetically pure examples in sanctuaries; however, Lài dogs are difficult to obtain due to the remoteness of their native region and the difficulties of rehoming a dog who is very attached to its humans.

== Characteristics ==
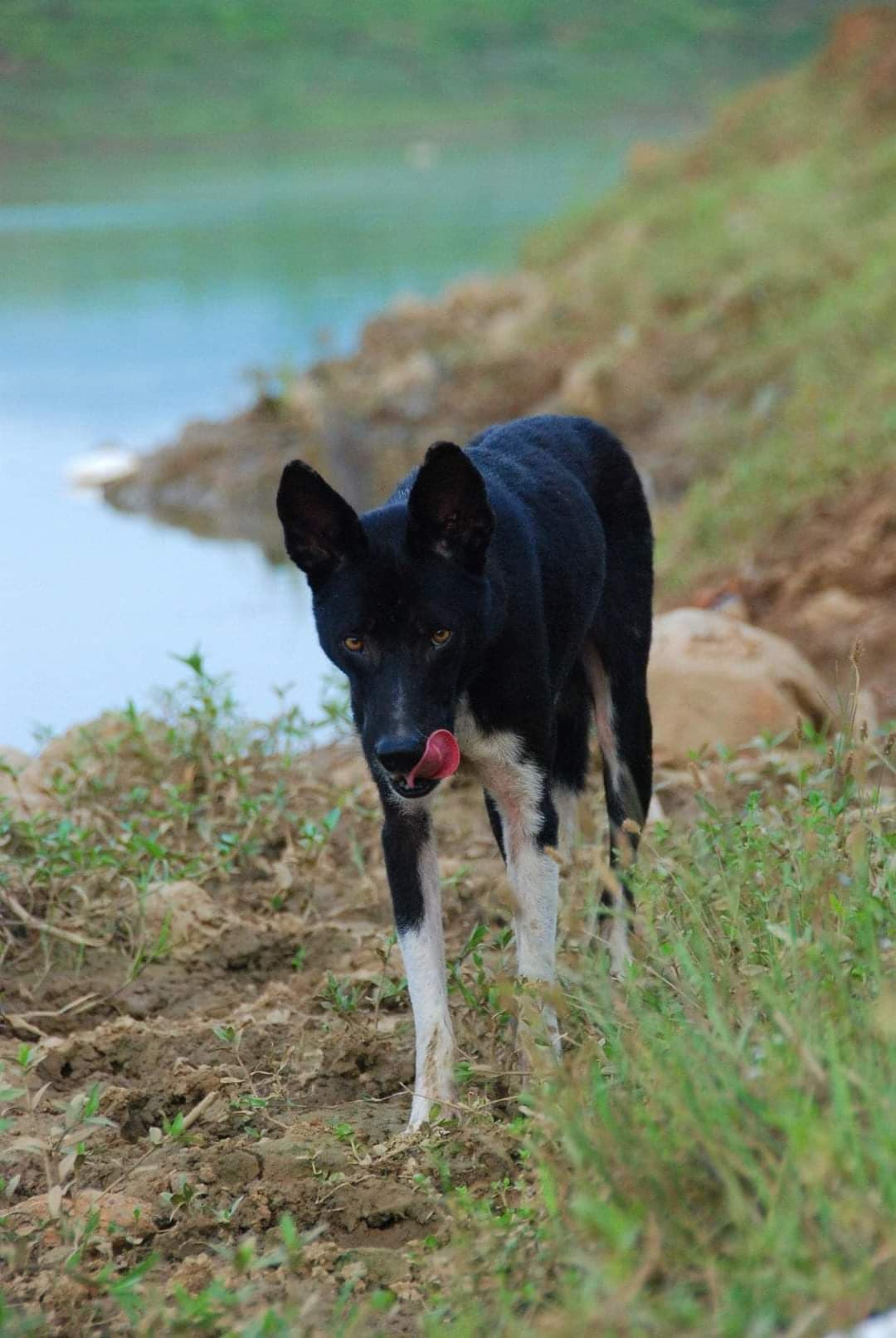
Front profile of a Lài dog

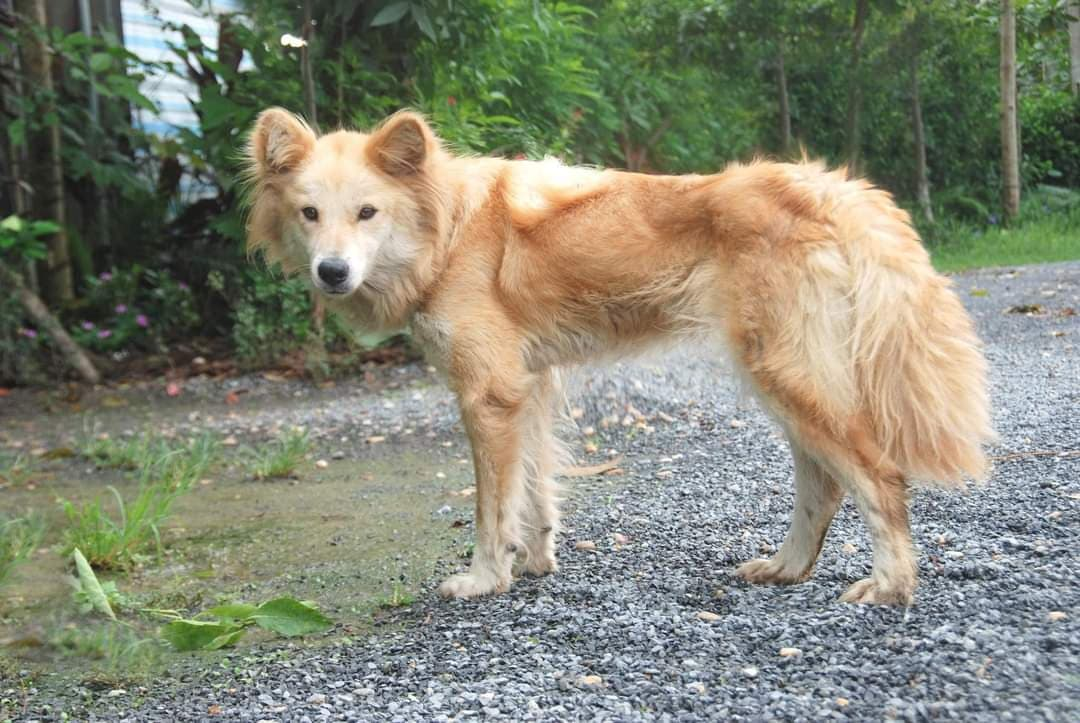
Long-haired Lài Dog

The Lài dog's body is long and wide. The face is long and triangular, with slanted red or amber eyes with dark rims. The ears of the Lài dog are lanceolate-shaped on both sides of the skull, whereas the Indochinese dingo's ears are fixed on the top of the skull. The Lài dog has a scissor bite and the upper snout is longer than lower snout. The tail hangs down in the shape of a reed like a wolf's tail.

Lài dogs have a double coat; the outer coat is rough and provides protection against windy weather, while the soft inner coat keeps the body warm. Lài dogs may either be longhaired or shorthaired. The feet are round and webbed, the forefoot rotates flexibly like a human wrist. allowing the Lài dog to agilely chase prey, including climbing up trees or swimming.

The Lài dog is an intelligent, quick-witted and loyal dog that will aggressively protect their owners. They have excellent drive and stamina. Historically, the Lài dog was used a hunting dog, either by catching and retrieving small game or luring animals to the hunter. Modern Lài dogs are less likely to be used as hunters; however, they retain good instincts to hunt vermin. They are aloof to strangers and make excellent watchdogs.

== Health ==
Lài dogs are considered a very robust breed with few health issues, often living up to 20 years. Due to the scarcity and remoteness of the breed, very little scientific research has been done.
