= Thai Ridgeback =

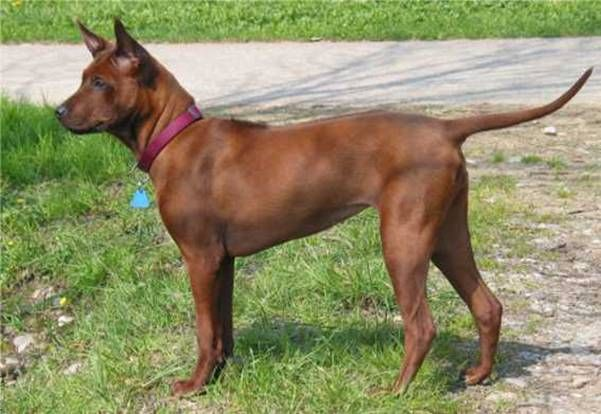
- Red Thai Ridgeback
- Origin: Chanthaburi & Trat, Thailand
Traits
Height	Males	56–61 cm (22–24 in)
	Females	51–56 cm (20–22 in)
Weight	Males	23–34 kg (51–74 lb)
	Females	16–25 kg (35–55 lb)
- Coat: Short
- Color: Red, Black, Blue, Isabella (fawn)
- Litter size: 8 average
Kennel club standards
- Fédération Cynologique Internationale: standard
- Notes: National dog of Thailand

The Thai Ridgeback (Thai: ไทยหลังอาน, RTGS: Thai lang-an) is a dog breed from Thailand.

== Appearance ==
Eight distinctive ridge patterns have been identified: needle, feather, arrow, lute, violin, bowling pin, leaf, and saddleback. All patterns are acceptable, but must be clearly defined and symmetrical. The broader the ridge, the more highly it is prized.

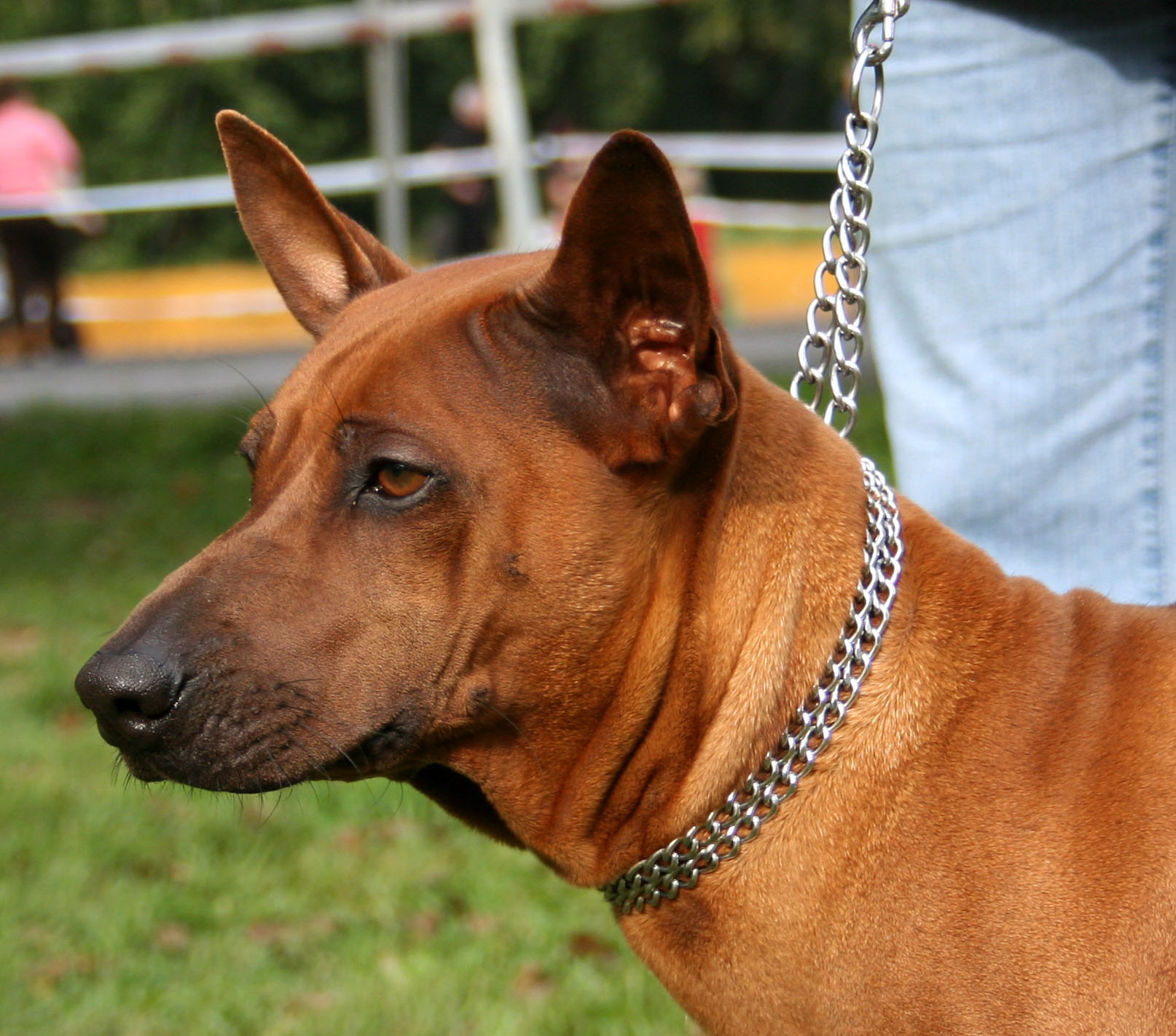
A red Thai Ridgeback

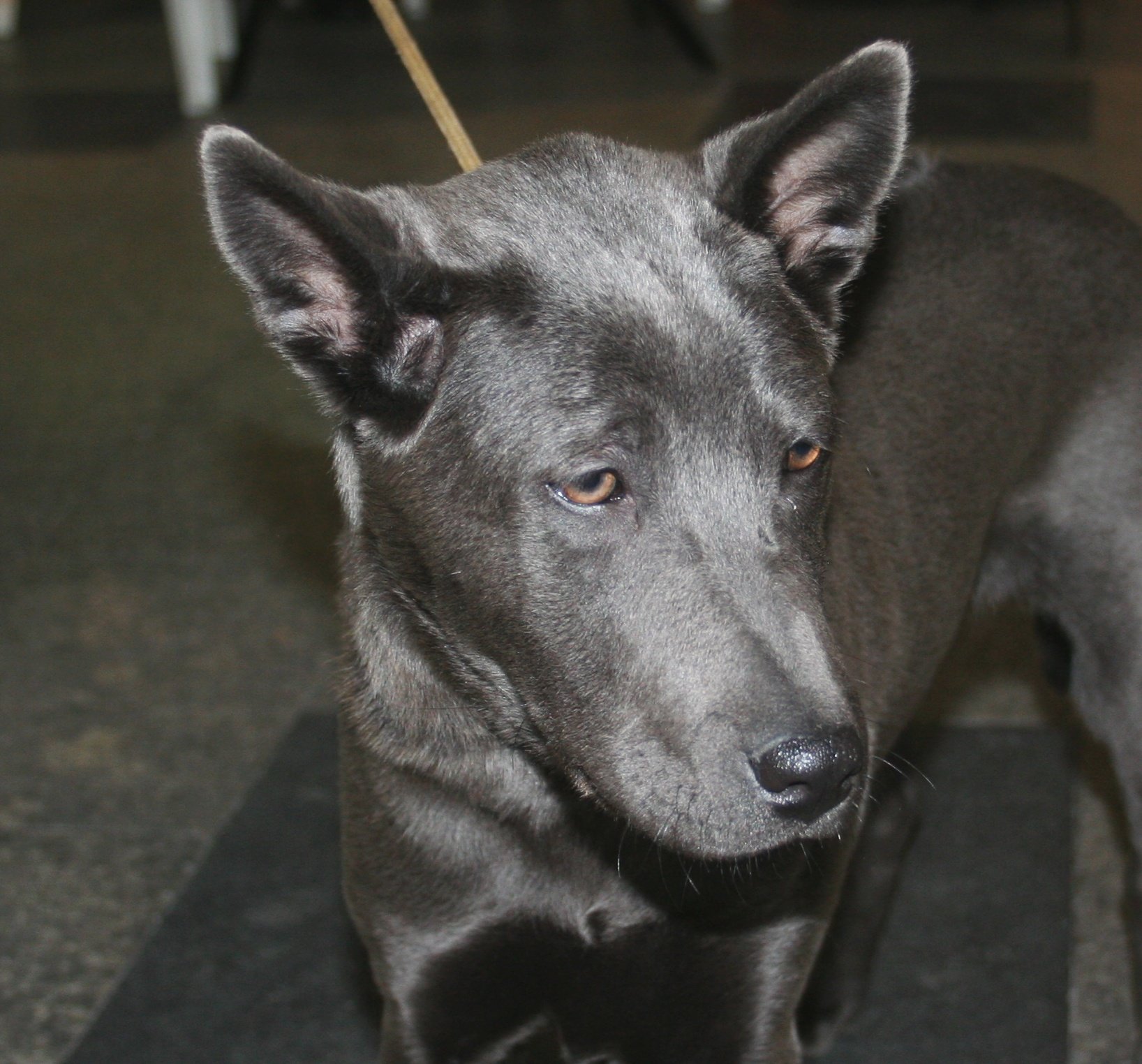
A black Thai Ridgeback

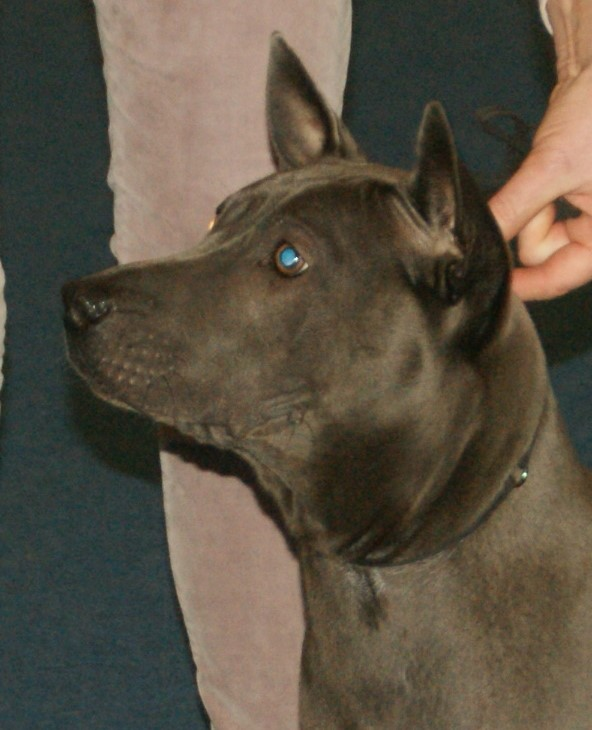
A blue Thai Ridgeback

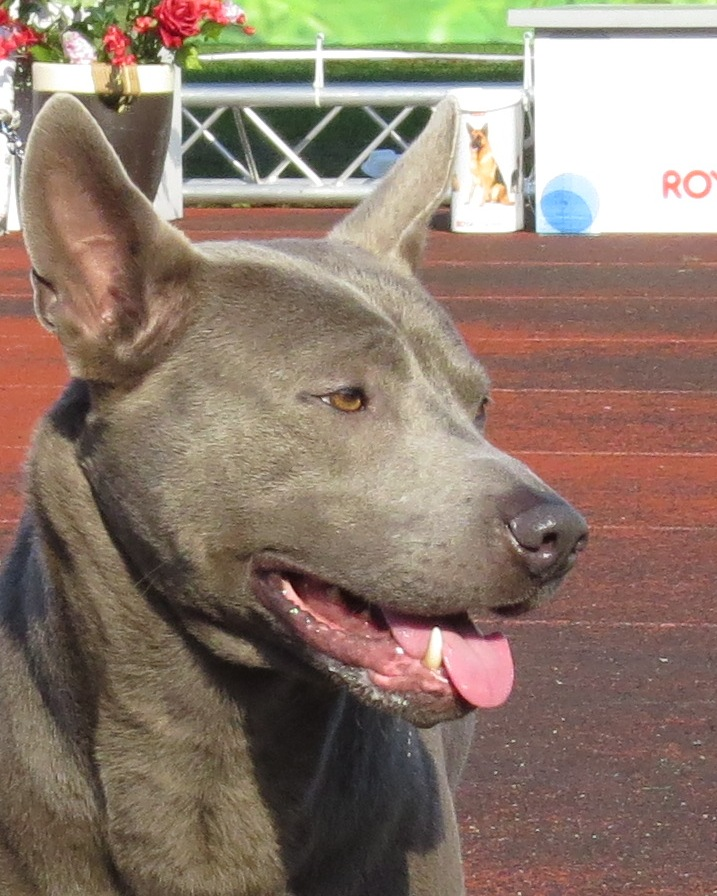
A fawn Thai Ridgeback

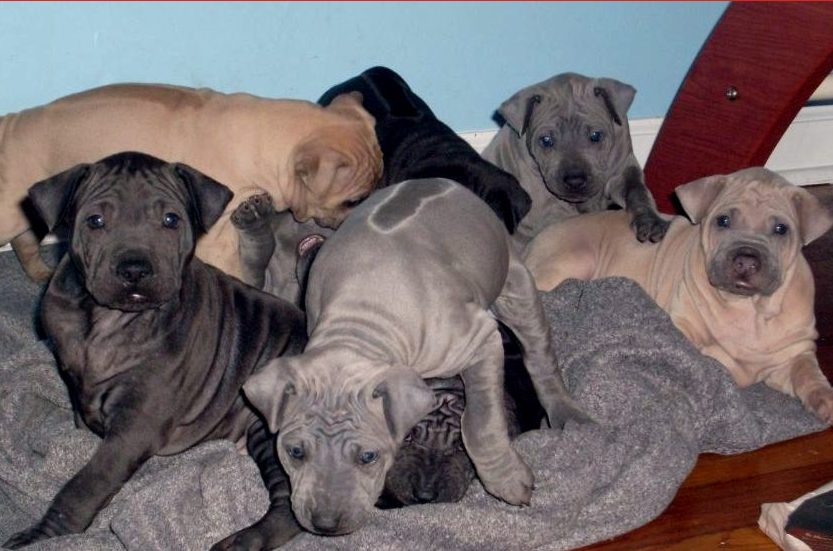
Thai Ridgeback puppies

== Genetics ==
=== Ridge ===
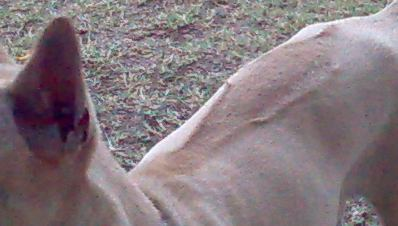
Violin ridge

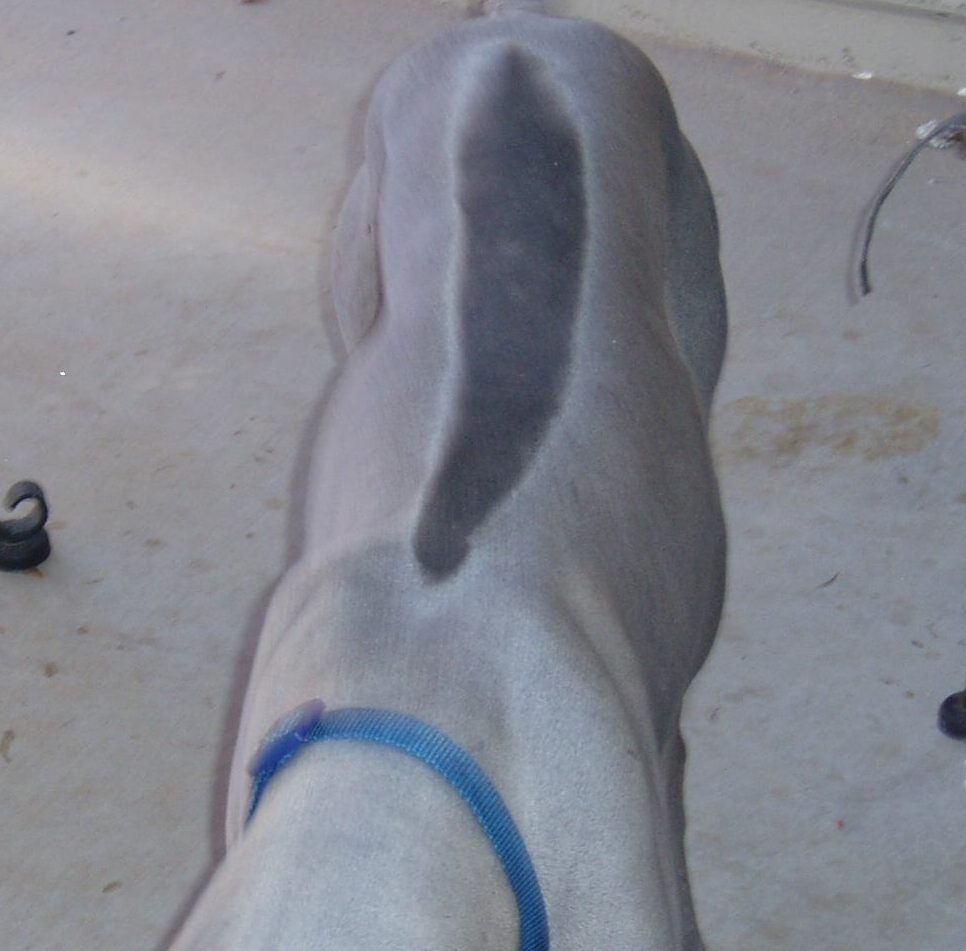
Saddleback Ridge

The ridgeback is under a control of two groups of epistatic genes. The first determines the existence of the ridge. The other determines the size of the ridge, from none to very large (down to the side) the latter, the more the genes in the dog, the broader is the ridge. The ridge will appear only if there is at least one dominant allele in both groups.

== History ==
The Rhodesian Ridgeback is partly descended from the southern African indigenous Hottentot Khoi dog, a known ridge-bearing dog. The gene that causes the ridge has been inherited from a common ancestor: "The geographical origin of the ridge present in Ridgeback dogs is still a mystery, thus solid proof has now been provided that the ridge mutation in Ridgeback dogs is identical by descent and the likelihood of parallel mutations occurring in Asia and Africa (Epstein, 1937) can therefore be rejected."

== Grooming ==
The Thai Ridgeback has a short coat that is easily cared for with a weekly brushing. Use a rubber curry brush to keep it gleaming. It sheds year-round, but not heavily. Give it a bath when it is dirty, maybe once or twice a year. Introduce your puppy to grooming from an early age so that it learns to accept it with little fuss.

== See also ==
- List of dog breeds
- Phu Quoc Ridgeback
- Rhodesian Ridgeback
