= Stonewall Inn =

Gay tavern and monument in New York City

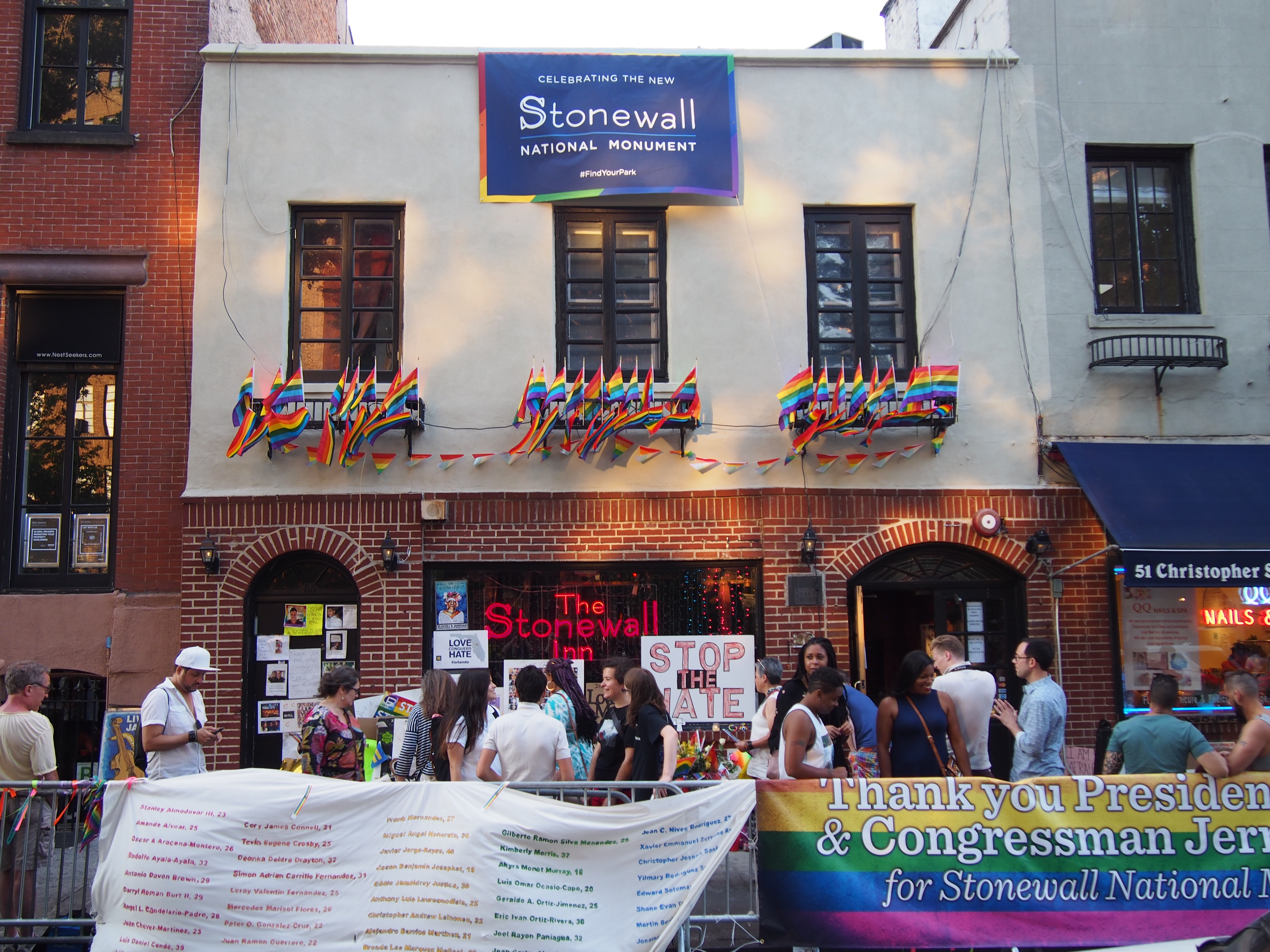
- Facade of Stonewall Inn during the 2016 Pride celebrations
- Former names: Stonewall Inn Restaurant; Bonnie's Stone Wall

General information
- Type: Gay bar (formerly stables, then restaurant)
- Architectural style: Arts and Crafts (1930 facade)
- Location: 51–53 Christopher Street, Greenwich Village, Manhattan, New York, United States
- Coordinates: 40°44′02″N 74°00′08″W
- Current tenants: The Stonewall Inn
- Completed: 1843 (No. 51); 1846 (No. 53)
- Opened: 1934 (restaurant); March 1967 (gay bar); 2007 (current bar)
- Renovated: 1930 (combined and refaced); 2007
- Closed: October 1969 (original bar)
- Owner: Duell LLC

Technical details
- Material: Brick and stucco
- Floor count: 2

Design and construction
- Architect: William Bayard Willis (1930)

Website
- thestonewallinnnyc.com
- Stonewall Inn
- U.S. National Register of Historic Places
- U.S. National Historic Landmark
- U.S. National Monument
- U.S. Historic district – Contributing property
- New York State Register of Historic Places
- New York City Landmark
- Part of: Greenwich Village Historic District (ID79001604)
- NRHP reference No.: 99000562
- NYSRHP No.: 06101.004950
- NYCL No.: 2574

Significant dates
- Added to NRHP: June 28, 1999
- Designated NHL: February 16, 2000
- Designated NMON: June 24, 2016
- Designated CP: June 19, 1979
- Designated NYSRHP: March 24, 1999
- Designated NYCL: June 23, 2015

The Stonewall Inn (also known as Stonewall) is a gay bar and recreational tavern at 53 Christopher Street in the Greenwich Village neighborhood of Lower Manhattan in New York City. It was the site of the 1969 Stonewall riots, which led to the gay liberation movement and the fight for LGBTQ+ rights in the United States. When the riots occurred, Stonewall was one of the relatively few gay bars in New York City. The original gay bar occupied two structures at 51–53 Christopher Street, which were built as horse stables in the 1840s.

The original Stonewall Inn was founded in 1930 as a speakeasy on Seventh Avenue South. It relocated in 1934 to Christopher Street, where it operated as a restaurant until 1966. Four mafiosos associated with the Genovese crime family bought the restaurant and reopened it as a gay bar in early 1967. The Stonewall Inn was a popular hangout for gay men, particularly for youth and those on the fringes of the gay community. Stonewall operated as a private club because it was not allowed to obtain a liquor license; police raided the bar frequently, in spite of bribes from the owners. The Stonewall riots of June 28 to July 3, 1969, took place following one such raid.

The bar went out of business shortly after the riots, and the two buildings were divided and leased to various businesses over the years. In 1990, Jimmy Pisano opened a new bar at 53 Christopher Street, which was initially named New Jimmy's before becoming Stonewall. After Pisano's death in 1994, his boyfriend Thomas Garguilo took over the bar, followed by Dominic DeSimone and Bob Gurecki. The Stonewall Inn closed in 2006, and it reopened in March 2007 after Bill Morgan, Tony DeCicco, Kurt Kelly, and Stacy Lentz acquired the bar. The structure at 51 Christopher Street became a visitor center for the Stonewall National Monument in the 2020s.

The buildings themselves are architecturally undistinguished, with facades of brick and stucco, while the original bar's interior has been modified significantly over the years. The modern bar hosts various events and performances, and its owners also operate an LGBTQ+ advocacy organization. The Stonewall Inn became a tourist attraction and a symbol of the LGBTQ+ community after the riots, and various works of media about the bar have been created over the years. In part because of its impact on LGBTQ+ culture, the Stonewall Inn is the first LGBTQ+ cultural site designated as a National Historic Landmark and a New York City designated landmark. The bar is also part of the Stonewall National Monument, the first U.S. National Monument dedicated to the LGBTQ+ rights movement.

== Background and early history ==
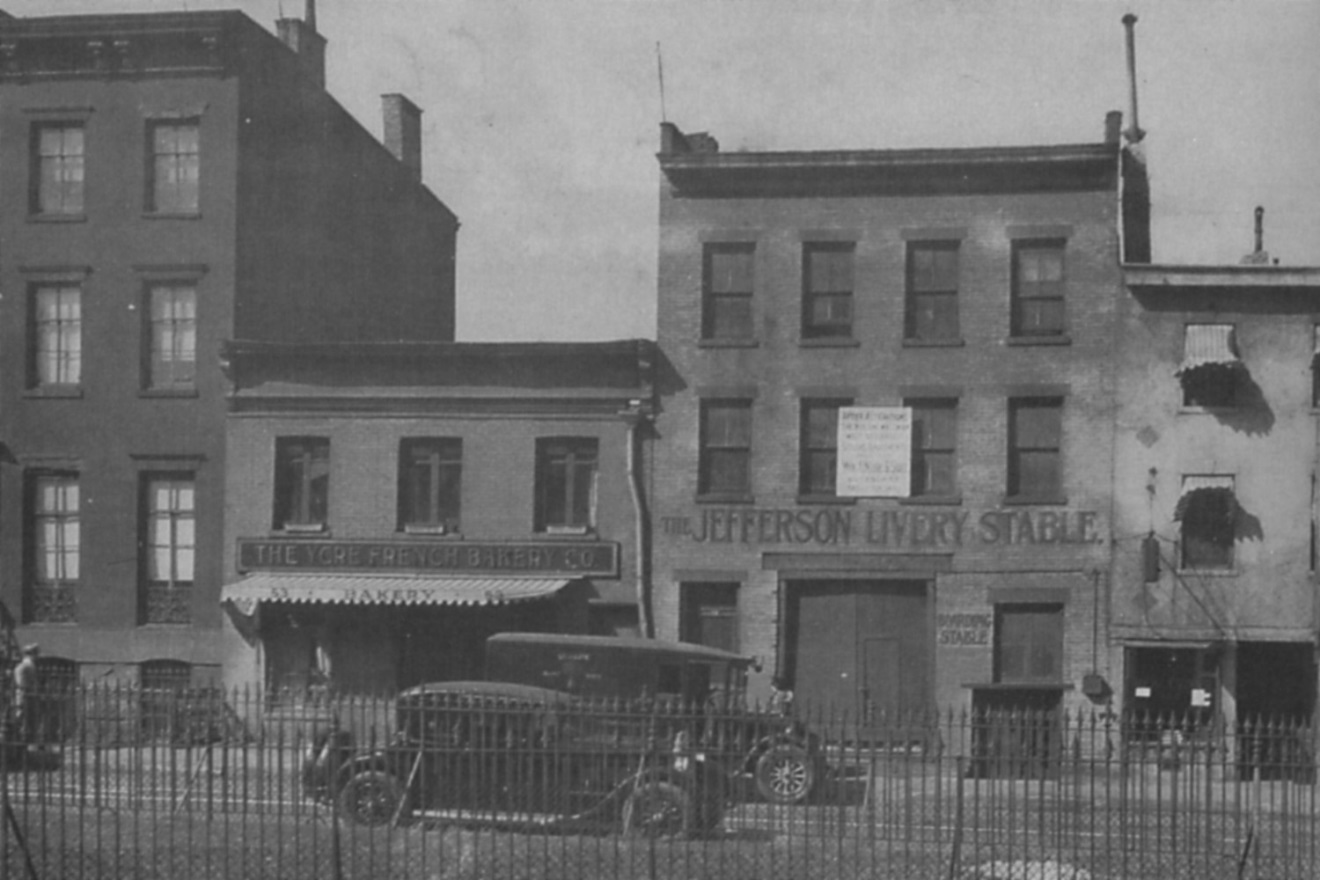
Stonewall Inn buildings in 1928

The Stonewall Inn buildings at 51–53 Christopher Street, in the Greenwich Village neighborhood of Manhattan in New York City, were constructed as double-height horse stables. The older of the two buildings is 51 Christopher Street, which was built in 1843 by A. Voorhis and expanded to three stories in 1898. The other structure, 53 Christopher Street, was built in 1846; it was originally used by Mark Spencer before becoming a bakery operated by Baptiste Ycre in 1914. The then-owner of the buildings, Henry J. Harper, hired the architect William Bayard in 1930 to combine and redesign the structures in the Arts & Crafts style. The two structures were reclad in stucco, and the third story atop 51 Christopher Street was removed. The ground floor continued to host a bakery until 1933, while the Ycre family lived on the second floor.

Meanwhile, Vincent Bonavia had opened Bonnie's Stone Wall (or Bonnie's Stonewall) at 91 Seventh Avenue South, near the Christopher Street buildings, in 1930. Bonnie's Stonewall might have been named after The Stone Wall, a lesbian autobiography by Mary Casal. The historian David Carter wrote that, even in the 1930s, this may have been an attempt to subtly welcome queer women. The bar was a secret speakeasy that illegally sold alcohol during Prohibition in the United States; as a consequence, it was raided in December 1930. Bonavia relocated to 51–53 Christopher Street in 1934, after Prohibition was repealed. The architect Harry Yarish installed a large vertical sign on the facade and a doorway with columns around the entrance to 53 Christopher Street. The interior was designed in the style of a hunting lodge.

The New York City Landmarks Preservation Commission (LPC) wrote that, despite a lack of documentation on Stonewall's early history, "sources suggest that it was among the most notorious of the tearooms operating in the Village in the early 1930s". The restaurant hosted various banquets and weddings, as well as events including a 1935 dinner for the Greenwich Village Association and a 1961 reunion party for performers involved with the play Summer and Smoke. The eatery had become Bonnie's Stonewall Inn by the 1940s and the Stonewall Inn Restaurant by the 1950s or 1960s. The interior of the restaurant was destroyed by fire in the 1960s, and the structures at 51 through 61 Christopher Street were sold in March 1965. Sources disagree over whether the new owner was Burt and Lucille Handelsman or Joel Weiser. The restaurant had definitely shuttered by 1966. After the restaurant closed, the buildings were vacant; the signs above the ground-story windows were removed, and the second story of the facade was patched.

== Original gay bar ==
=== Renovation and conversion ===
Greenwich Village had become an LGBTQ+ neighborhood as early as the 1930s. The neighborhood's LGBTQ+ community was originally concentrated around Greenwich Avenue and Washington Square Park, but, by the 1960s, had started to move westward along Christopher Street. To cater to the growing LGBTQ+ community, in 1966, four mafiosi associated with the Genovese crime family paid $3,500 for the Stonewall Inn, turning the restaurant into a gay bar. The team of owners were led by "Fat Tony" Lauria; he paid $2,000 for the restaurant, and three other mobsters named Zookie Zarfas, Tony the Sniff, and Joey paid $500 each. It was one of several gay bars operated by the Genovese syndicate in New York City. Matty Ianniello, a Genovese mafioso who controlled various mob-operated bars, collected a portion of the bar's profits.

The owners believed that a business catering to the LGBTQ+ community might be profitable; in return, they demanded regular payoffs for protection. Stonewall's owners could not obtain a liquor license because state law in the 1960s did not allow bartenders to legally serve LGBTQ+ people. At the time, the New York State Liquor Authority (NYSLA) regarded any LGBTQ+ person in a bar as engaging in disorderly conduct. Frequent raids against gay bars forced most to close, except for those operated by mobsters. Furthermore, gay people who were arrested risked losing their jobs, homes, and families. By contrast, members of private clubs could bring their own alcoholic beverages under New York state law. Accordingly, Lauria and his co-owners acquired a private club's license for Stonewall, as they intended to serve LGBTQ+ people without obtaining a license from the NYSLA.

After acquiring the buildings, the owners renovated the exterior, blacked out the windows for privacy, and reinforced the wooden front doors with steel plates in anticipation of police raids. The new operators added peepholes and several locks to the front doors, and they removed the columns that flanked the original entrance. The operators also placed 2×4 pieces of wood behind the windows so the police could not easily enter through the windows during a raid. The interior was painted black because that color was used in other gay bars and it would hide the interior's burn damage. The new owners retained the Stonewall Restaurant's old name so they did not have to replace the exterior sign (although the word "restaurant" was officially dropped from the name, that word was not painted over on the sign). At the time of the conversion, LGBTQ+ bars and straight bars had similar facades, though LGBTQ+ bars tended to have an intentionally rundown appearance so straight patrons would be discouraged from going to these bars.

=== Operation ===
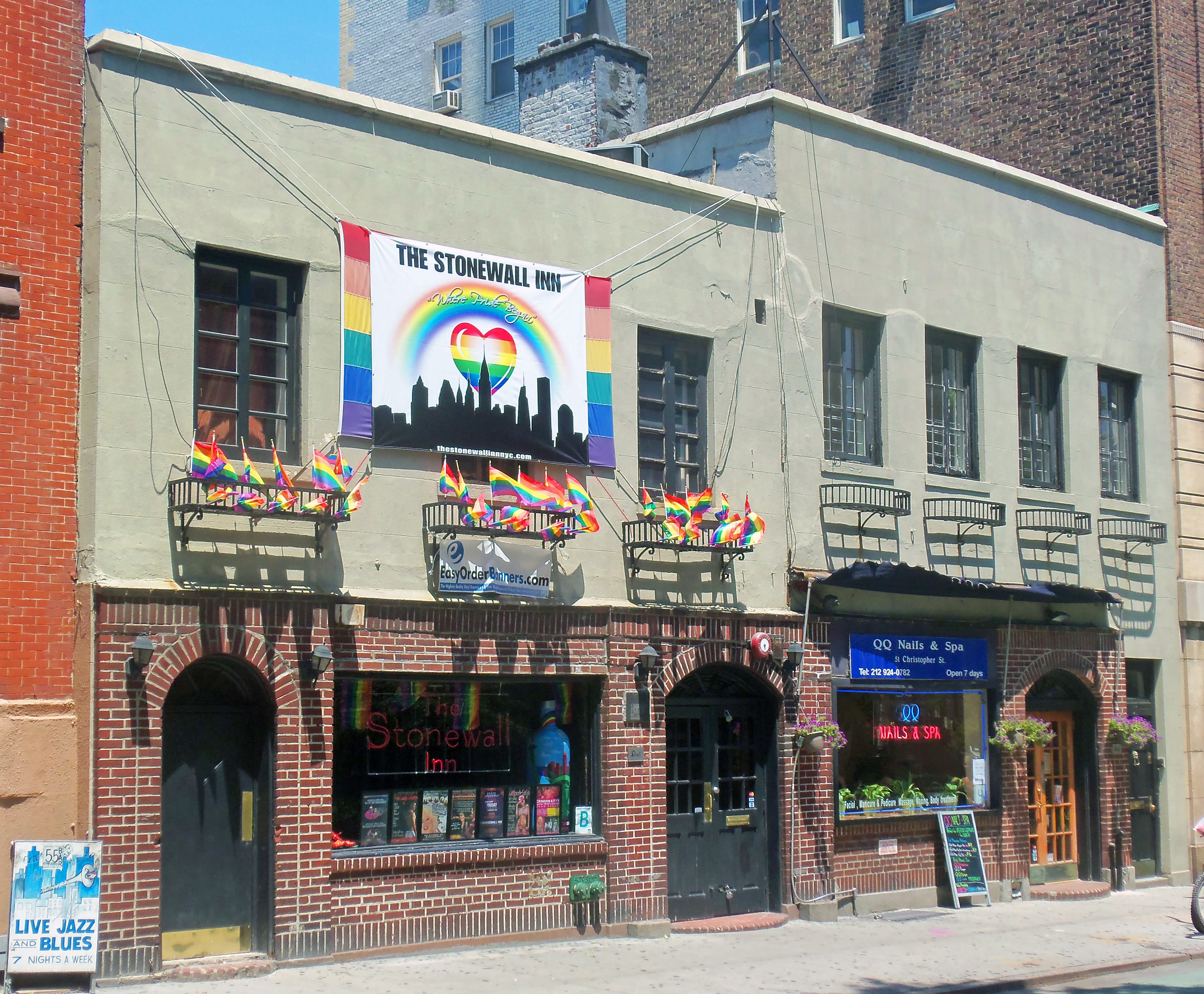
The exterior of Stonewall Inn in 2012. At the time of Stonewall's conversion into a gay bar, the facade was nondescript.

Stonewall opened as a gay bar on March 18, 1967. It had two dance floors in addition to a long bar, jukebox, tables, and seating booths. The facade was nondescript, and the only external indication of the club's existence was a small sign proclaiming that it was a private, members-only club. When it opened, Stonewall "was a small gay bar just like any other", as the LGBTQ+ newspaper Gay News would later describe it. Its manager was Edward Francis "Skull" Murphy, an ex-convict who was known for sitting motionless around the bar and watching patrons.

==== Clientele ====
Visitors were greeted by bouncers who inspected them through the peepholes in the door. The bouncers accepted almost any LGBTQ+ individual who wanted to enter, but they screened out straight patrons and undercover police officers. Admission was granted to would-be patrons who "looked gay" or who had visited the club before, as well as new patrons who were accompanied by someone that could vouch for them. People under the legal drinking age were frequently admitted. In keeping with private club regulations, patrons were required to sign a logbook upon entry; the logbook also served to screen out straight patrons. The visitor logbook frequently contained pseudonyms such as Donald Duck, Elizabeth Taylor, and Judy Garland. If a visitor wished to leave the bar and return the same night, the bouncers would stamp their hand with individual ink. Any customer who passed the screening process paid an admission fee of $3 on weekends and $1 on weekdays.

Patrons were predominantly in their teens or early twenties, though men in their late twenties and early thirties congregated around the main room's bar. Most patrons were young gay men of various races and occupations, though Stonewall did also accept women (regardless of sexuality), transsexuals, and transvestites. It is unknown to what extent women patronized the bar, though several observers interviewed by David Carter described the bar as being almost exclusively male. These observers also said that almost all of the lesbians at Stonewall were butch lesbians. Due to differing terminologies used in the late 1960s, it is also unknown to what extent transvestites visited the bar, but Carter writes that the number of transsexual and transvestite customers was not insignificant. (Note: Carter writes that Stonewall's customers were frequently described as "queens" but that, in the late 1960s, the word "queen" was used mainly to describe gay men who did not dress in a typically masculine way. By the 2000s, the word had become shorthand for a drag queen.) Many homeless young men slept across the street in Christopher Park and would often try to enter so customers would buy them drinks.

The Stonewall Inn was a popular hangout for gay men. The bar was called "one of the most active spots in town currently; very crowded on weekends" in a 1968 guidebook, and it was New York City's only gay bar that allowed open dancing. It was also located on a busy road and was cheaper than comparable gay bars. The artist Thomas Lanigan-Schmidt recalled that Stonewall was one of the only bars in the city where couples could slow dance together, while the historian Martin Duberman said that the bar was frequented by a "non-vanilla mix of people: people in suits and ties, street hustlers, drag queens, a few dope pushers, a fair number of nonwhites". The New York Daily News called the bar a "mecca" for the LGBTQ+ community in the neighborhood, and Newsday wrote that "Here the young men with the delicate wrists and the bobby pins in their hair come to dance the night away with one another". One contemporary patron described the bar as being accepting of "anyone who was in the margins of gay society", but that this gave the bar a "trashy, low, and tawdry" feel. Homeless youth and drag queens frequented the bar by 1969; it was one of the only places where they were socially accepted, and the admission fee meant that additional drinks did not require a tab. Other LGBTQ+ patrons shunned Stonewall because of its mob ownership and the drag queens' presence.

==== Ambiance and activities ====
As a private club, Stonewall was not legally allowed to accept money for drinks, and each customer was given two tickets that could be exchanged for drinks. Different-colored tickets were used each day to prevent patrons from saving up drink tickets. The Stonewall Inn's operators pressured customers to buy drinks almost as soon as they entered. Each drink cost a dollar, more than in contemporary bars, even though they were watered-down drinks that were, in many cases, acquired illegally. The owners could earn up to $5,000 on Fridays and $6,500 on Saturdays, and, given the monthly rent of $300, recouped their $3,500 investment soon after opening. The cash registers were taken the first time the New York City Police Department (NYPD) raided the bar; thereafter, Stonewall's income was stored in cigar boxes. The activist Craig Rodwell described Stonewall as "one of the [...] more financially lucrative of the Mafia's gay bars in Manhattan".

The spaces were poorly lit, giving it the impression of a dive bar. At the rear of the bar, the men's restroom had its own attendant, and the women's restroom had a red lightbulb. The main room's bar lacked running water, forcing barkeeps to run dirty glasses through rubber tubs and immediately reuse them. The bar had a poor sound system, and the toilets were regularly clogged, giving the Stonewall Inn a reputation for filthiness. The buildings, at the time, did not have a rear emergency exit, which not only precluded Stonewall from receiving a liquor license but also created a fire hazard. Additionally, the bar's employees were known to have engaged in blackmail. In the 1969 edition of the New York Mattachine Society's guidebook to gay clubs around the city, there was a notation advising would-be patrons against giving out any personally identifying information at the Stonewall Inn, especially to employees. The bar was not openly used for prostitution, but drug sales and other cash transactions did take place, and Carter wrote that "there is little doubt" that a prostitution ring operated out of the second story. Six months before the Stonewall riots, the bar had reportedly been the source of a small outbreak of hepatitis.

Despite the poor conditions, the Stonewall Inn's popularity endured. Stonewall was the only bar for gay men in New York City where dancing was allowed, and dancing was its main draw after it opened as a gay club. Of the two bar rooms, the main room to the east typically played mainstream rock. There was a jukebox behind the bar in the main room; patrons could pay to have a song played on the jukebox. In addition to dancing, the main room was a popular place for gay men to congregate and cruise, and there were a small number of tables with candles. There was typically a single waiter in the main room, which was often called the "white room" because of its music and clientele.

The back room, to the west, mostly played soul music. It was called the black room or the Puerto Rican room, as it was frequented by black and Hispanic customers, as well as youth. The back room was even more dimly lit than the main room, and it had numerous waiters, all of whom cajoled guests to buy drinks. The south end of the back room, near Christopher Street, was occupied by "the most marginal of the Stonewall's customers". Around 1968, the owners removed a partition in 51 Christopher Street to create a dance floor, while another partition was installed in 53 Christopher Street. Alice Echols, in a 2010 book, cited the two dance floors as possibly having "helped to undermine the sort of sexual indirection and repression that characterized most gay bars".

==== Bribes and raids ====
The bar's lack of a license made it vulnerable to police raids. The owners gave cash bribes to the NYPD's 6th Precinct (within which the bar was located) to stave off raids. A magazine article, published five months after the bar's opening, implied that the bar paid the police around $1,200 a month. Some observers such as the activist Craig Rodwell objected to the payoffs because of the corruption involved. In addition, despite these payoffs, Stonewall was raided once a month on average, and it was raided even more frequently before elections or when local residents complained. Seymour Pine, a police inspector who later led the raid that caused the Stonewall riots, said his team frequently raided gay bars because LGBTQ+ people did not fight back when they were arrested. Pine recalled that limousines carrying wealthy patrons would come to the bar on Saturdays, so he tried to avoid raiding the bar on these nights.

The bar's management usually knew about raids beforehand due to police tip-offs, and raids occurred early enough in the evening that business could commence after the police had finished. There were white floodlights inside the bar, which could be activated in case of a raid. Many bars kept extra liquor nearby so they could resume business as quickly as possible if alcohol was seized. During a typical raid, the lights were turned on, and customers were lined up and their identification cards checked. Those without identification were often arrested, along with the bar's staff. Also liable to be arrested were people who did not wear at least three pieces of gender-conforming clothing, such as men in full drag. Anyone who was detained in a raid was often released within hours, and as a result the staff were unconcerned about being arrested.

By June 1969, campaigning for that year's mayoral election had precipitated frequent raids in local bars, including one at the Stonewall Inn less than a week before the Stonewall riots. The raids targeted not only gay bars but also straight bars frequented by minorities, and several clubs in Greenwich Village closed because of these raids. According to Rodwell and the novelist Edmund White, the new captain of the NYPD's 6th Precinct had ordered the raids in Greenwich Village. In a 1987 retrospective, Robert Amsel wrote in the LGBTQ+ magazine The Advocate that many LGBTQ+ people were in favor of the raids because they did not want the bars to be operated by the mafia; according to Amsel, these critics did not see that "without the mafia's money, there might not have been any gay bars to legitimize".

=== Uprising ===
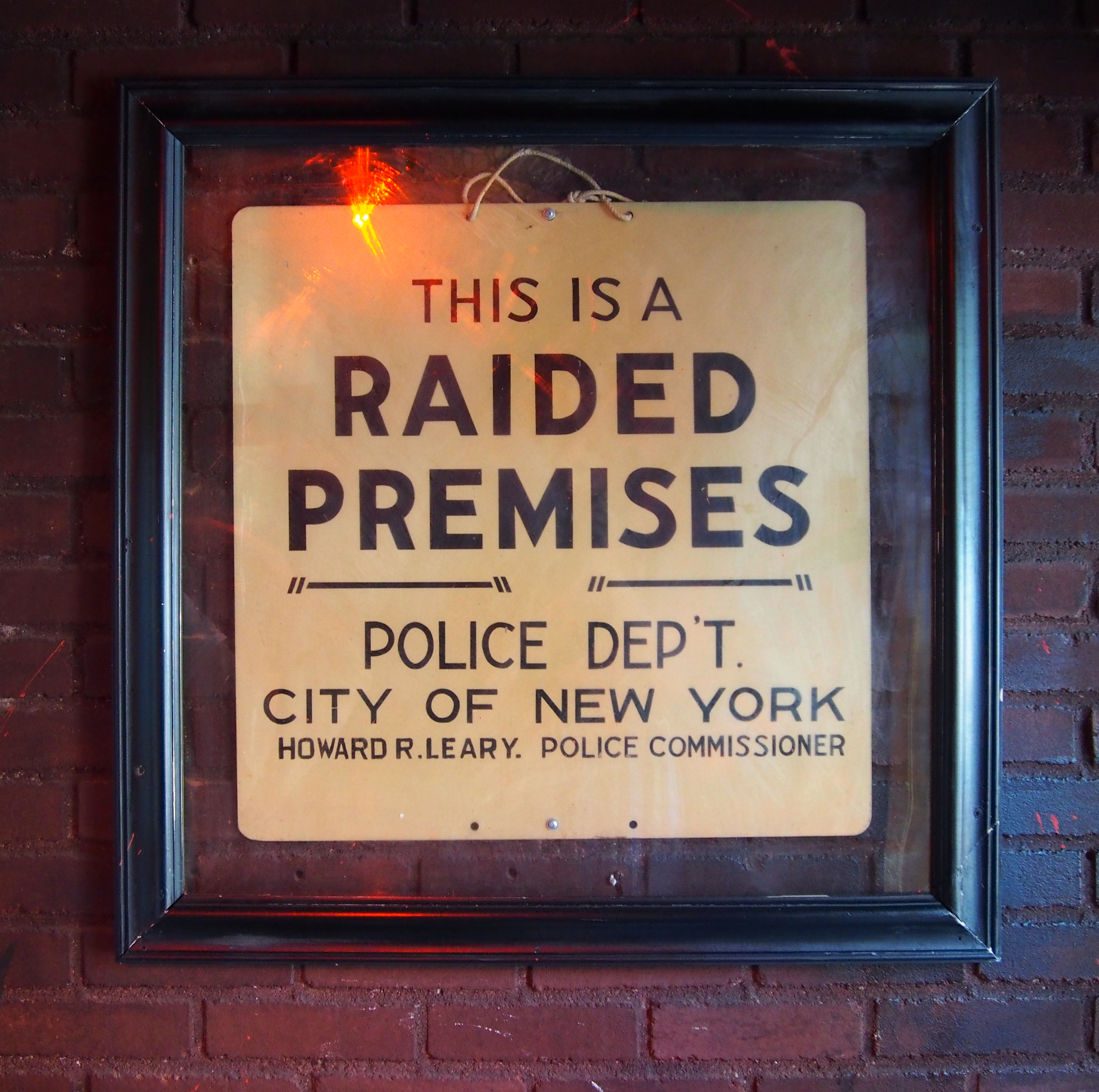
A "Raided Premises" sign hung inside the modern Stonewall Inn, 2016

The Stonewall riots started in the early morning hours of June 28, 1969. According to a Daily News article from the time, the NYPD had obtained a warrant to raid the bar because it was illegally serving liquor; later accounts said the raid was precipitated by an anonymous tip that the Mafia was trading stolen bonds. Murphy was allegedly involved with the bonds from a gay sex-trafficking scheme. In any case, it was the first time the NYPD did not give the managers advance notice of a raid. Around 1:20 a.m., a team of eight undercover officers, led by Pine, raided the bar. As was customary, the police began to check patrons' identification. The routine raid did not go as planned, as patrol wagons for the arrested patrons took longer to arrive than expected. A scuffle broke out when a butch lesbian in handcuffs was escorted from the door of the bar to the waiting police wagon several times. The police tried to restrain some of the crowd and knocked a few people down, which incited bystanders even more. Eventually, the police were barricaded inside; the crowd was not cleared until 4:00 a.m.

Almost everything in the Stonewall Inn was broken in the riots, and what little liquor remained was given away for free afterward. Stonewall's windows were covered with boards the night of the riots, and graffitied messages in support of LGBT rights and gay bars appeared on the bar's facade the day afterward. The riot was covered in the city's major media outlets, including in radio and newspapers. Another demonstration took place on June 29; it attracted hundreds of protesters of all sexualities. Activity in Greenwich Village was sporadic over the next two days due to inclement weather, but another riot took place on July 2. The riots ultimately ended on July 3, when the NYPD dispersed the protests. Allen Ginsberg, a beat poet who witnessed the riots, said that "the guys there were so beautiful—they've lost that wounded look that fags all had 10 years ago".

== After the riots ==
=== 1960s to 1980s ===
==== Closure and relocation ====
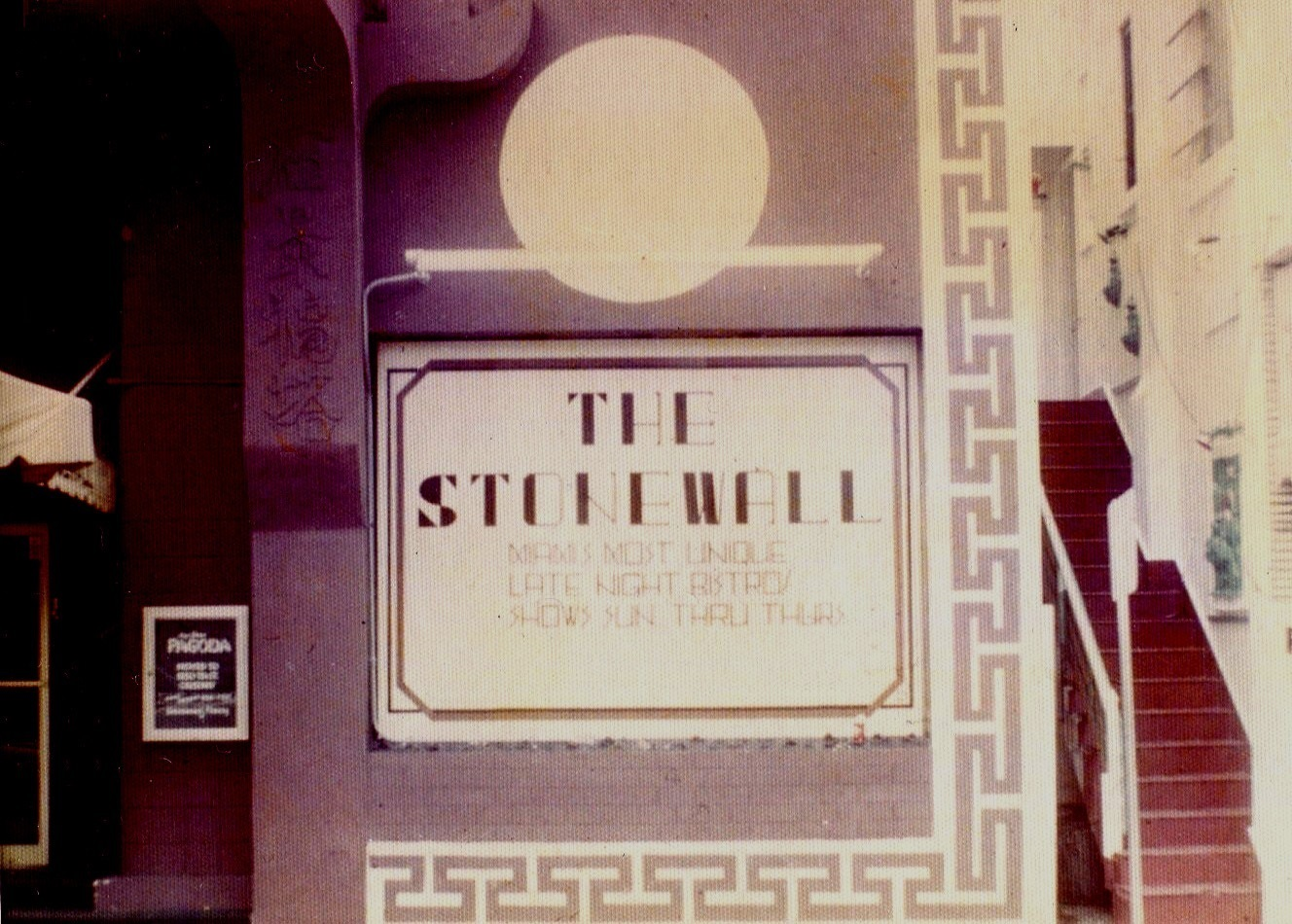
Stonewall Miami Beach before the 1974 fire

By the end of 1969, the Stonewall Inn had closed; sources disagree on whether it was shuttered in October or in December. Carter writes that the bar's downfall may have been because of its infamy, the fact that it had no liquor license, and resentment toward the mafiosos who operated the bar. Pine claimed that he had been ordered to raid the bar because it was blackmailing wealthy patrons, but Carter could not find evidence to corroborate this claim. A Newsday article from 1970 described Stonewall as "still a battered, broken place, with a For Rent sign on it now".

Another Stonewall opened at 211 22nd Street in Miami Beach, Florida, in 1972 with the same manager. Two patrons there filed a lawsuit against the local police chief in 1973, asserting malicious harassment. The Miami Beach establishment burned down shortly before 7:00 a.m. on March 2, 1974, following a suspected arson.

==== Commercial conversion ====
Manny E. Duell, the operator of a holding company named 51 to 61 Christopher Corp., took over the buildings in March 1970. The owners submitted alteration plans to the New York City Landmarks Preservation Commission and the New York City Department of Buildings in late 1970, as they sought to convert 51 to 53 Christopher Street into a restaurant and non-alcoholic bar. The new venue would have retained most of the 1967 bar's interior decorations, but the architects planned to replace the damaged doors and windows. By 1973, the original gay bar had been divided into two storefronts at the ground level and apartments on the second story. The Gay Activists Alliance planned to install a plaque on the buildings, as it did not have enough money to buy the structures for preservation purposes. LPC documents show that, in 1975, Duell leased out the two storefronts there as distinct spaces. Thereafter, the buildings were used by a variety of businesses, and subsequent renovations removed all of the original gay bar's decorations. Documents indicate that the owners of 51 Christopher Street filed plans to widen that building's entrance in August 1975. The structure at 53 Christopher had become a bagel shop known as Bagels And by 1976. Mimi Sheraton, in a New York Times article from that year, described 53 Christopher Street as having wood-paneled walls, wood columns, and rhombus-shaped mirrors, giving the appearance of a "never-ending abstract forest". A commemorative plaque was installed on the facade in 1979 on the tenth anniversary of the riots.

After serving as a bagel shop, 53 Christopher Street became a Chinese restaurant, known as the Szechuan Cottage Restaurant. Sources disagree on when the changeover occurred. The LPC writes that the Chinese restaurant was in operation by 1982, when the restaurant altered the building without the agency's permission, but a 1985 description of the site characterizes the bagel shop as still being located within the Stonewall site. A bar named Stonewall opened in 51 Christopher Street in 1987. New York City mayor Ed Koch proposed co-naming the stretch of Christopher Street outside Stonewall Inn as Stonewall Place in early 1989, and the New York City Council overwhelmingly approved the plan that April. The new street signs were installed at the beginning of that June. The bar at number 51 closed in 1989, upon which the sign on the building's facade was disassembled. By the early 1990s, the building at 51 Christopher Street had become a men's clothing store.

=== Revival at 53 Christopher Street ===
==== Reopening ====
A gay bar named New Jimmy's opened at the Stonewall site in May 1990, serving the city's growing outwardly LGBTQ+ community. (Note: AM New York Metro cites a conflicting reopening date of 1993.) The space was operated by Jimmy Pisano, a first-time bar owner who, according to his boyfriend Thomas Garguilo, was initially loath to name the bar "Stonewall" because of the sudden closure of the similarly named bar next door. Rather, Pisano initially named the bar after Jimmy Merry, who had taught him how to operate a bar. New Jimmy's occupied only the space at 53 Christopher Street and was unrelated to the original bar. Dominic DeSimone was hired to renovate the space; he wanted to restore the bar to its 1960s-era condition, but critics such as David Carter expressed concerns that the new operators wanted to exploit the bar's name for commercial purposes. A commemorative plaque was also installed outside the bar's entrance. In a contrast to the first iteration of the gay bar, the NYPD did not raid the revived Stonewall Inn, and gay officers sometimes even ordered drinks from the bar.

New Jimmy's was renamed Stonewall in 1991. During the early 1990s, Stonewall gained a poor reputation among neighborhood residents after several incidents in which the police were called to remove drug dealers there. Stonewall also suffered from low patronage due to competition from other taverns; according to DeSimone, Stonewall frequently did not see more than 50 or 60 patrons even on its busiest nights. Garguilo similarly said that the bar was often empty in the three years after it reopened. Pisano died of AIDS-related complications in early 1994, and Garguilo took over operation, as he wanted the bar to be open for the 25th anniversary of the Stonewall riots. According to Garguilo, so many people came to commemorate the riots' 25th anniversary that there was a line to take pictures of the bar. DeSimone and Pisano's business partner Bob Gurecki took over Stonewall in the mid-1990s.

==== DeSimone takeover ====
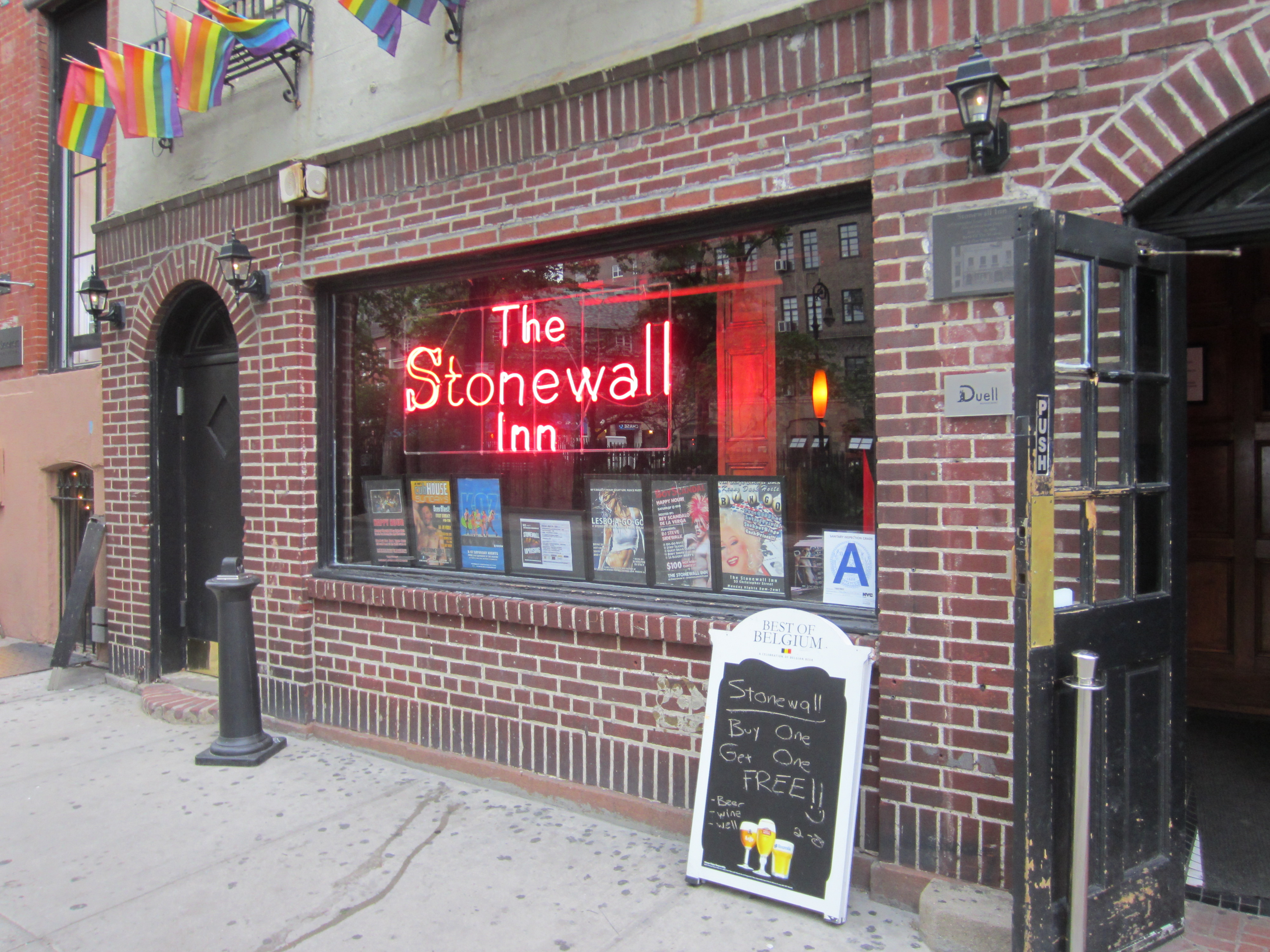
Storefront window in 2014

At the end of 1996, Ben Duell, who owned the building, refused to renew DeSimone's lease unless the latter agreed to expand the bar into the vacant second story. The space at 53 Christopher Street was renovated into a multi-floor nightclub at a cost of $200,000. it included a 95-seat bar room on the second floor. DeSimone needed a permit to operate a dance club within the bar, as it was less than 100 feet from a residential building, but the local Manhattan Community Board 2 unanimously voted against giving him a dance-club permit in early 1997. Despite not having a dance permit, DeSimone decided to open a dance floor on the second story in June 1997, prompting complaints from residents of the nearby condominium building at 45 Christopher Street. By 1999, number 51 was still a clothing store. The bar at number 53 sold souvenirs and was one of several remaining gay bars on the street.

The bar buildings were added to the National Register of Historic Places (NRHP) in 1999 and further designated as a National Historic Landmark in 2000. Due to repeated noise complaints, by the 2000s, patrons were required to enter through an adjacent building on Seventh Avenue South, rather than the main Christopher Street entrance. The city government charged the club's owners with several safety violations during this decade. According to one member of Manhattan Community Board 2, the owners were reportedly closing curtains (which was disallowed because the club held a New York state liquor license) and allowing sexually explicit shows inside.

By early 2006, Stonewall's beverage suppliers were suing its operators. The LGBTQ+ community generally either did not know the bar was open or were not interested in the events hosted there. In the bar itself, there were no indications of the riots that had taken place there, except for framed newspaper articles on the walls. The Pink News attributed the bar's decline to long-running resentment between different groups of patrons, but neglect, gross mismanagement, and noise complaints from neighbors were also cited as reasons for its downfall. The bar was forced to close again later in 2006 after losing its liquor license, and the storefront at number 53 was available for rent by that August. Stonewall's furnishings, such as bar stools, were placed on sale. At that point, Stonewall's monthly rent was $20,000, making it unlikely that it would reopen as a bar. Kurt Kelly, a local businessman who later helped take over the bar, said: "This is gay history. It's like abusing the Liberty Bell."

==== New management and visitor center ====
Around 2007, the bar was taken over by the businessmen Bill Morgan, Tony DeCicco, and Kurt Kelly, along with the bar's first lesbian investor, Stacy Lentz. Morgan told the LGBTQ+ newspaper PinkNews that "When we went looking for investors to save the Stonewall people came out of the woodwork. Gay and straight." An NPR reporter stated that the co-owners sought to renovate the bar to approximate its 1969 appearance, although they did not necessarily wish to operate the bar as a museum. The Stonewall Inn reopened in March 2007. Lentz hung a costume in the window to honor the actress Judy Garland, a gay icon who had died a few days before the riots; the costume resembled the dress worn by Garland's character Dorothy in the 1939 film The Wizard of Oz. Kelly said that, after the bar reopened, other bars nearby saw increased business. The bar recorded few issues, other than sporadic violent incidents. One commentator for the Gay and Lesbian Review, said in 2009 that the modern bar's "crowd veers toward a random mix of tourists, city kids, and bridge-and-tunnel gays" but that its symbolism was still important.

During the 2010s, the Stonewall Inn continued to attract regular customers, although a bartender described tourists as comprising most of the visitors. There was a gift shop behind the bar room. The neighboring structure, at 51 Christopher Street, was operating as a nail salon. The Duell family sold 51–53 Christopher Street and five other buildings in 2015 to a holding company associated with Alan Wasserman, which paid $57 million. After the Stonewall National Monument was established around the bar in 2016, the LGBTQ+–rights organization Pride Live tried to develop a visitor center for the monument. Pride Live began negotiating with the owner of 51 Christopher Street in 2019, as the storefront there had been vacated. One of the bar's longest-tenured staff members at the time—the bartender Tree Sequoia, who had been present during the riots—frequently told stories to visitors and is also Stonewall's international ambassador. One commentator described the bar in 2019 as displaying sponsorship banners above the entrance, while the vacant storefront at 53 Christopher Street contained posters decrying violence against LGBTQ+ people.

The bar closed temporarily in March 2020 during the COVID-19 pandemic in New York City, and Stonewall's owners unsuccessfully applied for a loan. Though the bar was allowed to start selling cocktails that June, it was in danger of closing permanently, so Kelly and Lentz launched two crowdfunding campaigns on GoFundMe; They raised at least $300,000 for the bar in one month, and the Gill Foundation provided another $250,000 in matching funds. Stonewall reopened in July 2020 with a limited capacity. The building at 51 Christopher Street was placed for sale in June 2021, but, after Pride Live and the owner of 51 Christopher Street came to an agreement, work on the visitor center there commenced in June 2022. MBB Architects designed the visitor center, and Local Projects was responsible for designing the exhibits. The visitor center opened on June 28, 2024, as the United States' first official national visitor center for LGBTQ+ culture. Numerous politicians and celebrities, including the singer Elton John and U.S. President Joe Biden, participated in the inauguration ceremonies, and the New York City Subway's Christopher Street–Sheridan Square station was renamed the Christopher Street–Stonewall station on the same day.

== Buildings ==
Location of the Stonewall Inn in relation to Greenwich Village
1 Stonewall Inn
2 Christopher Park
3 Sheridan Square

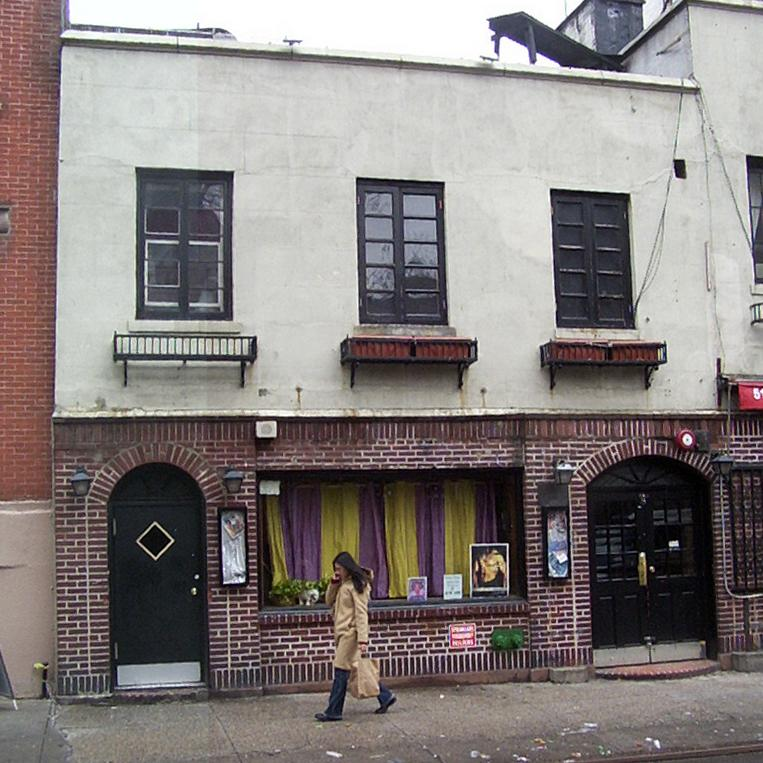
View of the facade of 53 Christopher Street in 2003

The first Stonewall Inn occupied a pair of repurposed horse stables at 51 and 53 Christopher Street, on the northern side of the street. The modern-day bar occupies only the structure at 53 Christopher Street. The neighboring building to the east, at 51 Christopher Street, opened in 2024 as the Stonewall National Monument's visitor center. Because the structures were developed separately, the roof of number 51 is slightly higher than that of number 53, and there is a party wall separating the buildings. The two buildings share a land lot with five other structures; as of 2022, these seven structures contained numerous storefronts and a combined 23 apartments.

Despite the bar's significance to the LGBTQ+ community, David W. Dunlap of The New York Times wrote: "An architectural monument, Stonewall is not". Ginia Bellafante wrote for the same newspaper in 2015 that the buildings were architecturally undistinguished but received an "A for meaning".

=== Surroundings ===
Directly south of the two structures is Christopher Park, a 0.19-acre (770 m^{2}; 8,300 ft^{2}) pocket park between Christopher, West 4th, and Grove streets. In tribute to the riots, the park has contained the Gay Liberation statue by George Segal since 1992. It also displayed a sculpture named A Love Letter to Marsha (a temporary tribute to the transgender activist Marsha P. Johnson, who was present during the riots) during 2021. The New York City Subway's Christopher Street–Stonewall station is next to the park. The station's artwork includes a triptych that depicts the riots, and the station itself was renamed after Stonewall National Monument in 2024.

A crosswalk at Christopher Street and Seventh Avenue South to the west, the closest intersection to the Stonewall Inn, has been painted in the colors of the LGBTQ+ rainbow flag since 2017. To the east, Christopher Street intersects Grove Street, Waverly Place (twice), (Note: Due to the irregular street grid, Waverly Place splits into two legs just south of Christopher Street. One leg continues northwest to the intersection of Christopher and Grove streets at an acute angle, while another travels north-northwest and intersects Christopher Street at a right angle.) and Gay Street. Parts of these roads are protected on the National Register of Historic Places along with the bar itself.

=== Exterior ===
On both buildings, the facade of the ground story is mostly made of brick, while the second floor is clad with stucco. The building at 53 Christopher Street is two stories high and divided vertically into three bays. At ground level, the center of number 53's facade contains a rectangular, 4-by-8-foot (1.2 by 2.4 m) storefront window with a brick windowsill, which in turn is flanked by arched entrances. The entrance to the left is a narrow semicircular arch. The entrance to the right is a segmental arch, with wooden double doors. On the second story, the stucco facade is scored horizontally, and there is a rectangular iron flower-box holder beneath each of the three windows. By the 21st century, a neon sign with the bar's name was ordinarily placed in the window, while pride flags were hung on the facade.

The building at 51 Christopher Street is two stories high (previously three), with a one-story rear annex, and is four bays wide. At ground level, the left half of number 51's facade contains a rectangular, 4-by-8-foot (1.2 by 2.4 m) storefront window with a brick windowsill, similar to the window at number 53. Immediately to the right is a segmental arch, with a fanlight above wooden double doors. The bay furthest to the right has a stucco facade at ground level, with a rectangular door leading to the second floor. On the second story, the stucco facade is scored horizontally, and there is a curved iron flower-box holder beneath each of the four windows. At the time of the 1969 riots, the second floor of number 51 had a vertical sign, though this has since been removed. There was also a stoop at 51 Christopher Street's entrance, which was removed when the building became a visitor center.

=== Interior ===
==== Original gay bar ====
Layout of the Stonewall Inn, 1969

When the Stonewall Inn was turned into an LGBTQ+ bar, the bar was split into two primary rooms, one in each building. The bar had almost no decoration and scant lighting, and what little decoration did exist was destroyed on the first day of the Stonewall riots. Aside from black paint, the spaces had temporary wooden bars. According to a description of the bar from the 1960s, the decoration was so sparse that it looked "to have only recently been converted from a garage into a cabaret in about eight hours and at a cost of under fifty dollars".

Originally, service spaces such as the coat room were placed at the front of the bar, likely to limit outsiders' views of the interior. Visitors entered straight into a tiny vestibule. There was an office or coat check to the left of the main entrance, immediately behind the front window of 53 Christopher Street. (Note: Carter 2004, p. 72, says that there was a coat check to the left of the vestibule. National Park Service 2000, p. 11, states that there was an office to the left and a coat check ahead.) A wishing well was found just inside the doorway. The main bar room was to the right, within 51 Christopher Street, through a doorway and down a single step. The main room had a long bar with narrow stools, and there was a dance floor at the rear. Swinging doors led from the main room, up one step, to the back room at 53 Christopher Street. The back room contained a bar at its rear. Toward the rear of the bar were the men's and women's restrooms, which had doors from both the main and back rooms.

==== Later configuration ====
The interior of the original Stonewall Inn was divided into two spaces and redesigned after the original bar closed. The bar at 53 Christopher Street, and the visitor center at 51 Christopher Street, function as separate entities. 53 Christopher Street largely retains its original layout, but the finishes have been completely replaced. The ground floor's interior decorations include a mirror occupying one wall, as well as wood paneling along the other walls. A 2009 article on the bar characterized it as a nondescript space with stools and a pool table. There is also a side room with red lighting. Inside is the National LGBTQ+ Wall of Honor, which was established in 2019 to honor notable LGBTQ+ individuals. The modern bar has contained a variety of pride flags; banknotes collected from foreign visitors; pictures and newspaper clippings about the riots; and a sign indicating that the bar had been raided.

The second story of the revived bar includes a room with a capacity of 150 people; this dance floor has a stage, a disco ball, seats with leopard print upholstery, and velour curtains. A New York magazine article described the dance floor as having a "bar mitzvah vibe" because of its decoration. According to a 2019 account, there was also a basement performance space.

51 Christopher Street has been converted into a 3,700-square-foot (340 m^{2}) visitor center, containing interactive displays and exhibits about the bar and national monument. The visitor center includes a "content story wall" with information about people involved in the riot, a 1960s jukebox similar to the one used in the original bar, and a theater-like space with golden shovels bearing the names of the visitor center's sponsors. There is also artwork, as well as information about the history of the building and the riots. The visitor center also includes restrooms and space for park rangers. The interior of the visitor center is decorated in white, and the doorway to the existing bar at 53 Christopher Street has been bricked up. One observer for the magazine Fast Company said the visitor center "makes Stonewall a sanitary, consumable story", while The New York Times art critic Holland Cotter wrote of the visitor center's "informational softness".

== Drinks ==
The modern Stonewall Inn serves only drinks and not food. The drinks that have been served at the bar have included Off the Wall, a pomegranate-and-lime-juice cocktail. The bar's official beer is Brooklyn Brewery's Stonewall Inn IPA, a lemon and grapefruit IPA that is 4.5% alcohol by volume. Co-owner Stacy Lentz said in 2021 that she mainly wanted to sell beer brands made by LGBTQ+-friendly companies, including Brooklyn Brewery, Gay Beer, and Dyke Beer. The bar stopped selling Anheuser-Busch brands such as Bud Light in 2021 because of Anheuser-Busch's donations to numerous politicians who had introduced anti-LGBTQ+ legislation. Bud Light had been among the most popular beer brands sold at the bar when Stonewall stopped selling it.

A Condé Nast Traveler review from 2009 described the beverages as "unfussy and mainstream". Time Out and New York rank the bar's drinks as being moderately priced. The Telegraph wrote in 2018: "All that said, Stonewall is a fine place to sip a vodka soda and meet new friends."

== Events ==
The modern Stonewall Inn has hosted a variety of local music artists, drag shows, trivia nights, cabaret, karaoke, private parties, and same-sex wedding receptions. The bar hosts regular events such as karaoke and drag bingo to attract regular customers. Stonewall also hosted "big gay happy hours" and screened black-and-white films near the main bar room. Time Out New York described the bar in 2021 as being frequented by tourists during the day, while hosting dance parties at night. Kelly, Morgan, and Lentz have also presented fundraising events for LGBTQ+ nonprofit organizations. The bar has hosted celebrity performances such as those by Madonna in 2018 and Taylor Swift in 2019, as well as visits from other figures such as U.S. Vice President Kamala Harris in 2023.

A public rally in front of the Stonewall Inn celebrating the passage of the Marriage Equality Act in 2011

By the 21st century, the Stonewall Inn frequently served as a gathering place for the LGBTQ+ community, especially after major events that affected LGBTQ+ people. These included celebrations in 2011, after the Marriage Equality Act legalized same-sex marriage in New York state; in 2013, after the U.S. Supreme Court decided in United States v. Windsor to recognize same-sex marriage on the federal level; and in 2015, after the Supreme Court decided in Obergefell v. Hodges to repeal all state bans on same-sex marriage. People have also convened at the bar following negative events. For example, it served as a memorial after dozens of gay men were killed in the 2016 Pulse nightclub shooting, and people protested at the bar in response to anti-LGBTQ+ actions taken by the first and second administrations of U.S. President Donald Trump. The bar has been the site of other LGBTQ+-related events, such as a 2014 announcement by U.S. interior secretary Sally Jewell on LGBTQ+ historic sites and a 2015 gay marriage ceremony. Politicians have used the bar for campaign events, such as when New York City Councilwoman Christine Quinn ran in the 2013 New York City mayoral election.

== Advocacy ==
After Lentz took over the bar, she organized several events in support of LGBTQ+ rights, such as a 2013 rally for the legalization of same-sex marriage outside the bar. In 2017, Stonewall co-owners Bill Morgan, Stacy Lentz, and Kurt Kelly established the Stonewall Inn Gives Back Initiative, a nonprofit LGBTQ+-rights advocacy organization. The organization has received proceeds from the sale of the Stonewall Inn IPA and the sale of objects commemorating the Stonewall riots' 50th anniversary. Stonewall Inn Gives Back Initiative has hosted events such as a 2020 concert co-hosted by German alcohol brand Jägermeister to raise money for nightlife workers. Since 2023, the organization has presented the Stonewall Inn Brick Awards Gala, an event honoring LGBTQ+ community leaders.

Stonewall Inn Gives Back Initiative also operates a program through which LGBTQ+-friendly events could be designated as "safe spaces". Developed in conjunction with six LGBTQ+ groups, by 2023, the program had been translated into multiple languages and was being implemented in other countries.

== Impact ==
=== Aftermath of the riots ===
Although the Stonewall riots were not the first LGBTQ+ protests, they were widely considered a watershed event for the gay liberation movement. Many subsequent studies of LGBTQ+ history in the U.S. were divided into pre- and post-Stonewall analyses. Many aspects of gay and lesbian culture from before the riots, such as bar culture formed from decades of shame and secrecy, were forcefully ignored and denied, and people became less afraid of being openly LGBTQ+. The American LGBTQ+ community become more visible following the riots, and wider acceptance of the LGBTQ+ community led to the repeal of many anti-LGBTQ+ laws and regulations. Even after the closure of the bar, the Stonewall riots also inspired activist movements around the U.S. Within two years of the riots, gay-rights groups had been founded all over the U.S., such as the Gay Liberation Front and Street Transvestite Action Revolutionaries. The riots also inspired the creation of organizations such as the Lesbian Herstory Archives. According to The New York Times, the riots may have influenced gay bars' design, as later gay bars tended to have areas where sexual contact was encouraged.

==== Neighborhood impact ====
In part because of the riots at the Stonewall Inn, LGBTQ+ businesses began to congregate around Christopher Street. By the early 1970s, other LGBTQ+ businesses had opened along the street, even as the bar itself had closed. A commentator for The Advocate wrote in 1972 that the riots had succeeded in associating Christopher Street's name with LGBTQ+ culture, while a 1982 Washington Post article described the street, and particularly the bar's site, as the "birthplace of the gay rights movement in this country".

The bar itself became a symbol of the LGBTQ+ community. The New York Times said in 1999 that the Stonewall Inn was "a powerful symbol of resistance". The Stonewall Inn has been contrasted with Julius Bar one block away (where LGBTQ+ activists staged sit-ins during the 1960s). For example, the Washington Post wrote in 1994 that Stonewall "seems to belong to another era, one that made the notion of protesting in neckties ludicrous", while The New York Times described Stonewall in 1999 as having more-radical patrons compared with Julius's. The bar is also a tourist attraction, with thousands of annual visitors. The New York City government advertised the bar as a destination for people visiting LGBTQ+ cultural sites in 2009, and Stonewall has also been included on walking tours of LGBTQ+ sites.

==== Commemorations ====
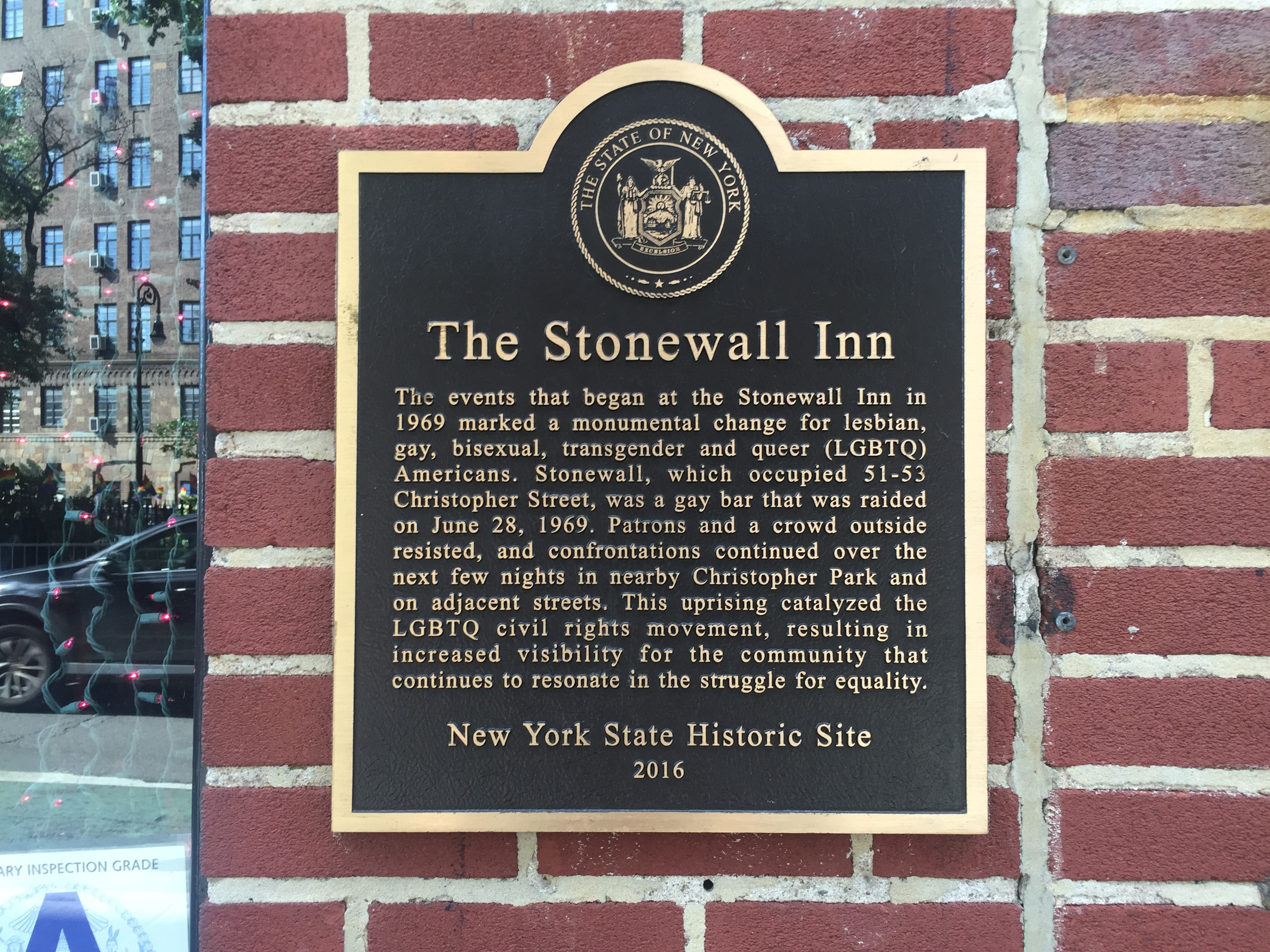
Plaque at the Stonewall Inn commemorating the Stonewall riots

Christopher Street Liberation Day, on June 28, 1970, marked the first anniversary of the Stonewall riots; it, along with other events hosted the same day in other cities, was the first Gay Pride march in U.S. history. The Pride march became the inspiration for gay pride parades in the United States and in many other countries. A Gay Pride march has been hosted in New York City on the final Sunday of June since the first parade in 1970, and the city government has declared June as Pride Month since 1979. Participants in each year's parade typically passed by the Stonewall site to pray and take pictures. Over a million people attended a parade commemorating the 25th anniversary of the riots in 1994; although the main parade did not pass by the Stonewall Inn, a smaller, unofficial group did march near the bar.

As part of the Stonewall 45 exhibit in 2014, which commemorated the 45th anniversary of the riots, the Arcus Foundation and Greenwich Village Society for Historic Preservation (GVSHP) placed posters in the windows of businesses on Christopher Street, including the Stonewall Inn. After the creation of the Stonewall National Monument in 2016, Google.org donated $1 million toward a program to preserve the bar's history; this became the Stonewall Forever interactive web app, launched in 2019. The bar hosted a rally as part of the Stonewall 50 – WorldPride NYC 2019 event, which took place a half-century after the riots and, with 5 million spectators, was the largest international Pride celebration in history at the time.

=== Landmark designations ===
==== Historic district and early proposals ====
Both of the Christopher Street buildings are part of the New York City Landmarks Preservation Commission's Greenwich Village Historic District, designated in April 1969, and are also part of a National Register of Historic Places district with the same name. Though the historic district designations provided partial protection to the buildings, they could still be renovated or demolished with the LPC's approval. As early as 1973, the Gay Activists Alliance had advocated for the exterior of the bar to be designated as an individual city landmark. Seventh-day Adventist Kinship International, a support group for LGBTQ+ members of the Seventh-day Adventist Church, indicated in 1985 that it would seek to have the buildings added to the NRHP as individual landmarks.

==== National and city designations ====
In early 1999, thirty years after the riots, the GVSHP and the Organization of Lesbian and Gay Architects and Designers jointly nominated the bar for inclusion on the NRHP. The historian Andrew Dolkart, who prepared the NRHP nomination, included Christopher Park and the surrounding streets in the nomination because of their role in the riots; the officers who had raided the bar were unfamiliar with Greenwich Village's irregular street grid, so they simply chased the crowd down these streets. The Stonewall Inn and surrounding area was formally listed on the NRHP on June 25, 1999. The NRHP designation still did not fully protect the buildings from demolition, but the designation was nonetheless unusual, as sites were generally not added to the NRHP until at least 50 years after their period of historical significance had elapsed. The area was designated a National Historic Landmark in March 2000, a label that, at the time, was given to just three percent of all NRHP sites. David Carter compared the NRHP–designated streets to an "important battlefield" in 2002, saying that "you don't want to alter any part of it".

The GVSHP began advocating for Stonewall to be designated as an individual city landmark in January 2014, following the demolition of a showroom on Park Avenue, as the group wanted the buildings' appearance to be preserved. The LPC agreed to consider designating the bar in May 2015; the Real Estate Board of New York was among the supporters of the designation. The LPC voted on June 23, 2015, to protect Stonewall as a city landmark, which was confirmed by the New York City Council later that year. Stonewall was, at the time, one of 50 city landmarks selected specifically for its symbolism, out of the city's 33,000 landmarked structures. The designation preserved the buildings' appearance but did not mandate that they continue to be used as a bar.

On June 24, 2016, President Obama designated the Stonewall Inn as part of the Stonewall National Monument (video).

Efforts to designate the Stonewall Inn as a U.S. national monument began in the 2010s, and three U.S. Congress members from New York formally proposed designating the buildings as a national monument in late 2015. There were numerous attempts to install a commemorative plaque or a statue on or near the bar buildings, but these efforts received criticisms for failing to sufficiently acknowledge nonwhite or transgender people. Politicians and activists supported the national monument designation, and New York Governor Andrew Cuomo signed legislation to allow the National Park Service to take over the nearby Christopher Park, though the bar buildings remained privately owned. On June 24, 2016, Cuomo named the Stonewall Inn as a State Historic Site, and U.S. President Barack Obama established a 7.7-acre (3.11 ha) area around the bar as the Stonewall National Monument. Stacy Lentz supported both the city landmark and the national monument designations, calling them important for LGBTQ+ history.

Stonewall was both the first LGBTQ+ cultural site ever added to the NRHP and the first official New York City landmark to be designated specifically based on its LGBTQ+ cultural significance. In addition, the Stonewall National Monument was the first U.S. national monument designated around an LGBTQ+ historic site. Following Stonewall's designation as a city landmark, the LPC sought to designate other LGBTQ+ cultural sites, such as the Audre Lorde Residence and the LGBTQ+ Community Center. Other LGBTQ+-related sites were added to the NRHP following Stonewall's designation, including Julius Bar, James Baldwin Residence, and Caffe Cino in New York City. As of 2023, it was one of 28 NRHP sites nationwide that had been designated specifically because of their LGBTQ+ history, out of over 90,000 total NRHP listings.

=== Namesakes and media ===
The Stonewall Inn and the subsequent riots inspired the creation of various LGBTQ+-themed works of art, such as music, literature, and visual and performing arts. St. Martin's Press launched a label for LGBTQ+ books, Stonewall Inn Editions, in 1987; the label was discontinued in 2002. Other things have been named for the bar and riots, including an LGBTQ+ retirement home in Massachusetts, an LGBT+-rights organization in Salt Lake City, the British LGBTQ+-rights group Stonewall, and a multi-city sports league. Thomas Garguilo, the bar's onetime operator, also created a Facebook page and a website about the bar's history.

No newsreel or TV footage was taken of the riots, and contemporary news articles did not describe the riot in detail, nor was it reported widely. Some reporters, such as Fred W. McDarrah of The Village Voice and Joseph Ambrosini of the New York Daily News, took a limited number of pictures of the riots and the bar itself. Additional images of the bar during the riots' final day were published in 2009. The few home movies and photographs that do exist have been used in documentaries.

The bar itself was described in various works of print media, often in association with the riots. For example, Edmund White's 1988 semi-autobiographical novel The Beautiful Room is Empty includes a first-hand account of him unintentionally encountering the Stonewall riots. Martin Duberman's 1993 book Stonewall describes the bar and the events leading up to the riots, and David Carter published a book about the bar's history, Stonewall: The Riots That Sparked the Gay Revolution, in 2004 for the 35th anniversary of the riots. The bar was the subject of Garguilo's 2018 novel Stonewall Revival: Tales Of 53 Christopher Street. and it was described in WNET's 2001 television special A Walk in Greenwich Village. The riots were depicted in movies and theater as well, such as the 1995 comedy film Stonewall, the 2010 documentary Stonewall (which was based on Carter's book), the 2012 play Hit the Wall, and the 2015 drama film Stonewall.

== See also ==
- LGBTQ+ culture in New York City
- List of LGBTQ+ bars
- List of National Historic Landmarks in New York City
- List of national monuments of the United States
- List of New York City Designated Landmarks in Manhattan below 14th Street
- National Register of Historic Places listings in Manhattan below 14th Street
- NYC Pride March
- Transgender culture of New York City
