= Homosexuality and Seventh-day Adventism =

In Seventh-day Adventism, homosexual behaviour is considered a violation of God's commands, and as such, openly homosexual behaviour is subject to church discipline. "Gay and lesbian members who choose to be, and remain, sexually abstinent should not be given the opportunity to participate in all church activities including leadership positions in the Church. Those who struggle with temptation to sin should be treated the same way as other members who struggle with sexual sin (Matt 18:4; Mark 2:17; Luke 5:31; 19:10). We strongly affirm that homosexual persons have a place in the Seventh-day Adventist Church." The Church's opposition to same-gender sexual practices and relationships is on the grounds that "sexual intimacy belongs only within the marital relationship of a man and a woman." The Church believes the Bible consistently affirms the pattern of heterosexual monogamy, and all sexual relations outside the scope of heterosexual marriage are contrary to God's original plan.

Adventist Peace Fellowship brings together 10 LGBTQ affirming churches in 2 countries in 2025, but does not support blessings of same-sex marriage.

== History ==
When a proposal came before the California legislature in April 2004 to legalize marriage for same-sex couples, Adventist church members were urged to contact their representatives and voice their opposition. [citation needed] In the September/October, 2004 issue of church periodical, Liberty, which was devoted to the issue of gay marriage, the religious liberty director called for the church not to remain silent in opposing gay rights. In "The Liberty Blog" the Adventist Church's religious liberty director for North America argued against the proposed federal "Local Law Enforcement Hate Crimes Prevention Act of 2007," suggesting it could have an indirect impact on free speech, would give special protection to some crime victims while failing to cover others, would be unnecessary since local laws already provide protection against hate crimes, and could lead to marginalizing those who oppose homosexual practice. In October 2015 the Adventist Church published a statement of its acceptance of homosexually-inclined members who abstain from openly homosexual behaviour in accordance with the Bible [see "Church statements regarding homosexuality" below].

== Church statements regarding homosexuality ==
Official statements:

- "An Understanding of the Biblical View on Homosexual Practice and Pastoral Care", voted 2015
- "Safeguarding Mission in Changing Social Environments", voted 2007
- "Seventh-day Adventist Response to Same-Sex Unions--A Reaffirmation of Christian Marriage", voted 2004
- "Seventh-day Adventist Position Statement on Homosexuality", voted 1999
- "A Statement of Concern on Sexual Behavior", voted 1987

See also "An Affirmation of Marriage", voted 1996, and "Marriage and the Family", doctrine number 22 in Seventh-day Adventists Believe—A Biblical Exposition of 27 Fundamental Doctrines.

According to the Seventh-day Adventist Church Manual, one reason for church discipline includes, "Such violations as fornication, promiscuity, incest, homosexual practice, sexual abuse of children and vulnerable adults, and other sexual perversions, and the remarriage of a divorced person, except of the spouse who has remained faithful to the marriage vow in a divorce for adultery or for sexual perversions."

== Independent Church ministries ==
The Seventh-day Adventist Church was involved with Colin Cook's Homosexuals Anonymous in the 1980s, but have since withdrawn their funding support after Cook's scandal and subsequent resignation in 1986. Some independent ministries which support the Adventist Church such as 3ABN and Amazing Facts have been supporting a ministry known as Coming Out Ministries, run by a number of ex-gay people, including Michael Carducci and Wayne Blakely, who have now been celibate for a number of years, and a pastor who is now in a heterosexual marriage, Ron Woolsey.

== Uganda Controversy ==
On December 17, 2012, the Ugandan daily newspaper New Vision published an article reporting that the regional president of the Adventist Church for Eastern and Central Africa, Blaisious Ruguri, had delivered a speech at the Mbarara Church in which he declared that Adventists "fully" supported the government's "Anti-Homosexuality Bill" (which criminalized same-sex intimacy with lengthy prison terms and demanded the death penalty for repeat offenders. The article, which includes a photo of Ruguri standing alongside state MP Medard Bitekyerezo, quotes Ruguri saying:

"Our stand is 'zero tolerance' to this vice and to western influence on this crucial issue because God says no to it. We are together with the President and the Speaker and we fully support the Anti-Homosexuality Bill. I call upon all religious ministers, all Ugandans, and all Africans to say no to Homosexuality. Let us stand for our sovereignty as Ugandans and as God-fearing people even the heavens fall."

On December 19, the president of Kinship International, Yolanda Elliott, sent a letter to the Adventist Church's global leader, then-President Ted Wilson, and to the Church's top public relations officer at the time, Garret Caldwell, that read in part:

"Through Pr. Ruguri’s statements and the Adventist church’s continued membership in the Inter-Religious Council of Uganda, the church is now justifying the prosecution, imprisonment, and potential execution of Ugandan LGBT people and their families. As Adventists, and regardless of the church’s statements on human sexuality, we believe that the Seventh-day Adventist Church should never stand for the violation of basic human rights. The recent End It Now campaign is just the latest example of our church’s track record of standing against violence and abuse. Because of that track record, we do not accept that one of the church’s top-ranking leaders can support legalized violence against a minority group or use the pulpits and authority of the worldwide church to do so."

On December 21, the global Adventist Church's news agency, ANNissued a press release saying that the New Vision article did not "convey an accurate representation of his [Ruguri's] intentions or the voted position of the denomination regarding homosexuality." The release quoted Ruguri declaring he had no knowledge of the contents of the Anti-Homosexuality Bill and that the newspaper had misrepresented his actual views:

"It is unfortunate that the media took the liberty to extend my statements to suggest what I did not say or imply. I have never seen that bill. Mine was a general statement to disapprove of homosexual practice and behavior. Our church is a ministry of mercy, and as a minister in the Seventh-day Adventist Church I cannot condemn homosexuals to death or to hell."

== Jamaican Adventist Politicians and Criminalization of Homosexuality ==
In July 2012, Human Rights Watch sent a letter to Jamaica's newly elected Prime Minister, Portia Simpson-Miller, urging her to take stronger action than her predecessors to protect the basic human rights of homosexuals in the country. According to HRW, in the eight years since its 2004 report, "Hated to Death: Homophobia, Violence, and Jamaica's HIV/AIDs Epidemic," "attacks on homosexual people or people perceived as being homosexual or transgender appear to remain commonplace." Jamaica is widely described by rights organizations as among the most dangerous places in the world to be a homosexual, with the authorities often turning a blind eye to assaults and murders of gays, lesbians, and their allies. With more than a quarter of a million Seventh-day Adventists, Jamaica also has among the highest percentages of Adventists of any country in the world. Approximately 10% of all Jamaicans are Adventist. Numerous Adventists have served in prominent positions in government.

In a November 2011 interview with a Jamaican newspaper, The Gleaner, Seventh-day Adventist and then-Prime Minister Andrew Holness rejected calls from Britain's Prime Minister David Cameron that he repeal Jamaica's "anti-buggery" laws, which criminalize same-sex intimacy with jail times of up to 10 years. Holness served as Prime Minister of Jamaica from October 2011 until January 2012, when he was succeeded by Simpson-Miller.

During the 2011 election debates, Holness and Simpson-Miller were both asked whether they would be willing to include homosexuals in their cabinets. Simpson-Miller replied that "Our administration believes in protecting human rights of all Jamaicans. No one should be discriminated against because of their sexual orientation...people should be appointed to positions based on their ability to manage." Holness, by contrast, made clear that he would not permit homosexuals to serve in his government as long as the public remained hostile to gay rights. "My sentiments reflect the sentiments of the country," he said. "The prime minister has a discretion, but that discretion can not be exercised in a vacuum."

In August 2013, the Seventh-day Adventist Church in Jamaica published an article on its website under the heading "Same-sex marriage is not a human rights issue", stating that the denomination in Jamaica has "been very strident in its opposition of any softening or repealing of the buggery law."

Another prominent Jamaican Adventist and politician who has spoken against gay rights is Governor-General Sir Patrick Allen. In a November 2012 address, he urged his countrymen to follow the example of the biblical prophet Nehemiah, who demonstrated "zero tolerance of corruption and determined action to stamp it out." Allen lamented "a significant change for the worse...what is referred to as the 'new norm.' The trend began with the banning of prayer in schools and later, in state institutions in the former bastion of Christianity, the USA, under the banner of freedom of religion." He continued, "There is mounting pressure on states such as Jamaica to recognize specific rights for lesbians and gays, with even threat of withholding financial assistance from those who do not." According to Allen, however, "there is nothing wrong with Jamaica which cannot be fixed by what is right with Jamaica."

== The Netherlands Union Conference ==
The Netherlands Union Conference has encouraged all of the churches under their conference to be a safe place to go and discouraged church in the Netherlands Union Conference due to concerns about the safety of LGBT individuals. "Although we acknowledge the biblical ideal of a monogamous, heterosexual relationship, we continue to emphasise that it is an ideal. The basis of Christianity is that all people fall short of God's ideal; this is why we require God's grace and Christ's sacrifice. This leads to the conclusion that we, as Christians, must welcome all children of God – who all fall short of God's ideal – into our churches with love."

== The Southern Ghana Union Conference ==
In the raising debate on the legalization of the anti-LGBTQI+ bill in Ghana, the Southern Ghana Union Conference have joined the debate about the anti-LGBTQI+ bill with a call for the passage of the bill into law. In a letter signed by the Adventist Church's regional president, Dr. Thomas Techie Ocran, the church stated that homosexuality is an aberration of nature and a sin that requires the practitioners to be saved. As a result, they declared their support for the measure's passage into law and urged all well-meaning Ghanaians to support it. The bill is currently on the table for consideration and adoption in Parliament.

== Andrews University ==
Andrews University, the Adventist Church's flagship university and home to the Seventh-day Adventist Theological Seminary, has been put on the Anti-LGBTQ+ Shame List due to the cupcake controversy, which stopped a bake sale of students who wanted to help Project Fierce with the students, saying that this is not about theology. Andrews University's response was that while they value LGBTQ+ people and recognize that probably 40% of homeless people identify as LGBTQ+, they oppose perceived LGBTQ+ advocacy of same-sex relationships. Aull4One has raised $17,480 for Project Fierce outside of Andrews university campus and has raised money online; LGBTQ+ students were divided on the controversy.

== See also ==
- Homosexuality and Christianity
- Seventh-day Adventist Kinship International
- Gary Chartier
