= The Chickens and the Bulls =

1960s American extortion ring

The Chickens and the Bulls (called 'Operation Homex' by the FBI) refers to an extortion ring that preyed on prominent, closeted, gay men in the 1960s. Corrupt police officers and police impersonators known as 'Bulls', used young, often underage boys called 'chickens' to blackmail wealthy or important closeted men across the country. Over nearly a decade the ring victimized thousands, including "a navy admiral, two generals, a U.S. congressman, a prominent surgeon, an Ivy League professor, a prep school headmaster, and several well-known actors, singers, and television personalities" This went on until 1966 when Manhattan DA Frank Hogan announced that the ring had been broken up, after "at least 2 million dollars had been taken."

== Methods of Operation ==
The ring consisted of small groups of chickens and bulls. The chickens were young male prostitutes who waited outside bars to be approached, or in some cases identified potential marks and seduced them. After making contact, they would accompany the mark to a hotel room and get him into a compromising position while waiting for their partners to arrive.

The bulls would then burst into the room wearing full police gear, sometimes even with authentic badges, and explain the penalties for violating sodomy laws or corrupting a minor. The extortionists would then demand payment, either as a bribe or as "bail" to avoid making the arrest public.

Alternatively, the chickens could merely rob their marks, keeping any money and passing the mark's personal information on to the extortionists who would then determine whether or not that person was worth further attention. Those who were would then be approached by a police impersonator, using the mark's ID as proof that he had been involved in homosexual activities, and told that they would have to pay to keep their homosexuality secret.

Sometimes, rather than threatening marks, the extortionists would tell them that they had to testify in court about a prostitution ring, but that if they paid "bail money," someone else could be released to testify instead. When dealing with high-profile targets, this method was often more effective than attempting to bully them.

== Police Investigation ==
The official investigation of the extortion ring began with a few scattered reports of police impersonation and a handful of anonymous letters regarding homosexual extortion. As the NYPD division devoted to organized crime activity was connecting these incidents, one specific arrest revealed the true scope of the ring. Detailed in William McGowan's article on the subject:

"July 1965, Detective 3rd Grade James McDonnell received a call in the upstairs squad room of midtown Manhattan's 17th Precinct. There was a man at the Western Union office in Grand Central Station who might be impersonating a police detective, he was told. The man was in the company of a 14-year-old runaway and had contacted the boy's father in Texas to wire plane fare so the son could fly home. The father had grown suspicious when the man had asked for $150—twice the needed amount."

The man McDonnell met in that Western Union office appeared to be a NYPD member, but a quick conversation with him revealed that the man, John Aitken, had an arrest record and had been trying to use the boy in a robbery scheme. Aitken's subsequent interrogation revealed that "he had knowledge of an extortion ring that had shaken down dozens of prominent closeted homosexual men across the country—most of them married and with families."

The amount of effort that the police put into this investigation was rare for any crimes involving homosexuals as the police force as a whole was rather homophobic in the 1960s. Homosexuality was still illegal in most states, but in this case the police set aside their own prejudices, most likely because of the involvement of police impersonators.

== Ringleaders ==
There were three main ringleaders financing and overseeing operations across the country: John Pyne, a Chicago police department member who learned about blackmail from those he arrested. Sherman Chadwick Kaminsky and Elwood Lee Hammock were the final ringleaders and primary extortionists, responsible for the legwork and day-to-day operations.

In his 50s at the time of the extortion ring, John J. Pyne worked for the Chicago Police Department as a member of their Confidential Squad, responsible for dealing with cases of blackmail and other racketeering. In the mid-1960s, Pyne was on sick leave on and off over a period of 2–3 years. During this time he was responsible for furnishing the extortionists with fake police badges, warrants, travel money, and attorneys among other things. Additionally he was responsible for finding potential high-profile targets. In short, He was the primary overseer of the operation and masterminded the extortion ring.

Sherman Chadwick Kaminsky and Elwood Lee Hammock were Pyne's chief extortionists. Once caught, they revealed the full scope of the operation and helped the FBI take down Pyne. In an interview, Paul Brana, an FBI agent who worked on the case, spoke about the arrests. "Once that Kaminsky was arrested by me the second time, he became extensively cooperative. He was telling me about all of the extortions that he had committed in the United States." This led to Pyne receiving multiple prison sentences totaling ten years.

Edward Francis "Skull" Murphy was investigated for his involvement with the operation with speculation that he was a high-level member. He was indicted and charged with extortion, but never prosecuted.

== Victims ==
There were thousands of victims, but a large number of these were merely targets of opportunity. Additionally, very few victims came forward on their own, and only a small number of these people were willing to sign formal complaints. Names of victims came primarily from extortionists arrested by police, and many of these victims denied it due to the fear that the extortionists would make good on their threats, either to out the victims, or to go after their families. In many cases, the victims believed that they had been targeted by actual police officers, further discouraging them from coming forward.

Among those confirmed, high-profile, victims were New Jersey congressman Peter Frelinghuysen Jr., and Admiral William Church, among several other government officials, a prominent surgeon, and a famous British producer.

== See also ==
- Badger game
