= Edward Francis "Skull" Murphy =

American professional wrestler, bouncer, and criminal (1926-1989)

Ed "Skull" Murphy
- Born: Edward Francis Murphy; March 3, 1926; New York City
- Died: January 10, 1989 (aged 62); Manhattan, New York
- Other names: Ed "Skull" Murphy, Ed "The Skull" Murphy, Eddie "Skull" Murphy, Ed "Mother" Murphy
- Known for: The Chickens and the Bulls involvement, gay activism
- Status: released
- Criminal charges: Armed robbery, extortion, blackmail
- Penalty: 10 years in prison

Details
- Span of crimes: 1935–1970s

Edward Francis "Skull" Murphy (1926–1989) was a bouncer, mob boss, and gay activist. He was the bouncer at the Stonewall Inn in Greenwich Village the night of the infamous Stonewall Riots, June 28, 1969. He is a controversial figure in the gay rights movement of the 1960s due to his involvement in a prominent extortion ring, The Chickens and the Bulls, that targeted gay men.

== Early life and career ==
Murphy was born in Greenwich Village to Irish and Italian parents. He previously attended Catholic school, but was expelled and put into reform school after his assault on a police officer.

Murphy enlisted into the army in 1943, serving one tour in France during World War II. After returning to New York in 1946 after the end of the War, he served as a bouncer at various gay bars in New York City, including the Stonewall Inn in Greenwich Village, which was then controlled by the Genovese crime family. Murphy was also involved with the Colombo crime family.

He often cared for, and sometimes pimped, young gay runaways that sought shelter at the gay bars that employed him, earning him the moniker Ed "Mother" Murphy. These young gay runaways often had to turn to sex work to survive after fleeing their homes. Sex work was common in gay spaces in the 1960s, and most "regulars" at the Stonewall Inn were sex workers.

During his time as a bouncer, he also had a short-lived career as a wrestler, donning the moniker the "Villainous Skull Murphy" for his heel character. In his two years as a wrestler, he fought notable wrestlers like The Super Swedish Angel and Gorgeous George.

== Crimes ==
The earliest documented crime that Murphy committed was at 9 years old, where he hit a police officer over the head with a milk bottle for breaking his shoebox. He later was arrested in 1947 and jailed for 10 years (Note: There is some contention as to the actual amount of time that he was sentenced and served. Some sources have mentioned him only serving 5 years, others mentioning 10 or 13 years.) after a spree of armed robberies targeting dentists offices for gold used in fillings.

=== The Chickens and the Bulls ===
The The Chickens and the Bulls was a massive, inter-state operation during the 1960s that exploited gay men. The operation worked with "chickens," typically trafficked young gay men who were sex workers and people impersonating law enforcement officers, or "bulls." The "chickens" would lure the victim to a second location, like a hotel room, and get the victim into a compromising situation for blackmail purposes. Then, the "bulls" would bust into the hotel room and "catch" the victim in the act of sodomy or illegal gay activity, or the "chicken" would brutalize the victim, stealing their money and identification materials for subsequent blackmail.

As the "door manager" for the Stonewall Inn, Murphy maintained a list of the Inn's clientele, allegedly later used as the targets and provided some "chickens," or young gay male sex workers, for the operation. One of his alleged "chicken" victims was a young Puerto Rican gay man, Tano. (Note: Another source mentioned Tano as his boyfriend, although there is no information to confirm this claim.) The operation mainly targeted prominent and powerful closeted gay men, potentially including workers on Wall Street, with investigation from the FBI culminating in the infamous Stonewall riots on June 28, 1969. He was arrested and cuffed to a drag queen named Blond Frankie, but escaped that same night.

Murphy was indicted for his involvement in the Chickens and the Bulls ring and charged with extortion. He pled guilty, but no prosecution ensued. There is speculation that his involvement in the ring gave him invaluable information on the names of prominent victims, (Note: Victims that were part of this speculation were J. Edgar Hoover and Clyde Tolson due to previous existing suspicions of their relationship and high-ranking status in law enforcement. These claims have not been substantiated.) who later gave him immunity to avoid being outed. There is no existing information to confirm these claims.

==== FBI Informant ====
Murphy was working as the Hilton hotel director when he was arrested for his involvement in the trafficking ring. He later served as an informant for the FBI until he came out as gay in the late 1970s.

== Later life ==
After he was indicted for his participation in the Chickens and the Bulls extortion ring, Murphy abated his life of crime and turned towards volunteering. He volunteered with the Sheridan unit and was the director for the One-to-One Foundation at the Manhattan Developmental Center.

He died of heart failure in 1989 in Manhattan, according to his lifelong friend. (Note: Other sources describe his death as being related to AIDS complications.) A few months after his death, he was named the Grand Marshal of the Gay and Lesbian Pride Parade.
