= Stacy Lentz =

American lesbian activist

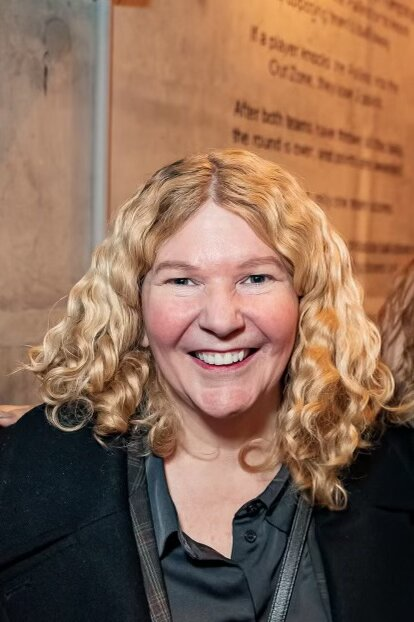
- Born: Stacy Marie Lentz; April 17, 1970 (age 56); United States
- Occupation: LGBTQ rights activist

Stacy Marie Lentz (born April 17, 1970) is an American lesbian LGBTQ rights activist, and a co-owner of the Stonewall Inn, and co-founder of the Stonewall Inn Gives Back Initiative. Stonewall Inn is the birthplace of the modern gay rights movements after the 1969 Stonewall riots and forms part of the Stonewall National Monument.

In 1994, Lentz moved from her home state of Kansas to New York, became a recruiter, and later joined a team of investors that saved and reopened the Stonewall Inn, a U.S National Historic Landmark.

In 2017, Stacy Lentz, Kurt Kelly, Bill Morgan, Tony DeCicco and Bob Kelly launched The Stonewall Inn Gives Back Initiative, which provides financial, educational, and strategic help to grassroots organizations that support members of the LGBTQ community.

In 2019 Lentz spearheaded the 50th anniversary of the Stonewall riots with the Launch of The Stonewall Gives Back Safe Spaces certification program. The program was kicked off by a Pride performance by Taylor Swift at the Stonewall Inn.

== Stonewall and activism ==
The Stonewall Inn, "widely considered to be the single most important event leading to the gay liberation movement and the modern fight for gay and lesbian rights in the United States", had fallen into disrepair in the early 2000s. Together with Kurt Kelly, Bill Morgan and Tony DeCicco, Lentz became a co-partner/investor in 2006 after saved the Inn from closure.

Lentz was the first lesbian investor in Stonewall's history. Lentz began using her position for activism by organizing or hosting events for GLAAD, Marriage Equality USA, the Hetrick-Martin Institute, HRC, the New York City Anti Violence Project (AVP), Sylvia's Place, Lambda Legal, and others. Lentz also helped organize the March for Marriage rally, uniting more than 80 LGBTQ organizations and thousands of people to call for the repeal of DOMA in 2013. Lentz planned Stonewall Inn's 40th anniversary celebration, which raised thousands of dollars to benefit the Hetrick Martin Institute home of the Harvey Milk High School in New York City.

Lentz has received notice for her activism. This has included honors from AVP and HBO, as well as a Community Heroes Award, after she helped organize a vigil and rally in response to a gay bashing at the Stonewall inn. She was awarded the Stonewall Community Foundation's Hero Award in 2010 for her activism and work in the LGBTQ community. Lentz was listed as one of GO Magazine's "100 Women We Love" in 2013. In addition, Lentz launched the Stonewall Inn Gives Back Initiative in 2017.

Lentz and GLAAD threatened to boycott Guinness, one of the major sponsors of New York City's St. Patrick's Day Parade, which would not allow LGBTQ people to march, if Guinness did not withdraw its sponsorship. The year after Guinness withdrew its sponsorship, LGBTQ groups were allowed in the parade.

Due to her activism and involvement at Stonewall and within the gay community at large, multiple outlets have quoted Lentz on her reaction to major LGBTQ and the overturning of DADT, Obama making history by mentioning Stonewall in his inaugural speech, and President Obama declaring Stonewall National monument in 2016.

As of 2023 Lentz lives in New York City and Co-owner of The Stonewall Inn along with business partners .
