= Scoring (industrial process) =

Cutting a groove in a rigid material

Scoring is a process in which one cuts a groove into rigid material. This groove is used to either break the material along the slit, for decoration, or act as a guideline for other processes such as painting.

== Etymology ==
From Middle English score, skore, schore, from Old English scoru (“notch; tally; score”), from Old Norse skor, from Proto-Germanic *skurō (“incision; tear; rift”), which is related to *skeraną (“to cut”), ultimately from Proto-Indo-European *(s)ker- (“cut”). Cognate with Icelandic skora, Swedish skåra, Danish skår. Related to shear.

== Advantages and disadvantages ==
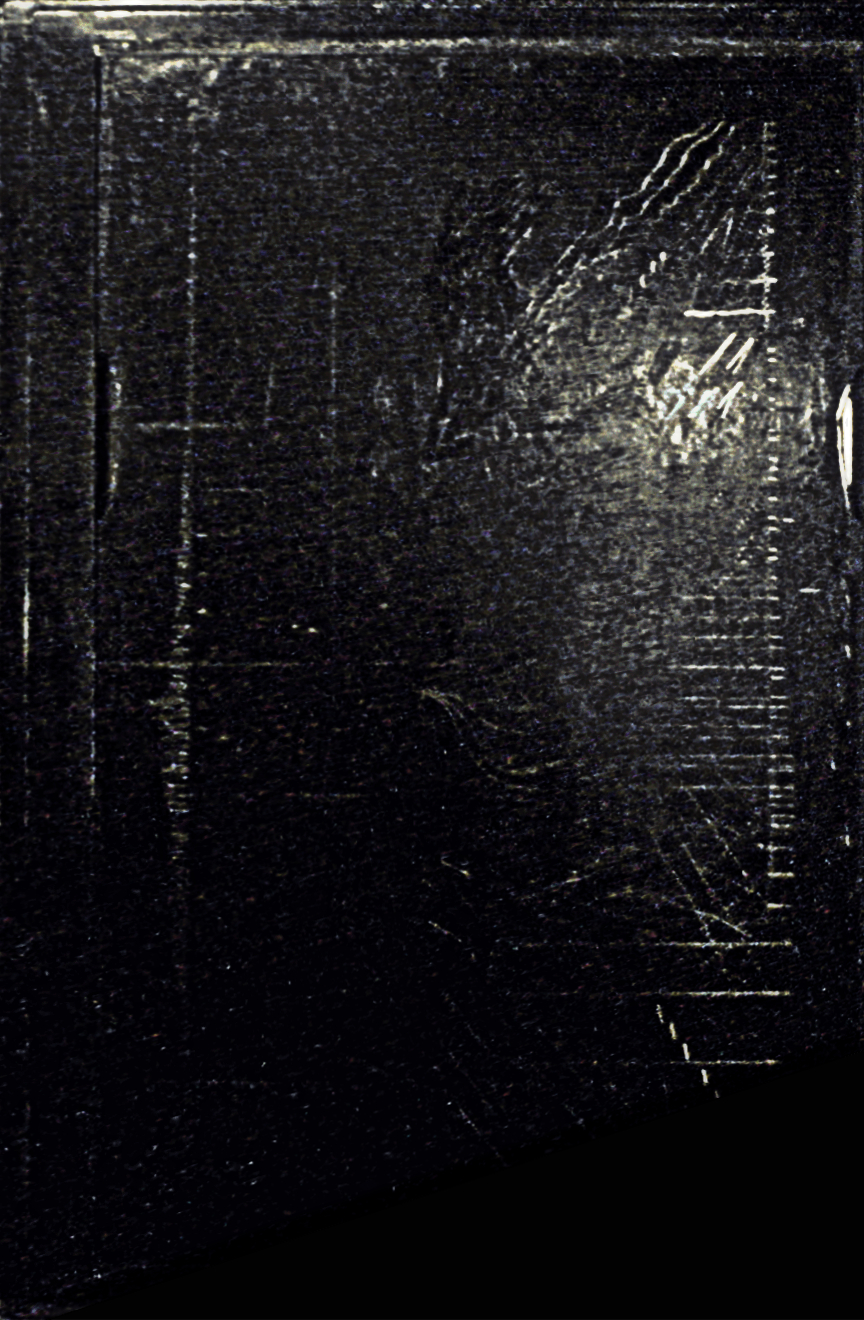
1. Groove; 2. Jagged edge from breakage

It can also be used to allow materials to expand and contract under varying thermal conditions. Scoring is used in place of cutting through the material all the way because you can obtain relatively the same results with less time and labor. However, when breaking along the score line the material may deviate from the set guideline, the back side of the break line often has a jagged edge to it from the shear fracture, and scoring offers very little use to metallic materials due to their malleability.

== Industries that use scoring ==
Due to their hardness, tile, stone, glass, and ceramics respond well to scoring, and so the practice finds use in tile setting, stoneworking, glassblowing, and ceramics work respectively.

Scoring is most commonly used in concrete work for decoration by making the grooves appear to be grout lines from tile work.

Confectioners often score hard candy such as butterscotch when batching it in sheets, in part because it avoids damaging the underlying baking tray.
