= Seventh-day Adventist Kinship International =

- Type: 501 (c)(3)
- Legal status: non-profit
- Purpose: LGBT supprort
- Services: Information, Advocacy, Support
- President: Floyd Poenitz
- Subsidiaries: The Intercollegiate Adventist GSA Coalition, Building Safe Places, We are Seventh-Day Adventist
- Website: http://www.sdakinship.org/

Seventh-day Adventist Kinship International is a support organization that provides a spiritual and social community to current and former Seventh-day Adventists who are lesbian, gay, bisexual, transgender, asexual and/or intersex (LGBTI), and have felt hurt or rejected because of their sexual orientation and/or gender identity. SDA Kinship offers them the compassion and support perceived to not be available within the organized Adventist Church.

== History and organization ==
Seventh-day Adventist Kinship, International, Inc. (Kinship) grew out of a 1976 meeting in Palm Desert, California, after some gay Adventist men placed an advertisement in The Advocate seeking other gay Adventists. Within four months there were 75 members and a rudimentary organization. During this time the name 'Kinship' was chosen because Seventh-day Adventists typically enjoy a close-knit family relationship with each other. Small groups of gay Adventists who had found each other in New York and San Francisco soon joined Kinship.

SDA Kinship is managed by a volunteer board and was incorporated as a non-profit organization in 1981. Current membership, including friends and family, is approximately 1,500 people in 62 countries. The SDA Kinship has no formal connection with the Seventh-day Adventist Church.

== Member services ==
Kinship exists to ease the initial distress of Seventh-day Adventists when they realize that they are gay, lesbian, bisexual, or transgender, and to facilitate the reconciling of their spirituality with their sexual orientation by offering suggested reading materials, personal dialogue, professional counseling referrals, and a network of supportive members.^{3}

=== Media services ===
Kinship enables communication among members by publishing a free quarterly magazine, Connection Magazine. With the advent of social media, Kinship has Facebook groups for "members only" as well as public groups. SDA Kinship can be found on most social media platforms at @sdakinship and on YouTube at @sdakinshipint. Official accounts are on Facebook, Twitter, Instagram as well as a Twitter account from the president: @KinshipPrez.

=== Kampmeeting ===
Since 1980, Kinship has organized an annual week-long conference called Kampmeeting where members can meet and renew friendships. Worship, lectures, music, group activities, and good food, including vegetarian fare, are all part of the program. Spiritual ministry is provided by supportive church leaders and gay former pastors. Communion service is conducted on Friday evening and is the only communion received by many members who have been alienated from the church. In recent years (as of 2008), similar gatherings have been held in Europe, Australia, and other parts of the world.

=== Regional services ===
In order to communicate with and serve its diverse membership, Kinship is organized by regions, with nine United States regions and eight overseas regions: Australia-New Zealand, Brazil, Canada, Central-South America, Europe, Germany, The Philippines, and the British Isles. Regional coordinators communicate with members, sometimes by newsletter, and often sponsor meetings for social, recreational, educational and worship purposes. The frequency and type of activities depend largely on the number and proximity of members living within each region.

=== Special interest group services ===
Seventh-day Adventist Kinship International has groups within Kinship called Family and Friends of Kinship, KinWomen, KinYouth.

== Actions taken to inform and sensitize the Adventist Church ==
=== Information packets ===
Kinship has mailed thousands of information packets to Adventist pastors, teachers and counselors and to every Adventist academy and college in North America. Information about HIV/AIDS has also been sent to every Adventist church in the United States.

=== Church leaders invited to Kampmeeting ===
In 1980 Kinship held its first national gathering called Kampmeeting (similar to a typical Adventist camp meeting). Three professors from the Adventist Theological Seminary and two pastors were invited to participate. They received permission from the General Conference, with the stipulation that SDA Kinship would not claim that this indicated the church's acceptance of homosexuality and that Colin Cook also be invited to present his ideas about helping homosexuals find healing. The invited theology professors, after the first in-depth research into what the Bible has to say about homosexuality, came to the conclusion that it was silent about persons with a homosexual orientation, and that its proscriptions against sexual exploitation, promiscuity, rape, and temple prostitution apply equally to heterosexuals and homosexuals. After hearing the traumatic stories of growing up gay in the Adventist church, the clergy were deeply moved and drew up a list of recommendations in their report to church leadership. However, protests from conservative members prompted church president Neal Wilson to instruct Adventist college, hospital, and church administrators to prevent anyone from meeting with Kampmeeting attendees the following year. Nevertheless, certain pastors and church leaders have continued to attend and speak at the annual Kampmeetings.

=== AIDS conference ===
In 1989 a pastor at Sligo Adventist Church in Takoma Park, Maryland, attended by many denominational headquarters personnel, conducted a support group for people with AIDS and their family members. The editor of the denominational magazine, Adventist Review, was a member of Sligo Church and together Sligo Church and the staff of Adventist Review sponsored a weekend AIDS Conference. They asked SDA Kinship to send three of its members who were ill with AIDS as delegates. A call was made at this conference for the church to address the AIDS epidemic through its hospital system. However, nothing of substance was accomplished until the extent of the epidemic among many heterosexual church members on the African continent became known.

=== Kinship Advisory Council ===
In 2000, a group of supportive church leaders was invited to form an advisory council to guide Kinship in bringing the Adventist Church to a more loving and redemptive attitude. This Council was instrumental in organizing a workshop on homosexuality and publishing a book resulting from the workshop.

=== Workshop on homosexuality ===
In January 2006, a workshop on homosexuality, held in Ontario, California, was jointly sponsored by SDA Kinship and the Association of Adventist Forums (now Adventist Forums), and was attended by about 60 invited observers. Twelve papers were presented on biological, sociological, psychological, legal, pastoral, theological, ethical, and Biblical aspects of homosexuality, and personal experiences.

=== Media activities ===
A book, My Son, Beloved Stranger, written by the wife of an Adventist minister about her family’s experience after learning their youngest son is gay, was published by Pacific Press in 1995. Another book, Christianity and Homosexuality: Some Seventh-day Adventist Perspectives, consisting of the papers presented at the 2006 Workshop on Homosexuality and six responses, was published by Adventist Forums in May 2008. Complimentary copies were mailed to 500 pastors, administrators, and thought leaders of the Adventist Church. In 2005 SDA Kinship produced a DVD, Open Heart, Open Hand. It records three conversations with leaders in the Adventist Church who are parents of gay and lesbian children. It is introduced by an Adventist theologian whose brother was a gay man. It was filmed by Dr. Harry and Janice Wang, who also have a gay family member. SDA kinship also produced Seventh-Gay Adventists, which started as a kickstarter project created by Daneen Akers and Stephen Eyer who also produced Enough Room at the Table.

=== Exhibits at church conferences ===
Beginning in 2000, at the quinquennial General Conference Session of the Seventh-day Adventist Church, "Someone to Talk to," an outreach to Adventist families and friends of gays and lesbians, has had an exhibit presence in at least one large church convention every year, with informational handouts and book and DVD sales. A growing interest has been noted over these years.

== Relations with Adventist Church ==
In the Seventh-day Adventist Church, homosexual relations are considered a violation and members engaging in such relations are subject to discipline.

=== Church sues Seventh-day Adventist Kinship, International over use of church name ===
The name "Seventh-day Adventist" (SDA), which the General Conference (GC) has been using since its official foundation in 1863, was trademarked toward the end of 1981. In 1987 a federal lawsuit was filed by the Adventist Church against Kinship in the U.S. District Court in Los Angeles, California, charging that by using "Seventh-day Adventist" in its name the gay support group was guilty of trademark infringement. It is not clear what events prompted the action, although as early as April 1981 (when the trademarking process was probably already under way) the North American Division committee had mentioned seeking counsel concerning what could be done to stop Kinship using the denominational name. Curiously, the lawsuit came ten years after the organization and seven years after the incorporation of Kinship, and after limited cooperative contacts between the church and Kinship. Leaders of Kinship surmised the reasons for this belated decision may have included anger over a recent Kinship demonstration at church headquarters. The lawsuit was decided in favor of SDA Kinship.

=== The Adventist church has sent a cease and desist over film name Seventh-Gay Adventist ===
"Your use and modification of the SEVENTH-DAY ADVENTIST mark in this manner is without permission of the GCCSDA and/or the church, and is likely to cause dilution by blurring the distinctive qualities of the SEVENTH-DAY ADVENTIST mark and by tarnishing the reputation of the mark. Your use of the mark in this manner is also likely to cause confusion among consumers who may mistakenly believe that the Church has authorized or approved your use of the SEVENTH-DAY ADVENTIST mark." However, there is no evidence that it went to court.

The name Seventh-day Adventist is generic and not protected by trademark law. The reason why the Seventh-Day Adventist is not protected by trademark law is because the adherents of the Seventh-Day Adventist Religion existed before the Seventh-day Adventist Church and in the film it is protected by the first amendment of the U.S Constitution

== Intercollegiate Adventist GSA Coalition ==
Intercollegiate Adventist GSA Coalition is a support organization for Adventist students who are LGBT+ it has been founded by Eliel Cruz current GSAs are AULL4ONE, PRISM, Gay and Straight People, SHIELD, Students For Equality, Q&A, and Beacon. it is supported by Seventh-Day Adventist Kinship International And by individual Seventh-Day Adventists who support LGBT rights the GSAs are currently on some Adventist campuses, Andrews University, La Sierra University, Pacific Union College, Southern Adventist University, Walla Walla University, Washington Adventist University, Union College. Intercollegiate Adventist GSA Coalition is not endorsed by the Seventh-Day Adventist Church nor any of their official ministries

- LGBT-welcoming church programs

== See also ==
Homosexuality and Seventh-day Adventism
