= LGBTQ culture in New York City =

LGBTQ culture in New York City

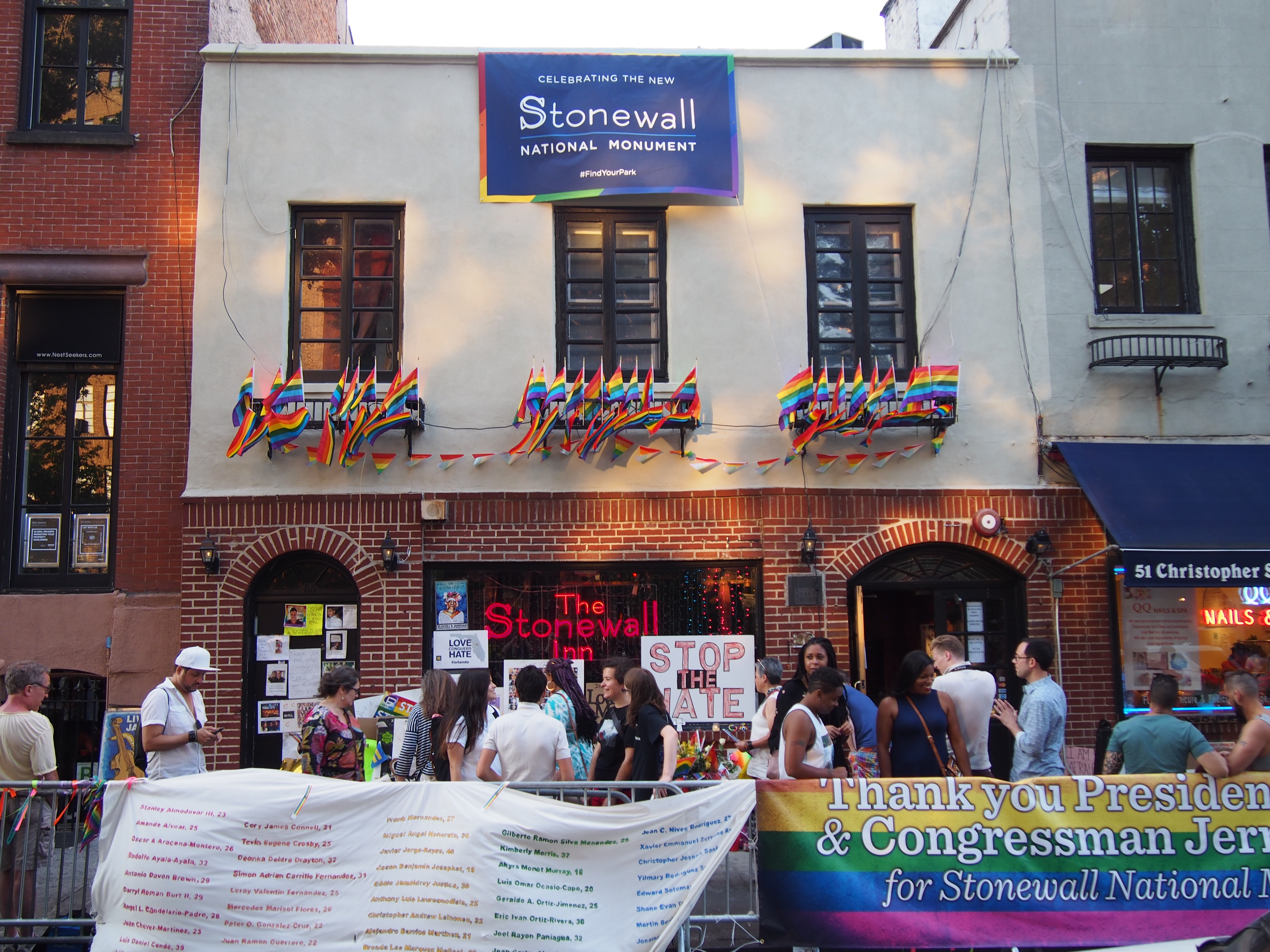
The Stonewall Inn in the gay village of Greenwich Village, Manhattan, the cradle of the modern gay rights movement.

New York City has been described as the gay capital of the world and the central node of the LGBTQ sociopolitical field, and is home to the world's largest and the most prominent LGBTQ population. Brian Silverman, the author of Frommer's New York City from $90 a Day, wrote the city has "one of the world's largest, loudest, and most powerful LGBT communities", and "Gay and lesbian culture is as much a part of New York's basic identity as yellow cabs, high-rise buildings, and Broadway theatre". LGBTQ travel guide Queer in the World states, "The fabulosity of Gay New York is unrivaled on Earth, and queer culture seeps into every corner of its five boroughs". LGBTQ advocate and entertainer Madonna stated metaphorically, "Anyways, not only is New York City the best place in the world because of the queer people here. Let me tell you something, if you can make it here, then you must be queer."

LGBTQ Americans in New York City constitute the largest self-identifying lesbian, gay, bisexual, transgender, and queer communities by a significant margin in the United States, and the 1969 Stonewall riots in Greenwich Village are widely considered to be the genesis of the modern LGBTQ rights movement. The New York metropolitan area has an estimated 756,000 LGBTQ residents—the most in the United States, including the largest metropolitan transgender population in the world, estimated at 50,000 in 2018, concentrated in Manhattan, Brooklyn, and Queens.

== History as gay metropolis ==
Charles Kaiser, author of The Gay Metropolis: The Landmark History of Gay Life in America, wrote that in the era after World War II, "New York City became the literal gay metropolis for hundreds of thousands of immigrants from both within and without the United States: the place they chose to learn how to live openly, honestly and without shame." Comedian Jerrod Carmichael joked, "That's actually why I live here...if you say you're gay in New York, you can ride the bus for free and they just give you free pizza. if you say you're gay in New York, you get to host Saturday Night Live. This is the gayest thing you can possibly do. We're basically in an Andy Warhol fever dream right now."

=== Stonewall Inn ===
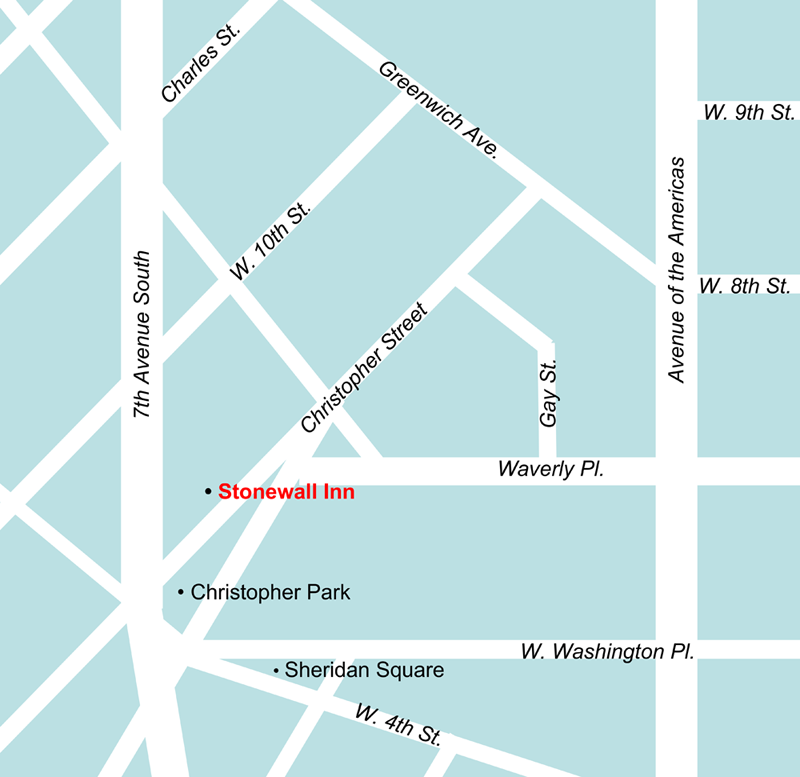
The location of the Stonewall Inn in Greenwich Village

The Stonewall Inn, located at 51 and 53 Christopher Street, along with several other establishments in the city, was owned by the Genovese crime family. In 1966, three members of the Mafia invested $3,500 to turn the Stonewall Inn into a gay bar, after it had been a restaurant and a nightclub geared toward heterosexuals. Once a week a police officer would collect envelopes of cash as a payoff; the Stonewall Inn had no liquor license. It had no running water behind the bar—used glasses were run through tubs of water and immediately reused. There were no fire exits, and the toilets overran consistently. Though the bar was not used for prostitution, drug sales and other "cash transactions" took place. It was the only bar for gay men in New York City where dancing was allowed; dancing was its main draw since its re-opening as a gay club.

Visitors to the Stonewall Inn in 1969 were greeted by a bouncer who inspected them through a peephole in the door. The legal drinking age was 18, and to avoid unwittingly letting in undercover police (who were called "Lily Law", "Alice Blue Gown", or "Betty Badge"), visitors would have to be known by the doorman, or look gay. The entrance fee on weekends was $3, for which the customer received two tickets that could be exchanged for two drinks. Patrons were required to sign their names in a book to prove that the bar was a private "bottle club", but rarely signed their real names. There were two dance floors in the Stonewall; the interior was painted black, making it very dark inside, with pulsing gel lights or black lights. If police were spotted, regular white lights were turned on, signaling that everyone should stop dancing or touching.

In the rear of the bar was a smaller room frequented by "queens"; it was one of two bars where effeminate men who wore makeup and teased their hair (though dressed in men's clothing) could go. Only a few transvestites, or men in full drag, were allowed in by the bouncers. The customers were "98 percent male" but a few lesbians sometimes came to the bar. Younger homeless adolescent males, who slept in nearby Christopher Park, would often try to get in so customers would buy them drinks. The age of the clientele ranged between the upper teens and early thirties, and the racial mix was evenly distributed among white, Black, and Hispanic patrons. Because of its even mix of people, its location, and the attraction of dancing, the Stonewall Inn was known by many as "the gay bar in the city".

Police raids on gay bars were frequent, occurring on average once a month for each bar. Many bars kept extra liquor in a secret panel behind the bar, or in a car down the block, to facilitate resuming business as quickly as possible if alcohol was seized. Bar management usually knew about raids beforehand due to police tip-offs, and raids occurred early enough in the evening that business could commence after the police had finished.

During a typical raid, the lights were turned on, and customers were lined up and their identification cards checked. Those without identification or dressed in full drag were arrested; others were allowed to leave. Some of the men, including those in drag, used their draft cards as identification. Women were required to wear three pieces of feminine clothing, and would be arrested if found not wearing them. Employees and management of the bars were also typically arrested. The period immediately before June 28, 1969, was marked by frequent raids of local bars—including a raid at the Stonewall Inn on the Tuesday before the riots—and the closing of the Checkerboard, the Tele-Star, and two other clubs in Greenwich Village.

On June 23, 2015, the Stonewall Inn was the first landmark in New York City to be recognized by the New York City Landmarks Preservation Commission on the basis of its status in LGBT history, and on June 24, 2016, the Stonewall National Monument was named the first U.S. National Monument dedicated to the LGBTQ-rights movement. The visitor center opened on June 28, 2024, as the first official national visitors center dedicated to the LGBTQ+ experience to open anywhere in the world. Numerous politicians and celebrities participated in the inauguration ceremonies, and the New York City Subway's Christopher Street–Sheridan Square station was renamed the Christopher Street–Stonewall station on the same day.

=== Stonewall riots ===
==== Police raid ====
The layout of the Stonewall Inn, 1969

At 1:20 a.m. on Saturday, June 28, 1969, four plainclothes policemen in dark suits, two patrol officers in uniform, and Detective Charles Smythe and Deputy Inspector Seymour Pine arrived at the Stonewall Inn's double doors and announced "Police! We're taking the place!" Stonewall employees do not recall being tipped off that a raid was to occur that night, as was the custom. According to Duberman (p. 194), there was a rumor that one might happen, but since it was much later than raids generally took place, Stonewall management thought the tip was inaccurate. Days after the raid, one of the bar owners complained that the tipoff had never come, and that the raid was ordered by the Bureau of Alcohol, Tobacco, and Firearms, who objected that there were no stamps on the liquor bottles, indicating the alcohol was bootlegged.

Historian David Carter presents information indicating that the Mafia owners of the Stonewall and the manager were blackmailing wealthier customers, particularly those who worked in Lower Manhattan's Financial District. They appeared to be making more money from extortion than they were from liquor sales in the bar. Carter deduces that when the police were unable to receive kickbacks from blackmail and the theft of negotiable bonds (facilitated by pressuring gay Wall Street customers), they decided to close the Stonewall Inn permanently.

Two undercover policewomen and two undercover policemen had entered the bar earlier that evening to gather visual evidence, as the Public Morals Squad waited outside for the signal. Once inside, they called for backup from the Sixth Precinct using the bar's pay telephone. The music was turned off and the main lights were turned on. Approximately 205 people were in the bar that night. Patrons who had never experienced a police raid were confused. A few who realized what was happening began to run for doors and windows in the bathrooms, but police barred the doors. As Michael Fader remembered,

Things happened so fast you kind of got caught not knowing. All of a sudden there were police there and we were told to all get in lines and to have our identification ready to be led out of the bar.

The raid did not go as planned. Standard procedure was to line up the patrons, check their identification, and have female police officers take customers dressed as women to the bathroom to verify their gender, upon which any men dressed as women would be arrested. Those dressed as women that night refused to go with the officers. Men in line began to refuse to produce their identification. The police decided to take everyone present to the police station, after separating those cross-dressing in a room in the back of the bar. Maria Ritter, then known as Steve to her family, recalled, "My biggest fear was that I would get arrested. My second biggest fear was that my picture would be in a newspaper or on a television report in my mother's dress!" Both patrons and police recalled that a sense of discomfort spread very quickly, spurred by police who began to assault some of the lesbians by "feeling some of them up inappropriately" while frisking them.

=== Transgender contribution ===
Despite playing a significant role in fighting for LGBTQ equality during the period of the Stonewall Riots and thereafter, the transgender community in New York City had previously felt marginalized and neglected by the gay community. Since then, and especially during the 21st century, New York City's transgender community has grown in size and prominence, reaching an estimated 50,000 in 2018. Brooklyn Liberation March, the largest transgender rights demonstration in LGBTQ history, took place on June 14, 2020, stretching from Grand Army Plaza to Fort Greene, Brooklyn, focused on supporting Black transgender lives.

==== Removal of transgender and queer references from NPS website ====
Originally, the U.S. National Park Service (NPS) website for the Stonewall National Monument discussed the transgender and queer communities. After U.S. president Donald Trump signed Executive Order 14168 in 2025, mandating that the federal government and federally funded entities cease any promotion of "gender ideology", all references to transgender and queer people were removed from the website. The news was first reported on February 13, 2025. The Stonewall Inn Gives Back Initiative and The Stonewall Inn issued a joint statement the same day, saying:

"This blatant act of erasure not only distorts the truth of our history, but it also dishonors the immense contributions of transgender individuals — especially transgender women of color — who were at the forefront of the Stonewall Riots and the broader fight for LGBTQ+ rights."

They went on to spotlight Marsha P. Johnson, Sylvia Rivera, and "countless other trans and gender-nonconforming individuals" as "central to the resistance we now celebrate as the foundation of the modern LGBTQ+ rights movement." A resistance movement has begun to revert the erasure of trans and queer history from the Stonewall Monument National website, although New York State's own official LGBTQ monument on the Hudson River shoreline has deliberately preserved all trans and queer references.

=== State of New York official LGBTQ monument ===
On June 25, 2017, the day of 2017 New York City Pride March festivities, New York Governor Andrew Cuomo announced that the artist Anthony Goicolea had been chosen to design the first official monument to LGBTQ individuals commissioned by the State of New York – in contrast to the Stonewall National Monument, which was commissioned by the U.S. federal government. The State monument is planned to be built in Hudson River Park in Manhattan, near the waterfront Hudson River piers which have served as historically significant symbols of New York's role as a meeting place and a safe haven for LGBT communities. On June 20, 2023, the intersection of Fifth Avenue and Washington Square North in the West Village was officially renamed Edie Windsor and Thea Speyer Way at the state level by New York Governor Kathy Hochul, in honor of the Greenwich Village plaintiffs who prevailed at the United States Supreme Court in 2013, in finding the Defense of Marriage Act, which had limited the definition of marriage as being valid strictly between one man and one woman, to be unconstitutional.

=== National LGBTQ Wall of Honor ===
On June 27, 2019, the National LGBTQ Wall of Honor was inaugurated at the Stonewall Inn. The landmark is an American memorial wall in Lower Manhattan dedicated to LGBTQ "pioneers, trailblazers, and heroes". The wall is located inside of the Stonewall Inn, and is a part of the Stonewall National Monument, the first U.S. National Monument dedicated to LGBTQ rights and history. The first fifty nominees were announced in June 2019 and the wall was unveiled on June 27, 2019, as a part of the Stonewall 50 – WorldPride NYC 2019 events. Each year five additional names will be added.

=== Mpox public health emergency ===
In 2022, the LGBT community in New York City became the epicenter of the mpox outbreak in the Western Hemisphere. New York Governor Kathy Hochul and New York City Mayor Eric Adams declared corresponding public health emergencies in the state and city, respectively, in July 2022.

== Demographics and economy ==
=== Population and concentration ===
New York City has been estimated to have become home to over 270,000 self-identifying gay and bisexual individuals, higher than San Francisco and Los Angeles combined.

Geographic entity	GLB population	Density of GLB individuals per square mile	Percentage of GLB individuals in population
New York City	272,493	894	4.5 (2005)
New York metropolitan area	568,903	84.7	4.0

=== Economic clout ===
Lonely Planet New York City stated that of the demographics, the city's LGBT population has "one of the largest disposable incomes", encompassing professionals including physicians, attorneys, engineers, scientists, financiers, and journalists, as well as those in the entertainment industry, fashion design, and realty. Conversely, New York City is also a highly popular LGBT tourist destination, and the city actively courts LGBTQ tourism.

== Gay villages ==
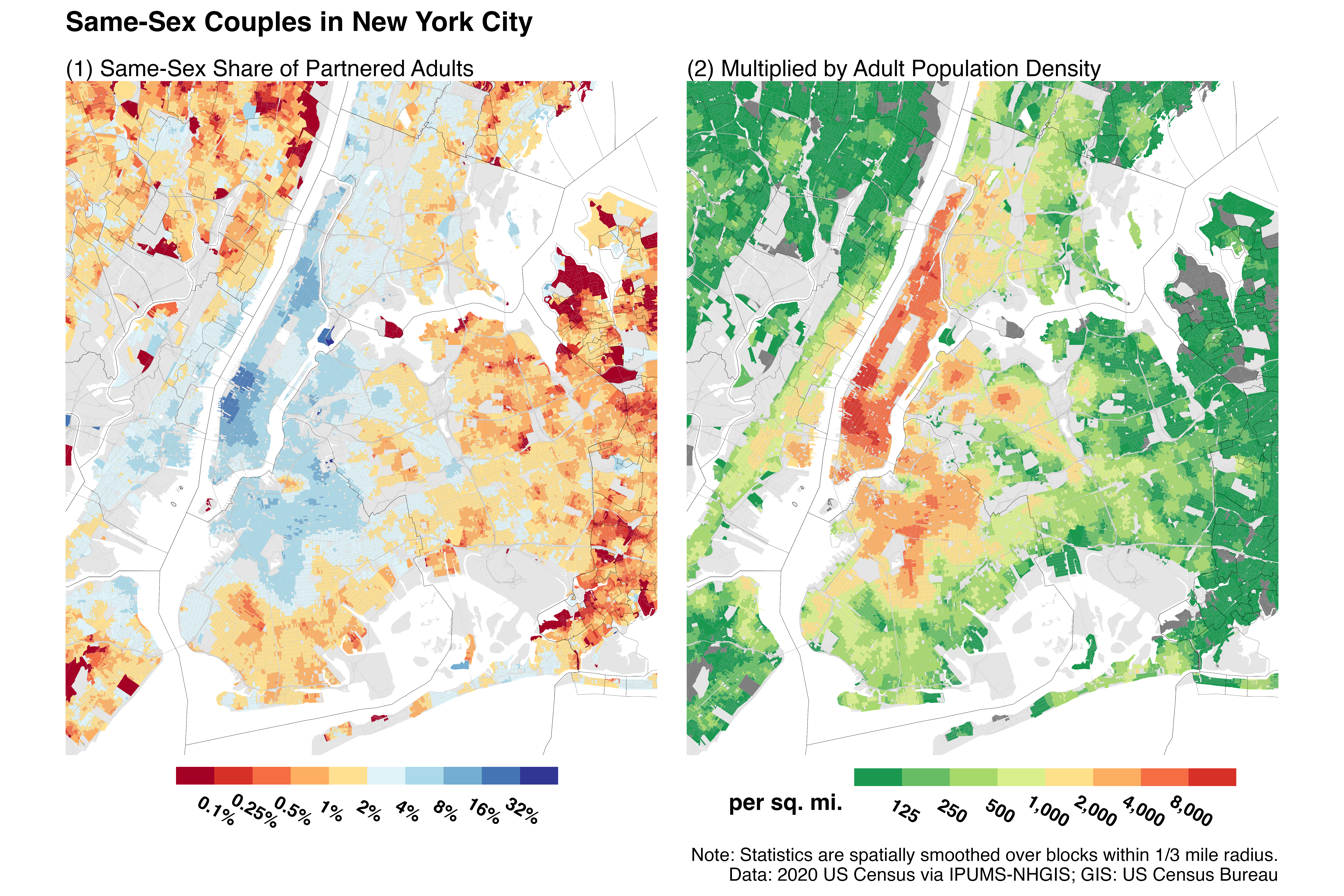
Map of same-sex couples in New York City

=== Manhattan ===
Manhattan is the epicenter of LGBTQ culture. The area around Christopher Street in the West Village of Manhattan was the historical hub of gay life in New York City and continues to be a cultural center for the LGBT experience. Chelsea in Manhattan is another focal point of gay social life, and the East Village/Lower East Side area of Manhattan is also a gayborhood. Hell's Kitchen and Morningside Heights are additional Manhattan neighborhoods which have developed a significant LGBT presence of their own.

==== Greenwich Village ====
Attracting over 2 million spectators, the annual NYC Halloween Parade in Greenwich Village, Manhattan, is the world's largest nighttime parade and Halloween celebration, with its roots in New York's gay culture.

The Manhattan neighborhoods of Greenwich Village and Harlem were home to a sizable homosexual population after World War I, when men and women who had served in the military took advantage of the opportunity to settle in larger cities. The enclaves of gays and lesbians, described by a newspaper story as "short-haired women and long-haired men", developed a distinct subculture through the following two decades.

Prohibition inadvertently benefited gay establishments, as drinking alcohol was pushed underground along with other behaviors considered immoral. New York City passed laws against homosexuality in public and private businesses, but because alcohol was in high demand, speakeasies and impromptu drinking establishments were so numerous and temporary that authorities were unable to police them all. However, police raids happened, resulting in their closure, such as the Eve's Hangout at 129 MacDougal Street, after the deportation of Eva Kotchever for obscenity.

The social repression of the 1950s resulted in a cultural revolution in Greenwich Village. A cohort of poets, later named the Beat poets, wrote about the evils of the social organization at the time, glorifying anarchy, drugs, and hedonistic pleasures over unquestioning social compliance, consumerism, and closed mindedness. Of them, Allen Ginsberg and William S. Burroughs—both Greenwich Village residents—also wrote bluntly and honestly about homosexuality. Their writings attracted sympathetic liberal-minded people, as well as homosexuals looking for a community.

By the early 1960s, a campaign to rid New York City of gay bars was in full effect by order of Mayor Robert F. Wagner, Jr., who was concerned about the image of the city in preparation for the 1964 World's Fair. The city revoked the liquor licenses of the bars, and undercover police officers worked to entrap as many homosexual men as possible. Entrapment usually consisted of an undercover officer who found a man in a bar or public park, engaged him in conversation; if the conversation headed toward the possibility that they might leave together—or the officer bought the man a drink—he was arrested for solicitation. One story in the New York Post described an arrest in a gym locker room, where the officer grabbed his crotch, moaning, and a man who asked him if he was all right was arrested. Few lawyers would defend cases as undesirable as these, and some of those lawyers kicked back their fees to the arresting officer. The annual New York Halloween Parade in Greenwich Village is the world's largest Halloween parade, and has its roots in New York's queer community, standing in as an expression of LGBT pride, before the formal NYC Pride March was born.

The Mattachine Society succeeded in getting newly elected Mayor John Lindsay to end the campaign of police entrapment in New York City. They had a more difficult time with the New York State Liquor Authority (SLA). While no laws prohibited serving homosexuals, courts allowed the SLA discretion in approving and revoking liquor licenses for businesses that might become "disorderly". Despite the high population of gays and lesbians who called Greenwich Village home, very few places existed, other than bars, where they were able to congregate openly without being harassed or arrested. In 1966, the New York Mattachine Society held a "sip-in" at a Greenwich Village bar named Julius, which was frequented by gay men, to illustrate the discrimination homosexuals faced.

None of the bars frequented by gays and lesbians were owned by gay people in the 1960s. Almost all of them were owned and controlled by organized crime, who treated the regulars poorly, watered down the liquor, and overcharged for drinks. However, they also paid off police to prevent frequent raids.

The annual New York's Village Halloween Parade began in 1974, with its roots in New York's queer culture; it is the world's largest Halloween parade and America's only major nighttime parade, taking place in Greenwich Village. The parade attracts over two million spectators, many tens of thousands of costumed participants, and a worldwide television audience.

Greenwich Village contained the world's oldest gay and lesbian bookstore, Oscar Wilde Bookshop, founded in 1967 but permanently closed in 2009 citing the recession and the rise of online booksellers. The Lesbian, Gay, Bisexual & Transgender Community Center – best known as simply "The Center" – has occupied the former Food & Maritime Trades High School at 208 West 13th Street since 1984. In 2006, the Village was the scene of an assault involving seven lesbians and a straight man that sparked appreciable media attention, with strong statements both defending and attacking the parties. In June 2015, thousands gathered in front of the Stonewall Inn to celebrate the ruling by the U.S. Supreme Court affirming same-sex marriage in all fifty U.S. states, while in June 2016, thousands gathered similarly in vigil for the Orlando Pulse Nightclub massacre.

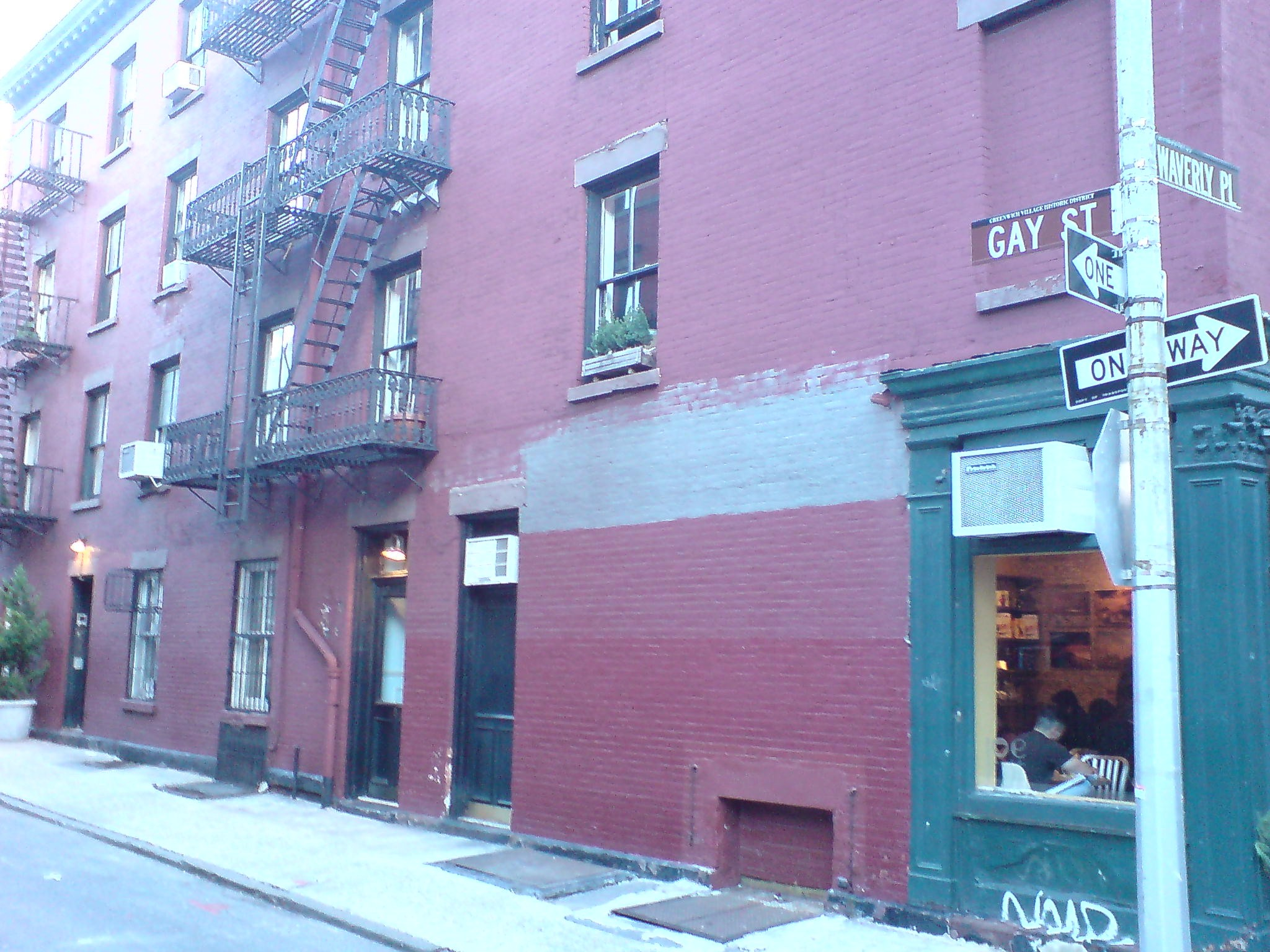
Gay Street, at the corner of Waverly Place, in Greenwich Village

In February 2017, thousands protested at the Stonewall National Monument against the proposed policies of the administration of U.S. president Donald Trump affecting both LGBTQ individuals and international immigrants, including those holding the intersection of these identities. In June 2019, the New York City Commission on Human Rights partnered with MasterCard International to commemorate the Stonewall 50 - WorldPride NYC 2019 milestone by planting a new street sign pan-inclusive for sexual orientations and gender identities at the intersection of Gay Street and Christopher Street in the West Village, and renaming that portion of Gay Street as Acceptance Street.

==== Chelsea ====
Chelsea in Manhattan is one of the most gay-friendly neighborhoods in New York City. In the 1990s, many gay people moved to the Chelsea neighborhood from the Greenwich Village neighborhood as a less expensive alternative; subsequent to this movement, house prices in Chelsea have increased dramatically to rival the West Village area of Greenwich Village. While New York was a latecomer to the leather and kink fetish movement, this subculture is now burgeoning in the city, originating in Chelsea and eventually expanding to Brooklyn and Queens.

==== Hell's Kitchen ====
The same phenomenon of gentrification in Greenwich Village which created a gayborhood in Chelsea, has in turn spawned a new gayborhood in the Hell's Kitchen neighborhood on the West Side of Midtown Manhattan, just uptown, or north, of Chelsea, as gentrification has taken hold in Chelsea itself. The Metropolitan Community Church of New York, geared toward the LGBT community, is located in Hell's Kitchen.

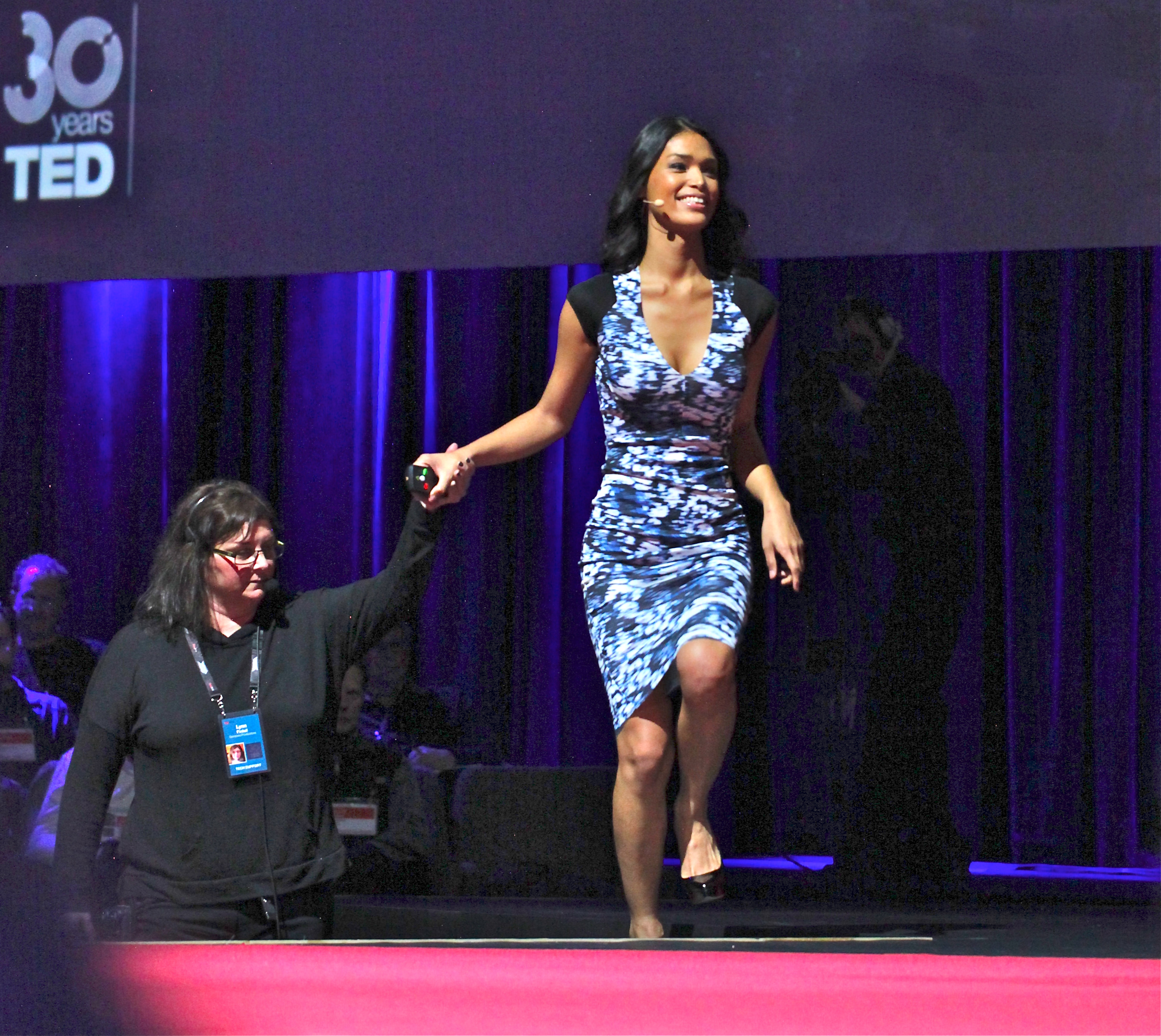
Manila–born supermodel Geena Rocero takes the stage at a TED conference in Manhattan to come out as transgender on International Transgender Day of Visibility, March 31, 2014. New York City is home to the world's largest transgender population, estimated at 50,000 in 2018.

=== Brooklyn ===
Brooklyn is home to a large and growing number of same-sex couples. Same-sex marriages in New York were legalized on June 24, 2011, and were authorized to take place beginning 30 days thereafter. The Park Slope neighborhood spearheaded the popularity of Brooklyn among lesbians, and Prospect Heights has an LGBT residential presence. Numerous neighborhoods have since become home to LGBT communities.

=== Queens ===
Adjacent Elmhurst and Jackson Heights, Queens, are focal hubs for the transgender community of New York City and collectively constitute the largest transgender hub in the world. The Queens Pride Parade is held in Jackson Heights each year. Astoria has an emerging LGBT presence. Queens is also becoming a destination for LGBT individuals priced out of still more expensive housing in Brooklyn.

=== Elsewhere in the New York metropolitan area ===
As the LGBTQ communities have achieved higher socioeconomic status and greater political clout over the decades, it has moved beyond the boundaries of New York City and spread out across the New York metropolitan area. Westchester County in particular has spawned several gay villages concomitantly with hipster villages, notably in Hastings-on-Hudson, Dobbs Ferry, Irvington, and Tarrytown. The neighboring Fire Island communities of Cherry Grove and Fire Island Pines constitute the largest gay enclave on Long Island, followed by The Hamptons.

Gayborhoods have also emerged across the Hudson River from Manhattan in the U.S. state of New Jersey, which is now home to more gay villages per square mile than any other state. Some of the most prominent gayborhoods in New Jersey include Jersey City, Asbury Park, Maplewood, Montclair, and Lambertville. Trenton, the state capital of New Jersey, elected Reed Gusciora, its first openly gay mayor, in 2018, and Jennifer Williams, New Jersey's first openly transgender city councilmember, in 2022.

In June 2018, suburban Maplewood, New Jersey, unveiled permanent rainbow-colored crosswalks to celebrate LGBTQ pride, a feature displayed by only a few other towns in the world, including Rahway, New Jersey, which unveiled its own rainbow-colored crosswalks in June 2019. In January 2019, New Jersey Governor Phil Murphy signed legislation mandating LGBTQ-inclusive educational curriculum in schools. In February 2019, New Jersey began allowing a neutral or non-binary gender choice on birth certificates, while New York City already had this provision.

The following constitutes an incomplete list of gay villages in the New York metropolitan area as of 2023:

New Jersey
Asbury Park	Monmouth County
Ewing	Mercer County
Jersey City	Hudson County
Lambertville	Hunterdon County
Maplewood	Essex County
Mill Hill (Trenton)	Mercer County
Ocean Grove	Monmouth County
Plainfield	Union County
South Orange	Essex County
New York
Chelsea	New York City (Manhattan)
Christopher Street, West Village/Greenwich Village	New York City (Manhattan)
Hell's Kitchen	New York City (Manhattan)
Inwood	New York City (Manhattan)
Washington Heights	New York City (Manhattan)
Park Slope	New York City (Brooklyn)
Jackson Heights	New York City (Queens)
Cherry Grove	Suffolk County
Fire Island Pines	Suffolk County
The Hamptons	Suffolk County

== Politics ==
Politics in New York City are mainly liberal. Rosenberg and Dunford stated that this political standpoint had historically been "generally beneficial to the gay community".

In New York City, New York City Republican Party political administrations actively court LGBT voters. LGBT voters were 3.4% of New York City's electorate in 1989.

In the mid-1970s, LGBT participation in New York City politics began. In the 1977 Mayor of New York City elections, Edward Koch was the preferred candidate; there had been speculation that Koch was homosexual. However, Koch associated with religious figures opposed to homosexuality and did not pass LGBT civil rights bills, and therefore in 1981, Frank Barbaro became the candidate favored by the LGBT political groups.

In the 1985 mayoral election, Koch had almost no support; Donald P. Haider-Markel, the author of Gay and Lesbian Americans and Political Participation: A Reference Handbook, wrote that Koch's "actions on AIDS seemed inadequate at best". In the 1989 mayoral election, David Dinkins received support from the LGBT community. Since then, every mayor has received support from the LGBT community, which included Rudy Giuliani and Mike Bloomberg.

Jimmy Van Bramer, the Majority Leader of the New York City Council in 2017, is an openly gay politician from Queens who has served in the City Council for over six years. Van Bramer was one of seven openly LGBT members of the New York City Council as of 2017, alongside Rosie Mendez, Corey Johnson, Ritchie Torres, James Vacca, Daniel Dromm and Carlos Menchaca. Christine Quinn served as Speaker of the New York City Council between 2006 and 2013. Carlos Menchaca also became the first Mexican-American member of the New York City Council when elected in November 2013.

In June 2019, in celebration of LGBT Pride Month, Governor Andrew Cuomo ordered the LGBT pride flag to be raised over the New York State Capitol for the first time in New York State history.

In April 2022, New York City Mayor Eric Adams announced a billboard campaign to attract Floridians to New York City in response to Florida's "Don't Say Gay" law.

== Institutions ==
New York City's Comptroller has published a citywide LGBTQIA+ Guide of Services and Resources annually for over a decade.

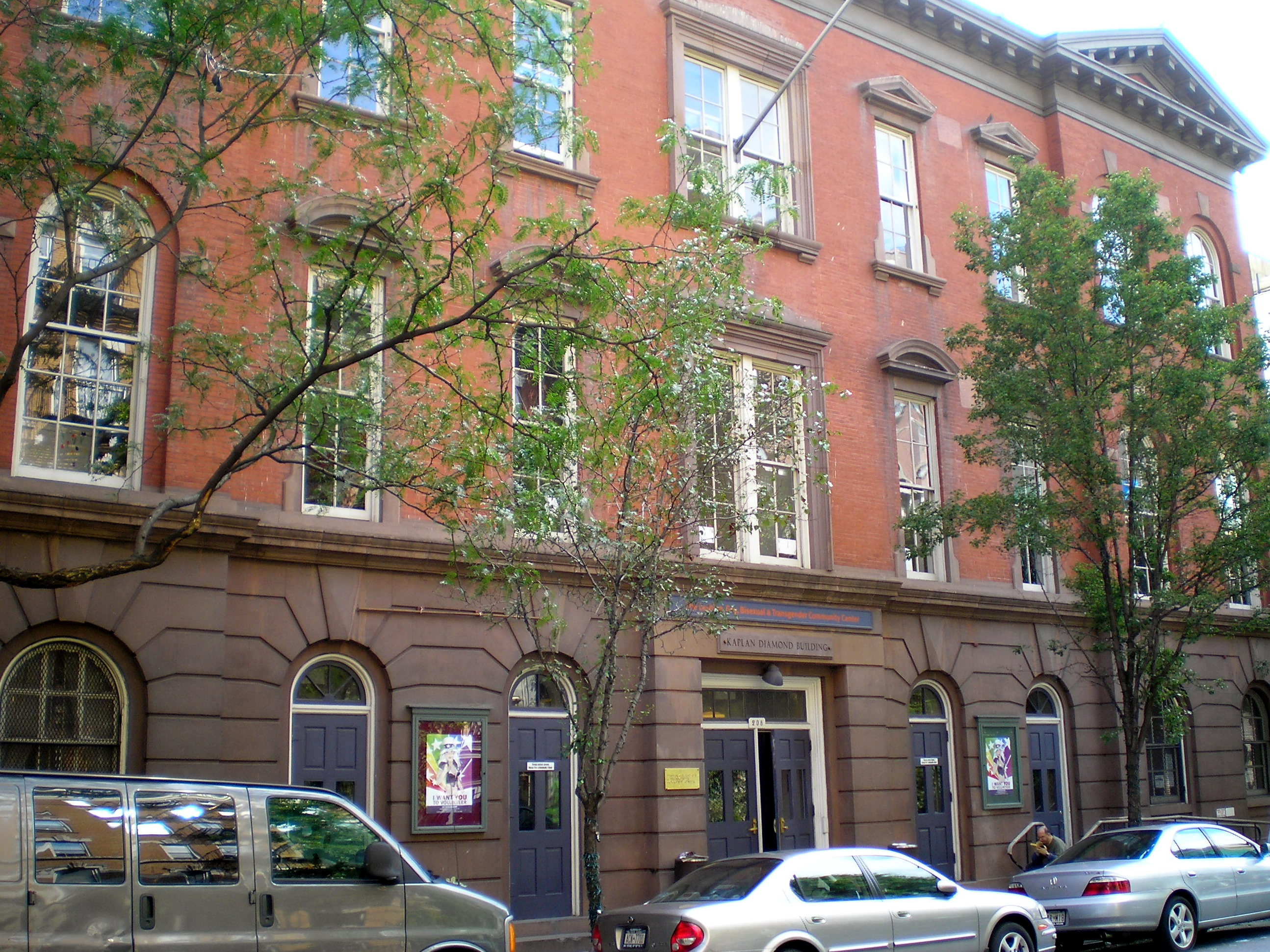
The Lesbian, Gay, Bisexual & Transgender Community Center

The Lesbian, Gay, Bisexual & Transgender Community Center is located on West 13th Street in the West Village, Lower Manhattan.

Services & Advocacy for GLBT Elders (SAGE) is the country's largest and oldest organization dedicated to improving the lives of lesbian, gay, bisexual and transgender people. SAGE is located at 305 Seventh Avenue, 15th Floor NYC, NY 10001. SAGE has expanded throughout New York City, with additional centers now located in Harlem, the Bronx, Brooklyn, and Staten Island.

The Bronx Academy of Arts and Dance is a New York performing and visual art workshop space and performance venue located in The Bronx. Co-founded in 1998 by Arthur Aviles, dancer and choreographer who performed with the Bill T. Jones/Arnie Zane Dance Company, and Charles Rice-Gonzales, a writer, LGBT activist, and publicist. Focusing on works exploring the margins of Latino and LGBTQ cultures. The programs at BAAD! are made up of dancers, LGBTQ visual artists, women, and artists of color.

The Bureau of General Services – Queer Division (BGSQD) is a queer cultural center, bookstore, and event space hosted by The Lesbian, Gay, Bisexual & Transgender Community Center in New York City.

The Queer Big Apple Corps is a community symphonic and marching band. In 2020, they became the first LGBTQ+ band to perform in the Macy's Thanksgiving Day Parade.

Bluestockings was a cooperatively-owned queer bookstore, community space, and café operating on the Lower East Side from 1999 to 2025.

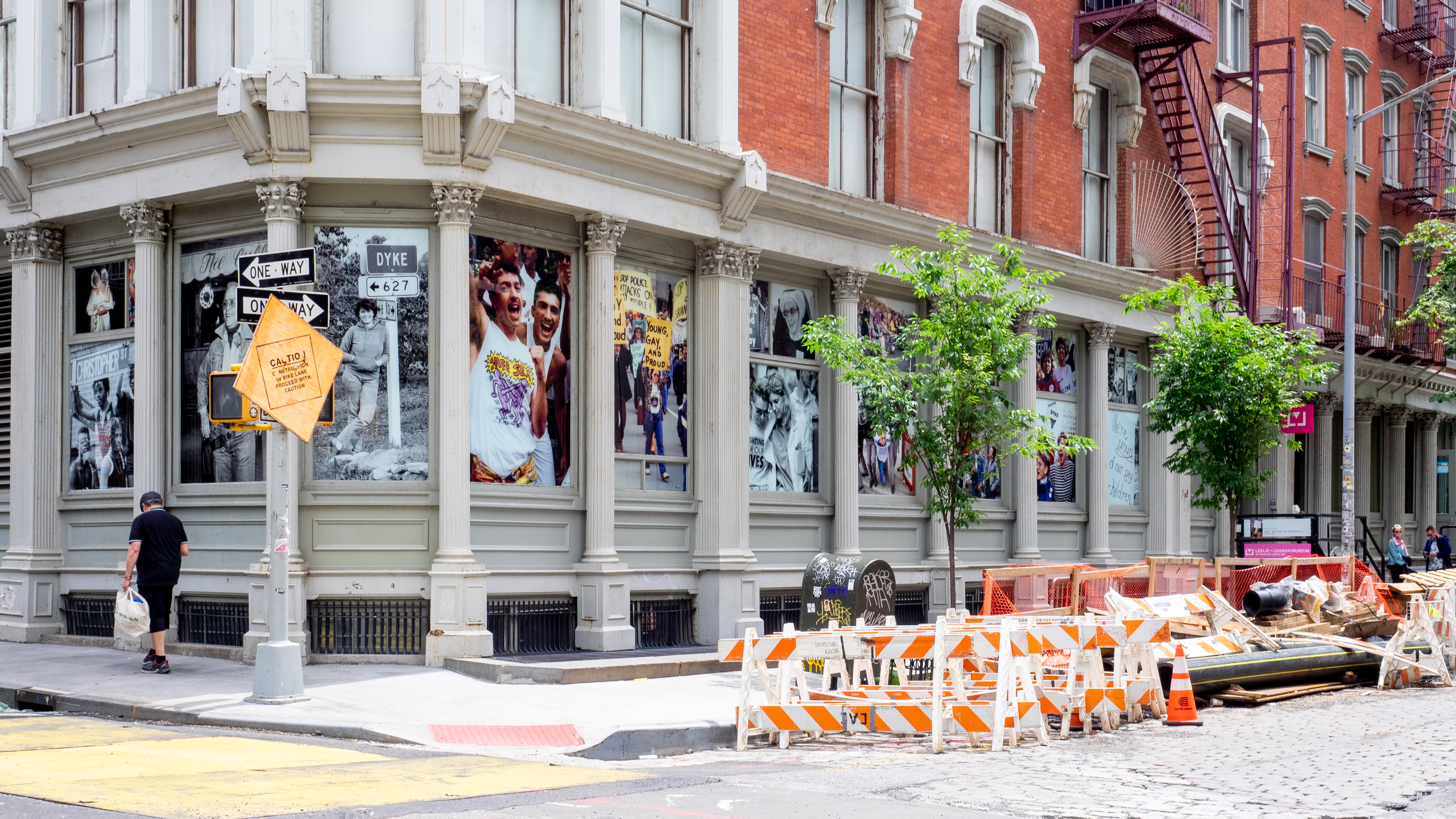
The Leslie-Lohman Museum of Art in SoHo, Lower Manhattan, is the only museum in the world dedicated to artwork portraying the LGBTQ experience.

The Leslie-Lohman Museum of Art (LLM) is located in Soho, Lower Manhattan, and is the only museum in the world dedicated to artwork documenting the LGBTQ+ experience.

Lambda Legal and GMHC are headquartered in New York City.

The Lesbian Herstory Archives is located in a townhouse in Brooklyn. It has 12,000 photographs, over 11,000 books, 1,300 periodical titles, and 600 videos. There are also thousands of miscellaneous items.

The Bronx Community Pride Center was previously located in the Bronx. The city government had funded the nonprofit agency. Lisa Winters, who headed the agency from 2004 until 2010, had stolen $143,000 from the agency; she was ultimately fired. She was convicted of stealing the funds and misusing a credit card belonging to another person. In April 2013 she received a prison sentence of two concurrent terms, each two to six years. Winters' theft resulted in the closure of the agency.

The New York City Subway system commemorates Pride Month in June with Pride-themed posters and celebrated Stonewall 50 - WorldPride NYC 2019 in June 2019 with rainbow-themed Pride logos on the subway trains as well as Pride-themed MetroCards.

== NYC LGBTQ Historic Sites Project ==
The NYC LGBTQ Historic Sites Project maps New York City's LGBTQ history, neighborhood by neighborhood; placing the city's LGBTQ history in a geographical context. Its interactive map features neighborhood sites important to NYC LGBTQ history in fields such as the arts, literature, and social justice, in addition to important gathering spaces, such as bars, clubs, and community centers.

== NYC Pride March ==
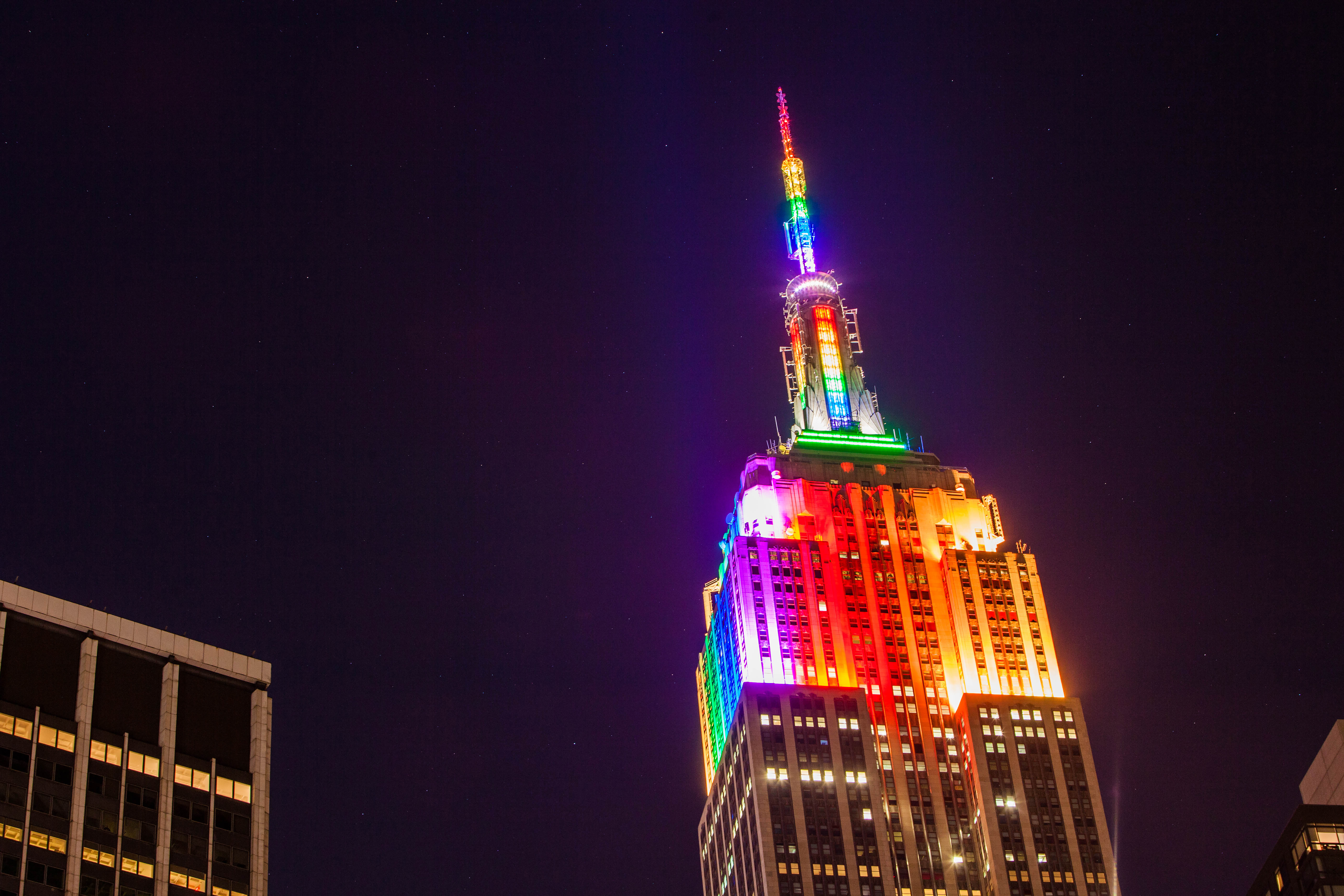

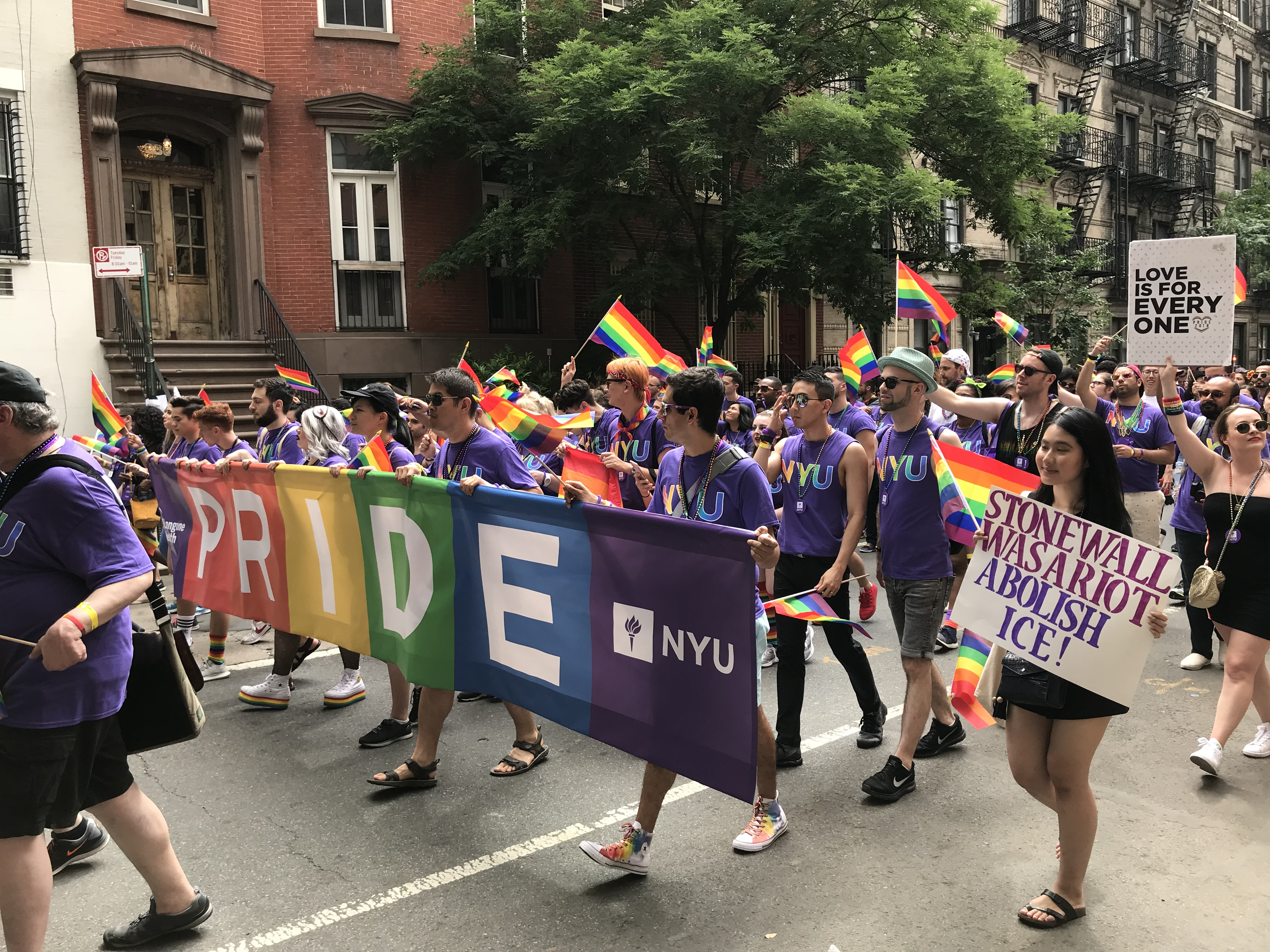
The Empire State Building displays the colors of the Rainbow Flag as an LGBT icon, top. The annual NYC Pride March (seen in 2018) is the world's largest LGBT event, imaged below.

The NYC Pride March, including the rally; PrideFest (the festival); and the Dance on the Pier, are the main events of Pride Week in New York City LGBT Pride Week. Since 1984, Heritage of Pride (HOP) has been the producer and organizer of pride events in New York City. The 2017 New York City Pride parade was the first in its history scheduled to be broadcast and streamed live.

Stonewall 50 – WorldPride NYC 2019 was the largest international Pride celebration in history, produced by Heritage of Pride and enhanced through a partnership with the I ❤ NY program's LGBT division, commemorating the 50th anniversary of the Stonewall uprising, with 150,000 participants and five million spectators attending in Manhattan alone. The events of 2019 were held throughout June, which is traditionally Pride month in New York City and worldwide, under the auspices of the annual NYC Pride March.

=== History of the New York City Pride March ===
Early on the morning of Saturday, June 28, 1969, gay (LGBT) individuals rioted following a police raid on the Stonewall Inn, a gay bar at 53 Christopher Street, in the West Village of Lower Manhattan. This riot and further protests and rioting over the following nights were the watershed moment in modern LGBT Rights Movement and the impetus for organizing LGBT pride marches on a much larger public scale.

On November 2, 1969, Craig Rodwell, his partner Fred Sargeant, Ellen Broidy, and Linda Rhodes proposed the first pride march to be held in New York City by way of a resolution at the Eastern Regional Conference of Homophile Organizations (ERCHO) meeting in Philadelphia.

That the Annual Reminder, to be more relevant, reach a greater number of people, and encompass the ideas and ideals of the larger struggle in which we are engaged-that of our fundamental human rights-be moved both in time and location.

We propose that a demonstration be held annually on the last Saturday in June in New York City to commemorate the 1969 spontaneous demonstrations on Christopher Street and this demonstration be called CHRISTOPHER STREET LIBERATION DAY. No dress or age regulations shall be made for this demonstration.

We also propose that we contact Homophile organizations throughout the country and suggest that they hold parallel demonstrations on that day. We propose a nationwide show of support.

All attendees to the ERCHO meeting in Philadelphia voted for the march except for Mattachine Society of New York, which abstained. Members of the Gay Liberation Front (GLF) attended the meeting and were seated as guests of Rodwell's group, Homophile Youth Movement in Neighborhoods (HYMN).

Meetings to organize the march began in early January at Rodwell's apartment in 350 Bleecker Street. At first there was difficulty getting some of the major New York organizations like Gay Activists Alliance (GAA) to send representatives. Craig Rodwell and his partner Fred Sargeant, Ellen Broidy, Michael Brown, Marty Nixon, and Foster Gunnison Jr. of The Mattachine Society made up the core group of the CSLD Umbrella Committee (CSLDUC). For initial funding, Gunnison served as treasurer and sought donations from the national homophile organizations and sponsors, while Sargeant solicited donations via the Oscar Wilde Memorial Bookshop customer mailing list and Nixon worked to gain financial support from GLF in his position as treasurer for that organization.

Other mainstays of the organizing committee were Judy Miller, Jack Waluska, Steve Gerrie and Brenda Howard of GLF. Believing that more people would turn out for the march on a Sunday, and so as to mark the date of the start of the Stonewall uprising, the CSLDUC scheduled the date for the first march for Sunday, June 28, 1970. With Dick Leitsch's replacement as president of Mattachine NY by Michael Kotis in April 1970, opposition to the march by The Mattachine Society ended.

There was little open animosity, and some bystanders applauded when a tall, pretty girl carrying a sign "I am a Lesbian" walked by.

— The New York Times coverage of Gay Liberation Day, 1970

Christopher Street Liberation Day on June 28, 1970, marked the first anniversary of the Stonewall riots with an assembly on Christopher Street and the first LGBT Pride march in U.S. history, covering the 51 blocks to Central Park. The march took less than half the scheduled time due to excitement, but also due to wariness about walking through the city with gay banners and signs. Although the parade permit was delivered only two hours before the start of the march, the marchers encountered little resistance from onlookers. The New York Times reported (on the front page) that the marchers took up the entire street for about 15 city blocks. Reporting by The Village Voice was positive, describing "the out-front resistance that grew out of the police raid on the Stonewall Inn one year ago".

=== New York City Dyke March ===
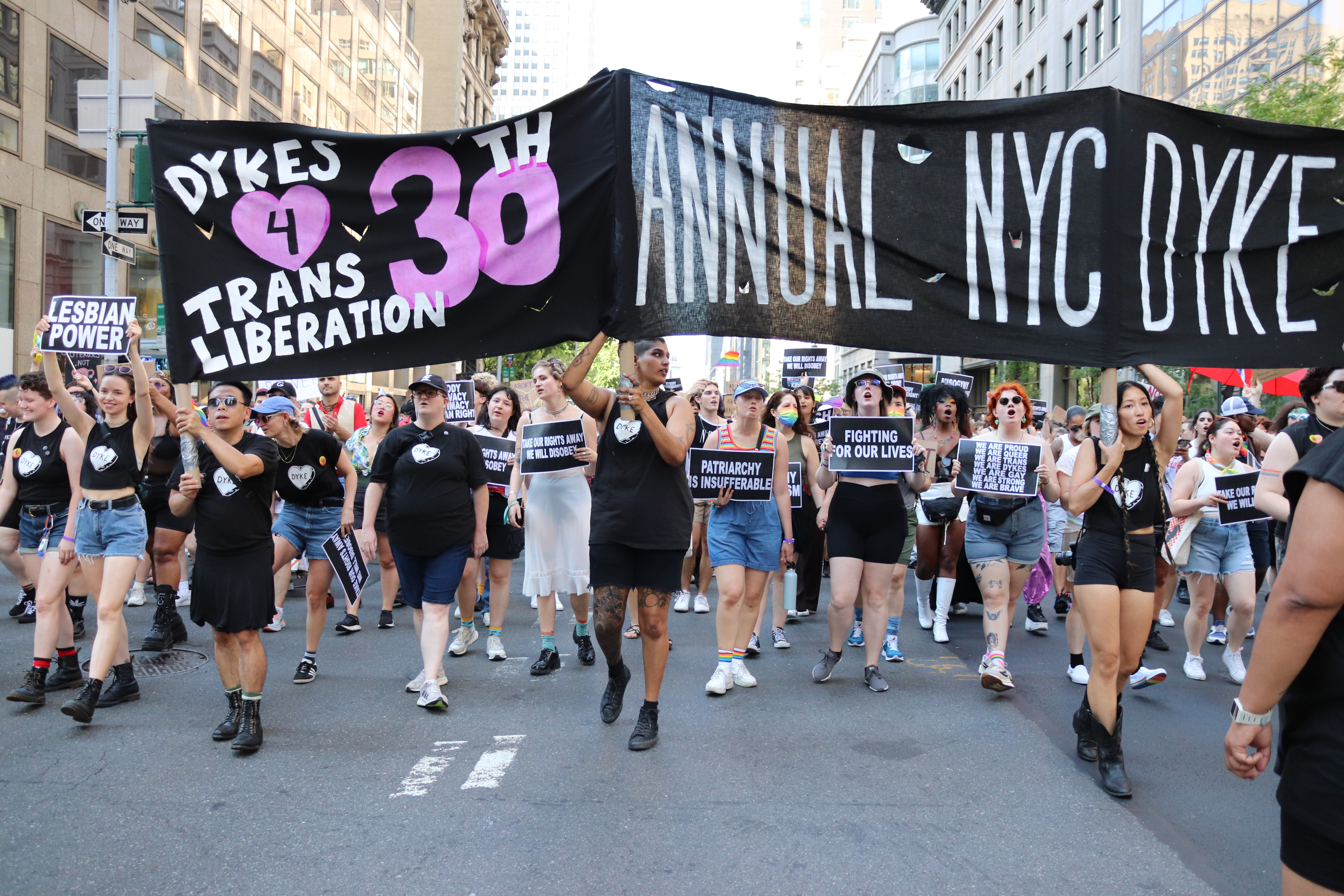
NYC Dyke March, 2022. The Manhattan march is the world's largest commemoration of lesbian pride and culture.

The world's largest dyke march, commemorating lesbian pride and culture, also takes place annually in June, based in Manhattan. The March typically includes a Dykes on Bikes motorcycle rally.

== New York City drag culture ==
New York City is home to the world's largest drag community and is known as the "Drag capital of the world". New York's drag culture and ballroom culture have both displayed a prominent presence within the overall LGBTQ culture of New York City itself. Both the film Paris is Burning from 1990 and the more recent television series Pose have portrayed the fabric of both drag and ballroom culture in New York City. RuPaul's DragCon NYC is known as the world's largest celebration of drag culture and attracts over 100,000 attendees over multiple-day festivities annually.

=== New York City Drag March ===
The New York City Drag March, or NYC Drag March, is an annual drag protest and visibility march taking place in June, the traditional LGBTQ pride month in New York City. Organized to coincide ahead of the NYC Pride March, both demonstrations commemorate the 1969 riots at the Stonewall Inn, widely considered the pivotal event sparking the gay liberation movement, and the modern fight for LGBT rights.

The Drag March takes place on Friday night as a kick-off to NYC Pride weekend. The event starts in Tompkins Square Park and ends in front of the Stonewall Inn; it is purposefully non-corporate, punk, inclusive, and largely leaderless.

In 2019, the 25th Drag March coincided with Stonewall 50 – WorldPride NYC 2019, anticipated to be the largest international LGBTQ event in history, with many as four million people attending in Manhattan alone; the Drag March took place June 28.

== Queens Pride Parade ==
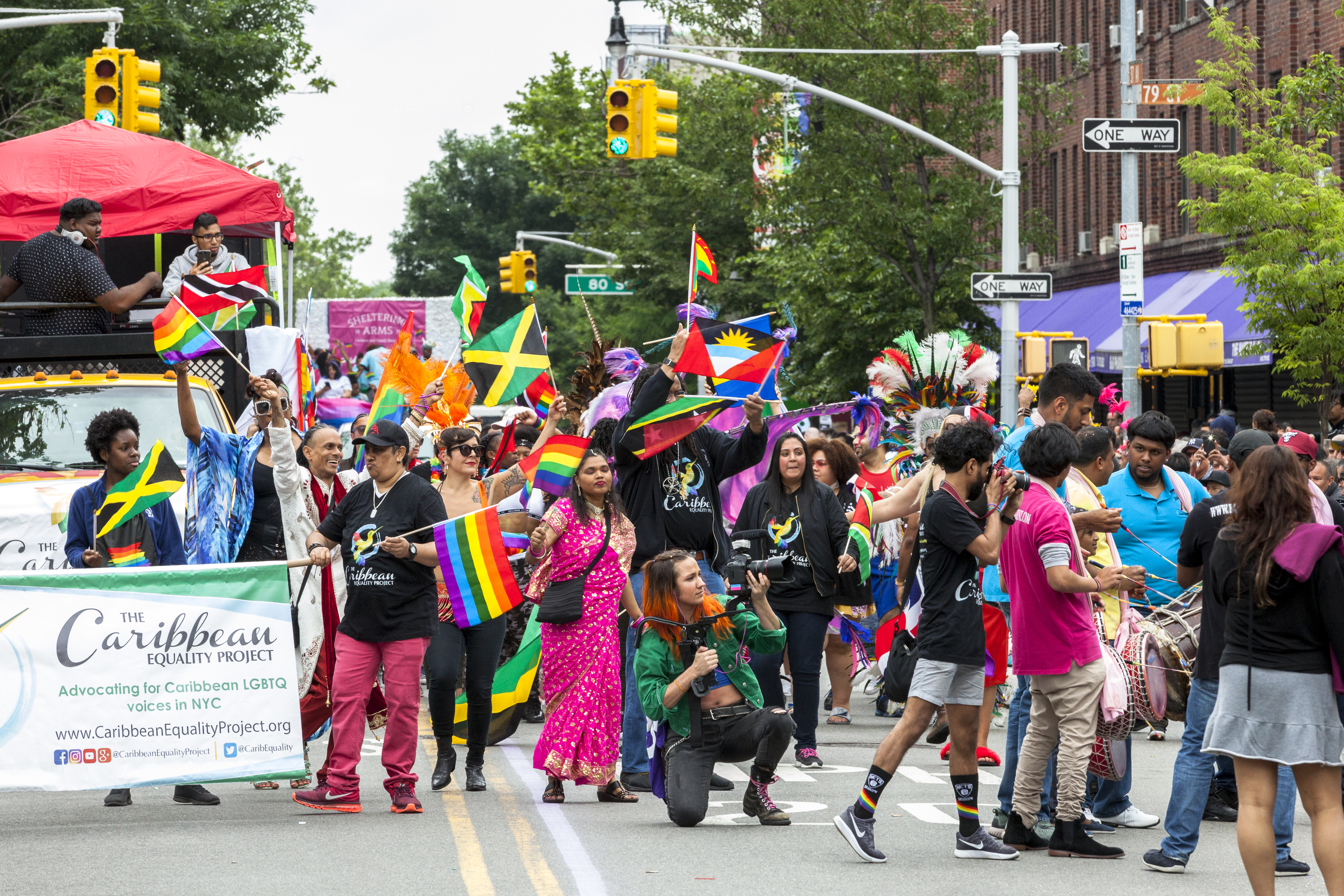

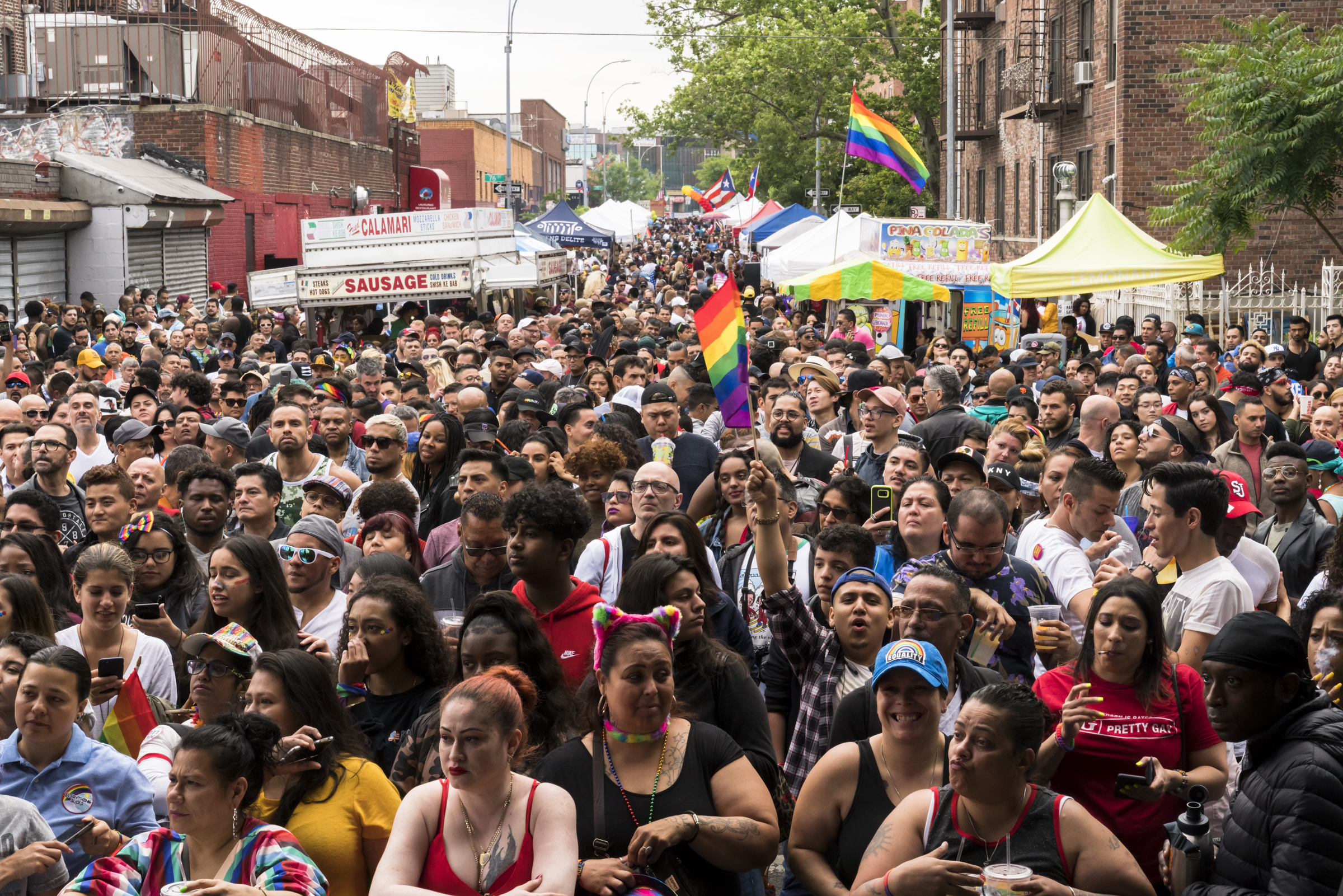
2018 Queens Pride Parade: Caribbean Equality Project at top, and the ensuing Multicultural Festival below

The Queens Pride Parade and Multicultural Festival is the second-oldest and second-largest pride parade in New York City. It is held annually in the neighborhood of Jackson Heights, located in the New York City borough of Queens. The parade was founded by Daniel Dromm and Maritza Martinez to raise the visibility of the LGBTQ community in Queens and memorialize Jackson Heights resident Julio Rivera. Queens also serves as the largest transgender hub in the Western Hemisphere and is the most ethnically diverse urban area in the world.

== Queer Liberation March ==
The Queer Liberation March is a protest march which was inaugurated in its current form on June 30, 2019, coincident with Stonewall 50 - WorldPride NYC 2019, marking the 50th anniversary of the Stonewall riots. This march was created as a counterprotest to the corporate-focused sponsoring and participation requirements of the larger New York City Pride March, the result being a dueling major Manhattan LGBTQ march on the same day.

The march route proceeds uptown on Sixth Avenue in Manhattan, following the path of the fledgling first one, which in 1970 marked the one-year anniversary of the Stonewall Riots. and was organized by the Christopher Street Liberation Day Committee. The Queer Liberation March proceeds in the opposite direction of the New York City Pride March, which courses downtown on Fifth Avenue through most of its route.

== LGBTQ media ==
LGBTQ publications include Gay City News, GO, and MetroSource. Out FM is an LGBTQ talk radio show.

Former publications include Gaysweek, The New York Blade, Next, and New York Native. Come!Unity Press was a gay anarchist print and communications collective in Lower Manhattan in the 1970s.

The film Paris is Burning documents the cultural contributions of gay, bisexual and trans New Yorkers mostly from Harlem; especially those of color coming from mostly Black or Latino backgrounds. Much of the documentary centers around drag culture. African American and Latino members of the LGBTQ community in the 80s invented dances such as vogueing and coined terms such as 'reading' and 'throwing shade.' The independent documentary How Do I Look and the TV series Pose on FX expanded further upon the subject matter of and individuals appearing in Paris is Burning.

== Celebrity-featured New York City LGBTQ-rights galas and festivities ==
New York City hosts a variety of LGBTQ-rights galas annually. The following is a list of some of these galas featuring the presence of celebrities:

- October 2004, Empire State Pride Agenda – Kimberly Guilfoyle
- March 2010, amfAR, The Foundation for AIDS Research – Ricky Martin, Kylie Minogue
- February 2017, Human Rights Campaign – Meryl Streep, Seth Meyers
- New Year's Eve before 2019 and at other times, surprise performances at the Stonewall Inn by Madonna
- January 2019, New York City Women's March – U.S. Representative Alexandria Ocasio-Cortez (NY), giving a detailed speech in support of measures needed to ensure LGBTQ equality
- The GLAAD Media Awards New York takes places annually and features the attendance of highly prominent celebrities. The May 2019 event featured Rosie O'Donnell, Anderson Cooper, and Mykki Blanco presenting Madonna with a GLAAD Advocate for Acceptance award.
- June 2019, surprise performance at the Stonewall Inn by Taylor Swift
- In 2023, Billy Porter and Randy Wicker lead NYC Pride under the theme "Strength in Solidarity," combining its protest origins and celebration, with Christina Aguilera at Pride Island.

== Education ==
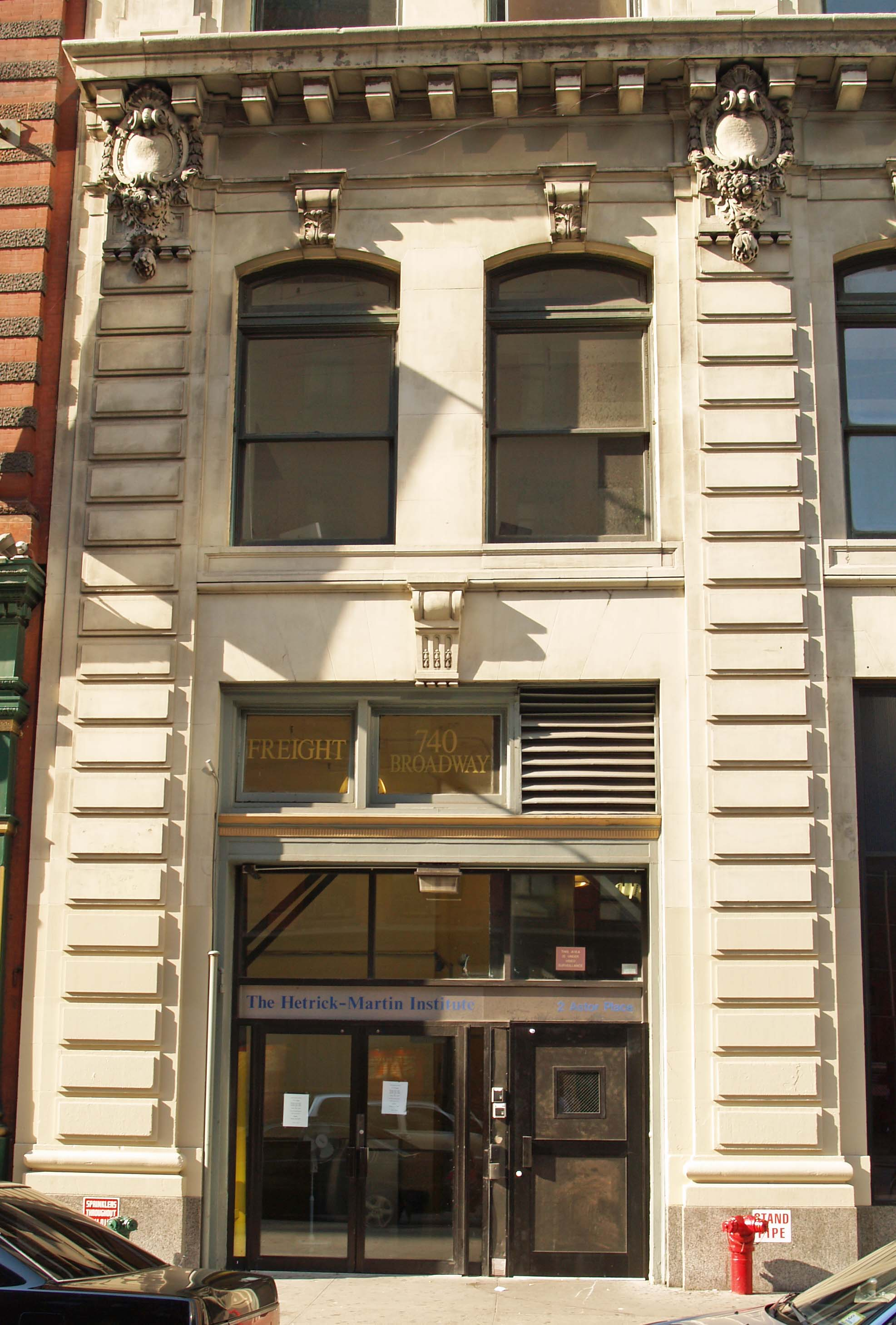
The entrance to Harvey Milk High School

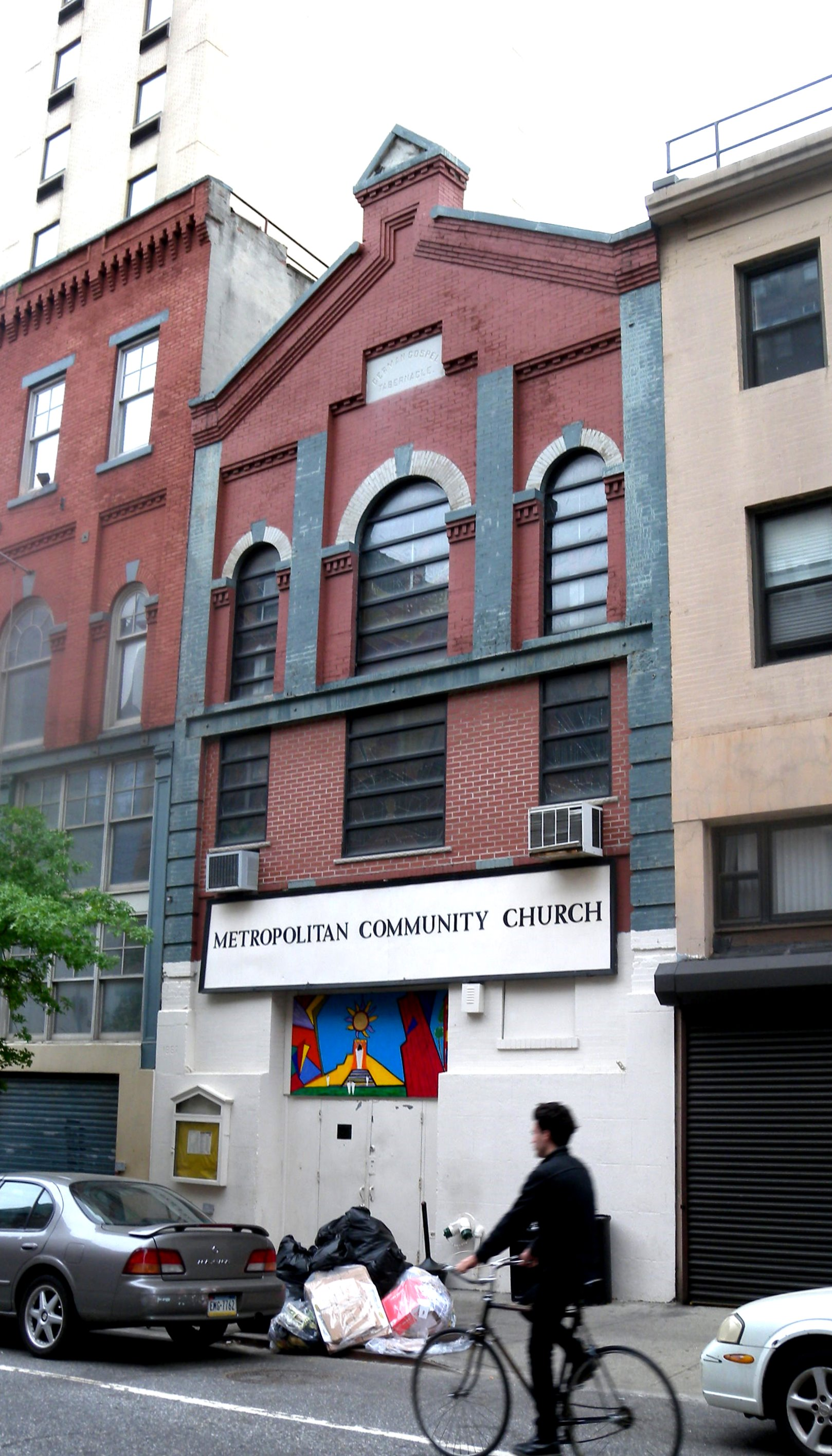
Metropolitan Community Church of New York

The New York City Department of Education operates Harvey Milk High School in Manhattan; it caters to but is not limited to LGBT students.

== Recreation ==
Heritage of Pride or NYC Pride organizes LGBT community events such as the LGBT Pride March. The New York Lesbian, Gay, Bisexual, & Transgender Film Festival is held in the city. MIX NYC organizes other LGBT film festivals. The Fresh Fruit Festival exhibits works of LGBT artists. The New York Gallery Tours company offers a monthly LGBT art gallery tour.

Historically, the St. Patrick's Day Parade has not allowed openly LGBT groups to participate. However, the organizers announced that in 2015, the first LGBT group would be permitted to have a float, and LGBT representation has been included in the annual New York St. Patrick's Day Parade since then.

New York City Black Pride is held annually in August.

New York City's Latino Pride Center was established in June 2013 as the first Latino organization in the U.S. fully devoted to providing health and human services to the Latino gay community.

Rainbow Book Fair, the largest LGBT book event in the U.S., is held annually every Spring in New York City.

The Basketdolls is a recreational basketball league established in June 2024 in New York City. Founded by Devin Myers, the organization operates primarily in Brooklyn's Bushwick neighborhood and serves transgender participants. The league conducted its inaugural season from June 1 to September 2024, hosting 15 meetings at various public courts throughout New York City. The league operates under a community-based model rather than following traditional competitive league structures. As of 2024, league administration is overseen by founder Myers and organizer Nora Rodriguez. As of 2024, the organization conducts its activities primarily on public basketball courts throughout New York City's five boroughs.

Certain nail salons provide manicures specifically for preferred by the LGBTQ community.

== Religion ==
Congregation Beit Simchat Torah ("CBST") is a Jewish synagogue located in Manhattan. It was founded in 1973 and is the world's largest LGBTQ synagogue. The Metropolitan Community Church of New York (MCCNY) in the Hell's Kitchen neighborhood of Midtown Manhattan is affiliated with the worldwide Metropolitan Community Church.

The progressive Jewish congregation Kolot Chayeinu (Voices of our Lives) was founded by social justice activists Rabbi Ellen Lippmann and Cantor Lisa Segal. The current clergies are members of the LGBTQ community and a large portion of the congregation are members or affiliated with the LGBTQ community.

== See also ==
- Culture of New York City
- Drag culture in New York City
- GAPIMNY
- Homosocialization
- La Escuelita
- LGBTQ in the United States
- LGBTQ rights in New York
- LGBTQ rights in the United States
- Murder of Mark Carson
- New York City demographics
- New York City Gay Men's Chorus
- Pose
- Queens Liberation Front
- St. Pat's for All
- The Boys in the Band
- The Queen
- Transgender culture of New York City
- Q-Wave
- Wigstock
