= Out FM =

American radio show

- Genre: Talk Radio
- Running time: 60 minutes
- Country of origin: United States
- Language: English
- Home station: WBAI
- Syndicates: Pacifica Radio
- Recording studio: New York, New York
- No. of episodes: 1000+
- Opening theme: "Together" by Betty
- Website: outfm.org

Out FM is an anti-racist, progressive LGBTQ public affairs and culture talk radio show airing on Tuesday evenings from 8 pm to 9 pm on WBAI 99.5 fm, Pacifica Radio in New York City. Founded in 1982 (as The Gay Show) the Encyclopedia of Lesbian, Gay, Bisexual, and Transgender History called it "one of the oldest and longest-running queer programs in the United States.

Produced by and for lesbian, gay, bisexual, transgender, two-spirit, non-binary, gender non-conforming, intersex, queer, and questioning communities.

Guests have included intellectuals such as Urvashi Vaid and Dean Spade, political figures such as Larry Kramer and Rosie Mendez, and artists such as Jim Brochu and Jewelle Gomez.

== See also ==
- LGBT culture in New York City
