= Come!Unity Press =

Gay anarchist print collective in New York City

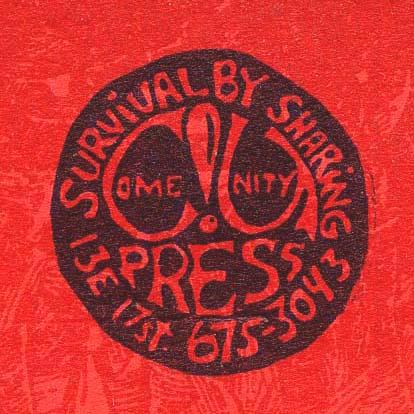
- Come!Unity Press printer's mark
- Established: 1971
- Defunct: 1980s
- Type: Anarchist collective
- Location(s): 13 East 17th Street; Manhattan, New York City, US
- Services: Printing and communications services

Come!Unity Press was a gay anarchist print and communications collective in Lower Manhattan, New York City. The group operated a printing facility out of a large, dilapidated loft at 13 East 17th Street from 1971 until at least 1980. The collective printed literature including pamphlets and posters for community groups; high school, college, and workplace organizations; and social and political justice groups focused on topics including gay rights; women's liberation; anti-fascism; rights for Native Americans, Puerto Ricans, African Americans, and other communities of color; and humanitarian issues in Vietnam. Printing help and materials were provided for free, pay what you can, or barter, and the collective freely taught printing skills to those seeking to use their facilities.

== Printing ==
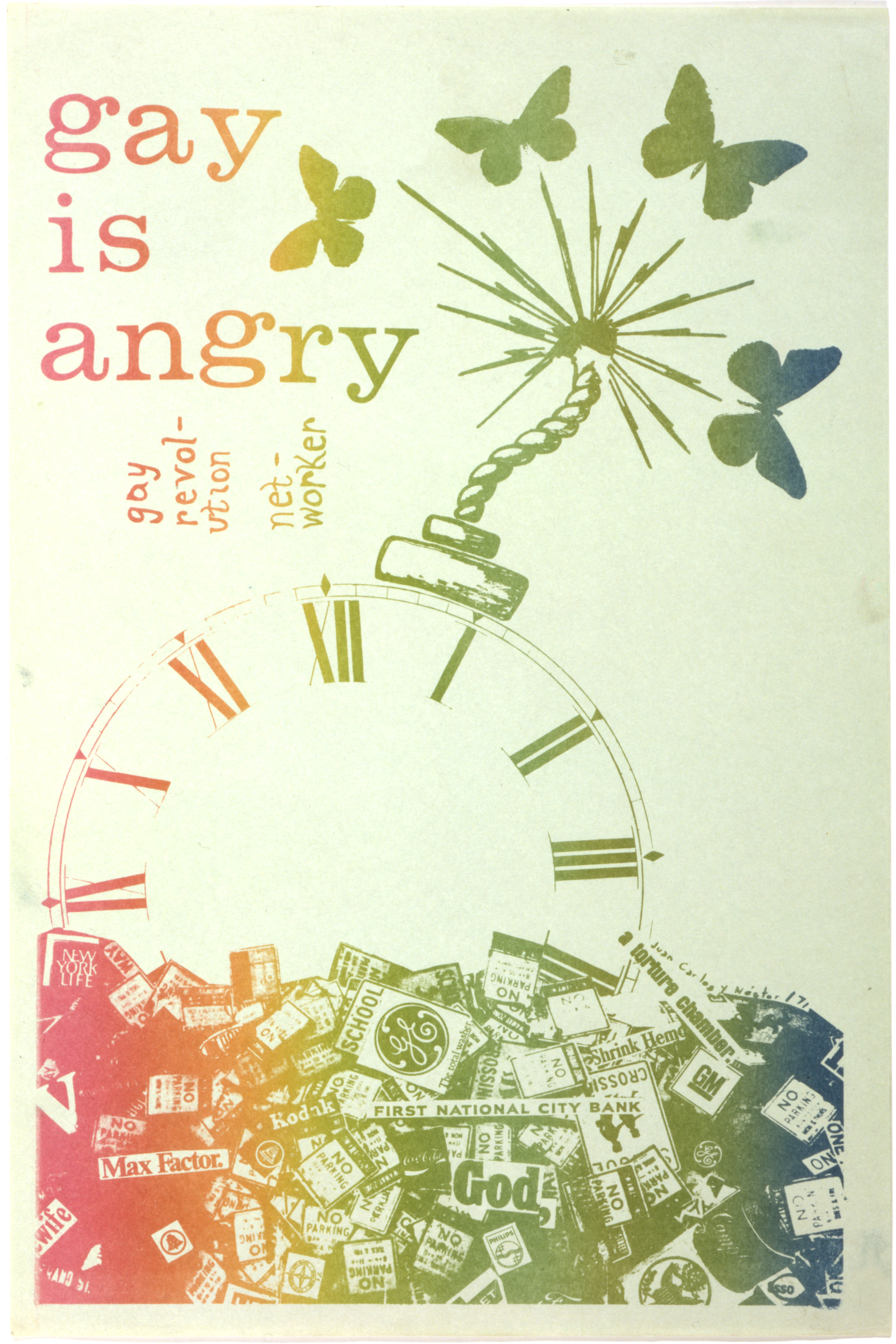
A 1971 Come!Unity Press poster demonstrating their distinctive rainbow ink style

Printing help and materials were provided for free, pay what you can, or barter. The collective helped to teach layout and printing skills to those who came to have materials printed. Those with the financial means were asked to pay the commercial rate or higher for printing; those who could not were asked to cover supplies costs, or less if they were unable. The collective also solicited donations of money, supplies, food, and labor via statements included in the materials they printed.

The collective printed literature, pamphlets, and posters for community groups; high school, college, and workplace organizations; and social and political justice groups focused on topics including gay rights; women's liberation; anti-fascism; rights for Native Americans, Puerto Ricans, African Americans, and other communities of color; and humanitarian issues in Vietnam. They maintained some editorial control over the contents of the materials printed using their facilities, which sometimes resulted in protracted disputes over the political correctness of the materials.

Materials printed by the collective often had a distinctive, rainbow style created by adding different colors of inks to the trough or smearing it directly onto the rollers of the offset lithographic press — sometimes while the machine was running. Groups often printed their literature onto waste paper from previous print runs, resulting in a palimpsestic effect.

Come!Unity Press regularly included slogans alongside or within their printer's mark, which included "Survival by Sharing", "Unplug from Profit" and "Equal Access to the Poor, Printing Movement Alternatives to Imperialism, War and Rape". They also liberally used rainbows and marijuana leaves in their graphic design to communicate their views on gay rights and anarchism.

== Collective ==
Some members of the Come!Unity Press collective lived in the loft at 13 East 17th Street. Members were not paid salaries, and the printing fees and donations went to rent, supplies, utilities, and other costs. Printing materials, food, and marijuana were freely shared.

== History ==
By 1971, anarchists named Lin and Debbie had entered into an arrangement with a Quaker group, the American Friends Service Committee, that was operating a print shop out of a run-down loft at 13 East 17th Street. Lin and Debbie had volunteered to run the A. B. Dick 360 printing press for the Quakers in exchange for being allowed to live in the loft. The relationship between the anarchists and the Quakers was strained, with an early member of the collective recounting that Lin and Debbie were "aggressively anarchist and definitely given to provocation", and conflicts ultimately led the Quakers to move out of the loft, leaving the anarchists with the printing press and responsibility for the lease.

At first, Come!Unity Press was a 24-hour open access printing facility that only printed publications that would be distributed freely to those who could not afford them, requiring them to include on their cover a statement along the lines of "this publication is free, but donations are invited to cover the cost". By 1975, the collective had instituted nominal working hours of 2 p.m. to 2 a.m., and in the late 1970s they began accepting commercial work to help offset costs.

Several museums and university libraries, including New York University Libraries, Cornell University Library, and the Oakland Museum of California, maintain collections of materials printed at Come!Unity Press.

== Gallery ==
Materials printed at Come!Unity Press

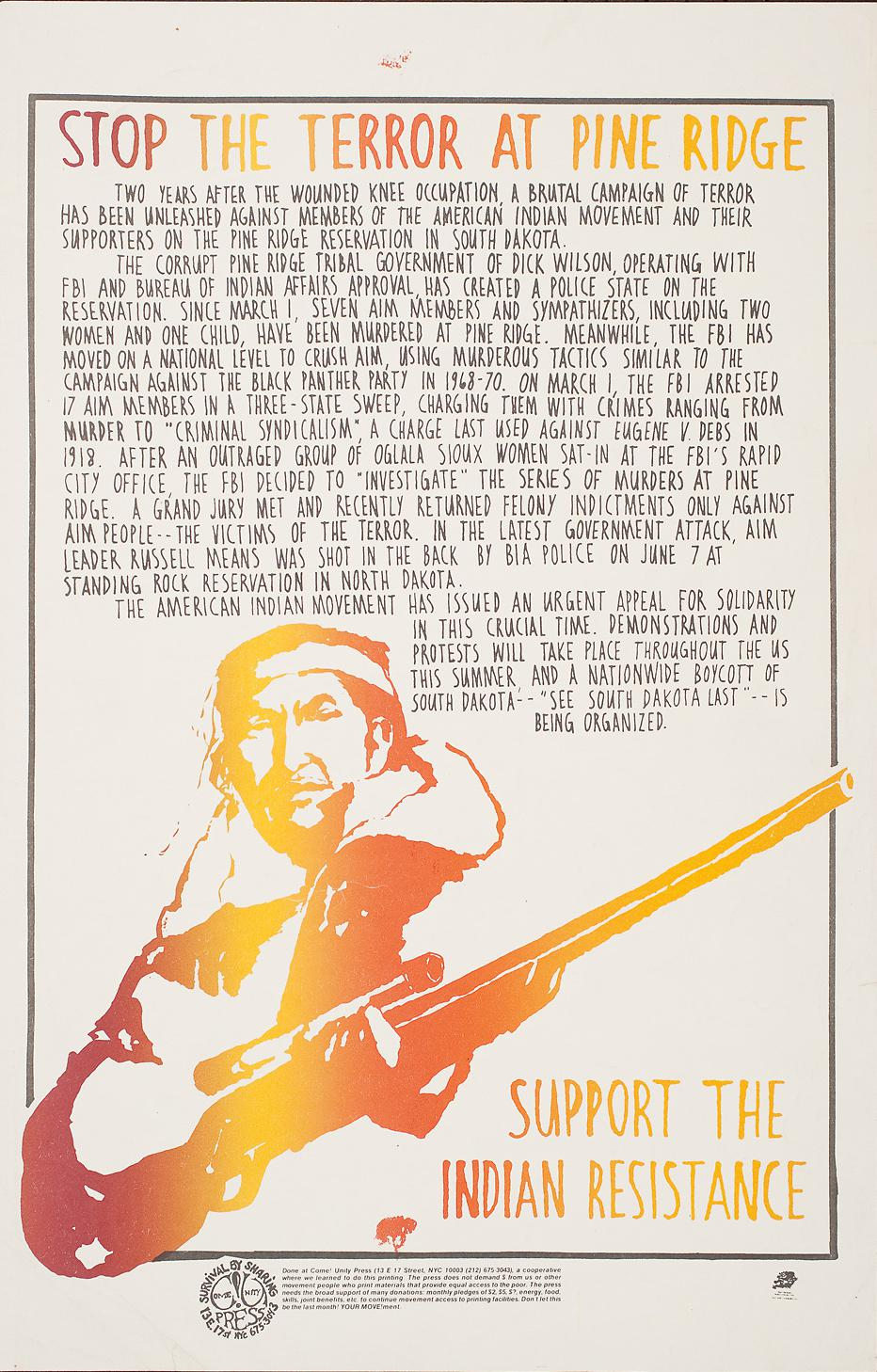
1973 poster supporting the American Indian Movement

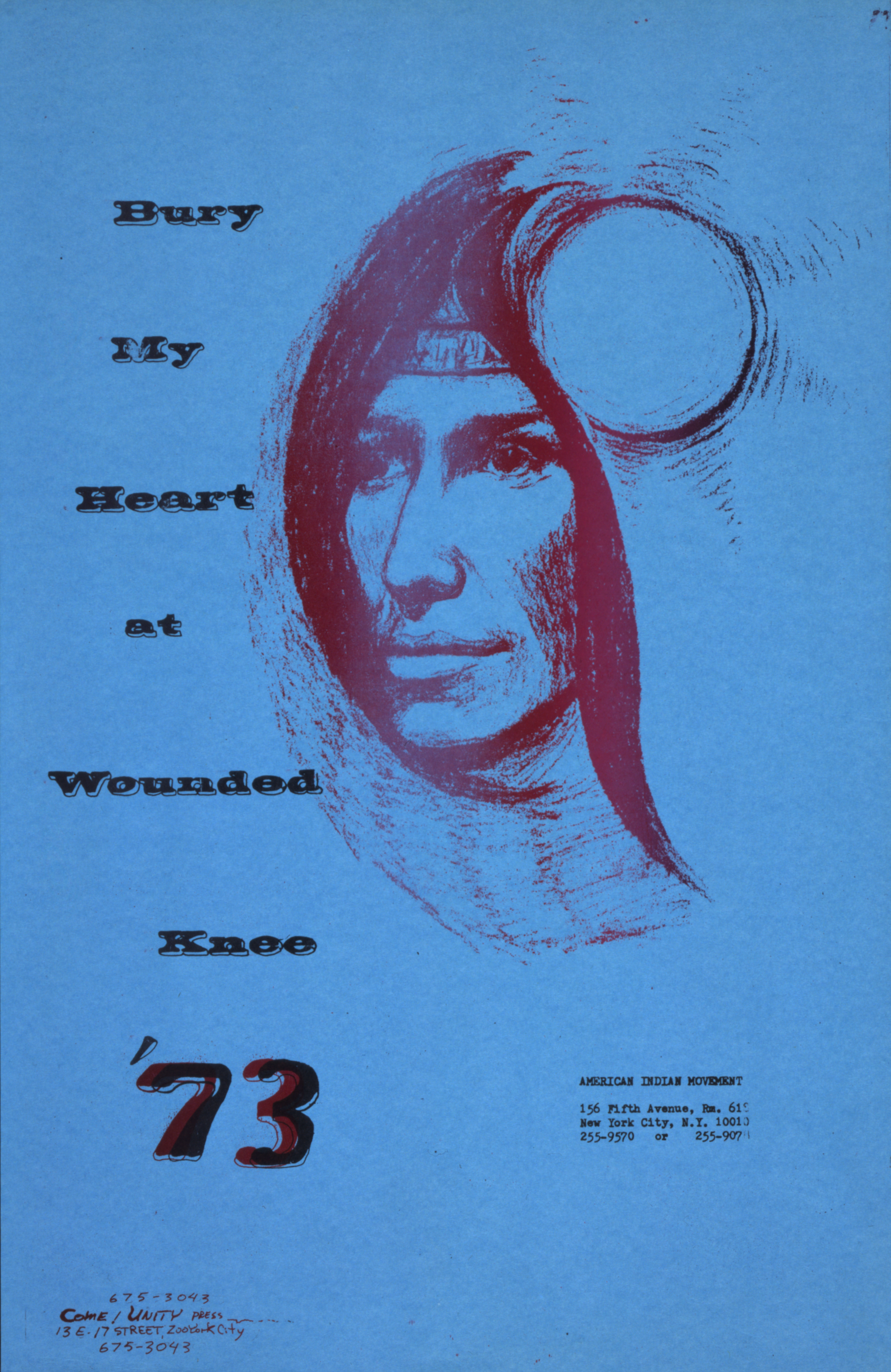
1973 poster supporting the American Indian Movement

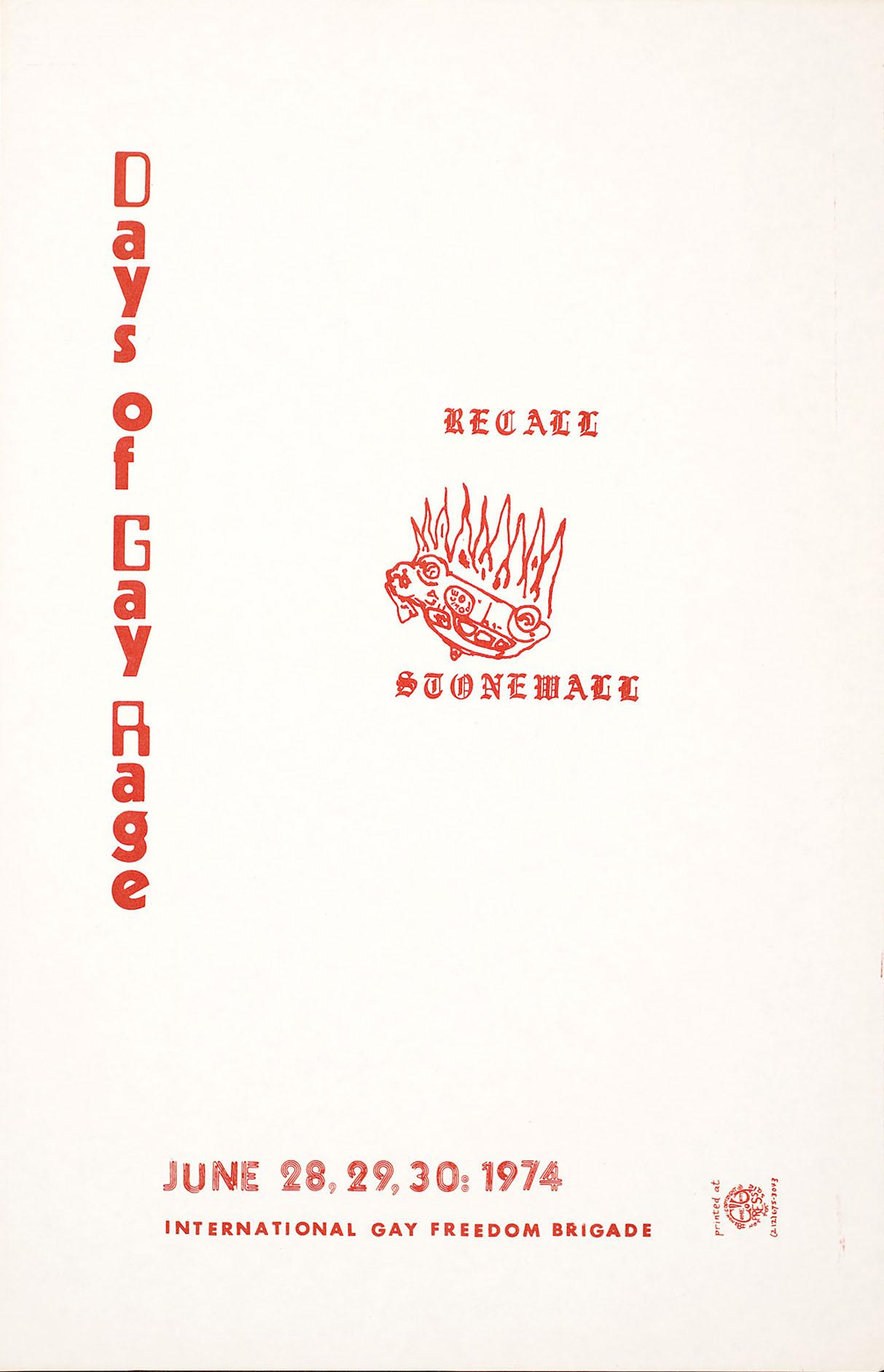
1974 poster by the International Gay Freedom Brigade

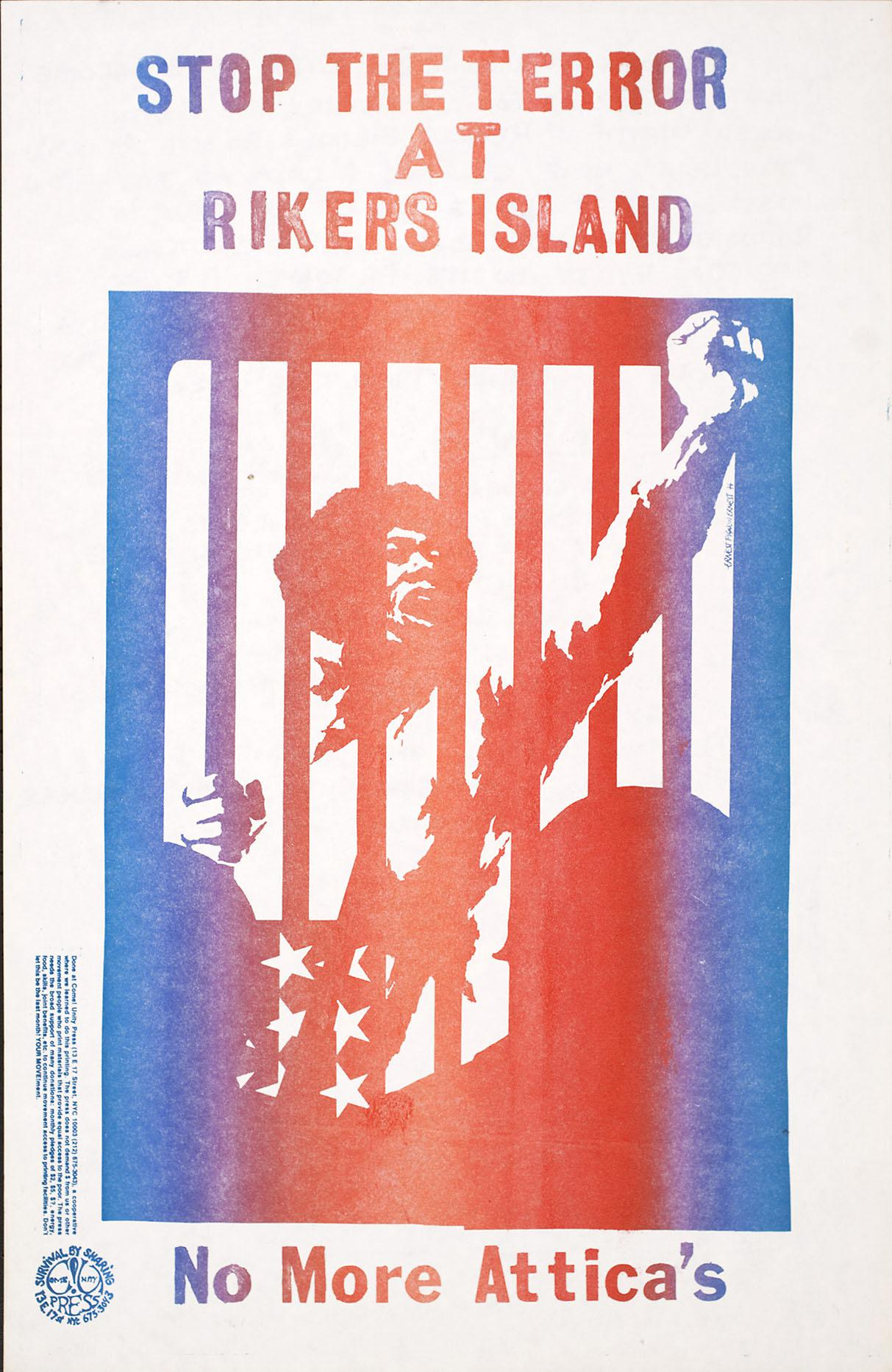
1974 poster protesting conditions at Rikers Island

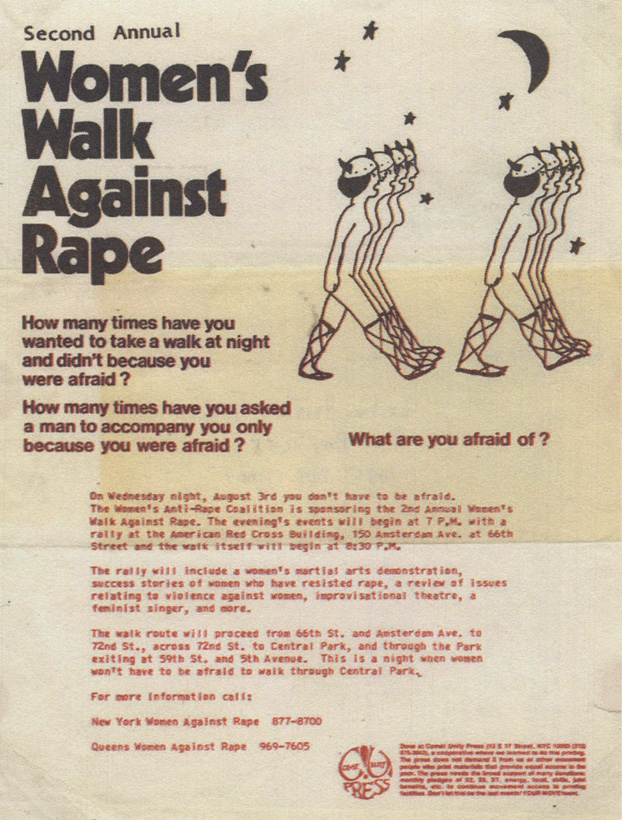
1976 flyer

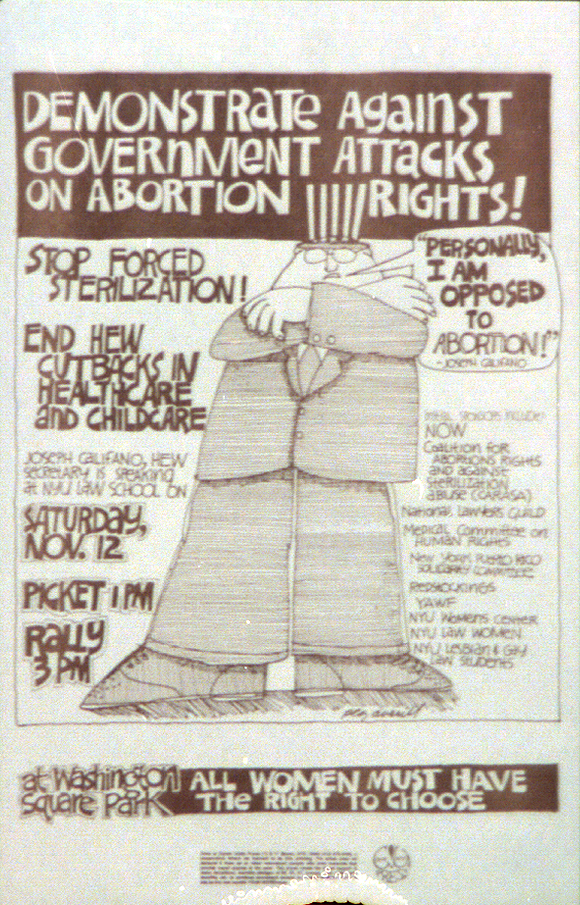
1977 poster announcing an abortion rights protest

== See also ==
- Anarchism and the arts
