= LGBTQ demographics of the United States =

LGBTQ adult percentage by state in 2015–2016: 2-2.9% 3-3.9% 4-4.9% 5-9%

The demographics of sexual orientation and gender identity in the United States have been studied in the social sciences in recent decades. A 2025 Gallup poll concluded that 9.3% of adult Americans identified as LGBTQ+. A different survey in 2025, from the Williams Institute, estimated that 0.8% of U.S. adults identify as transgender. As of 2025, estimates for the total percentage of U.S. adults that are transgender or nonbinary range from 0.8% to 1.1%. Additionally, a Pew Research survey from 2022 found that approximately 5% of young adults in the U.S. say their gender is different from their sex assigned at birth.

Studies from several nations, including the U.S., conducted at varying time periods, have produced a statistical range of 1.2 to 6.8 percent of the adult population identifying as LGBTQ. Online surveys tend to yield higher figures than other methods, a likely result of the higher degree of anonymity of Internet surveys, and demographic of those utilizing online platforms which elicit reduced levels of socially desirable responding.

== State-by-state summary ==
Pop. rank	% rank	State or territory	2015–2016 LGBTQ adult percentage estimate	2012 state total population estimate	2012 LGBTQ adult population estimate	2000 same-sex couple households	2010 same-sex couple households	2000 to 2010 couple households growth	2016 transgender adult percentage estimate
1	4	California	4.9%	38,041,430	1,338,164	92,138	98,153	6.53%	0.76%
2	26	Texas	3.6%	26,084,481	579,968	42,912	46,401	8.13%	0.66%
3	10	New York	4.5%	19,570,261	570,388	46,490	48,932	4.05%	0.51%
4	13	Florida	4.2%	19,317,568	513,849	41,048	48,496	18.15%	0.66%
5	20	Illinois	3.9%	12,875,255	362,048	22,887	23,049	0.07%	0.51%
6	27	Pennsylvania	3.6%	12,763,536	262,308	21,166	22,336	5.50%	0.44%
7	24	Ohio	3.8%	11,544,225	315,592	18,937	19,684	3.95%	0.45%
8	19	Georgia	4.0%	9,919,945	263,870	19,288	21,318	10.52%	0.75%
9	23	Michigan	3.8%	9,883,360	285,431	15,368	14,598	-5.0%	0.43%
10	32	North Carolina	3.5%	9,752,073	244,582	16,198	18,309	11.36%	0.60%
11	28	New Jersey	3.6%	8,864,590	249,273	16,604	16,875	1.60%	0.44%
12	34	Virginia	3.4%	8,185,867	180,416	13,802	14,243	3.20%	0.55%
13	9	Washington	4.6%	6,897,012	209,670	15,900	19,003	19.51%	0.62%
14	3	Massachusetts	4.9%	6,646,144	247,247	17,099	20,256	18.46%	0.57%
15	17	Arizona	4.0%	6,553,255	194,238	12,332	15,817	28.25%	0.62%
16	15	Indiana	4.1%	6,537,334	183,829	10,219	11,074	8.37%	0.56%
17	42	Tennessee	3.1%	6,456,243	127,526	10,189	10,898	6.95%	0.63%
18	36	Missouri	3.4%	6,021,988	151,032	9,428	10,557	10.70%	0.54%
19	21	Maryland	3.9%	5,884,563	147,584	11,243	12,538	11.52%	0.49%
20	35	Wisconsin	3.4%	5,726,398	121,858	8,232	9,179	10.32%	0.43%
21	18	Minnesota	4.0%	5,379,139	118,556	9,147	10,207	11.60%	0.59%
22	12	Colorado	4.3%	5,187,582	126,162	10,045	12,424	23.70%	0.53%
23	45	Alabama	3.0%	4,822,023	102,613	8,109	6,582	-18.80%	0.61%
24	48	South Carolina	3.0%	4,723,723	104,111	7,609	7,214	5.20%	0.58%
25	25	Louisiana	3.7%	4,601,893	111,918	8,808	8,076	-8.31%	0.60%
26	39	Kentucky	3.3%	4,380,415	129,836	7,114	7,195	1.13%	0.53%
27	5	Oregon	4.9%	3,899,353	145,212	8,932	11,773	31.80%	0.65%
28	31	Oklahoma	3.5%	3,814,820	98,575	5,763	6,134	6.44%	0.64%
29	33	Connecticut	3.5%	3,590,347	92,775	7,386	7,852	6.30%	0.44%
30	40	Iowa	3.2%	3,074,186	65,419	3,698	4,093	10.70%	0.31%
31	41	Mississippi	3.2%	2,984,926	58,982	4,774	3,484	-27.00%	0.61%
32	46	Arkansas	3.0%	2,949,131	78,441	4,423	4,226	-4.45%	0.60%
33	43	Kansas	3.1%	2,885,905	81,152	3,973	4,009	0.09%	0.43%
34	38	Utah	3.3%	2,855,287	58,591	3,360	5,814	73.03%	0.36%
35	6	Nevada	4.8%	2,758,931	88,065	4,973	7,140	43.60%	0.61%
36	14	New Mexico	4.2%	2,085,538	45,965	4,496	5,825	25.56%	0.75%
37	29	Nebraska	3.6%	1,855,525	38,075	2,332	2,356	0.01%	0.39%
38	37	West Virginia	3.4%	1,855,413	43,713	2,916	2,848	-2.33%	0.42%
39	49	Idaho	2.8%	1,595,728	32,744	1,873	2,042	9.02%	0.41%
40	22	Hawaii	3.8%	1,392,313	53,966	2,389	3,239	35.45%	0.78%
41	11	Maine	4.5%	1,329,192	48,489	3,394	3,958	16.61%	0.50%
42	8	New Hampshire	4.6%	1,320,718	31,138	2,703	3,260	20.60%	0.43%
43	16	Rhode Island	4.0%	1,050,292	35,920	2,471	2,785	12.71%	0.51%
44	47	Montana	3.0%	1,005,141	19,862	1,218	1,848	10.70%	0.34%
45	7	Delaware	4.7%	917,092	23,698	1,868	2,646	41.65%	0.64%
46	51	South Dakota	2.0%	833,354	27,867	826	714	-13.36%	0.34%
47	44	Alaska	3.0%	731,449	24,869	1,180	1,228	4.06%	0.49%
48	50	North Dakota	2.7%	699,628	9,040	703	559	-20.50%	0.30%
49	1	District of Columbia	8.6%	632,323	63,232	3,678	4,822	31.10%	2.77%
50	2	Vermont	5.3%	626,011	23,313	1,933	2,143	10.61%	0.59%
51	30	Wyoming	3.5%	576,412	16,716	807	657	-18.60%	0.32%
—	—	Total	3.8%	Total population: 313,914,039 Adult population: 238,574,670 (76% of total population; 2010 US Census)	9,083,558	594,391	646,464	8.76%	0.58%

== By locality ==
The American cities with the highest gay populations are New York City with 272,493, Los Angeles with 154,270, Chicago with 114,449, and San Francisco with 94,234, as estimated by the Williams Institute in 2006. However, gay residents are much more likely to be encountered in San Francisco, Seattle, Atlanta, Minneapolis, and Boston because a higher percentage of those cities' residents are gay or lesbian.

The U.S. metropolitan areas with the most gay residents are the New York metro with 568,903; followed by Los Angeles metro with 442,211; and the Chicago metro with 288,748. (Note: The study cited is unclear as to the exact metro NY area that is included; on table 5, page 8, "New York–Northern New Jersey–Long Island" is included, but in Appendix 2, page 15, Pennsylvania also seems to be included as it states "New York–Northern New Jersey–Long Island, New York–NJ–PA")

The charts list the top U.S. cities (in alphabetical order), metropolitan areas, and states with the highest population of gay residents and the highest percentage of gay residents (GLB population as a percentage of total residents based on available census data). The numbers given are estimates based on American Community Survey data for the year 2006.

=== By city ===
Cities with the highest percentage of LGBT people in 2006.

% Rank	City	2005 LGBT percentage estimate	2005 LGBT population estimate
1	San Francisco	15.4%	94,234
2	Seattle	12.9%	57,993
3	Atlanta	12.8%	39,805
4	Minneapolis	12.5%	34,295
5	Boston	12.3%	50,450
6	Sacramento	9.8%	32,108
7	Portland, OR	8.8%	35,413
8	Denver	8.2%	33,698
9	Washington, D.C.	8.1%	32,599
10	Orlando	7.7%	12,508
11	Salt Lake City	7.6%	10,726
13	Baltimore	6.9%	30,779
14	Hartford	6.8%	5,292
15	Rochester	6.8%	9,371
16	San Diego	6.8%	61,945
17	St. Louis	6.8%	16,868
18	Columbus	6.7%	34,952
19	Kansas City	6.7%	22,360
20	Phoenix	6.4%	63,222
21	Tampa	6.1%	14,119
22	San Jose	5.8%	37,260
23	Chicago	5.7%	114,449
24	Birmingham	5.6%	9,263
25	Los Angeles	5.6%	154,270
26	Miami	5.5%	15,227
27	Nashville-Davidson	5.1%	20,313
28	New Orleans	5.1%	16,554
29	Austin	4.8%	24,615
30	Indianapolis	4.8%	26,712
31	Providence	4.8%	5,564
32	Las Vegas	4.6%	17,925
33	Milwaukee	4.6%	18,243
34	New York City	4.5%	272,493
35	Houston	4.4%	61,976

=== By metropolitan area ===
Metropolitan Area	2005 % LGB Est.	2005 LGB Pop. Est.	2012–2014 % LGBTQ Est.	2021 % LGBTQ Est.	2021 LGBTQ Pop. Est.	2005-2021 Change in LGBTQ Pop. Est.
San Francisco-Oakland-Berkeley, CA MSA	8.2%	256,313	6.2%	6.7%	247,000	-9,313 ▼
Portland-Vancouver-Hillsboro, OR-WA MSA	6.1%	94,027	5.4%	6.0%	112,000	17,973 ▲
Austin-Round Rock-Georgetown, TX MSA	5.9%	61,732	5.3%	5.9%	90,000	28,268 ▲
Seattle-Tacoma, WA CSA	6.5%	154,835	4.8%	5.2%	152,000	-2,835 ▼
Los Angeles-Long Beach-Anaheim, CA MSA	4.8%	442,211	4.6%	5.1%	523,000	80,789 ▲
Las Vegas-Henderson-Paradise, NV MSA	3.9%	48,532	4.3%	5.1%	82,000	33,468 ▲
Orlando-Kissimmee-Sanford, FL MSA	5.7%	81,272	4.1%	5.0%	93,000	11,728 ▲
Boston-Cambridge-Newton, MA-NH MSA	6.2%	201,344	4.8%	4.9%	186,000	-15,344 ▼
Denver-Aurora-Lakewood, CO MSA	5.8%	99,027	4.6%	4.8%	103,000	3,973 ▲
Tampa-St. Petersburg-Clearwater, FL MSA	5.9%	119,044	4.1%	4.8%	113,000	-6,044 ▼
Tucson, AZ MSA				4.7%	37,000	N/A
New Orleans-Metairie, LA MSA	3.7%	35,230	5.1%	4.7%	46,000	10,770 ▲
Salt Lake City, UT MSA	3.7%	26,761	4.7%	4.7%	39,000	12,239 ▲
Hartford-East Hartford-Middletown, CT MSA	5.6%	49,000	4.6%	4.6%	44,000	-5,000 ▼
Atlanta-Sandy Springs-Alpharetta, GA MSA	5.1%	180,168	4.2%	4.6%	194,000	13,832 ▲
Indianapolis-Carmel-Anderson, IN MSA	4.5%	52,963	4.2%	4.5%	68,000	15,037 ▲
San Diego-Chula Vista-Carlsbad, CA MSA	4.9%	102,016	3.9%	4.5%	115,000	12,984 ▲
Washington-Arlington-Alexandria, DC-VA-MD-WV MSA	5.0%	191,959	4.0%	4.5%	209,000	17,041 ▲
Miami-Fort Lauderdale-Pompano Beach, FL MSA	4.5%	183,346	4.2%	4.5%	214,000	30,654 ▲
Worcester, MA-CT MSA				4.5%	33,000	N/A
New York-Newark-Jersey City, NY-NJ-PA MSA	4.1%	568,903	4.0%	4.5%	706,000	137,097 ▲
Providence-Warwick, RI-MA MSA	3.6%	43,417	4.4%	4.5%	58,000	14,583 ▲
Sacramento-Roseville-Folsom, CA MSA	5.5%	81,759	3.9%	4.4%	77,000	-4,759 ▼
Albuquerque, NM MSA				4.4%	31,000	N/A
Columbus, OH MSA	5.5%	68,300	4.3%	4.4%	67,000	-1,300 ▼
San Antonio-New Braunfels, TX MSA	3.5%	46,188	4.0%	4.4%	78,000	31,812 ▲
Phoenix-Mesa-Chandler, AZ MSA	4.8%	132,960	4.1%	4.3%	146,000	13,040 ▲
Rochester, NY MSA				4.3%	37,000	N/A
Jacksonville, FL MSA	4.0%	36,422	4.3%	4.2%	47,000	10,578 ▲
Louisville/Jefferson County, KY-IN MSA	4.2%	17,102	4.5%	4.2%	42,000	24,898 ▲
Minneapolis-St. Paul-Bloomington, MN-WI MSA	5.7%	130,472	3.6%	4.2%	112,000	-18,472 ▼
Philadelphia-Camden-Wilmington, PA-NJ-DE-MD MSA	4.2%	179,459	3.9%	4.2%	198,000	18,541 ▲
Chicago-Naperville-Elgin, IL-IN-WI MSA	4.3%	288,748	3.8%	4.1%	298,000	9,252 ▲
Baltimore-Columbia-Towson, MD MSA	5.2%	100,032	3.9%	4.1%	89,000	-11,032 ▼
Buffalo-Cheektowaga, NY MSA	3.3%	28,193	3.9%	4.1%	37,000	8,807 ▲
Tulsa, OK MSA				4.1%	30,000	N/A
Richmond, VA MSA	3.4%	28,750	3.5%	4.1%	40,000	11,250 ▲
Virginia Beach-Norfolk-Newport News, VA-NC MSA	3.9%	44,689	4.4%	4.1%	55,000	10,311 ▲
Riverside-San Bernardino-Ontario, CA MSA	4.9%	131,555	4.0%	4.0%	133,000	1,445 ▲
Albany-Schenectady-Troy, NY MSA				4.0%	28,000	N/A
Charlotte-Concord-Gastonia, NC-SC MSA	3.3%	36,464	3.8%	4.0%	74,000	37,536 ▲
Dallas-Fort Worth-Arlington, TX MSA	4.5%	183,718	3.8%	4.0%	211,000	27,282 ▲
Detroit–Warren–Dearborn, MI MSA	3.0%	98,402	3.9%	3.8%	131,000	32,598 ▲
San Jose-Sunnyvale-Santa Clara, CA MSA	5.0%	63,941	3.2%	3.8%	58,000	-5,941 ▼
Kansas City, MO-KS MSA	5.1%	72,080	3.6%	3.8%	60,000	-12,080 ▼
Cleveland-Elyria, OH MSA	4.3%	66,943	3.7%	3.8%	62,000	-4,943 ▼
Oklahoma City, OK MSA	3.3%	28,288	3.5%	3.8%	39,000	10,712 ▲
St. Louis, MO-IL MSA	4.1%	83,769	3.6%	3.7%	79,000	-4,769 ▼
Nashville-Davidson–Murfreesboro–Franklin, TN MSA	3.8%	57,027	3.5%	3.7%	52,000	-5,027 ▼
Cincinnati, OH-KY-IN MSA	3.8%	57,027	3.2%	3.6%	60,000	2,973 ▲
Houston-The Woodlands-Sugar Land, TX MSA	4.1%	152,288	3.3%	3.5%	169,000	16,712 ▲
Milwaukee-Waukesha, WI MSA	3.7%	40,407	3.5%	3.5%	42,000	1,593 ▲
Omaha-Council Bluffs, NE-IA MSA				3.4%	23,000	N/A
Raleigh-Cary, NC MSA			3.2%	3.3%	32,000	N/A
Pittsburgh, PA MSA	2.8%	50,994	3.0%	3.3%	63,000	12,006 ▲

== Statistics by year ==
=== 1990s ===
==== 1990 ====
- "Homosexuality/Heterosexuality: Concepts of Sexual Orientation" published findings of 13.95% of males and 4.25% of females having had either "extensive" or "more than incidental" homosexual experience.
- An extensive study on sexuality in general was conducted in the United States. A significant portion of the study was geared towards homosexuality. The results found that 8.6% of women and 10.1% of men had at one point in their life experienced some form of homosexuality. Of this group, 87% of women and 76% of men reported existing same-sex attractions, 41% of women and 52% of men had sex with someone of the same gender, and 16% of women and 27% of men identified as LGBT.
- The American National Health Interview Survey (1990–1992) conducts household interviews of the civilian non-institutionalized population. The results of three of these surveys, done in 1990–91 and based on over 9,000 responses each time, found between 2% and 3% of the people responding said yes to a set of statements which included "You are a man who has had sex with another man at some time since 1977, even one time."

==== 1992 ====
- The National Health and Social Life Survey asked 3,432 respondents whether they had any homosexual experience. The findings were 1.3% for women within the past year, and 4.1% since 18 years; for men, 2.7% within the past year, and 4.9% since 18 years.

==== 1993 ====
- The Alan Guttmacher Institute survey of sexually active men aged 20–39 found that 2.3% had experienced same-sex sexual activity in the last ten years, and 1.1% reported exclusive homosexual contact during that time.
- Researchers Samuel and Cynthia Janus surveyed American adults aged 18 and over by distributing 4,550 questionnaires; 3,260 were returned and 2,765 were usable. The results of the cross-sectional (not random) nationwide survey stated 9% of men and 5% of women reported having had homosexual experiences "frequently" or "ongoing". In another measure, 4% of men and 2% of women self-identified as homosexual.

==== 1994 ====
- Laumann et al. analyzed the National Health and Social Life Survey of 1992 which had surveyed 3,432 men and women in the United States between the ages of 18 and 59 and reported that the incidence rate of homosexual desire was 7.7% for men and 7.5% for women.

==== 1998 ====
- A random survey of 1672 males (number used for analysis) aged 15 to 19. Subjects were asked a number of questions, including questions relating to same-sex activity. This was done using two methods—a pencil and paper method, and via computer, supplemented by a verbal rendition of the questionnaire heard through headphones—which obtained vastly different results. There was a 400% increase in males reporting same-sex sexual activity when the computer-audio system was used: from a 1.5% to 5.5% positive response rate; the homosexual behavior with the greatest reporting difference (800%, adjusted) was to the question "Ever had receptive anal sex with another male": 0.1% to 0.8%.

=== 2000s ===
==== 2000 ====
- During the 2000 US presidential election campaign, market research firm Harris Interactive studied the prevalence of a gay, lesbian, bisexual or transgender identity employing three distinct methods. In phone interviews, 2% of the population self-identified as LGBT. Using in-person surveys with a blind envelope, that grew to 4%, and using online polls 6%. The group concluded that the difference between methods was due to the greater level of anonymity and privacy to online surveys, which provides more comfort to respondents to share their experiences.

==== 2003 ====
- Smith's 2003 analysis of National Opinion Research Center data states that 4.9% of sexually active American males have had a male sexual partner since age 18, but that "since age 18 less than 1% are [exclusively] gay and 4+% bisexual". In the top twelve urban areas however, the rates are double the national average. Smith adds, "It is generally believed that including adolescent behavior would further increase these rates." The NORC data has been criticised because the original design sampling techniques were not followed, and depended upon direct self-report regarding masturbation and same sex behaviors. (For example, the original data in the early 1990s reported that approximately 40% of adult males had never masturbated—a finding inconsistent with some other studies.)
- In a telephone survey of 4,193 male residents of New York City, 91.3% of men identified as straight, 3.7% as gay, and 1.2% as bisexual. 1.7% said they were in doubt or were not sure and 2.1% declined to answer. 12.4% of men who responded to the sexual orientation question reported sex exclusively with men in the 12 months prior to the survey. Most of them (approximately 70%) identified as heterosexual.

==== 2005 ====
- The American Community Survey from the U.S. Census estimated 776,943 same-sex couples in the country as a whole, representing about 0.5% of the population.

==== 2006 ====
- Fried's 2008 analysis of General Social Survey data shows the percentage of United States males reporting homosexual activity for three time periods: 1988–1992, 1993–1998, and 2000–2006. These results are broken out by political party self-identification, and indicate increasing percentages, particularly among Democrats (perhaps reflecting, in the authors' view, either a shift of political allegiance among gay Americans, or increasing likelihood of acknowledging a homosexual orientation).

==== 2007 ====
- Cornell University, carrying out research into sexuality amongst a representative sample of more than 20,000 young Americans, published that 14.4% of young women were not strictly heterosexual in behavior, a group that included lesbian and bisexual women; 5.6% of young men self-identified as being gay or bisexual.

==== 2008 ====
- National Election Pool's exit polling showed self-identified gay, lesbian, and bisexual voters at 4% of the voting population in the 2008 United States presidential election.

=== 2010s ===
==== 2010 ====
- The National Health and Nutrition Examination Surveys (2000–2010) interviewed a nationally representative sample of 11,744 adults aged 20 to 59 between 2003 and 2010. The survey found that 180 (1.5%) self-reported a homosexual orientation and 273 (2.3%) a bisexual one.
- The National Survey of Sexual Health and Behavior surveyed nearly 6,000 people nationwide between the ages of 14 and 94 through an online methodology and found that 7% of women and 8% of men identify as gay, lesbian, or bisexual.
- Using a phone methodology, the National Intimate Partner and Sexual Violence Survey found, in a sample of about 10,000 women and 8,000 men, that 1.3% of women and 2% of men identify as gay or lesbian, and 1.2% of men and 2.2% of women identify as bisexual.
- In 2010, in the U.S. Census Bureau did not ask singles about sexual orientation in the United States Census.

==== 2011 ====
- A 2011 UCLA School of Law Williams Institute survey found that 3.5% of Americans, estimated, identified themselves as lesbian, gay, or bisexual. The same survey found that an estimated .3% of adult Americans identified themselves as transgender.

==== 2012 ====
- A Gallup report published in October 2012 by the Williams Institute reported that 3.4% of US adults identify as lesbian, gay, bisexual or transgender. Minorities were more likely to identify as non-heterosexual; 4.6% of blacks, 4.0% of Hispanics and 3.2% of whites. Younger people, aged 18–29, were three times more likely to identify as LGBTQ than seniors over the age of 65, the numbers being 6.4% and 1.9%, respectively.
- The National Election Pool found that, among voters on Election Day, 5% identify as gay, lesbian, or bisexual.

==== 2013 ====
- In the first large-scale government survey measuring Americans' sexual orientation, the NHIS reported in July 2014 that 1.6% of Americans identify as gay or lesbian, and 0.7% identify as bisexual. 1.5% of women self-identify as lesbian and 0.9% consider themselves bisexual, while 1.8% of men consider themselves gay and 0.4% identify as bisexual.
- The National Survey of Family Growth (2002–2013) is a nationally representative, multi-year survey of teenagers and adults aged 15–44. The sexual orientation items are presented only to interviewees over age 18. Results are presented separately for women and men.

Women
	Gay/lesbian	Bisexual	Something else	Heterosexual	Did not report
2002	1.3%	2.8%	3.8%	90.3%	1.8%
2006–2010	1.2%	3.9%	0.4%	93.6%	0.8%
2011–2013	1.3%	5.5%	—	92.3%	0.9%

Men
	Gay/lesbian	Bisexual	Something else	Heterosexual	Did not report
2002	2.3%	1.8%	3.9%	90.2%	1.8%
2006–2010	1.8%	1.2%	0.2%	95.6%	1.2%
2011–2013	1.9%	2.0%	—	95.1%	1.0%

- In an experiment, the National Bureau of Economic Research concluded that the share of the population that is non-heterosexual has been significantly underestimated in surveys using traditional questioning methods, even if anonymous. In this study, it was found that, in all three facets of sexual orientation (identity, attraction, and behavior), the percentage of individuals who recognized themselves as non-heterosexual was larger when the survey method in use was the item randomized response, known to reduce socially desirable responding, in lieu of questions with direct responses. However, because the study was based on online volunteer samples and was therefore not nationally representative, researchers make no suggestion as to the real size of the LGBT population.
- Writing in the opinion section of The New York Times in 2013, Seth Stephens-Davidowitz estimated that roughly 5% of American men are "primarily attracted to men". First, using Facebook data and Gallup poll results, he correlated the percentage of men who are openly gay with their state of birth and residence. Second, he measured what percentage of Google pornographic searches were for gay porn. The first method gave between 1% and 3%. The second showed that roughly 5% of men search for gay porn in every state. The figure was slightly higher in states considered gay-tolerant than in others.

==== 2014 ====
- According to the 2014 General Social Survey behavior study, the percentage of Americans that have had a same-sex sexual partner has steadily increased since the early 1990s. In the 1989–1994 period, 4.53% of men and 3.61% of women self-reported having had sex with a same gender person at some point, which grew to 8.18% of men and 8.74% of women in the 2010–2014 period. The increase was mainly due to those who self-reported sex with both genders; among those who only had sex with the same gender, no clear pattern of increase emerged throughout the periods analyzed.
- In a nationally representative telephone survey of 35,071 Americans, Pew Research found that 1,604, or 4.6%, of the sample identified as gay, lesbian or bisexual, and 32,439 (or 92.4%) as heterosexual, with the remainder refusing, being unable to provide an answer, or identifying as something else.

==== 2015 ====
- In a nationally representative survey of 2,021 Americans carried out by Indiana University, it was found that 89.8% of men and 92.2% of women identify as heterosexual, 1.9% of men and 3.6% of women as bisexual, 5.8% of men and 1.5% of women as gay or lesbian, 0.5% of men and 1.3% of women as asexual, and 0.7% of men and 0.9% of women as other.
- The Public Religion Research Institute (PRRI) survey of 2,314 millennials found that 88% identified as heterosexual, 4% as bisexual, 2% as gay, and 1% as lesbian. In a separate question, 1% identified as transgender. In total, 7% of millennials identified as LGBT. Three percent refused to identify their sexual orientation. The unaffiliated were more likely to identify as LGBT than the religious, as were Democratic-leaning millennials compared to the Republican-leaning. No differences were found along racial lines.
- In a YouGov survey of 1,000 adults, 2% of the sample identified as gay male, 2% as gay female, 4% as bisexual (of either sex), and 89% as heterosexual.
- General Social Survey identity polling (2008–2016):

	Gay/lesbian	Bisexual	Total
2008	5.6%	1.1%	6.7%
2010	4.2%	1.4%	5.6%
2012	3.5%	1.2%	4.7%
2014	3.7%	2.6%	6.3%
2016	2.4%	3.0%	5.4%

==== 2016 ====
- In National Election Pool's exit poll of over 24,500 Election Day voters, 5% identified as LGBT.
- Gallup's daily tracking phone survey found that the proportion of Americans who identified as LGBT in 2016 was 4.1% – which represents growth over the 3.6% registered when the question started being asked in 2012. Growth was highest among women, millennials, the non-religious, Hispanics, and Asians, and happened across income and educational categories. Among the religious, and generations older than millennials, the share of those self-identifying as LGBT remained stable or varied negatively.
- A female-only survey found that 7% of American women identify as gay or bisexual.
- According to a national survey organized by the Gay & Lesbian Alliance Against Defamation and Harris Poll, 12% of the US adult population is either a sexual minority (i.e., gay, lesbian, bisexual, asexual or pansexual) or identifies as something other than cisgender. This proportion was highest among millennials (20%) and decreased with age, reaching 5% among those who were aged 72 or more.
- The Public Religion Research Institute (PRRI) conducted a survey of over 100,000 U.S. residents from January 2016 to January 2017 asking, among a variety of attitude and demographic questions, whether or not they consider themselves LGBT. 4.4% of respondents answered affirmatively to that question, and 90.4% responded negatively. The remaining 5.3% did not know or refused to answer.

==== 2017 ====
- In a nationally representative survey organized by Kantar TNS, 87% of American men aged 18 to 30 years identified as heterosexual, 7% as homosexual, 4% as bisexual, and 1% as other.

==== 2019 ====
- The 2019 American Values Atlas by the Public Religion Research Institute found that of all Americans that identify as LGBT, 51% were White Americans while 21% were Hispanic Americans and 13% were African Americans. The same study found that 23% of LGBT Americans identify as Protestant while 13% identify as Catholic.

=== 2020s ===
==== 2020 ====
- In the 2020 United States Census, there were more reported same-sex married couples than unmarried ones as there were 668,497 married same-sex couples and 500,073 unmarried same-sex couples.

==== 2021 ====
- A February 2021 Gallup poll reported that 5.6% of US adults identify as lesbian, gay, bisexual, or transgender. 86.7% said that they were heterosexual or straight, and 7.6% refused to answer. More than half of all LGBT adults identify as bisexual (54.6%), while around a quarter (24.5%) identify as gay, 11.7% as lesbian, and 11.3% as transgender. Additionally, 3.3% of respondents chose another term to describe their orientation (e.g., queer). As a percentage of all US adults, 3.1% identify as bisexual, 1.4% as gay, 0.7% as lesbian, and 0.6% as transgender.
- According to a 2021 report from the Human Rights Campaign, "at least 20 million adults in the United States could be lesbian, gay, bisexual or transgender people." and "Millions more could be another identity that is more expansive than these four terms." Others have estimated that there may be up to 30 million Americans who identify as lesbian, gay, bisexual, or transgender. A study found that 16 to 20 percent of Americans have experienced same sex attraction, and some scholars have claimed that the population of Americans who have experienced same sex attraction reached fifty million.
- In 2021, 8% of respondents to the United States Census Bureau's Household Pulse Survey identified as LGBTQ, with an additional 2% of respondents having identified as neither gay, lesbian, bisexual, or straight. The Household Pulse Survey also indicated that more than 1% of adults in the United States could identify as transgender, with an additional 2% of respondents having identified as neither cisgender or transgender. This was the first time the U.S. Census Bureau asked about sexual identity and gender identity in a survey.
- A 2021 global pride survey by Ipsos, a multinational market research company, found that the percentage of those who identify as transgender, nonbinary, nonconforming, genderfluid, or as something other than male or female, was statistically significantly higher in the Generation Z (those born since 1997) population, at 4%, compared to the 1% of all other adults. The statistic is estimated to be the same in the United States as it is globally. The Census Bureau found that there were 1.2 million same sex couple households in the United States.

==== 2022 ====
- In February 2022, a Gallup poll reported that 7.1% of US adults identify as lesbian, gay, bisexual, or transgender. 34.6% of LGBT respondents were lesbian or gay, 56.8% were bisexual, 10.0% were transgender, and 4.3% identified as something else. LGBTQ+ identity was significantly higher among younger generations (20.8% of Generation Z and 10.5% of Millennials) than older generations (4.2% of Generation X, 2.6% of Baby Boomers, and 0.8% of those born before 1946).
- In June 2022, Pew Research published a survey finding that 1.6% of U.S. adults are transgender or nonbinary, and approximately 5% of young adults in the U.S. say their gender is different from their sex assigned at birth.
- In June 2022, the Williams Institute published a report with the following findings:
  - Over 1.6 million adults (ages 18 and older) and youth (ages 13 to 17) identify as transgender in the United States, or 0.6% of those ages 13 and older.
  - Among U.S. adults, 0.5% (about 1.3 million adults) identify as transgender. Among youth ages 13 to 17 in the U.S., 1.4% (about 300,000 youth) identify as transgender.
  - Of the 1.3 million adults who identify as transgender, 38.5% (515,200) are transgender women, 35.9% (480,000) are transgender men, and 25.6% (341,800) reported they are gender nonconforming.

==== Married same-sex couple households ====
According to Williams Institute, in the United States there were about 1,168,566 married same-sex couple households, as of 2025.

==== 2023 ====
- A February 2023 Gallup poll reported that 7.2% of US adults identify as LGBT, 86% identified as straight or heterosexual, while 7% chose not to answer. 13.4% of LGBT respondents were lesbian, 20.2% gay, 58.2% bisexual, 8.8% transgender, and 6% as another LGBT identity (e.g., pansexual). LGBT identification was higher in younger generations (19.7% of Gen Z and 11.2% of Millennials) than in older generations (3.3% of Generation X, 2.7% of Baby Boomers, and 1.6% of the Silent Generation).
- In June 2023, UCLA's Williams Institute reported that there were approximately 823,000 same-sex couples in the United States. Also according to the institute, most same-sex couples were female at 53% and males were 47% of same-sex couples.

==== 2024 ====
- A March 2024 Gallup poll reported the following:
  - 7.6% of US adults identify as LGBT, 85.6% identified as straight or heterosexual, while 6.8% chose not to answer. 57.3% of LGBTQ+ adults (4.4% of U.S. adults in total) responded that they were bisexual, 15.1% as lesbian, 18.1% as gay, 11.8% transgender, and 4.2% as another LGBT identity (e.g., pansexual).
  - LGBT identification was higher in younger generations (22.3% of Gen Z and 9.8% of Millennials) than in older generations (4.5% of Generation X, 2.3% of Baby Boomers, and 1.1% of the Silent Generation), with 15% of all Gen Z individuals identifying as bisexual.
  - LGBT identification was higher among women (8.5%) than men (4.7%), with women more likely to identify as bisexual and men equally likely to identify as bisexual or gay. 28.5% of Gen Z women identified as LGBT compared with 10.6% of men, as well as 12.4% of Millennial women and 5.4% of Millennial men. Gen Z women identified most as bisexual at 20.7%, as did 9% of Millennial women, and Gen Z men identified most as bisexual at 6.9%, while roughly equal numbers of Millennial men identified as gay or bisexual.

The poll was unable to gather sufficient data from nonbinary Americans (constituting 1% of American adults) for 2023 alone, but combined data from 2022 and 2023 suggested that about 80% of nonbinary adults identified as LGBTQ+, with one-third identifying as transgender and one-third bisexual.

==== 2025 ====
- A Gallup poll released in February 2025 showed that 9.3% of the US population identified as LGBTQ.
- A survey in August 2025, from the Williams Institute, estimated that 0.8% of U.S. adults identify as transgender. As of 2025, estimates for the total percentage of U.S. adults that are transgender or nonbinary range from 0.8% to 1.1%.

==== 2026 ====
- A report released by the Human Rights Campaign Foundation in August 2026 estimated that 12% of U.S. adults identify as LGBTQ. The data for the report drew from responses to the Household Pulse Survey of the U.S. Census between 2021 and 2024.
