= 11 West 11th Street =

House in Manhattan, New York

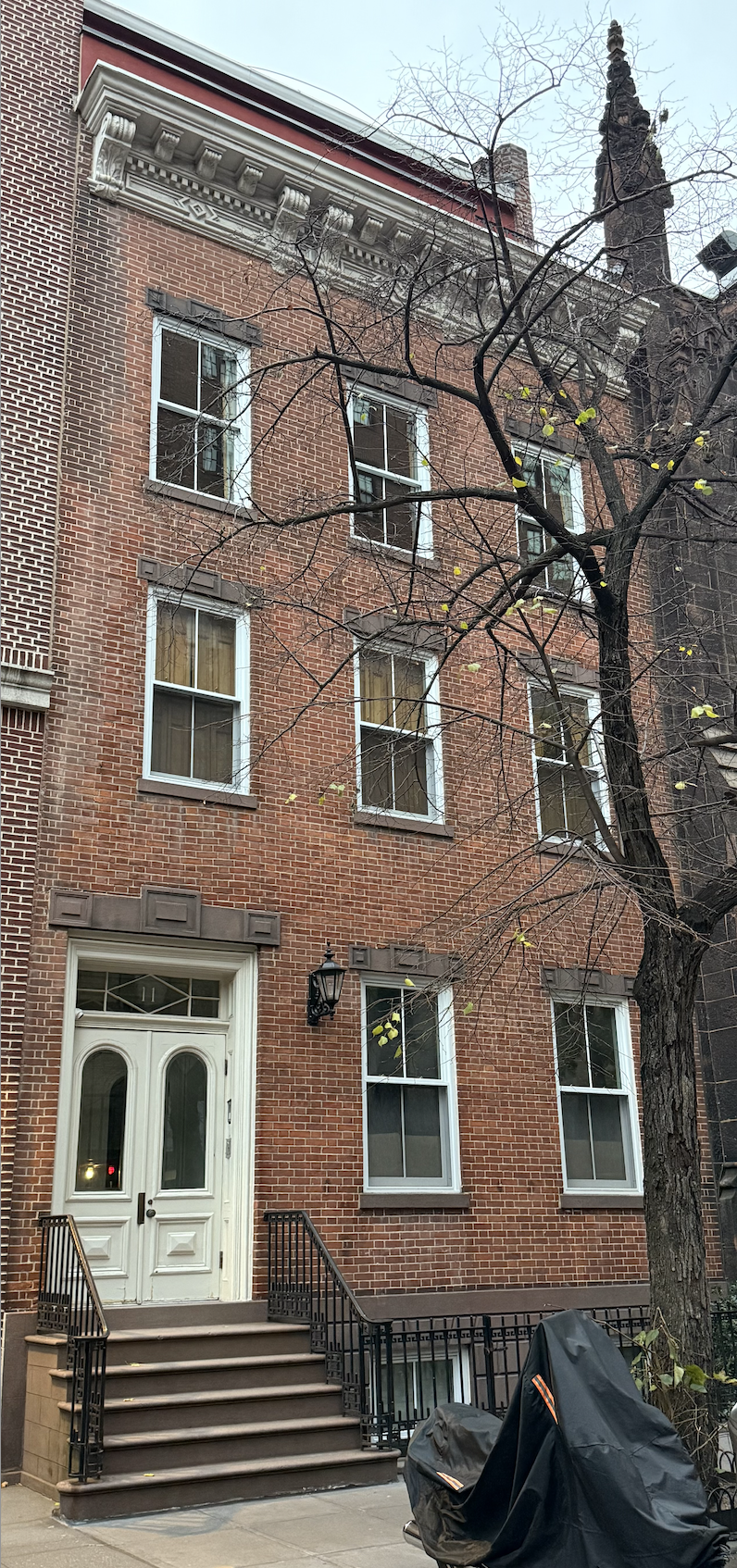

General information
- Type: Residential
- Architectural style: Federal
- Location: Manhattan, New York, U.S.
- Coordinates: 40°44′03.9″N 73°59′44.0″W
- Year built: 1831

Design and construction
- Developer: Charles M. Graham

11 West 11th Street is a townhouse in the Greenwich Village of Manhattan in New York City. The house sits on the north side of West 11th Street and adjacent to the First Presbyterian Church on Fifth Avenue. The home was built in 1831 by Charles M. Graham in the Federal style. Over the last two centuries, the townhouse has undergone various expansions and uses, including its use as a hotel, as residences, and as a nursery school.

== Site ==
11 West 11th Street is on the northern side of West 11th Street, in between Fifth Avenue and Sixth Avenue (Avenue of the Americas) in the Greenwich Village neighborhood of New York City. The site covers a rectangular land lot sized at 2,152 square feet (199.9 m^{2}), with a frontage of 25 feet (7.6 m), and a depth of 86.1 feet (26.2 m). Adjacent to the site on its eastern side sits the First Presbyterian Church of Manhattan.

The building's land use is categorized as a Multi-Family Walk-Up building. As of 2025, there are 4 floors and 5,000 square feet of Gross Floor Area. The building is classed as a Cooperative, with four total residential units. It is part of New York City's 2nd City Council district, as well as Manhattan's 2nd Community District.

The townhouse is designated under the Greenwich Village Historic District, an area of historic landmarks protected by the New York City Landmarks Preservation Commission. Directly across the street from 11 West 11th sits The Church House of the First Presbyterian Church. It was built in 1958 to house the church activities of the congregation. Other nearby structures include 18 W 11th Street, which sits across the street, and was the site of the Greenwich Village townhouse explosion in the 1970s, and the Episcopal Church of the Ascension at 36 Fifth Ave, one block south.

== Architecture ==
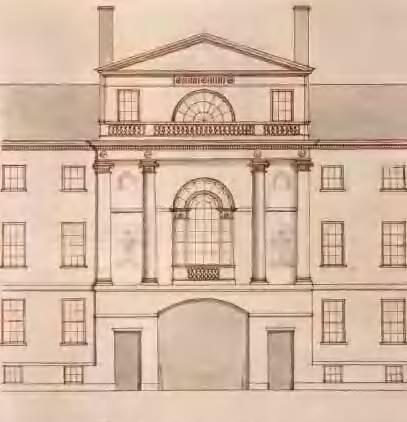
Federal architecture, the style used in constructing the townhouse at 11 West 11th Street in 1831.

11 West 11th Street was built in 1831 in the late Federal style. The townhouse was built with brick in Flemish bond. It was originally built two stories high, with dormers on the roof and a rusticated basement. The townhouse has since been expanded and is now four stories high. Two more floors were added in running bond, the highest of which is a fourth-floor penthouse, set back with a roof deck in front, which was added in the Twentieth Century. In the expansion, care was taken to match the original architecture, as the townhouse sits in a neighborhood noted for the architectural style of its houses. The added brickwork was chosen to match the paneled window lintels. The original muntined window sash was replaced by plate glass.

Other notable changes have been made surrounding the front door and windows on the facade. Federal lintels were installed, complete with paneled end and center blocks. The Greenwich Village Historic District Designation Report describes the evolution of the architecture of the townhouse in this way:

The original Federal eight-paneled door, flanked by leaded side lights and transom (see No. 262 West Eleventh Street), was replaced by double Italianate doors with round-arched panels. The elaborate roof cornice, carried on paired console brackets, was undoubtedly added at about the time that the front door was changed.

== History ==
=== 19th century ===
Charles M. Graham was a physician in the city of New York who owned property and land on the north side of West 11th Street. First, he had the townhouse at 11 West 11th Street built. Later, in 1834, he built a row of ten houses to the west along West 11th Street's north side, numbers 13 to 31. Graham took residence in 11 West 11th in the mid-Nineteenth Century and made it his home.

==== Hotel years ====
How to See New York and Its Environs, 1776-1876: A Complete Guide and Hand-book of Useful Information, Collected from the Latest Reliable Sources

Several decades after the townhouse’s construction, its occupancy changed use into a hotel. On December 24, 1874, The New York Times reported that an art exhibition would be taking place at "Hotel Del Recreo, No. 11 West 11th st, New-York City." The paper wrote the magnificent collection included original works from celebrated artists like Rembrandt, Diego Velázquez, Juan de Espinosa, and Jusepe de Ribera, mentioning that admission free of charge.

In 1875, Robert Macoy's book How to See New York and Its Environs, 1776-1876: A Complete Guide and Hand-book of Useful Information, Collected from the Latest Reliable Sources, listed Hotel Recreo under the European Plan of the Principle Hotels section, at the address "11 West 11th St." Hotels on the European plan charged guests for rooms and meals separately. Several years later, the New York City directory from 1879-1880, published by The Trow City Directory Company listed St. Andrew Hotel at 11 W. 11th.

By the end of the 19th century, the townhouse became a multi-family residence. On January 8, 1896, The New York Tribune wrote under the "Incidents in Society" section, "Mrs. R. Burnham Moffat, gave a reception yesterday afternoon at her home, No. 11 West Eleventh St. Mrs. Moffat, who was Miss Pierrepont, of Brooklyn, was assisted in receiving by Mrs. George B. Moffat, Miss Julia Pierrepont, Mrs. A. A. Low and Miss Anna J. Pierrepont."

=== 20th century ===
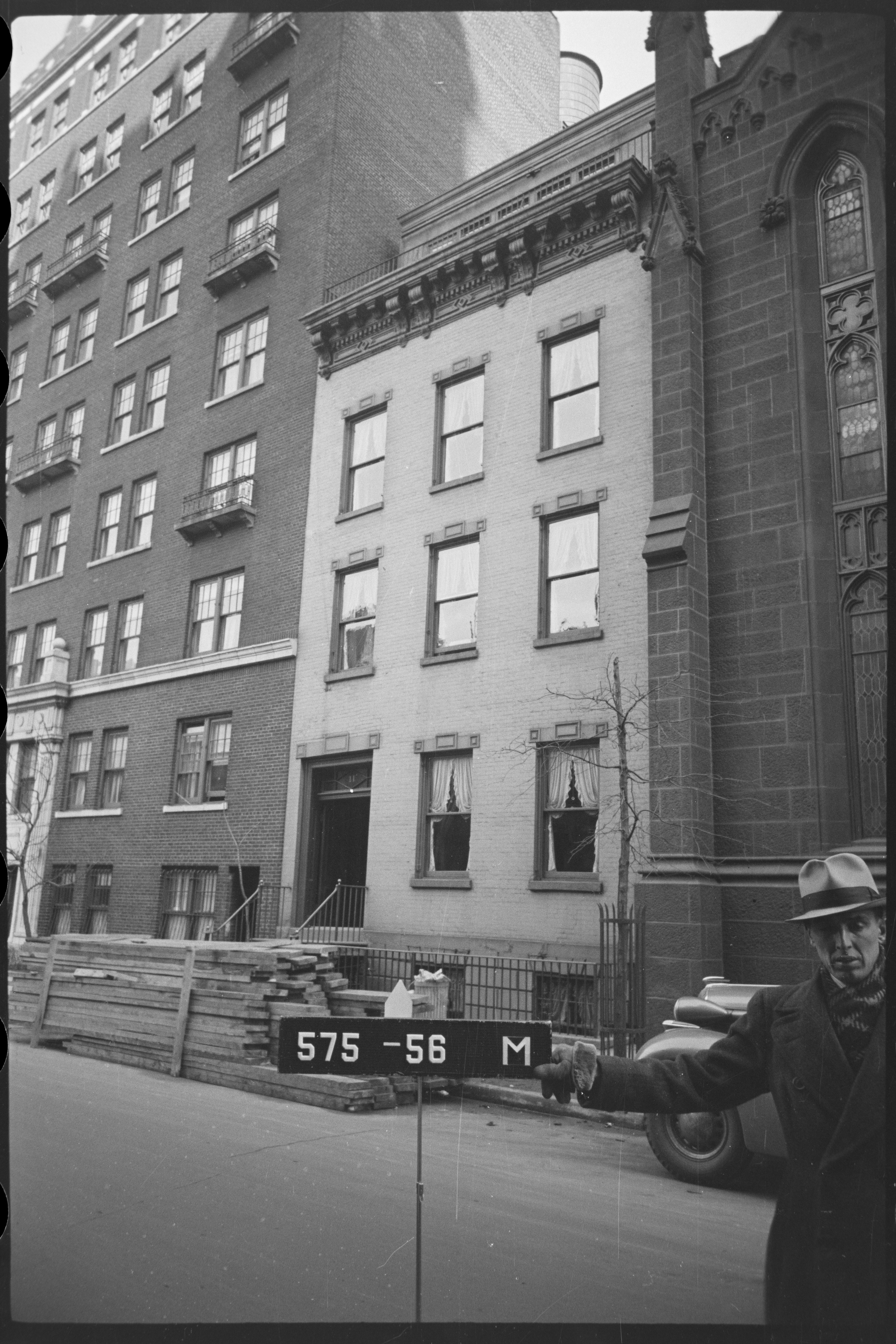
11 West 11th Street, photo taken circa 1940 (as part of the 1940s Tax Department photographs)

==== Tax Department photographs (1940) ====
The townhouse was documented in New York City's collection of Tax Department photographs from the 1940s. In collaboration with the Works Progress Administration (WPA), professional photographers with the New York City Tax Department gathered a collection of photographs of real estate parcels across the city's five boroughs from 1939-1951, with the majority being taken from 1939-1941. These photographs were used to document the location, condition, and appearance of buildings in the city, and to establish a property card system for assessing property for tax purposes.

==== Nursery School (1956–1969) ====
Evidence from the NYC Department of Buildings shows that a nursery school occupied the basement level from 1956 until 1969. On November 7, 1956, the Department of Housing and Buildings produced a Certificate of Occupancy that reported that the cellar had added a "pre-kindergarten nursery school (day care)". The certificate also showed there were 12 persons being accommodated in this nursery school, six male and six female. The Villager reported on February 18, 1960, that Sunday School would be meeting at "Marimur Nursery School, at 11 W. 11th St". Another Certificate of Occupancy from June 6, 1968 showed the nursery school to be operating in the basement of 11 West 11th Street.

However, on November 5, 1969, another Certificate of Occupancy showed the nursery school was no longer within the building. The Villager wrote again of the Nursery School on February 16, 1984 in its Way Back When section titled "Fifteen Years Ago". The paper reported that the "Little Village nursery school at 11 W. 11th St. sought new quarters as a result of the building's new owners' plans for other uses of their space...". Two months after the nursery school vacated the cellar space at 11 West 11th Street, on April 30, 1969, the townhouse was designated as part of the Greenwich Village Historic District.

==== Townhouse explosion (1970) ====
On the morning of March 6, 1970, the four-story brick townhouse across the street at 18 West 11th Street exploded and caught fire due to bombs and dynamite which had been stored in the basement. After finding dynamite in the house, the police ordered the evacuation of several townhouses along the north and south sides of the block. They also asked residents in homes across the street to move into rear rooms away from the windows. The residents of 11 West 11th Street also felt the physical effects of the townhouse bombing, as The New York Times reported that the first blast was "powerful enough to tear a hole in the front wall of the building" and saying the explosion also "shattered window panes throughout the immediate neighborhood, including some as high as the sixth floor of an apartment building directly across the street".

=== 21st century ===
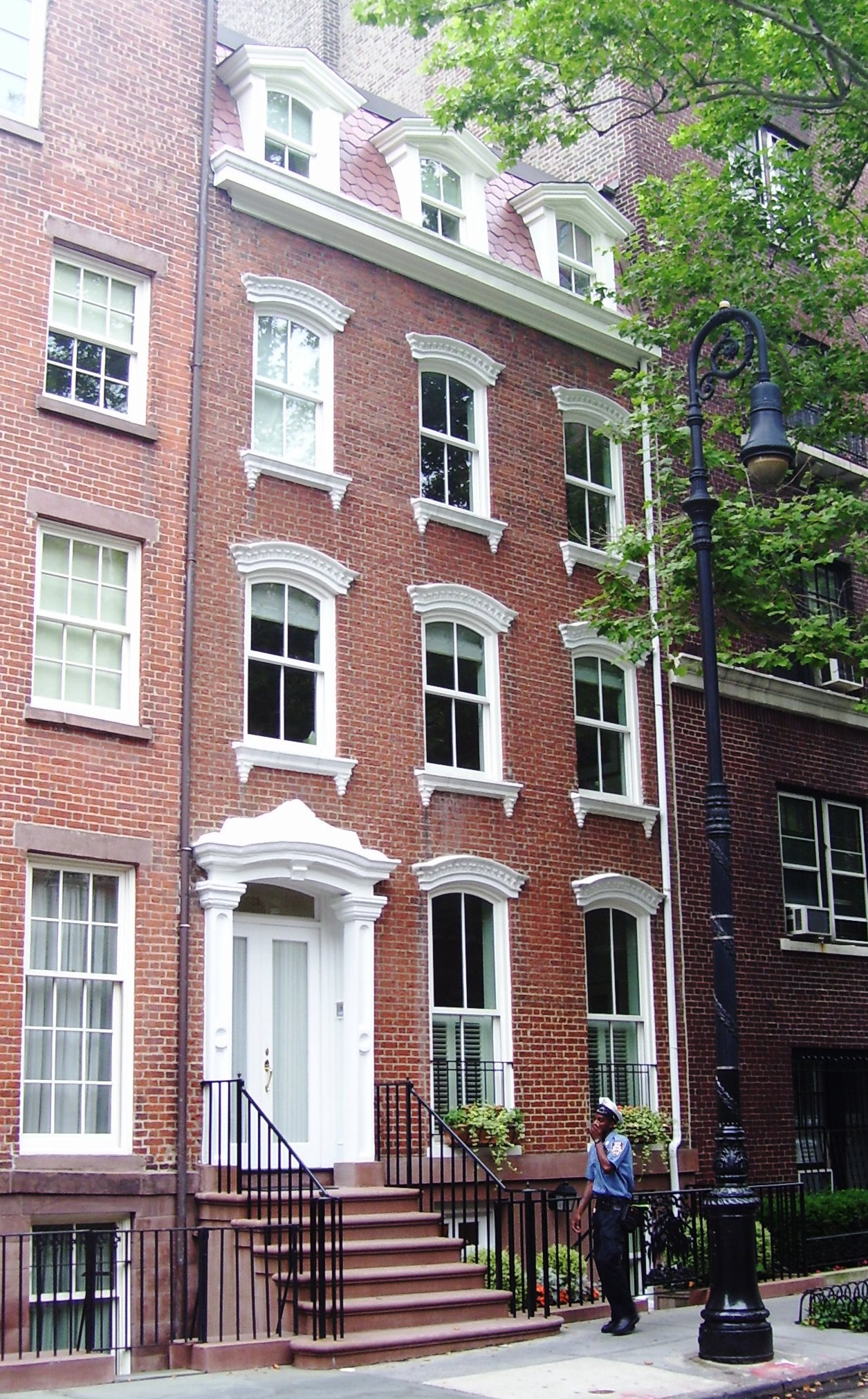
21 West 11th Street. One of Charles M. Graham's row of houses built in 1834, which still stands today.

As of November 2025, 11 West 11th Street still stands. This block of West 11th Street has received attention for expensive sales to known celebrities. In 2023, Robb Report reported that a West 11th Street, 8,000 square foot townhouse had sold for $26.75 million. Another five-unit, four-story home similar to the townhouse at 11 West 11th sold for $15.9 million. The magazine said the street had cemented itself as a place for "supremely wealthy homeowners only, with few if any rentals left on that part of West 11th".

Since residents of New York often disagree on where the borders of Greenwich Village and the West Village are, the magazine also declared the block of West 11th Street to be "technically Greenwich Village but spiritually West Village".

== See also ==
- Greenwich Village
- Federal architecture
- Greenwich Village townhouse explosion
