= Lynching of Paulo Boleta =

1916 lynching in New York City, U.S.

- Location: Greenwich Village, Manhattan, New York, U.S.
- Date: December 14, 1916
- Attack type: Lynching
- Deaths: 1
- Perpetrator: Mob
- No. of participants: 500

The lynching of Paulo Boleta took place on December 14, 1916, in the Greenwich Village neighborhood of Manhattan in the U.S. state of New York. Boleta, a working-class Italian immigrant, was beaten and trampled by a mob of 500 men and boys after randomly firing his revolver on the street. Hospitalized, Boleta died of a fractured skull that same day. Nobody faced criminal charges or convictions for the murder.

== Background ==
Boleta was a working-class Italian immigrant who worked as a shoemaker and lived at 226 West Houston Street in Greenwich Village. Stressing his marginally nonwhite status as an Italian and immigrant, The Morning Telegraph compared Boleta's standing in the community to that of "an ignorant and friendless Negro."

== Shooting and lynching ==
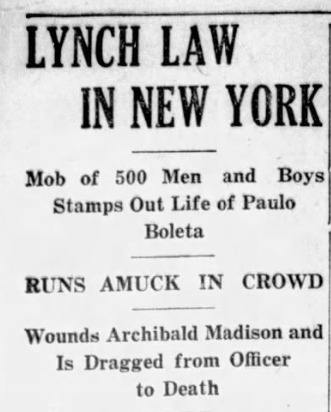
A news article in The Republican of Springfield, Massachusetts, about the lynching of Paulo Boleta, December 14, 1916.

On the morning of December 14, 1916, Boleta left his home, according to his family to purchase a toy piano for his little daughter. While he was walking along a crowded street in Greenwich Village, the Commercial Advertiser reported that "he is believed to have become suddenly insane." Boleta allegedly discharged his revolver at a passing car without warning. He then chased three loungers, shooting Archibald Madison in the wrist. Hundreds of children, women, and men bolted for cover as Boleta fired randomly at bystanders, narrowly missing one or two little girls. When he had emptied his six-chamber revolver, men rushed to tackle him. Patrolman Bradt tried to arrest Boleta while holding back the mob of 500 men and boys, who beat and stomped on the shoemaker before police reserves arrived and dispersed the mob. Boleta died of a fractured skull within a half-hour of arriving at Bellevue Hospital.

"For the first time in fifty-three years," commented a widely printed United Press account, "lynch law held a section of New York in its grip."

== Legacy ==
"Although surviving records are thin," commented one historian, "Boleta's lynching seemingly provoked little controversy." The Chicago Tribune included Boleta on its 1916 list of lynchings, but little subsequent coverage ensued, and even though police searched the neighborhood for the mob's ringleaders, newspapers reported no arrests or convictions, and Boleta's name rarely appears in print after the events of December 1916. This seeming indifference may be attributed to Anglo-American prejudice against Italians, seen as racially inferior like Mexicans and Chinese and hence likelier to be lynched. Boleta's native Italian name may have been "Paolo Boletta," implying that the newspapers could not be bothered to spell the victim's name correctly.

Some secondary sources have inaccurately reported the location of the lynching to be the town of Greenwich in upstate Washington County.

== See also ==
- Lynching of Italian Americans
