= Manhattan Community Board 2 =

Community District in New York, United States

Manhattan Community District 2
- Community District
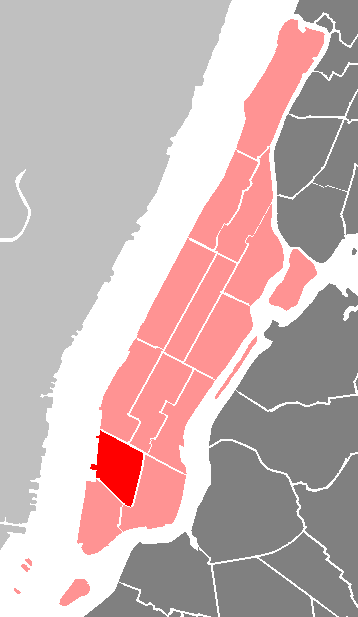
- Country: United States
- State: New York
- City: New York City
- Borough: Manhattan
- Neighborhoods: list: Chinatown; Greenwich Village; Little Italy; NoHo; NoLIta; SoHo; South Village; West Village

Government
  - Chairperson: Susan Kent
  - District Manager: Mark Diller

Area
  - Land: 1.4 sq mi (3.6 km^{2})

Population (2020)
  - Total: 92,445
  - Density: 66,000/sq mi (25,000/km^{2})

Ethnicity
  - Hispanic and Latino Americans: 5.7%
  - African-American: 2.4%
  - White: 74.8%
  - Asian: 14.6%
  - Others: 9.0%
- Time zone: UTC−5 (Eastern)
  - Summer (DST): UTC−4 (EDT)
- Area code: 212, 646, and 332, and 917
- Police Precinct: 1st (website); 5th (website); 6th (website); 9th (website)
- Website: cbmanhattan.cityofnewyork.us/cb2/

The Manhattan Community Board 2 is a New York City community board encompassing the neighborhoods of Greenwich Village, West Village, South Village, NoHo, SoHo, Little Italy, NoLIta, and a portion of Chinatown in the borough of Manhattan. It is bounded by the Bowery, Canal Street, the Hudson River, and 14th Street on the east, south, west, and north, respectively. The district covers three city council districts and four police precincts, and encompasses one of the largest landmark districts in New York City.

Due to overwhelming disgust with the impending overdevelopment of Greenwich Village during the late 1950s and early 1960s, residents organized to fight further destruction of historic buildings and townhouses within the village. These residents made up the first members of what was then called a "Community Planning Board." CB2 was one of the first of these "Community Planning Boards."

Susan Kent currently serves as the board's Chair and Mark Diller as its District Manager. He administers the Board office and is the principal liaison with various City agencies involved in CB2 affairs. He further chairs the monthly District Service Cabinet meeting at which representatives from various City agencies and elected officials address issues of concern within the community. The District Manager additionally oversees the Board's operating budget expenditures and prepares drafts as well as the annual report submitted to the Mayor and the City Council. Mr. Diller reports on all of these matters at the monthly CB#2 Executive Committee meeting.

== Demographics ==
At the 2000 United States Census, the Community Board had a population of 93,119 (down from 94,105 in 1990 but up from 87,069 in 1980). The ethnic breakdown of the area was 69,683 (74.8%) Non-Hispanic White, 2,226 (2.4%) African American, 13,622 (14.6%) Asian American or Pacific Islander, 74 (0.1%) American Indian or Native Alaskan, 324 (0.3%) of some other race, 1,860 (2.0%) of two or more races, 5,290 (5.7%) of Hispanic origins. 10.7% of the population benefited from public assistance in 2010 but, up from 5.2 in 2000.

The land area is 866.4 acres, or 1.4 square miles (3.6 km^{2}).
