= Greenwich Village High School =

Coordinates: 40°43′34″N 74°00′17″W

Information
- School type: Private high school
- Grades: 9-12
- Gender: Mixed

Greenwich Village High School (GVHS) was a planned grade 9-12 independent high school in Manhattan, New York City. The school was to be located at 30 Vandam Street between 6th Avenue and Varick. GVHS was scheduled to open in September 2009.

== History ==
Utilizing the resources of the larger NYC community, an interdisciplinary and relevant curriculum would combine ethical and intellectual training, and give equal weight to the sciences, the humanities, and the arts.

GVHS would be an intentionally diverse community, reflecting the many racial, ethnic, and social groups which make up New York City. The school was planned to open with a ninth grade class of 45-60 students, then build to 90 students per grade level over the following three years for a total of 360 students.

As of July 1, 2008, David Liebmann, an experienced independent school administrator and teacher, was appointed head of school. Prior to GVHS, he worked at Shady Side Academy (PA), The Westminster Schools (GA), and The Chewonki Maine Coast Semester (ME). David Clarke was named academic dean. He served on the faculty at Parker School (HI), Menlo School (CA), and Buckingham Browne & Nichols School (MA) where he was academic dean and college counselor. Tia Biasi served as director of development, having previously worked at Grace Church School (NY). Camilla Campbell was admissions associate and Woody Loverude was admissions assistant.

A founding board of trustees composed of Greenwich Village residents, parents, philanthropists, and other supporters governs the school and provides guidance and support.

As of 2009, the planned opening was put on indefinite hold, as expected private funding failed to materialize.
