= Gay Street (Manhattan) =

Street in Manhattan, New York

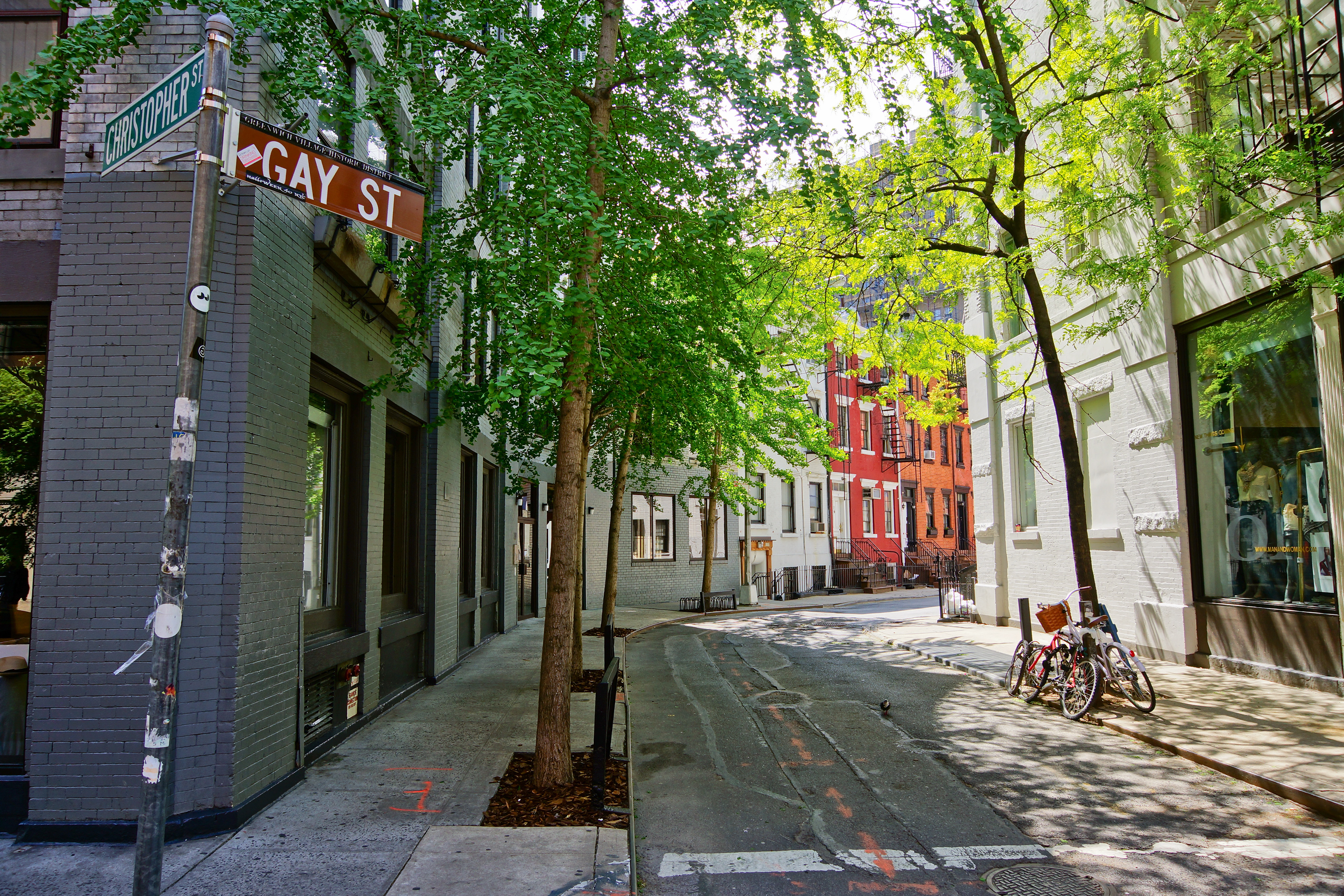
- Gay Street, southward view
- Location: Greenwich Village, Manhattan, New York City
- Postal code: 10014
- Coordinates: 40°44′01″N 74°00′01″W
- North end: Christopher Street
- South end: Waverly Place

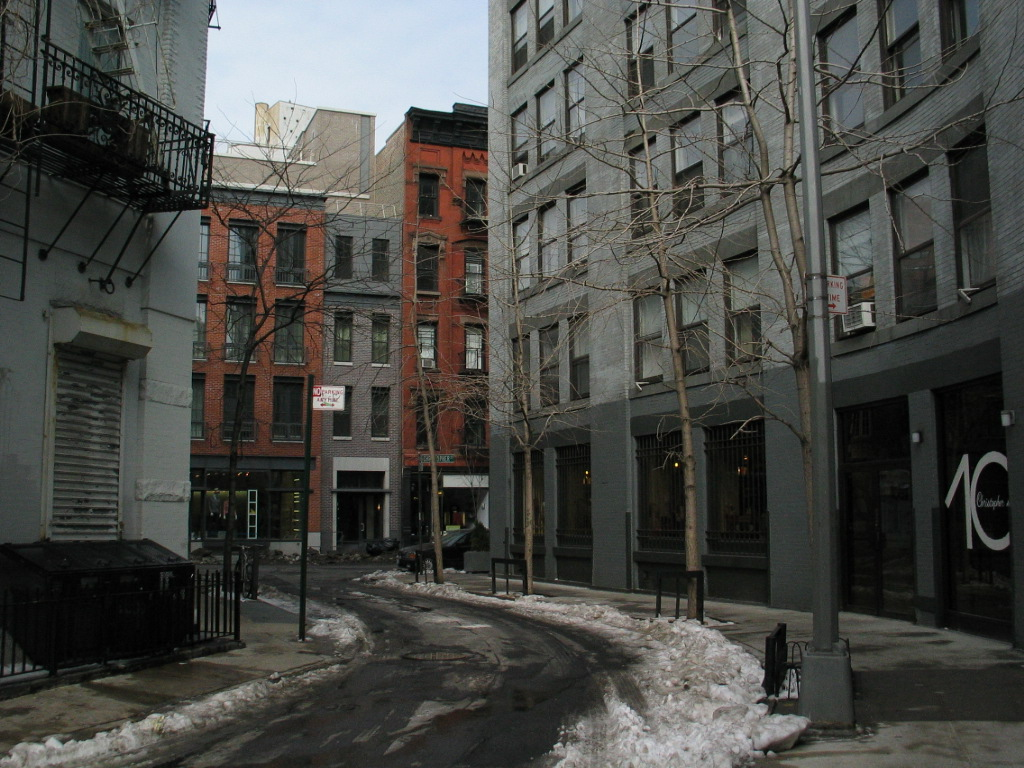
The northward view to Christopher Street

Gay Street is a short, angled street that marks off one block of Greenwich Village in the New York City borough of Manhattan. Although the street is part of the Stonewall National Monument (a U.S. national monument dedicated to the LGBT-rights movement), its name is likely derived from a family named Gay who owned land or lived there in colonial times. A newspaper of May 11, 1775, contains a classified ad where an "R. Gay", living in the Bowery, offers a gelding for sale.

This street, originally a stable alley, was probably named for an early landowner, not for the sexuality of any denizens, who coincidentally reside in Greenwich Village, a predominantly homosexual community. Nor is it likely, as is sometimes claimed, that its namesake was Sidney Howard Gay, editor of the National Anti-Slavery Standard; he would have been 19 when the street was christened in 1833. The mistaken association with an abolitionist is probably because the street's residents were mainly black, many of them servants of the wealthy white families on Washington Square. Later it became noted as an address for black musicians, giving the street a bohemian reputation.

Since it was once too narrow to be a full-fledged street, the City of New York widened it in 1833. As a result, Federal houses of 1826-1833 line the west side of the street, while on the east side, following a hiatus caused by the Panic of 1837, the houses are from 1844 to 1860, with remnants of Greek Revival detailing in doorways and window surrounds.

The street extends from Christopher Street one block south to Waverly Place, between and roughly parallel to Sixth and Seventh Avenues. It runs through the site of a brewery owned by Wouter van Twiller, who succeeded Peter Minuit as Governor of New Netherland in 1633. The name first appeared officially in the Common Council minutes for April 23, 1827, which record a health inspector's complaint against a privy belonging to one A. S. Pell of Gay Street.

The 1942 movie A Night to Remember portrays 13 Gay Street as the address of the building where most of the action, including a murder, occurs. The opening shots of Cyndi Lauper's video for "Girls Just Want to Have Fun" were shot on Gay Street in September 1983. In 1996, Sheryl Crow made a video on Gay Street for the song "A Change Would Do You Good."

As part of the Stonewall 50 – WorldPride NYC 2019 celebration, which marked the 50th anniversary of the Stonewall riots, ten ornamental street signs honoring the LGBT community were installed on Gay Street. The signs, carrying labels such as "Lesbian St" and "Bisexual Street", were arranged in the colors of a pride flag. Several 19th-century houses on the west side of Gay Street were demolished starting in 2022.

== See also ==
- Doyers Street, another historically short and crooked street in Manhattan
