= Main Quad (Stanford University) =

University building

Coordinates: 37°25′39″N 122°10′13″W

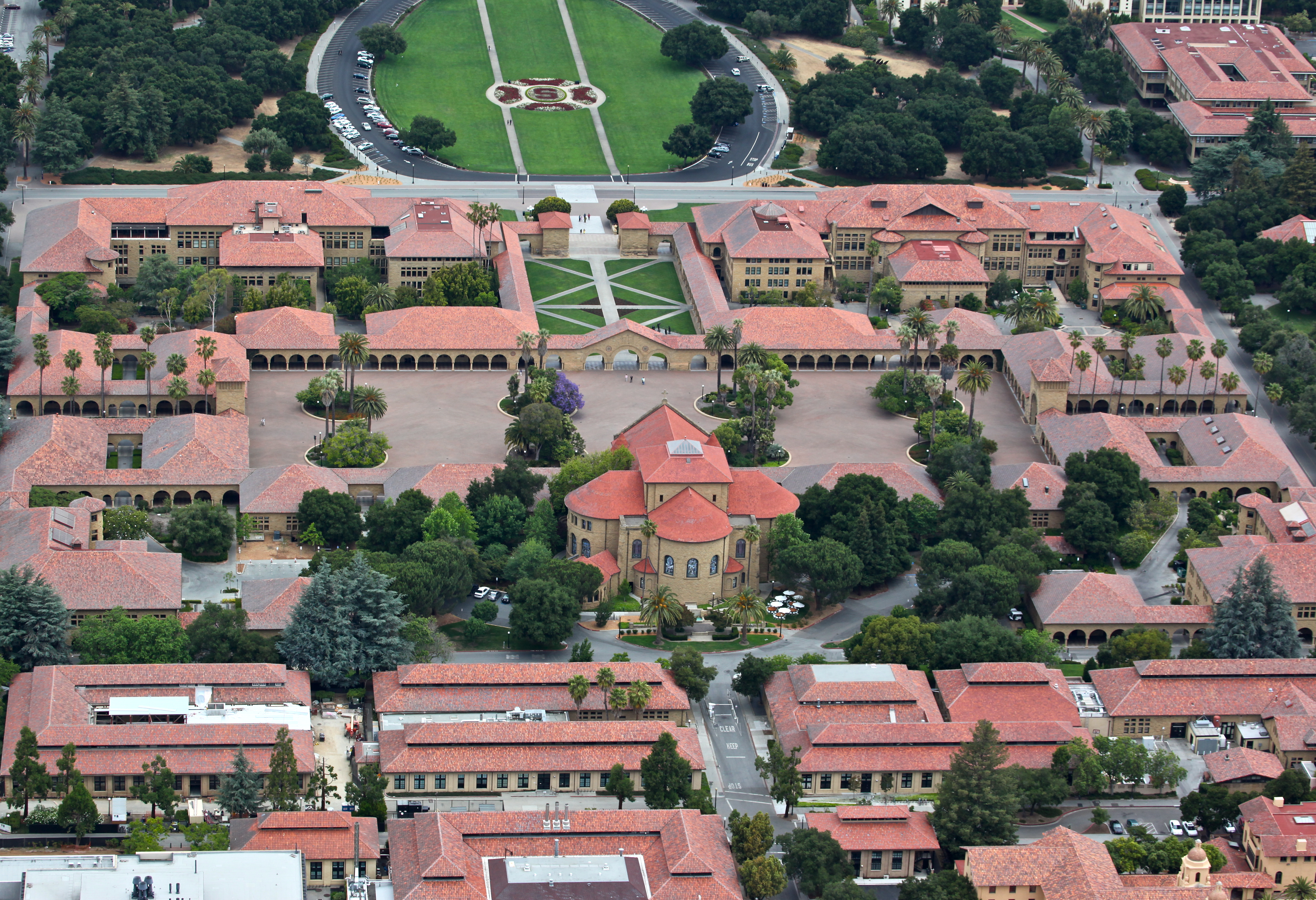
Stanford Main Quad aerial view. The Quad includes Memorial Church in the middle of the picture, beyond it the bricked inner courtyard with its eight planting circles and beyond it the grassy Memorial Court. At the top of the picture is the grassy Oval. The buildings below the church are not part of the Main Quad.

The Main Quadrangle, or more commonly Main Quad or simply Quad, is the heart and oldest part of Stanford University in California. The collection of connected buildings was started in 1887 and completed in 1906. The Quad was damaged in the 1906 San Francisco earthquake, repaired, less severely damaged in the 1989 Loma Prieta earthquake, and repaired again. With the notable loss of the original memorial arch and the church spire in 1906, the Quad exteriors have remained almost the same since the beginning, though the interiors of most of the buildings have changed radically. The Main Quad is still used for its original purposes of teaching, research, and administration.

== Description ==
Layout of the Main Quad: A: Memorial Court B: Inner Quad courtyard C: History Corner courtyard D: Oregon Courtyard E: Geology Corner courtyard F: Math Corner courtyard G: East Gateway H: West Gateway J: Keith Memorial Terrace

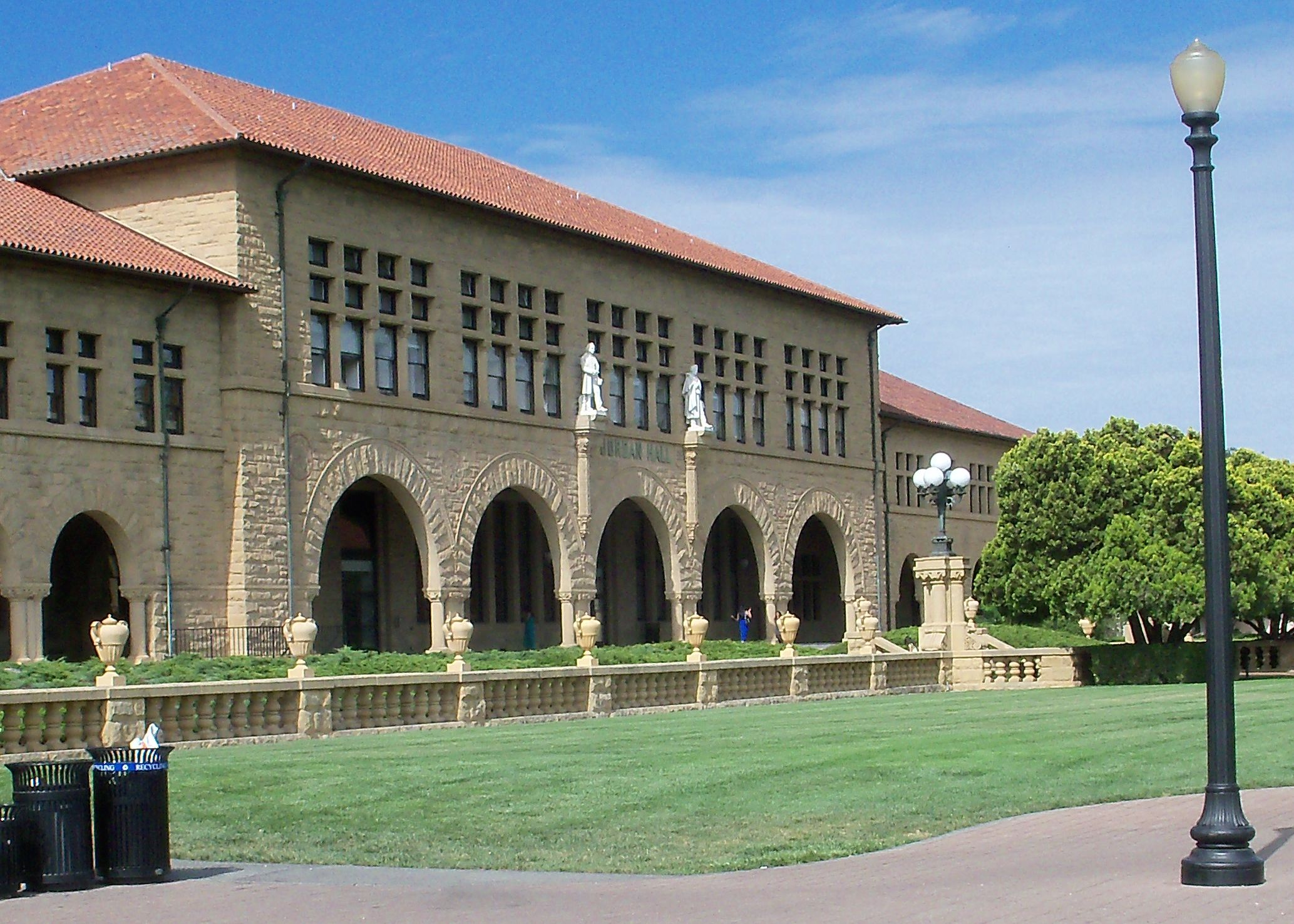
Building 420 (former Jordan Hall. Note the white statues of Agassiz (now gone) and Humboldt on the building above the arches and, in front of the Quad, the sandstone balustrade with its urns.

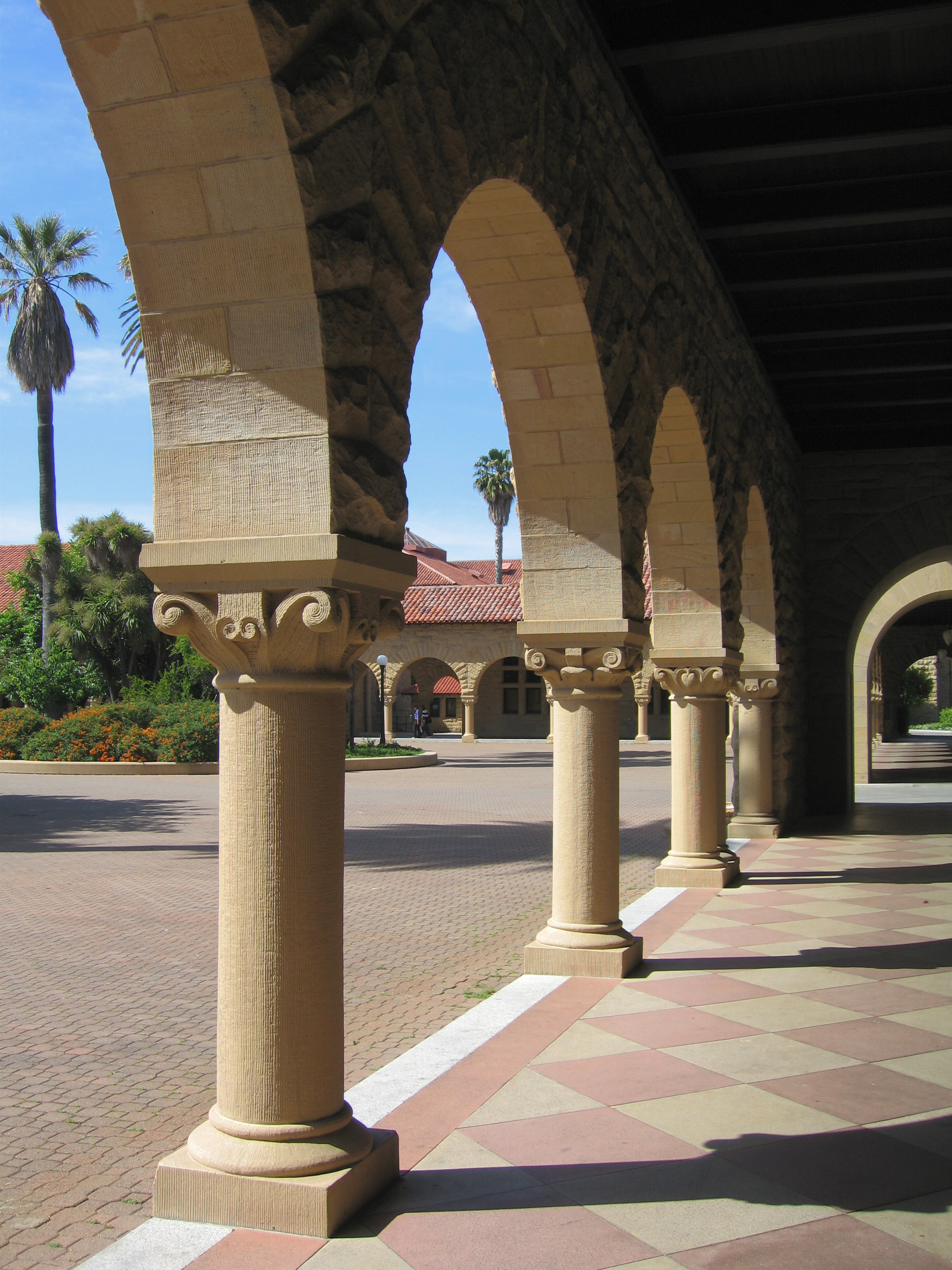
One of the covered open walkways of the inner courtyard. A close look at the capitals of the columns will show that they differ.

The Main Quad is built on a slight slope so that though the back of the structure is level with the ground, the front is elevated. It is oriented slightly east of north along the Memorial Church–Memorial Court–Palm Drive axis. The front approach is at the end of a mile-long road, Palm Drive, which leads from the main entrance onto the university grounds and is lined with Canary Island palm trees. At its southwestern (campus) end, Palm Drive becomes a one-way loop that encircles a large lawn called the Oval. Immediately in front perpendicular to Palm Drive is Jane Stanford Way (once known as Serra Mall), which is restricted to official vehicles and bicycles. Between Jane Stanford Way and the Main Quad are another lawn, some bicycle parking, a long sandstone balustrade originally built in 1902, and steps up to the level of the quad: the main steps to Memorial Court, the east steps to Wallenberg Hall (building 160), and the west steps to building 420.

The Inner Quad consists of a large courtyard surrounded by twelve connected buildings (numbered clockwise, 1 through 110) and Stanford Memorial Church. Around that are 14 additional connected buildings (120 through 460) that make up the Outer Quad. The Outer Quad buildings create several additional courtyards. Memorial Court, the most important, is the front entrance of the structure. Besides the front entrance there are also the east and west entrances with gatehouses over them where they enter the inner courtyard. The four corners of the Outer Quad are named, clockwise from Memorial Court, the History Corner with its courtyard of citrus trees, the Engineering Corner with the Oregon Courtyard of flowering cherry trees, the Geology Corner with a garden designed by Thomas Church, and the Math Corner. Other than Engineering, which now houses the Division of Literatures, Cultures, and Languages (hence is often now referred to as the Language Corner), the respective disciplines are still in their corners. Besides the gardens in the minor courtyards, the main inner courtyard has eight large raised planting circles with a variety of trees and bushes.

The Main Quad also has open covered walkways around the Inner Quad courtyard, Memorial Court, and around the exterior of the entire structure except for the main entrance, the east and west gateways, and part of the back. Each year's graduating class buries a time capsule and marks it with a plaque in the walkway around Inner Quad, starting with the class of 1896 right in front of Memorial Church (the classes of 1892 to 1895 put theirs in later); the plaques now reach more than halfway up the western walkway. Under the west gatehouse is a time capsule and plaque marking the centennial of the opening of the university, and the cornerstone (building 60) also has a time capsule.

=== Points of interest ===
Wallenberg Hall (building 160) on east side of the front (History Corner) is named for the Wallenberg family who gave much of the money for renovating it in 1999. In the early days it housed the university library and was originally built in 1900 with funds from Thomas Welton Stanford, brother of university founder Leland Stanford and uncle of Leland Stanford Junior for whom the university is named. The second story has two white statues of Benjamin Franklin and Johannes Gutenberg. Building 420—the corresponding building on the west side of the quad—was named for David Starr Jordan, the first president of the university. It has statues of Louis Agassiz (statue now removed) and Alexander von Humboldt. The original statues were created by Antonio Frilli, but Franklin and Gutenberg went missing after renovation work in 1949 and were never found; recreations were done by a local sculptor, Oleg Lobykin, and installed in 2013. In October 2020, the university relocated the statue of Agassiz (because of his support of polygenism) and dropped the name Jordan Hall (because of Jordan's promotion of eugenics laws).

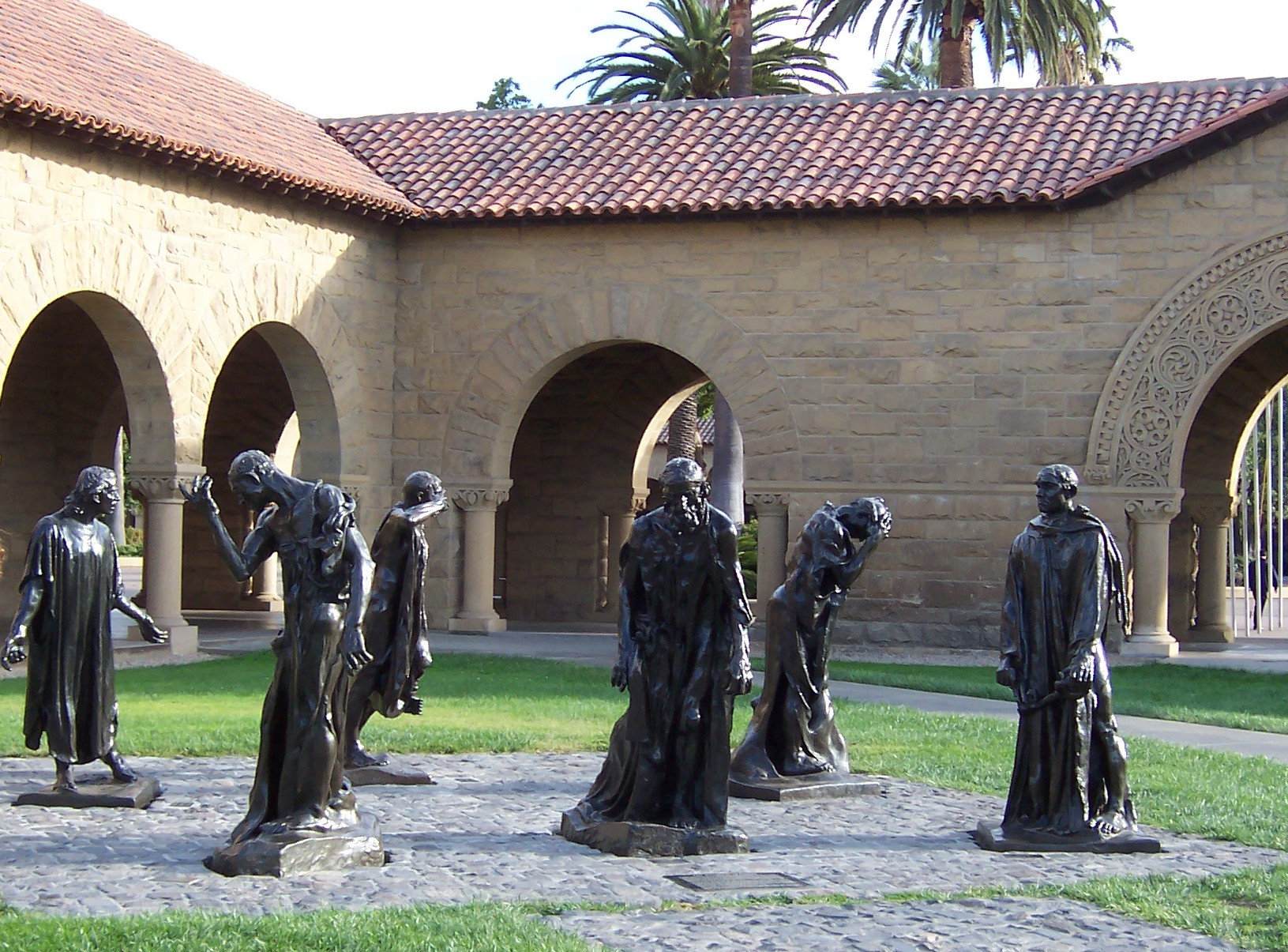
Rodin's Burghers of Calais in Memorial Court

Only a few of the other buildings have names. Building 200 is officially the Lane History Corner, named for Bill and Jean Lane in 1998. At about the same time Building 320 (aka Geology Corner) became Braun Corner after the Braun family and Building 260 (aka Language Corner) became Pigott Hall after the Pigott family; both families have long connections with Stanford University. Building 460 is Margaret Jacks Hall, named in 1980 for the daughter (who died in 1962 and left a bequest to the university) of David Jacks. Building 120 is named McClatchy Hall.

Memorial Court features several sculptures by Auguste Rodin from his grouping The Burghers of Calais.

Adjacent to the Main Quad at the Math Corner is a casting of George Segal's Gay Liberation sculpture. The statue, consisting of four life-sized figures, was commissioned in 1979 (the 10th anniversary of the Stonewall riots) and created in 1980. It was the first piece of public art dedicated to LGBT rights. Two castings were made and originally intended for installation in New York and Los Angeles, but the statue proved too controversial for either city. The second casting was offered to Stanford, which accepted it as a long-term loan and installed it in 1984. The sculpture was vandalized several times over the next 10 years but eventually became an accepted part of the public art at Stanford. New York in 1992 finally installed the first casting in Christopher Park.

Between the church and building 60 is the Amy Blue Garden with benches, a sundial, and a small birdbath dedicated to the memory of Barbara Jordan, daughter of the university's first president who died aged 9 in 1901 of scarlet fever; the garden as a whole is in memory of Amy Blue, a university staffer who died in 1988 at the age of 44. Also in that area is the Frances C. Arrillaga Memorial, named after the wife of John Arrillaga; it has unusual acoustic properties.

Behind the church is the Keith Memorial Terrace with its roses and fountain, designed by Thomas D. Church who created many other public spaces and gardens at Stanford, and dedicated to the memory of Captain Willard W. Keith Jr. (class of 1941), who was killed at Guadalcanal in November 1942.

== History ==
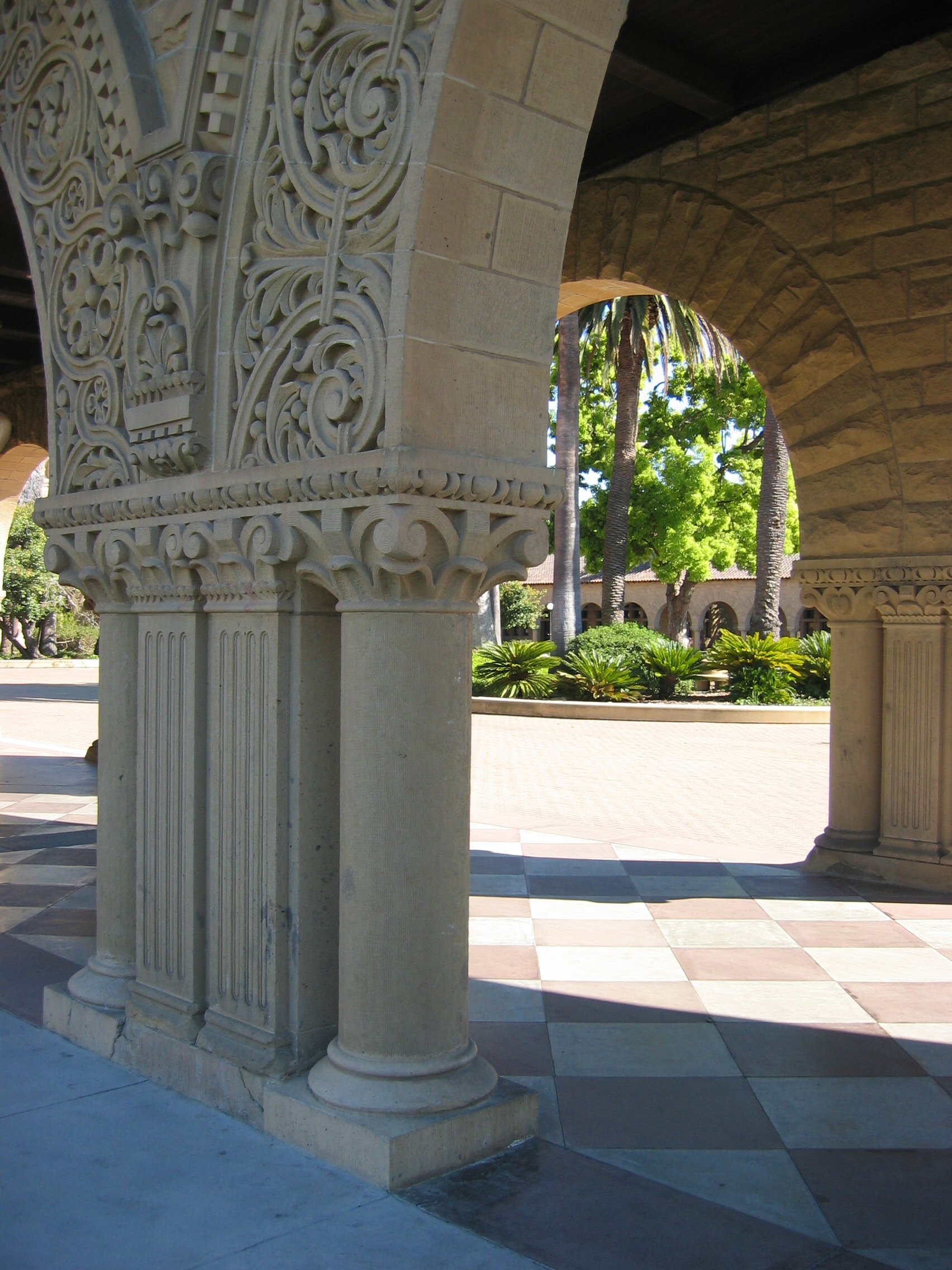
Detail showing the elaborate frieze work in the stone; Inner Quad planting circles in the background

The conception of a quadrangle-centered campus wasn't formalized until 1886, several years after Leland Stanford first broached the idea of a university to the press. In planning the new campus, the Stanfords consulted with Francis Walker, then president of the Massachusetts Institute of Technology, and with Frederick Law Olmsted, a seasoned landscape architect who had planned Central Park and created early master plans for the University of California. The Stanfords invited the two to Palo Alto in August 1886 to survey the location. Olmsted initially proposed to build the campus on the foothills, but in fall of 1886, the Stanfords decided to build on flat farmland in Palo Alto.

In a November 30, 1886 report to Leland Stanford, Walker, and Olmsted recommended a homogeneous campus of quadrangles, proposing that the buildings be mostly one-story structures constructed from "massive rough stone". According to a Gertrude Atherton report in Harper's Weekly, the plan was to mimic adobe, but considerations of climate and durability led the Stanfords to settle on a tan-colored local sandstone.

Olmsted, who created the university's first Master Plan, called for the university to be primarily housed in an inner and outer quadrangle. To design the quadrangle itself, the Stanfords in 1886 hired the firm of "the greatest American architect of his generation," Henry Hobson Richardson. (Richardson himself had died earlier that year, and his three main associates were carrying on his work as the firm Shepley, Rutan and Coolidge.) This group of architects are noted for the Richardsonian Romanesque style, and features of that style including "round low arches, sturdy piers, massive walls, simple silhouettes, and sheltering roofs" are prominent in the Quad. The style was adapted to a California Mission theme. The primary building materials were local yellow sandstone and red tile roofs. The sandstone was quarried at the Graystone Quarry in San Jose, California, and transported to the building site via a private railway spur. Hundreds of laborers received the sandstone, cut it to size, dressed it, and finished it; skilled stonecutters and sculptors, primarily from Italy, installed it and embellished it with friezes. Over the objections of the architects, the Stanfords insisted that the main entrance to the Quad be "a large memorial arch with an enormously large approach". The arch was built and was topped with an elaborate frieze representing "The Progress of Civilization in America"; however, the arch was destroyed in the 1906 San Francisco earthquake and was not rebuilt.

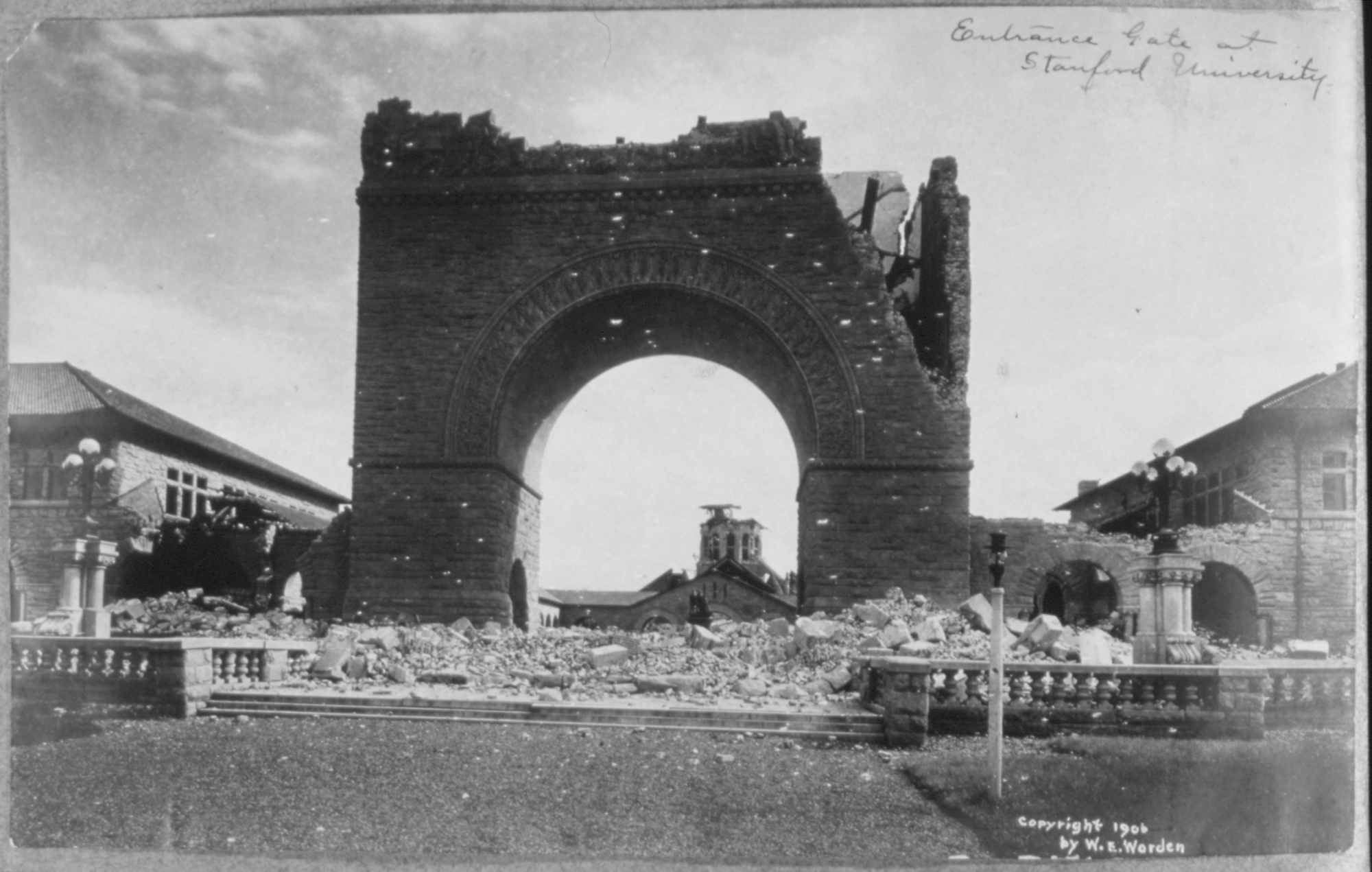
The arch at the entrance to the Main Quad shortly after the 1906 earthquake. It was never rebuilt nor was the steeple on the church in the background.

The cornerstone was laid at what is now Building 60 on May 14, 1887, which would have been Leland Stanford Junior's 19th birthday. The Inner Quad was mostly finished (except for the church) by the time the university opened in 1891. The construction of the church, which had been planned from the early years to create a focal point for Inner Quad, was delayed by legal disputes over the Stanford estate, and so was not completed until early in 1903. A review in the Harper’s Weekly estimated its cost to be somewhere around $600,000, or about $16 million in 2023. Outer Quad was also completed around this time, mostly under Coolidge's direction.

The campus was severely damaged in the 1906 San Francisco earthquake. Restoration of the Quad began immediately, wrapping up in 1909 to a cost of around $700,000, but several original features of the Quad that collapsed in the earthquake were never rebuilt: the huge Memorial Arch over the entrance to Memorial Court, and a spire on Memorial Church. The Quad, which was originally built of unreinforced masonry, has been seismically retrofitted several times since then.

The 1989 Loma Prieta earthquake also damaged some of the Quad buildings. Language Corner and Geology Corner were closed for repairs for more than five years; most of that time was spent negotiating with the Federal Emergency Management Agency over paying for the repairs. Memorial Church was also damaged but was repaired more quickly via private donations.

In 2020, the Stanford Department of Psychology and student-led groups began the process to rename Jordan Hall because of David Starr Jordan's association with the eugenics movement.

Most of the university's other, more recent buildings echo the Quad's basic pattern of buff-colored walls, red roofs, and arcades, giving Stanford's campus its distinctive look. The original university plan was to add additional quadrangles of buildings, initially to the left and right of the Main Quad. However, this part of the plan was put aside for many decades until the Science and Engineering Quad was built to the west, starting in the 1980s and completed in 2013.

== Current use ==
The Main Quad now houses many departments and classrooms and also the offices of the President, Provost, and administrative offices of the School of Humanities and Sciences. The main courtyard is used for University functions, in particular the Baccalaureate service held on the day before the main graduation ceremony, departmental graduation ceremonies, and the annual alumni reunion dinner. A long-standing tradition is Full Moon on the Quad. In its oldest form it was an event at which "a Stanford girl becomes a Stanford woman ... when kissed by a senior man in front of Memorial Church under the light of a full moon"; now it is a party with much kissing held on the first full moon of winter quarter.

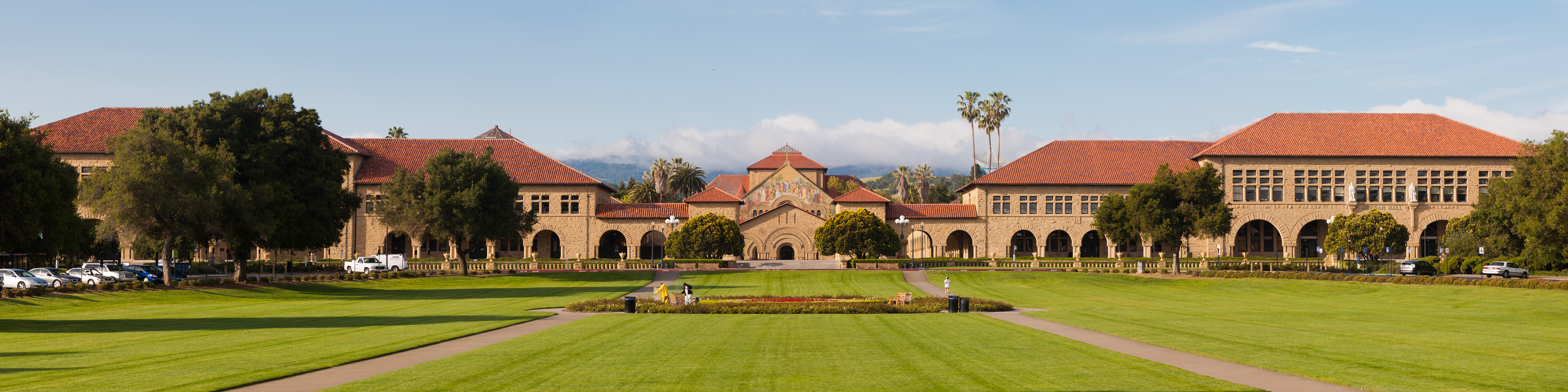
View of the main quadrangle of Stanford University with Memorial Church in the center background from across the grass covered Oval. The History Corner is to the left (partially obscured by a tree) and the Math Corner to the right.

== Namesakes ==
- The university's annual yearbook is called the Stanford Quad.
- The Stanford Historical Society's journal is called Sandstone and Tile, named for the materials from which the Quad is built.
