= Main Quad =

Main Quad may refer to

- Main Quad (Stanford University)
- Main Quad on the campus of the University of Illinois at Urbana–Champaign
- Main Quad, also called the “God Quad”, on the Campus of the University of Notre Dame

== See also ==
- Quadrangle (architecture)
