= Christopher Street =

Street in Manhattan, New York

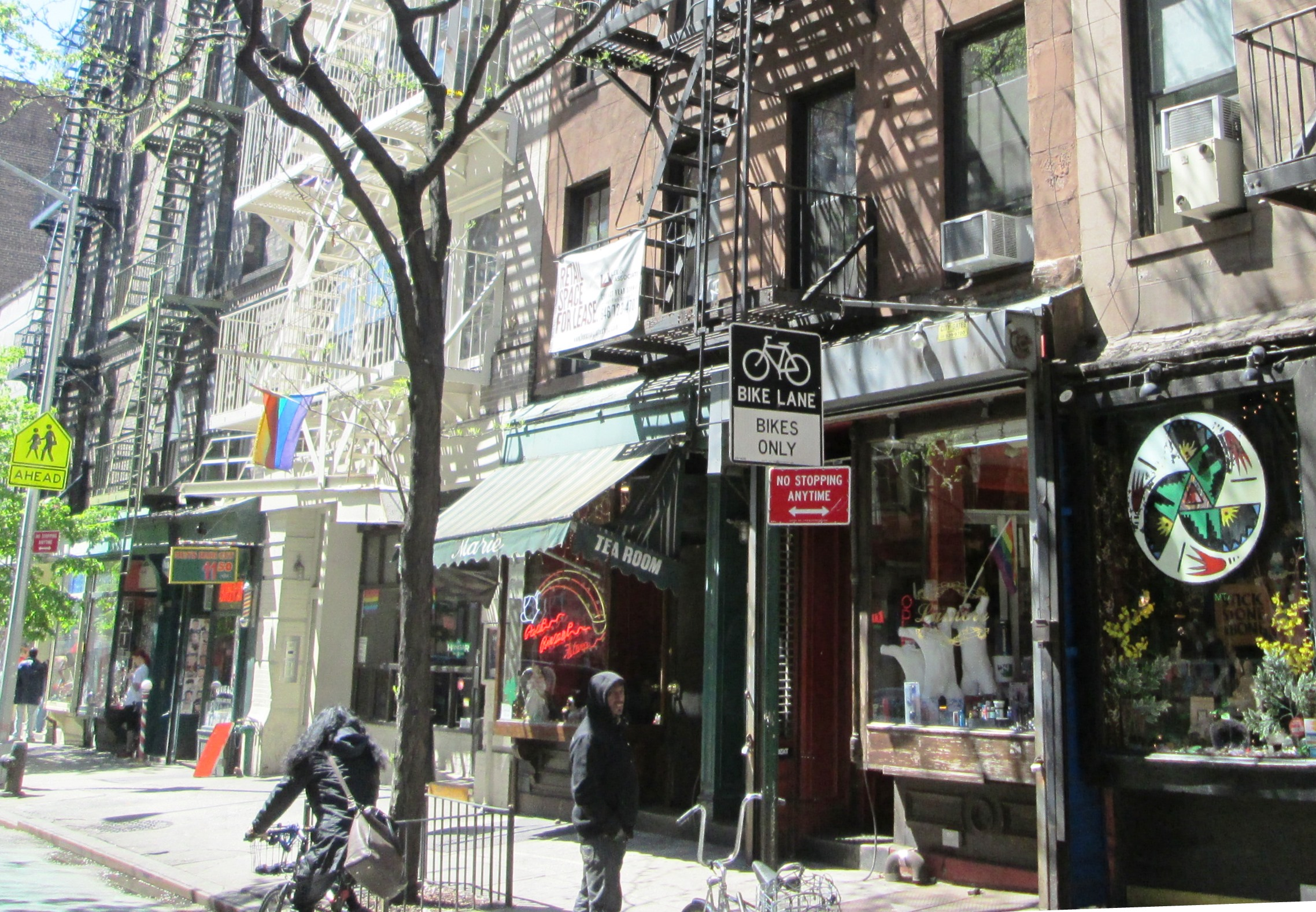
- Shops on Christopher Street between Bleecker and Hudson Streets
- Namesake: Charles Christopher Amos
- Location: West Village, Lower Manhattan, New York City
- Postal code: 10014
- Coordinates: 40°44′00″N 74°00′18″W
- West end: West Street
- East end: Sixth Avenue

Christopher Street is a street in the West Village neighborhood of the New York City borough of Manhattan. It is the continuation of 9th Street west of Sixth Avenue in Lower Manhattan.

It is most notable for the Stonewall Inn, which is located on Christopher Street near the corner of Seventh Avenue South. As a result of the Stonewall riots in 1969, the street became the center of the world's gay rights movement in the 1970s. To this day, the inn and the street serve as an international symbol of gay pride.

Christopher Street is named after Charles Christopher Amos, the owner of the inherited estate which included the location of the street. Amos is also the namesake of nearby Charles Street, and of the former Amos Street, which is now West 10th Street.

== History ==
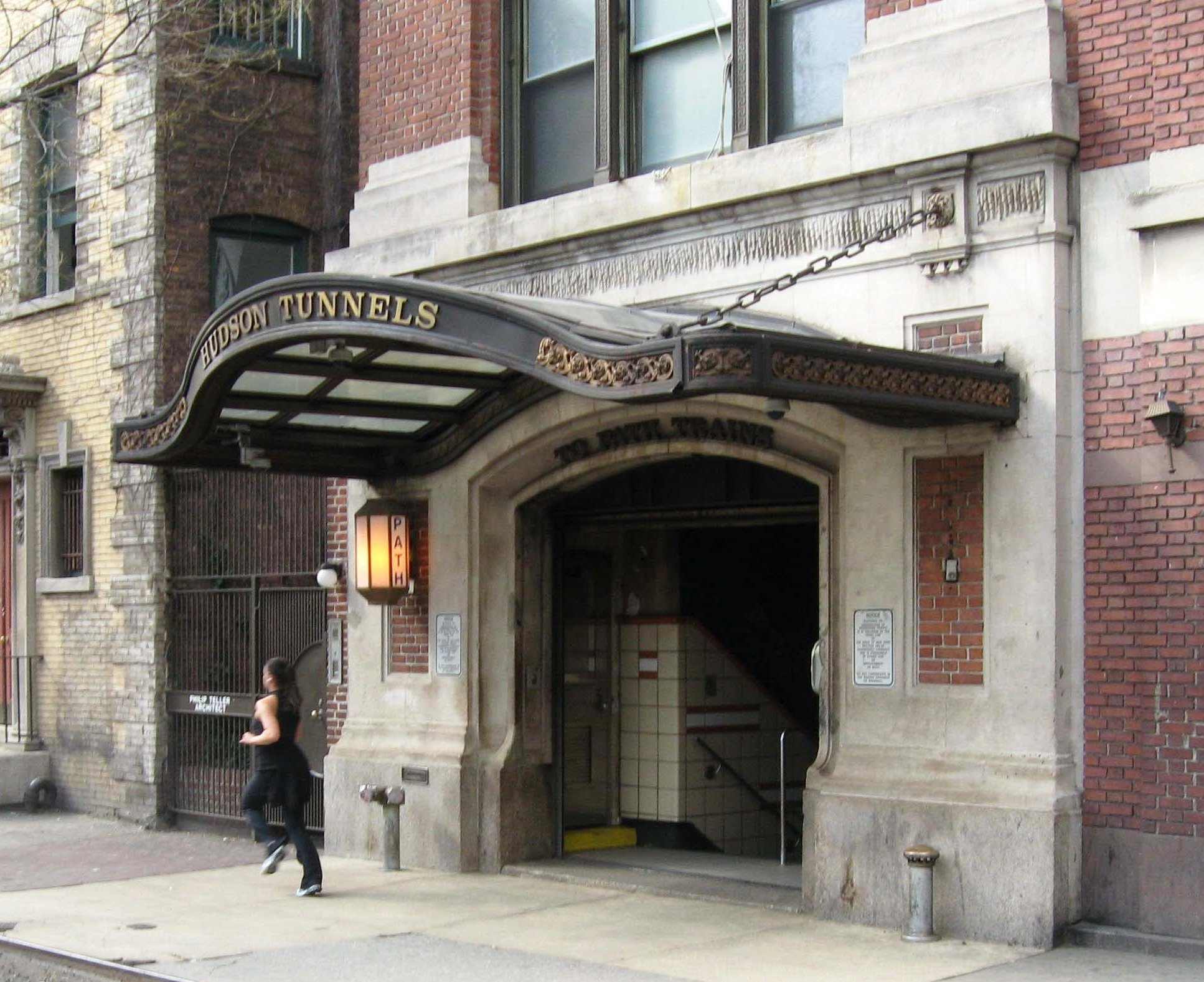
Christopher Street PATH station

Christopher Street is, technically, the oldest street in the West Village, as it ran along the south boundary of Admiral Sir Peter Warren's estate, which abutted the old Greenwich Road (now Greenwich Avenue) to the east and extended north to the next landing on the North River, at present-day Gansevoort Street. The street was briefly called Skinner Road after Colonel William Skinner, Sir Peter's son-in-law. The street received its current name in 1799, when the Warren land was acquired by Warren's eventual heir, Charles Christopher Amos. Charles Street remains, but Amos Street is now 10th Street.

The road ran past the churchyard wall of the Church of St. Luke in the Fields (built 1820–22; rebuilt after a fire, 1981–85) still standing on its left, down to the ferry landing, commemorated in the block-long Weehawken Street (laid out in 1829), the shortest street in the West Village. At the Hudson River, with its foundation in the river and extending north to 10th Street, Newgate Prison, the first New York State Prison, occupied the site from 1796 to 1829, when the institution was removed to Sing Sing and the City plotted and sold the land.

West Street is on more recently filled land, but the procession of boats that had made the inaugural pass through the Erie Canal stopped at the ferry dock at the foot of Christopher Street, November 4, 1825, where it was met by a delegation from the city; together they proceeded to the Lower Bay, where the cask of water brought from the Great Lakes was ceremoniously emptied into the salt water. In 1961, Jane Jacobs, resident in the area and author of The Death and Life of Great American Cities published that same year, headed a group that successfully stopped Mayor Robert Wagner's plan to demolish twelve blocks along West Street north of Christopher Street, including the north side of Christopher Street to Hudson Street, and an additional two blocks south of it, slated for "urban renewal".

== Gay icon ==
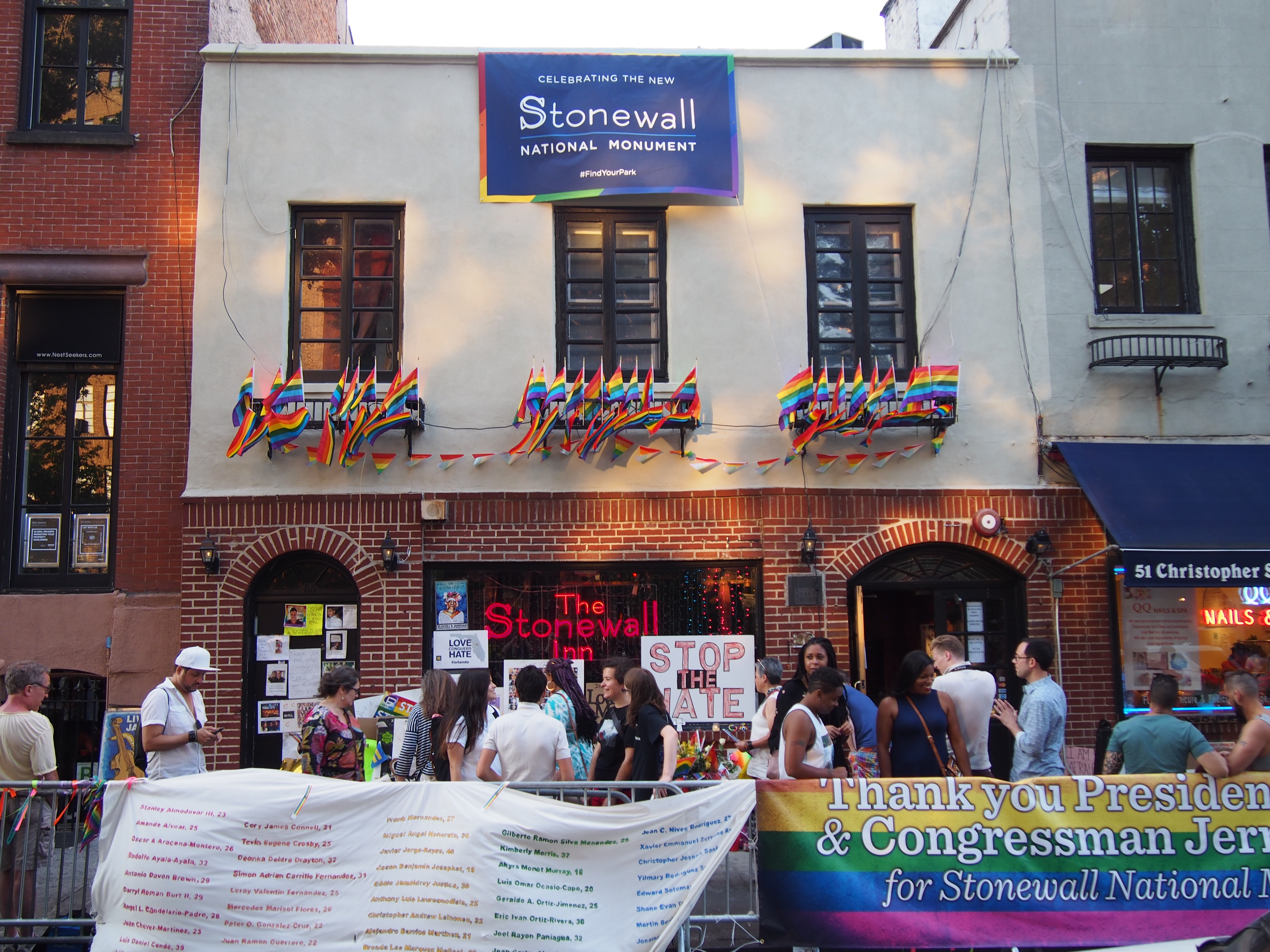
The Stonewall Inn on Christopher Street in Greenwich Village, a designated U.S. National Historic Landmark and National Monument, as the site of the June 1969 Stonewall riots and the cradle of the modern gay rights movement

Christopher Street is the site of the Stonewall Inn, the bar whose patrons fought back violently in June 1969 against a police raid, sparking the Stonewall riots that are widely seen as the birth of the gay liberation movement. The Christopher Street Liberation Day Committee formed to commemorate the first anniversary of that event, the beginning of the international tradition of a late-June event to celebrate gay pride. The annual gay pride festivals in Berlin, Cologne, and other German cities are known as Christopher Street Days.

In part because of the riots at the Stonewall Inn, the LGBT community came to congregate around Christopher Street. By the early 1970s, other LGBT businesses had opened along the street, even as the bar itself had closed. A commentator for The Advocate wrote in 1972 that the riots had succeeded in associating Christopher Street's name with LGBT culture, while a 1982 Washington Post article described the street, and particularly the bar's site, as the "birthplace of the gay rights movement in this country".

Large numbers of gay men would stroll its length at seemingly all hours. Gay bars and stores selling leather fetish clothing and artistic decorative items flourished at that time. This changed dramatically with the loss of many gay men during the AIDS epidemic in the 1980s, as well as the growth of other nearby Manhattan neighborhoods (such as Chelsea and Hell's Kitchen) as centers of gay life. Christopher Street magazine, a respected gay magazine, began publication in July 1976 and folded in December 1995. Anaïs Nin once worked at Lawrence R. Maxwell Books, located at 45 Christopher Street.

On June 23, 2015, the Stonewall Inn was the first landmark in New York City to be recognized by the New York City Landmarks Preservation Commission on the basis of its status in LGBT history, and on June 24, 2016, the Stonewall National Monument was named the first U.S. National Monument dedicated to the LGBTQ-rights movement. The visitor center opened on June 28, 2024, as the first official national visitors center dedicated to the LGBTQ+ experience to open anywhere in the world. Numerous politicians and celebrities participated in the inauguration ceremonies, and the New York City Subway's Christopher Street–Sheridan Square station was renamed the Christopher Street–Stonewall station on the same day.

=== Iconic locations ===
Near Sixth Avenue, Christopher Street intersects with a short, winding street, coincidentally named Gay Street. Since 1992, Christopher Park, located at the intersection of Christopher, Grove, and West 4th Streets, has hosted a duplicate of the sculpture Gay Liberation Monument by George Segal to commemorate the gay rights traditions of the area. The Oscar Wilde Bookshop, located on the corner of Christopher and Gay, was the oldest LGBT bookshop in the world until it closed in 2009.

== Other locations ==
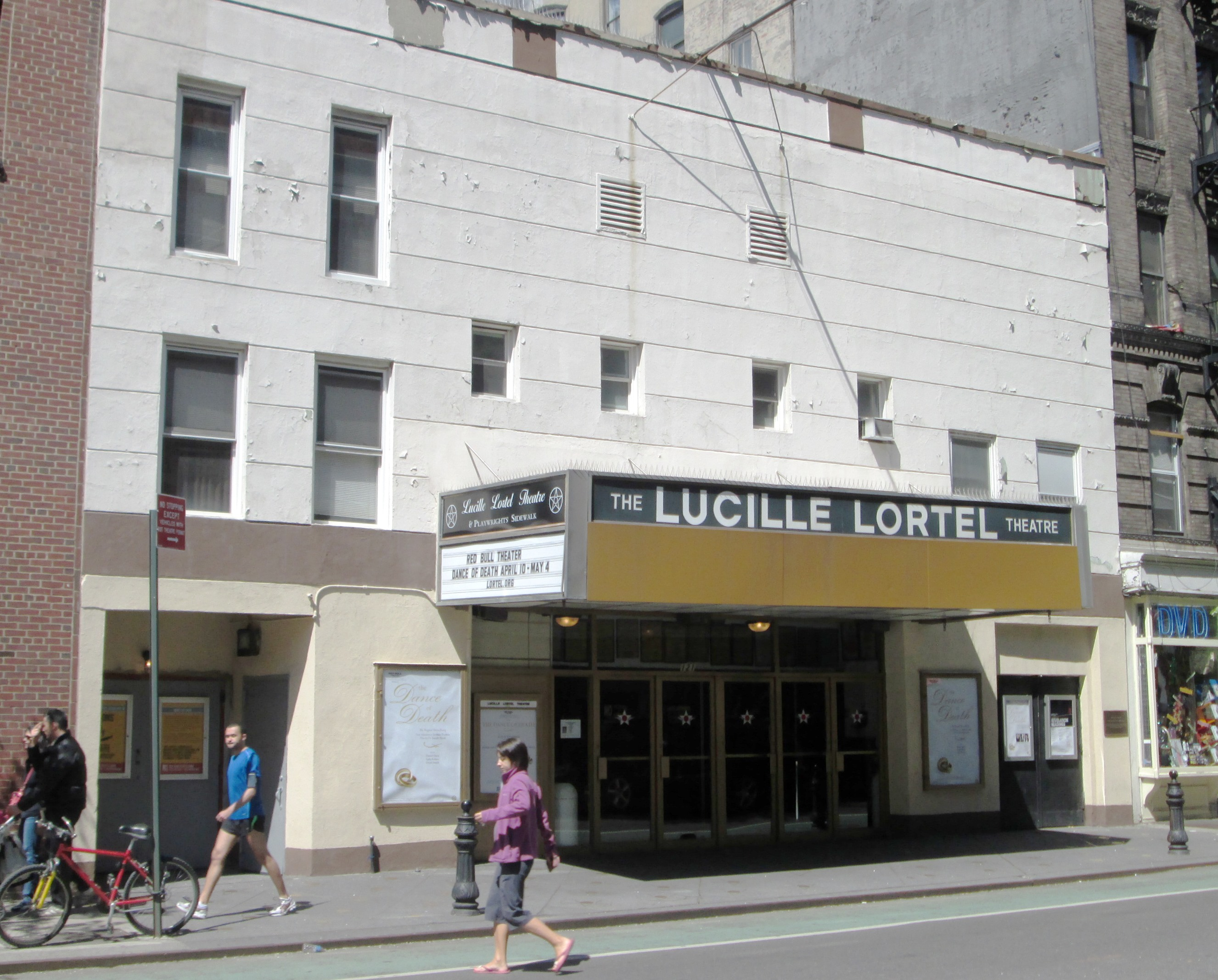
Lucille Lortel Theatre

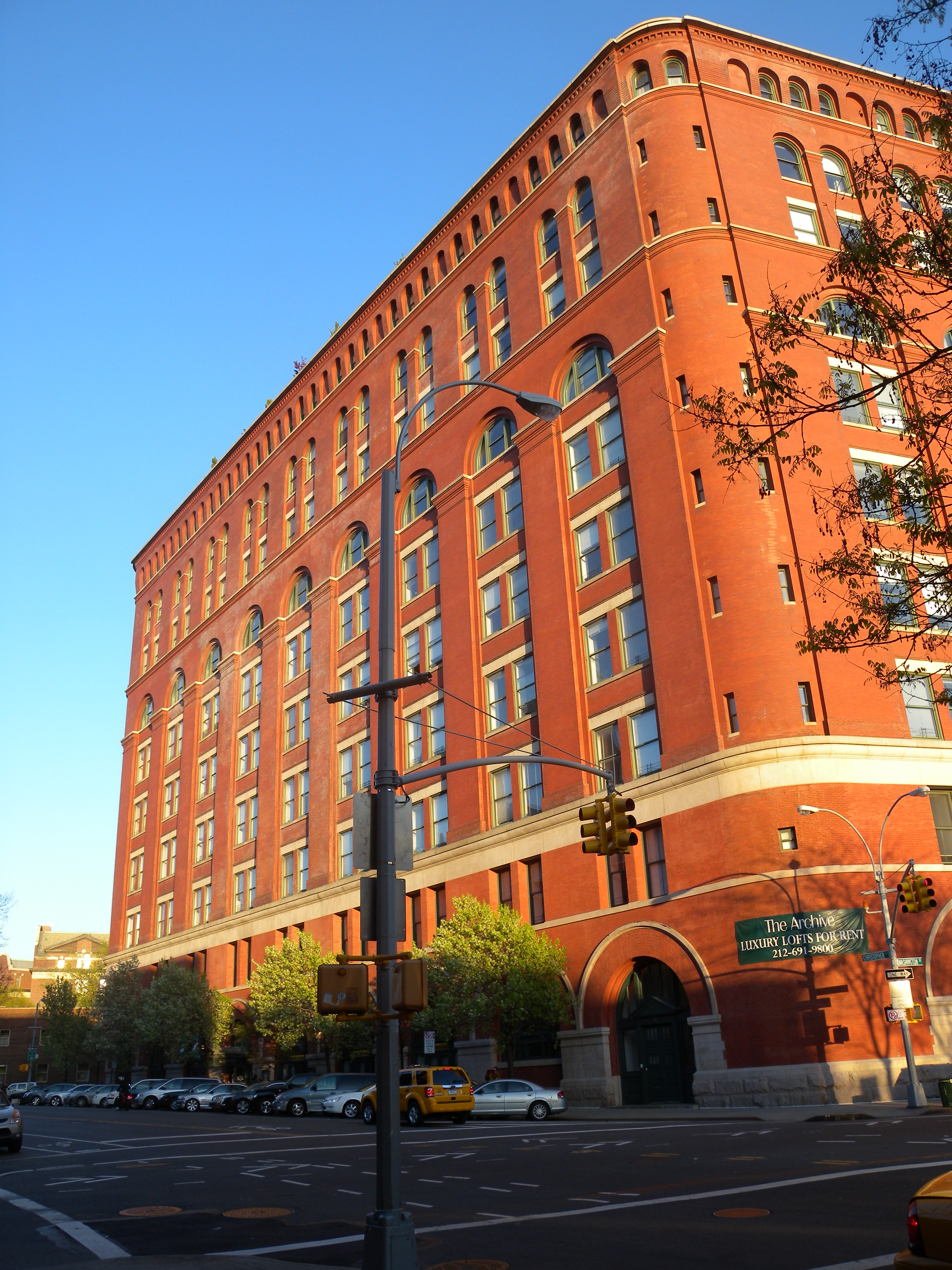
Former United States Appraiser Store, later a Federal Office Building, now The Archive, an apartment building on the National Register of Historic Places and a New York City landmark

- McNulty's Tea and Coffee Company, a purveyor dating back to 1895, is on the street.
- Kettle of Fish, a bar now on Christopher Street (on the site of the famous Lion’s Head literary bar, was once located above the famous Gaslight Cafe on MacDougal Street. Since the Beat Generation, it has also become affiliated with Green Bay Packers fans.
- Adjacent to Sheridan Square is Christopher Park, a .145 acre landmark. The park that contains a bronze statue of Philip Sheridan and a reproduction of George Segal's Gay Liberation, originally located at Stanford University.
- St John's Lutheran Church is at 81 Christopher Street, between Bleecker and West 4th Streets.
- The Lucille Lortel Theatre, formerly the Theatre de Lys, an Off-Broadway playhouse, is located at 121 Christopher Street.
- At the westernmost tip is the Christopher Street Pier, which was recently renovated and converted into a waterfront park.
- Christopher Street is the first stop in Manhattan on the 33rd Street branches of the PATH. The PATH identifies Christopher Street station with a large single capital 'C'.
- The street also hosts a station on the New York City Subway's IRT Broadway–Seventh Avenue Line at Christopher Street–Stonewall (1 and 2 trains), Formerly, the Christopher Street elevated station served the now-demolished IRT Ninth Avenue Line.
- At the southwest corner of Seventh Avenue and Christopher Street is the Hess triangle, a mosaic which reads "Property of the Hess Estate Which Has Never Been Dedicated for Public Purpose". A surveying error for the subway line left this small triangle remaining in private possession.

All locations can be accessed via the westbound M8 bus, which runs along the entire street (eastbound buses use West 10th Street).

== Notable current and past residents ==
- Theodor W. Adorno, philosopher and cultural theorist, once lived at 45 Christopher Street
- Richard Amos, brother of Charles Christopher Amos, member of the Culper Spy Ring in New York City during the American Revolutionary War
- Eva Amurri, actor
- Bob Balaban, actor and writer, lived at 95 Christopher Street
- Vincent Canadé, artist, lived at 86 Christopher Street in the 1930s
- James Coco, actor, once lived at 45 Christopher Street
- E. E. Cummings, poet, lived at 11 Christopher Street in 1918
- Harlan Ellison, science fiction author, lived at 95 Christopher Street in the early 1960s
- Dick Francis, science fiction illustrator, once lived at 105 Christopher Street
- Ben M. Hall, author and founder of the Theatre Historical Society of America, lived at 181 Christopher Street where he was murdered in 1970
- Rosemary Harris, actress, once lived at 77 Christopher Street
- Philip Seymour Hoffman, actor
- Sally Kirkland, actress, once lived at 84 Christopher Street
- Luigi Lucioni, Italian-American painter known for his still lifes, landscapes, and portraits. His family emigrated to Christopher Street from Malnate, Italy in 1911.
- Peter MacNicol, actor, once lived at 95 Christopher Street
- Marshall W. Mason, theater director, lived at 165 Christopher Street for 43 years
- David "Fathead" Newman, jazz musician who lived at 95 Christopher through the 1980s
- Yoko Ono, singer and artist, once lived at 87 Christopher Street
- William Poole, member of the New York City gang Bowery Boys
- Dawn Powell, author, lived at 95 Christopher Street from 1963 to 1965
- Lindsay Price, actress
- Amy Sedaris, actress and comedian, once lived at 95 Christopher Street
- Linda Solomon, New York editor of New Musical Express and Village Voice columnist lived at 95 Christopher from 1960 to 1999
- Ted White, author and editor, once lived at 105 Christopher Street
- Lorde, New Zealand Singer and songwriter, who lives at 45 Christopher Street

== In popular culture ==
- "Christopher Street" is both a song and the main location of the 1953 musical Wonderful Town.
- The courtyard of 125 Christopher Street was the model for the sets of the 1954 thriller film Rear Window, directed by Alfred Hitchcock. The character played by James Stewart, in calling the police, gives the address of the building he has been watching as “125 West 9th Street.” This address does not exist, because West 9th Street ends at Sixth Avenue and continues west as Christopher Street.
- The 1979 episode "The Spy" of the TV show Barney Miller—about a group of New York City police detectives working in the fictional 12th Precinct in Greenwich Village—established Miller's home address as 617 Christopher Street.
- In Paul Simon's 1983 song "Rene and Georgette Magritte with Their Dog after the War," artist René Magritte and his wife Georgette "were strolling down Christopher Street when they stopped in a men's store."
- The 1999 song "My My Metrocard", by queercore punk band Le Tigre on their debut album, mentions the location.
- On the TV show NYPD Blue, season 7, episode 3 (June 2000) "The Man with Two Right Shoes" shows Christopher Street directly after detectives mention "hitting the fairy bars" to find a gay, male prostitute.
- The Lou Reed song "Halloween Parade" from his 1989 album New York begins with the line "There's a downtown fairy singing out 'Proud Mary' as she cruises Christopher Street."
- In the comic series "Preacher", it is referenced as the current address of detective Paul Bridges, implying that the tough, ruthless, and homophobic detective, was in fact homosexual.
- In The Marvelous Mrs. Maisel episode "Interesting People on Christopher St.", the main character Miriam mistaking her manager for a lesbian (the character Susie's sexuality is ambiguous), goes to Christopher St. surreptitiously asking for info on a lesbian bar, often being rebuffed as she is mistaken for an undercover cop.
