= USS Willard Keith (DD-775) =

Allen M. Sumner-class destroyer

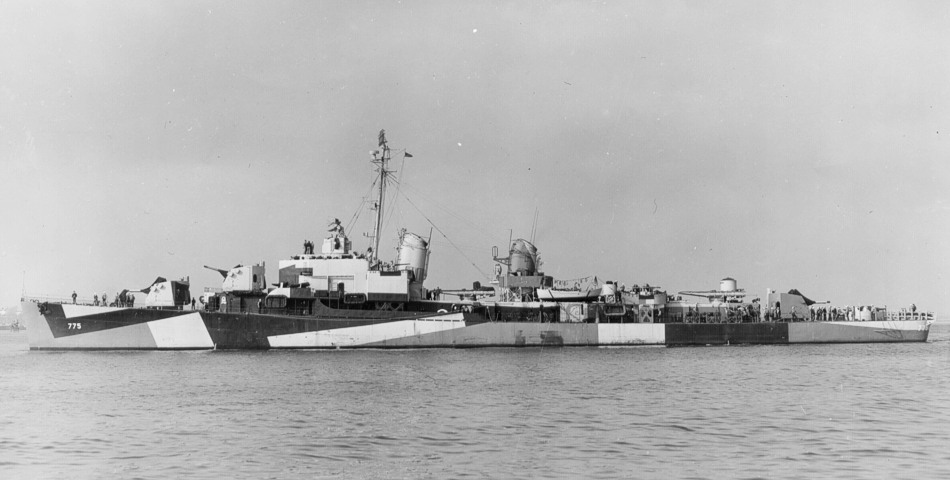
- USS Willard Keith

History

United States
- Name: Willard Keith
- Namesake: Willard Keith
- Builder: Bethlehem Shipbuilding, San Pedro
- Laid down: 5 March 1944
- Launched: 29 August 1944
- Commissioned: 27 December 1944
- Decommissioned: 1 July 1972
- Stricken: 1 July 1972
- Motto: Per Angusta Ad Augusta, Latin for "By Narrow Paths to High Places"
- Fate: To Colombia 1 July 1972

Colombia
- Name: Caldas
- Acquired: 1 July 1972
- Stricken: 1977
- Identification: DD-02
- Fate: Scrapped 1977

General characteristics
- Class & type: Allen M. Sumner-class destroyer
- Displacement: 2,200 tons
- Length: 376 ft 6 in (114.76 m)
- Beam: 40 ft (12 m)
- Draft: 15 ft 8 in (4.78 m)
- Propulsion: 60,000 shp (45,000 kW); 2 propellers
- Speed: 34 knots (63 km/h; 39 mph)
- Range: 6,500 nmi (12,000 km; 7,500 mi) at 15 kn (28 km/h; 17 mph)
- Complement: 336
- Armament: 6 × 5 in (127 mm)/38 cal. guns, 12 × 40 mm AA guns, 11 × 20 mm AA guns, 10 × 21-inch (533 mm) torpedo tubes, 6 × depth charge projectors, 2 × depth charge tracks

USS Willard Keith (DD-775), an Allen M. Sumner-class destroyer, is currently the only completed ship of the United States Navy ever named for Willard Keith, a United States Marine Corps captain who died in combat during the campaign for Guadalcanal. He was awarded the Navy Cross for his actions.

Willard Keith (DD-775) was laid down on 5 March 1944, at San Pedro, Los Angeles, by the Bethlehem Shipbuilding and launched on 29 August 1944; sponsored by Mrs. Willard W. Keith, the mother of Capt. Keith. The ship was commissioned on 27 December 1944.

== Cancelled ships ==
The US Navy had two previous contracts for destroyer escorts that were to be named USS Willard Keith; both were cancelled before they were completed. The contract for the construction of Willard Keith (DE-754)—a Cannon-class destroyer escort whose keel had been laid down on 14 September 1943 at San Pedro, California, by the Western Pipe and Steel Company—was cancelled on 2 October 1943. The contract for the construction of Willard Keith (DE-314) —an Evarts-class destroyer escort laid down on 22 January 1944 at Vallejo, California, by the Mare Island Navy Yard—was cancelled on 13 March 1944.

== Service history ==
=== World War II ===
After shakedown training out of San Diego, California, Willard Keith operated temporarily out of the Pre-commissioning Training Center at San Francisco, California, as training ship for engineering personnel. During that time, she made weekly trips from San Francisco to San Clemente Island and back.

It is rumored that, during one of these runs from San Clemente to San Francisco, Willard Keith encountered, depth-charged, and supposedly destroyed a sonar contact of unknown origin or nationality. The matter was allegedly suppressed by the ship's officers, save the eyewitness accounts of some crew members. However, no documentation or physical proof of this alleged encounter has been discovered. A few remaining crew of Willard Keith have formed a non-profit organization (The Marine War Memorial Association of Half Moon Bay, California) with the mission of finding and memorializing this alleged sunken wreck.

Completing that tour of training duty in mid-April 1945, Willard Keith sailed for the Western Pacific on 16 April, heading for Pearl Harbor in company with the cruiser Atlanta and Tillman. Willard Keith arrived at Okinawa on 29 May and was assigned screening and radar picket duties for the remainder of the Okinawa campaign, during which Willard Keith destroyed two Japanese aircraft and was struck by a Japanese torpedo from one attacker which fortunately, did not explode.

Willard Keith then joined a cruiser-destroyer task force on 24 June for anti-shipping sweeps into the East China Sea. Due to the losses the Japanese merchant marine had suffered, encounters were few. Willard Keith spent the remainder of the war engaged in such largely fruitless operations and, with the coming of the Japanese surrender, drew screening duties with the initial occupying forces in Japanese home waters. That autumn, the destroyer travelled between Japanese ports carrying men and mail.

Williard Keith was the flagship of Commodore John T. Bottom, Jr., Commander, Task Flotilla 1 and area commander while remaining at Nagoya from the last part of October until 5 December. Willard Keith rendezvoused with her sister ships in Destroyer Squadron (DesRon) 66, and sailed east, reaching the US west coast in time to spend Christmas at San Diego, California

=== 1946 ===
Subsequently, Willard Keith proceeded down the west coast; transited the Panama Canal; crossed the Gulf of Mexico and then proceeded around the tip of Florida, bound for New York City. After voyage repairs at the New York Navy Yard, Brooklyn, New York., the destroyer stood out of the yard on the last day of January and proceeded up the eastern seaboard to Newport, Rhode Island. She engaged in gunnery exercises out of that port and, upon conclusion of that first phase of her peacetime training program, returned to New York. She made five more short round trips between New York and Newport until 12 July, when she set out for Guantanamo Bay, Cuba.

After operations in the British West Indies area, Willard Keith returned to Norfolk, Virginia, from whence she escorted the battleships Washington and North Carolina to Culebra, Puerto Rico, for shore bombardment exercises. The destroyer then returned to Norfolk as part of the screen for the battlewagons, before she drew another escort assignment, this time with the aircraft carrier Philippine Sea. Conducting exercises and maneuvers en route, the carrier and her consorts reached Guantanamo Bay for training before returning northward and putting into Newport.

=== 1947-1949 ===
The destroyer operated locally between Pensacola, Florida and Key West. She sailed to Mobile, Alabama, on 13 February 1947 as one of the Navy's official representatives to the Mardi Gras festivities. For the remainder of the spring months, Willard Keith cruised routinely between Newport and Key West, carrying out training duties off the eastern seaboard.

Arriving at Norfolk on 20 June 1947, Willard Keith was assigned to the Atlantic Reserve Fleet and "mothballed" at Charleston, South Carolina Naval Shipyard until the Fleet buildup brought about by the start of the Korean War in 1950.

=== 1950-1952 ===
Recommissioned on 23 October 1950, Willard Keith was assigned to the Atlantic Fleet. After her activation was completed on 27 November, the ship departed Charleston, shaping course for Norfolk, Virginia. Subsequently, pushing on to Guantanamo Bay, acting as plane guard for the fleet carrier Intrepid en route, Willard Keith reached her destination on 13 January 1951 to commence her shakedown soon thereafter.

Completing that training phase on 22 February 1951, Willard Keith stopped briefly at Culebra for gunnery exercises before proceeding on to Norfolk and upkeep. After a three-month overhaul, the destroyer returned to the Guantanamo region for further refresher training. She then returned to Norfolk for a tender upkeep.

On 3 September 1951, Willard Keith departed the east coast, bound for the Mediterranean and duty with the 6th Fleet. Relieving Dennis J. Buckley as a unit of that force on 22 September, Willard Keith spent the next six months in the Mediterranean making operational visits to such ports as Gibraltar, Naples, Trieste, Augusta Bay, Sicily; Istanbul, Leros, and Souda Bay.

From November 1951 to February 1952, Willard Keith operated in company with John W. Weeks as a unit of the Northern European Force under the overall command of Rear Admiral W. F. Boone. During that period of time, the destroyer visited Plymouth, Copenhagen, Bornholm, Bremerhaven, Bordeaux, and Derry. While operating out of the last-named port, she conducted exercises jointly with British destroyers.

While in northern European waters, Willard Keith joining the efforts to save the crippled SS Flying Enterprise before it broke apart and sank in heavy seas; the two-week incident gaining international attention. The owners of the lost ship, the Isbrandtsen Lines, later presented a plaque to Willard Keith in appreciation for her assistance rendered to their vessel.

Completing her duty in European waters early in February 1952, Willard Keith sailed home, reaching Norfolk on 6 February for leave and upkeep. The destroyer headed north from Norfolk on 21 April 1952 for Naval Station Argentia in Newfoundland, with a party of observers from the United States Naval Underwater Sound School embarked on board. From 21 April to 12 May, the destroyer then conducted antisubmarine warfare (ASW) drills for the benefit of the observers.

Upon the ship's return to Norfolk, all hands began to make preparations for a scheduled midshipmen's cruise. In early June, the ship sailed to Annapolis, Maryland, and embarked 72 officers-to-be, taking them to Norfolk. Subsequently, Willard Keith sailed to European waters and then to Guantanamo Bay. Ports visited during the midshipmen's cruise included Torquay, England, and Le Havre, France.

Returning to Norfolk via Guantanamo, Willard Keith disembarked her passengers and resumed her routine of training. She conducted two weeks of hunter/killer training in company with the escort carrier Block Island, a task group under the command of Rear Admiral D. V. Gallery. Willard Keith put back into Norfolk at the end of November and spent the remainder of the year there.

=== 1953-1954 ===
She departed her home port nine days into the new year, though, setting sail for Pensacola, Florida, assigned as plane guard for the light carrier Monterey. En route, however, an urgent message from Commandant, 6th Naval District, directed the ship to proceed to a rendezvous with an LST which had a Marine sergeant on board who was stricken with appendicitis. Willard Keith complied and transported the man to Charleston, South Carolina, where he received medical attention. The ship received a special commendation from the Commandant of the 6th Naval District for her fine work in helping to save the man.

Ultimately completing her assigned duties in company with Monterey, Willard Keith returned to Norfolk to prepare for a scheduled 3 1/2-month overhaul. After repairs and alterations at the Philadelphia Naval Shipyard from 11 February to 27 May, Willard Keith conducted refresher training out of Guantanamo Bay after first stopping at Norfolk en route. Returning to her home port on 4 August, the destroyer subsequently sailed for the Far East on 25 September in company with the other ships of Destroyer Division (DesDiv) 221.

The division reached Yokosuka, Japan, on 10 November 1953, via Bermuda, Gibraltar, Naples, Port Said, Aden, Colombo, and Manila. Willard Keith and her sister ships operated with Naval Forces, Far East, under the overall command of Rear Admiral Robert P. Briscoe. Operating with the hunter/killer group for the initial part of her time in the Far East, the destroyer served with part of the United Nations Blockading and Escort Group. In company with James C. Owens, Willard Keith performed plane guard services for two weeks with the Australian aircraft carrier, HMAS Sydney, as that ship conducted flight operations. During the course of the tour, Willard Keith visited the ports of Sasebo and Yokosuka, Japan; Inchon, Korea; and Buckner Bay, Okinawa.

Completing her WestPac tour in March 1954, Willard Keith and her squadron mates returned to the United States via Midway; Hawaii; San Francisco; Long Beach; the Panama Canal; Havana, Cuba; and Key West, Florida, returning to Norfolk on 1 May and thus completing the ship's circumnavigation of the globe. For the remainder of the year 1954, Willard Keith operated from Labrador to the Caribbean, taking part in ASW exercises and amphibious exercises interspersed with routine upkeep periods in port.

=== 1955-1977 ===
After spending Christmas, 1954, in her home port, Willard Keith departed Norfolk five days into the new year, 1955, bound for the Mediterranean. She paid goodwill calls at the ports of Algiers, Naples, Genoa, and the Azores in the course of her extended deployment, before she returned to Norfolk on 15 March. Then, after a brief upkeep period, Willard Keith offloaded stores and ammunition and shifted to the Norfolk Naval Shipyard for a four-month overhaul. Emerging from the shipyard on 8 August, the destroyer conducted refresher training out of the familiar waters of Guantanamo Bay before conducting gunfire support exercises with the rest of her division at Culebra. Returning northward that autumn, she conducted amphibious warfare gunfire support exercises as a fire support unit during Marine Corps amphibious landing exercises off the coast of North Carolina.

For the next seven years, Willard Keith remained with DesRon 22, operating from the Atlantic Ocean to the Red Sea and Persian Gulf. She participated in a variety of goodwill missions, midshipmen cruises, and the usual training assignments in gunnery, ASW, and the like. She also participated in the "quarantine" operations in the autumn of 1962 during the Cuban Missile Crisis. The ship took part in the opening of the St. Lawrence Seaway in 1959—during which Willard Keith escorted the royal yacht HMY Britannia with Queen Elizabeth II on board.

On 1 October 1963, Willard Keith began a new phase of her career. Reporting to DesRon 34 for duty, the warship soon commenced operating as a Naval Reserve training (NRT) ship. For the next nine years, Willard Keith operated in that capacity, accomplishing reserve training with monthly drill weekend cruises for the reservists permanently assigned to the ship's reserve crew and undertaking two-week active duty training cruises for reservists getting their annual active sea duty training. She ranged from the eastern seaboard to Guantanamo Bay as an NRT destroyer, providing the platform for training necessary to maintain a skilled pool of reservists ready for any eventuality.

Ultimately considered to have capabilities that were not up to modern Fleet standards, Willard Keith was chosen for inactivation and transfer. Decommissioned on 1 July 1972 at Norfolk, Virginia, Willard Keith was transferred to the Navy of the Republic of Colombia. Simultaneously stricken from the Navy list, the destroyer was renamed Caldas (DD-02). She served the Colombian Navy until disposed of in 1977.

Willard Keith (DD-775) earned two battle stars for her World War II service.
