= Full Moon on the Quad =

Annual tradition at Stanford University

Full Moon on the Quad, also referred to as FMOTQ, is an annual tradition at Stanford University. During the event, students gather at Main Quad and kiss one another starting at midnight. Typically organized by the Junior class cabinet, the festivities include live entertainment, such as music and dance performances.

The tradition has undergone many changes since its inception. It originally featured female Stanford first-years lining up to receive a rose and a kiss on the cheek from male Stanford seniors, but eventually, the tradition lost its formality and came into its present form. The event originally occurred under the first full moon of the year, but in 2017, it was pushed back to the first full moon of winter quarter to encourage greater participation from first-years. As the tradition has progressed and with the wake of the Me Too movement, there has been a greater emphasis on consent. The most recent iteration involved participants wearing different colored glowing necklaces, with green indicating openness to a kiss, yellow indicating openness to just a hug, and red indicating intentions to only observe.
