= Willard Keith =

Willard Woodward Keith, Jr.
- Born: June 13, 1920; Berkeley, California, US
- Died: November 3, 1942 (aged 22); Killed in action at Guadalcanal
- Military career
- Allegiance: United States
- Branch: United States Marine Corps
- Service years: 1939–1942
- Rank: Captain
- Unit: 2nd Battalion, 5th Marines
- Conflicts: World War II: Battle of Tulagi; Battle of Guadalcanal; Matanikau Offensive †
- Awards: Navy Cross; Purple Heart; Combat Action Ribbon; Presidential Unit Citation

Willard Woodward Keith, Jr. (June 13, 1920 – November 3, 1942) was a United States Marine Corps infantry officer who was posthumously awarded the Navy Cross for his heroic leadership during World War II in the Matanikau Offensive of the Guadalcanal Campaign. Two cancelled United States Navy destroyer escorts and the destroyer USS Willard Keith (DD-775) were named in his honor.

== Biography ==
Willard Woodward Keith, Jr. was born on June 13, 1920 in Berkeley, California to Adeline Norine (née Donnelly) Keith and Willard Woodward Keith, Sr. H His father was the Southern California Director of Civilian Defense. Keith, Jr. graduated from Beverly Hills High School in 1937, and from Stanford University in 1941. He joined the United States Marine Corps Reserve on April 18, 1939, and served in the enlisted ranks until he received an honorable discharge on November 3, 1940, to take an appointment as a 2nd lieutenant in the Reserves on the following day.

Keith was called to active duty on February 20, 1941, then attended Marine Raiders training on the east coast. He married Peggy Winchell on August 6, 1941 in Washington, DC.

He remained in the States until his unit was transferred to the South Pacific in the spring of 1942 during the build up for the first Allied offensive in that theater — the Battle of Guadalcanal. He was with the first unit to land on Guadalcanal for the battle, initially serving on the staff of the commander of the landing party, then being assigned to the assault forces of the ground combat element. He landed with the Marines at Tulagi on Solomon Islands on August 7, 1942, during the Battle of Tulagi toward the end of the Japanese Tulagi campaign. His unit then became part of the invasion force of the Guadalcanal campaign.

Promoted to captain, Keith led Company G, 2nd Battalion, 5th Marines in the initial phase of the Guadalcanal Campaign. By autumn, the campaign was still a hard-fought one. In an offensive aimed against Japanese artillery positions sited beyond the Matanikau River and within range of the important Henderson Field airstrip, 2nd Battalion, 5th Marines was assigned to the left flank position.

During the November offensive, a period known as "Critical November" to the allied forces for its importance to the larger campaign in the Pacific theater, the Marines launched a coordinated assault using air, ground and maritime forces against a Japanese stronghold at Kokumbona. On November 2, during the Fourth Battle of the Matanikau, the Marines pushed the Japanese forces to the beach near Point Cruz. That afternoon, Captain Keith led his company against a Japanese strong-point that was entrenched on high ground and concealed by heavy jungle growth. The defending Japanese forces were reinforced with heavy machine guns. Realizing that neither mortar nor artillery fire could reach the Japanese positions, determined to evict the Japanese, Keith initiated successive bayonet and hand grenade charges in the face of heavy fire. The Marines under his leadership continued the attack and drove the Japanese forces from their stronghold. Although the Japanese forces were annihilated, Keith was struck in the head by a bullet and killed instantly. During the battle, he was interred near the Matanikau River and he is listed as unaccounted for. Later, Colonel Merritt A. Edson, the commander of 5th Marine Regiment and recipient of the Medal of Honor, said he took pride in the type of leadership displayed in Captain Keith.

For his heroic actions, Captain Willard W. Keith, Jr. posthumously received the Navy Cross for a "grim determination and aggressive devotion to duty" in keeping with the "highest traditions of the naval service." The 1st Marine Division (Reinforced) – of which the 2nd Battalion, 5th Marines was a part – received the Presidential Unit Citation.

Keith was survived by his wife, Peggy Keith, who was an artist for the Los Angeles Times.

== Navy Cross citation ==
The President of the United States of America takes pride in presenting the Navy Cross (Posthumously) to Captain Willard Woodward Keith, Jr. (MCSN: 0-6950), United States Marine Corps Reserve, for extraordinary heroism and distinguished service while commanding Company G, Second Battalion, Fifth Marines, FIRST Marine Division, in action against enemy Japanese forces on Guadalcanal, Solomon Islands, on the afternoon of 2 November 1942. During an offensive by the battalion in the Matanikau River Area, Captain Keith, with exceptional skill and inspiring courage, led a platoon against a hostile strong point made up of a single platoon reinforced with machine guns. Although the Japanese positions were firmly entrenched on commanding ground and concealed by heavy jungle growth, Captain Keith, recognizing the inability of our mortar and artillery fire to dislodge the enemy, initiated and led successive bayonet and hand grenade charges in the face of tremendous fire until the hostile group was annihilated and he himself was killed. His grim determination and aggressive devotion to duty were in keeping with the highest traditions of the United States Naval Service. He gallantly gave up his life in the defense of his country.

— signed Secretary of the Navy, April 23, 1943

== Namesakes ==
The destroyer escort USS Willard Keith (DE-754) was named for him, but was cancelled during construction in 1943. Another destroyer escort, USS Willard Keith (DE-314) then was named for him, but in 1944 was also cancelled during construction. Finally, USS Willard Keith (DD-775), an Allen M. Sumner-class destroyer, was named in his honor as a recognized war hero. The destroyer was in commission from 1944 to 1972.

The "Willard Memorial Terrace" garden was dedicated to him in the Main Quad at Stanford University. The Captain Willard W. Keith Detachment of the Marine Corps League in Beverley Hills, California was named after him. There is also a memorial for him at the Manila American Cemetery.

Two Willard W. Keith, Jr. Fellowships in the Humanities were endowed at Harvey Mudd College in Claremont, California, in 1968 by Mr. and Mrs. Willard Keith, Sr. in honor of their son.

== See also ==
- Paul Moore Jr., received the Navy Cross on November 3, 1942, while serving as a platoon commander in Company G, 2nd Battalion, 5th Marines
