= Gay Liberation Monument =

Monument in New York City, U.S.

Gay Liberation
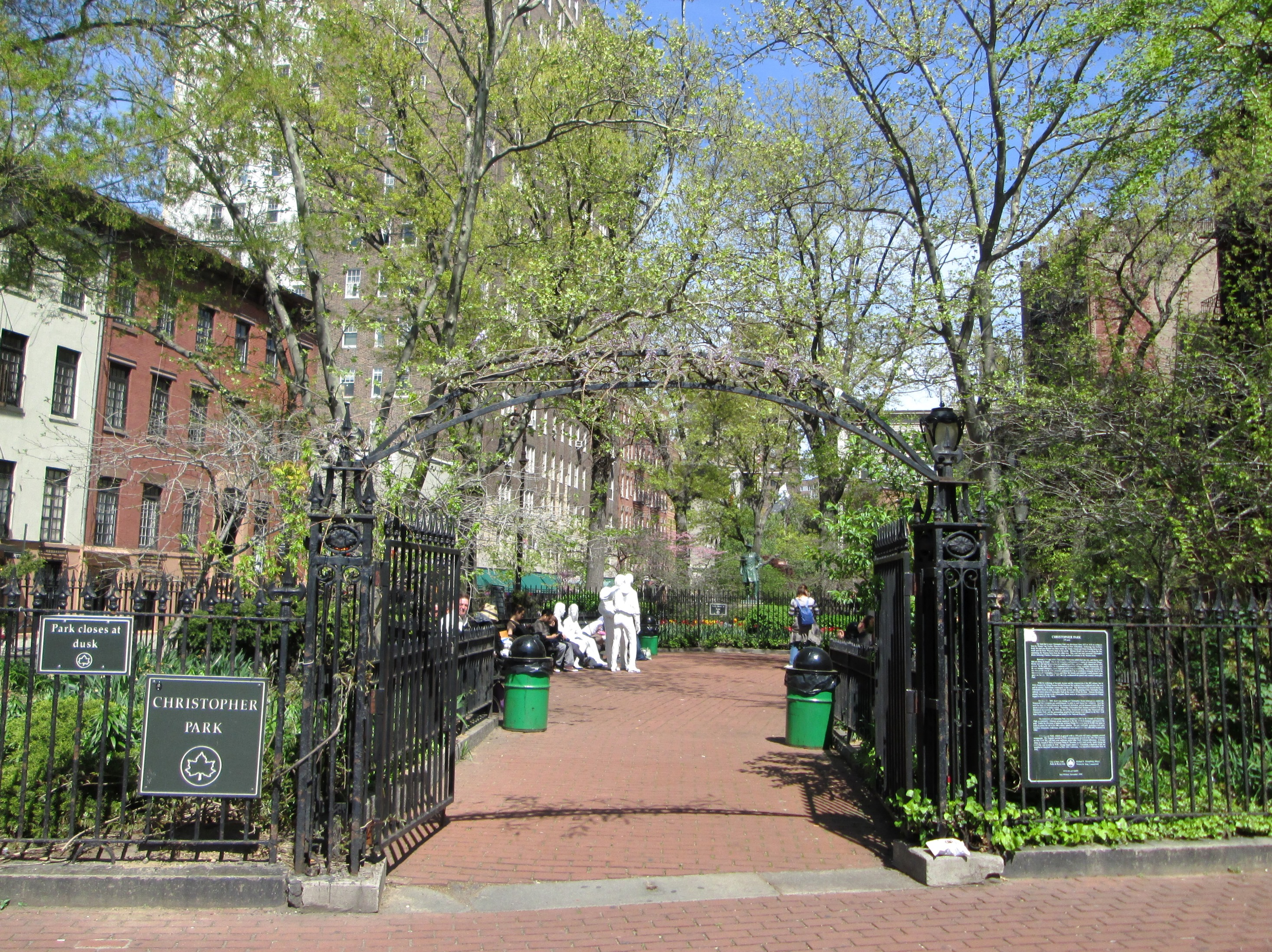
- The memorial as seen from one of the park's entrances.
- Artist: George Segal
- Year: 1980
- Type: Sculpture
- Medium: Bronze
- Location: New York City; Stanford, California; 40°44′01″N 74°00′09″W

The Gay Liberation Monument is part of the Stonewall National Monument, which commemorates the Stonewall uprising of 1969. Created in 1980, the Gay Liberation sculpture by American artist George Segal was the first piece of public art dedicated to gay rights and solidarity for LGBTQ individuals, while simultaneously commemorating the ongoing struggles of the community. The monument was dedicated on June 23, 1992, as part of the dedication of the Stonewall National Monument as a whole.

It is located directly across from the Stonewall Inn, at the northern end of Christopher Park, along Christopher Street in the West Village section of Manhattan, New York.

The sculpture depicts two pairs of life-like, life-size, affectionate couples made of bronze and painted white. One couple (two men) are standing, and the other (two women) are seated. It was originally commissioned in 1979 (the 10th anniversary of the Stonewall uprising) by the Mildred Andrews Fund, a Cleveland-based foundation that supports public art displays. The commission specified that the work must be installed on public land and that it "had to be loving and caring, and show the affection that is the hallmark of gay people. ... And it had to have equal representation of men and women".

== Background of the Stonewall Riots, the inspiration for Gay Liberation ==
The Stonewall Riots in Greenwich Village in June 1969 are widely remembered and commemorated as a watershed event in the movement for Gay liberation, and the later LGBT movements in New York City and worldwide. In the early morning hours of June 28, 1969, police forces raided the Stonewall Inn, located on Christopher Street in New York City. This was a common occurrence during an era when it was still illegal to serve liquor to out lesbian and gay people, and payoffs to the police and organized crime were a routine part of running a gay bar. A number of patrons were harassed by police. This was also common, but this time patrons fought back. An agitated crowd of patrons, gay street kids from the nearby park, and officers alike began to congregate on the nearby sidewalks. Patrons and street kids were shouting at the police and physically fighting back as the police tried to arrest them. A number of individuals in the crowd threw coins at the police, who wound up barricading themselves inside the bar. At some point the bar was set on fire. Over the rest of the night and into the next morning, then again every night for the following week, thousands of people marched in the streets, alternately confronting and fleeing from the cops. Out of this rebellion, several new activist groups such as the Gay Liberation Front, the Gay Activists Alliance, and Street Transvestite Action Revolutionaries were formed.

== History of Segal's Gay Liberation ==
=== Original plans for Gay Liberation ===
The original plan for Segal's commission by the physicist and neurologist Peter Putnam (which was introduced on the tenth anniversary of the Stonewall Riots) was to create two separate castings of Gay Liberation and to place one of them in Christopher Park in Greenwich Village, New York City, and to place the other casting in Los Angeles. Although many legislators and city organizations endorsed its commission in Greenwich Village, many local residents opposed the plans for the monument's installation. Ultimately, New York City failed to allocate the funding necessary to complete the project. The casting that had been created for placement in Los Angeles also was not ultimately displayed because the local governing body did not approve of the work, so the project was made to be fulfilled and displayed on the campus of Stanford University near San Francisco, California, in 1984.

=== Gay Liberation at Stanford University ===
Shortly after the monument was erected at Stanford, it was brutally vandalized; the culprit(s) physically cut and jabbed into the figures' faces and bodies. It is estimated that the perpetrator(s) imposed $50,000 worth of damage to the monument. Accordingly, the monument was removed from public display.

This act of vandalism was distressing to the local LGBT community, both at the university and in the surrounding neighborhood, because the location of San Francisco itself had a large and active LGBT community at the time. The fact that this attack ensued on a university campus served as a grim reminder of the lack of safety afforded to LGBT individuals in general.

The monument was repaired and then remained in storage for over a year before being re-installed on the campus of Stanford. Approximately a year after it was displayed for the second time, it was brutally vandalized again; the perpetrators painted derogatory words onto the statues.

Gay Liberation was vandalized again in the year 1994, wherein some football players on Stanford's team splattered the monument with paint and wedged a bench in between the figures of the monument. LGBT students at Stanford openly protested against the fact that this act could not be legally deemed a hate crime, as California's definition of a hate crime consists of the violation of an individual's (rather than an institution's) natural/civil liberties.

=== A brief Installation in Madison, Wisconsin ===
The other casting of Segal's Gay Liberation was initially placed in Orton Park in Madison, Wisconsin, where it remained from 1986 until 1991. While in Orton Park, the monument was vandalized on at least one occasion, though it was also loved and appreciated by many residents, who would apparently put scarves and hats on the sculpted figures during the winter months.

=== Gay Liberation in New York City ===
In the year 1992, New York City agreed to display Segal's Gay Liberation in Christopher Park, and it was removed from Madison, Wisconsin and placed in Christopher Park. During the dedication ceremony the following year, Segal apparently was surprised that there were no "religious protesters", as there had initially been considerable controversy over the commission of the monument by Catholic residents of New York City.

Despite the uneventful ceremony, there was still controversial discourse surrounding the monument when it was installed in New York City. In 2015, two anonymous people who self-described as, "queer, gender-nonconforming women" claimed credit for vandalizing the statues by painting their faces and hands black and dressing them with cheap wigs, bras, and scarves to protest what they called the statues' "whitewashing" of the history of Stonewall.

== Criticisms ==
The monument has been subject to criticism from those who say it inadequately represents the diversity of the activists who participated in the Stonewall uprising. Some of the prominent participants in the Stonewall riots, such as Stormé DeLarverie and Marsha P. Johnson were both African-American and gender-nonconforming. Delarverie was a well-known butch dyke, known for performing in popular drag revues and appearing with celebrated entertainers in Harlem. Johnson, who identified as a transvestite and "street queen", modeled for Andy Warhol and performed with the drag troupes, Hot Peaches and the Angels of Light. While not as well-known, Zazu Nova, who has at times been mistaken for Johnson, was a young, Black and gender-nonconforming participant who has been cited by a number of witnesses as one of "three individuals known to have been in the vanguard" of the pushback against police once the rioting peaked late that night (Johnson and Jackie Hormona being the other two named).

Some have criticized the monument's status as a widely recognized beacon of queer freedom. Deirdre Conlon, citing the theories of French Marxist Henri Lefebvre (1901–1991), argues that representations of space are profoundly influenced by societal systems and institutions, and that representations of space can and should be fluid and open to modification. Lefebvre argued that productions of space have been "colonized" by concrete and stagnant representations that "impose an image" and thereby establish and regulate the commemoration and memorialization of a historical moment or phenomenon. Genevieve Flavelle, writing in C Magazine, questioned whether the quiet, peaceful Gay Liberation monument adequately pays homage to the revolutionary and tumultuous history of the Stonewall Riots, writing "why does the Gay Liberation monument (1980), a George Segal commission for the 10th anniversary of the Riots, depict four figures quietly socializing in Christopher Park instead of scores of drag queens throwing high heels and ripping parking meters out of the ground?"

== An ongoing movement ==
Chris E. Vargas, the executive director of the Museum of Transgender Hirstory and Art (MOTHA), suggests it is important to narrate the Stonewall Riots as part of an active, ongoing process of LGBTQ liberation. Vargas believes Segal's Gay Liberation may not adequately represent the anti-establishment spirit of the Stonewall Riots, and questions the premise of memorializing the Stonewall Riots in a singular, static monument as this may falsely suggest that the movement is "safely placed in the past, and all the concerns of the people involved in the riots are resolved in a clean and tidy way." He suggests oral history can offer an alternative method of commemorating Stonewall, noting that within a demographic that has been historically misrepresented and heavily stereotyped, oral histories can honor a collective historical narrative from which LGBTQIA+ individuals have been historically excluded. Because many gay men were lost to the AIDS Crisis, and members of the community have been lost to suicide or were forced to live in the closet in order to preserve their safety, there has also been difficulty using oral histories to memorialize queer and trans experiences.

== Segal's description of relationships in Gay Liberation ==
The subjects of Segal's monument are depicted with physical elements that serve to shed light upon the complexity of their relationships; both couples are exhibited locking eyes, which may be interpreted as symbolizing commitment and communion, which are aspects of same-sex relationships that are unduly excluded from their depictions in popular culture and media. Segal has apparently remarked that his sculpture tends to concentrate "...on tenderness, gentleness and sensitivity as expressed in gesture", which allows the viewer to appreciate the intimacy of the partners' relationships.

== Setting in Christopher Park ==
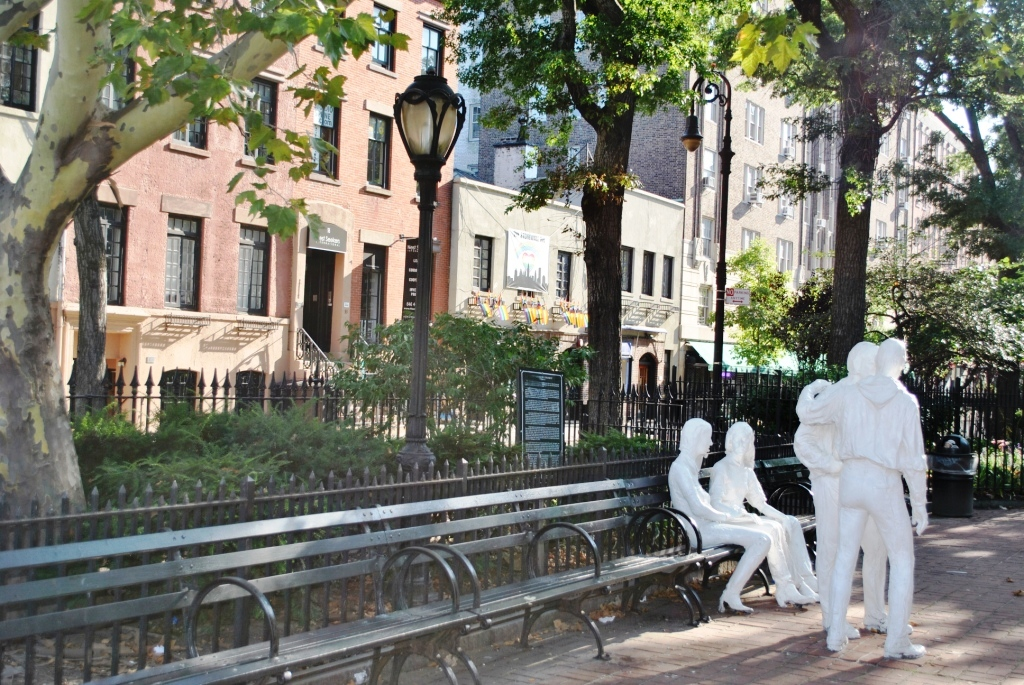
A view of Segal's sculpture in the park

Christopher Park is directly across from the Stonewall Inn, and has been at the center of the Gay liberation movement of New York City since before the Stonewall Riots of 1969, as it was already a gathering place for homeless gay street kids who slept there. In 1999, the Stonewall bar and the surrounding neighborhood streets, including Christopher Park, were placed on the New York State Register of Historic Places and added to the National Register.

== Choice of Segal as artist ==
When Segal was first approached about the possibility of commissioning Gay Liberation, he was uncertain about accepting the undertaking, and his initial reaction was that the sculpture should be done by a gay artist. He eventually decided that he would accept the project in the name of empathy and respect to the community, saying, "I'm extremely sympathetic to the problems that gay people have. They're human beings first. I couldn't refuse to do it."

Nonetheless, some have argued that Segal should not have taken the job. Responding to this criticism, Segal jokingly acknowledged himself as "an unregenerate heterosexual", but said that his heterosexuality "did not prevent him from having an insight into the natures of his gay friends."

== See also ==
- List of LGBTQ monuments and memorials
