= Oval (Stanford University) =

Oval-shaped sunken lawn on the Stanford University campus

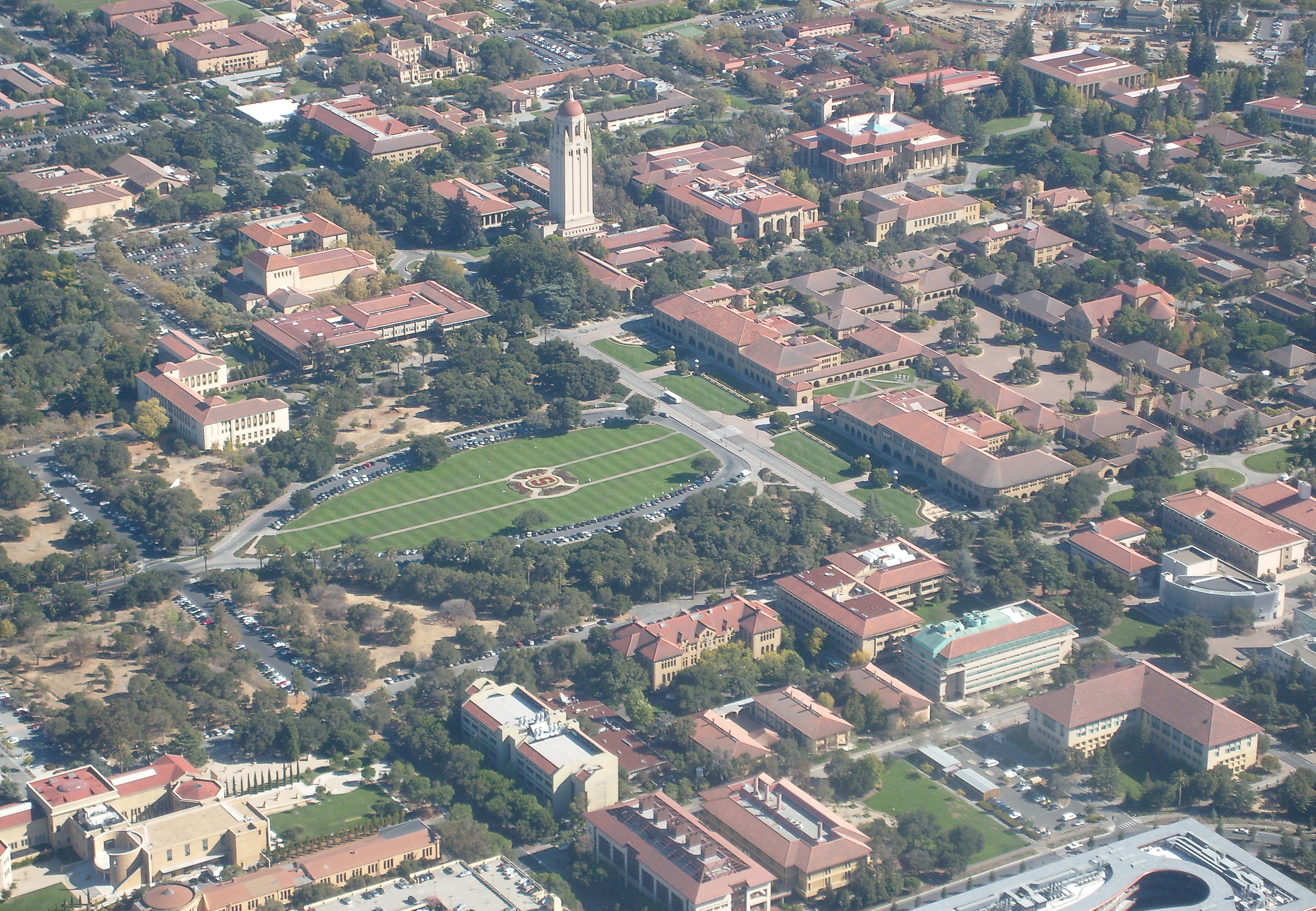
- Aerial view of the lawn
- Area: 196,000 square feet (18,200 m^{2})
- Location: Stanford University, Stanford, California, U.S.
- Location within California
- Coordinates: 37.42986°N 122.16948°W

The Oval (also known as the Stanford Oval) is an oval-shaped sunken lawn on the Stanford University campus in Stanford, California, United States. It has had flower plantings in the shape of the letter "S", for Stanford.

Though the oval space has existed since the start of the university, its current look dates from 1980 when an anonymous couple donated $150,000 for it to be renovated. A central flower garden was added and paths repaved.

The lawn once had a statue called Faith. The Olmsted Brothers recommended removing the statue in 1914. In 2020, students created a memorial in the Oval following the murder of George Floyd.

The lawn has served as a meeting place for other protests. It has also been recreated in "Stanford in Minecraft" in 2021.
