= Stonewall National Monument =

U.S. National Monument in Manhattan, New York

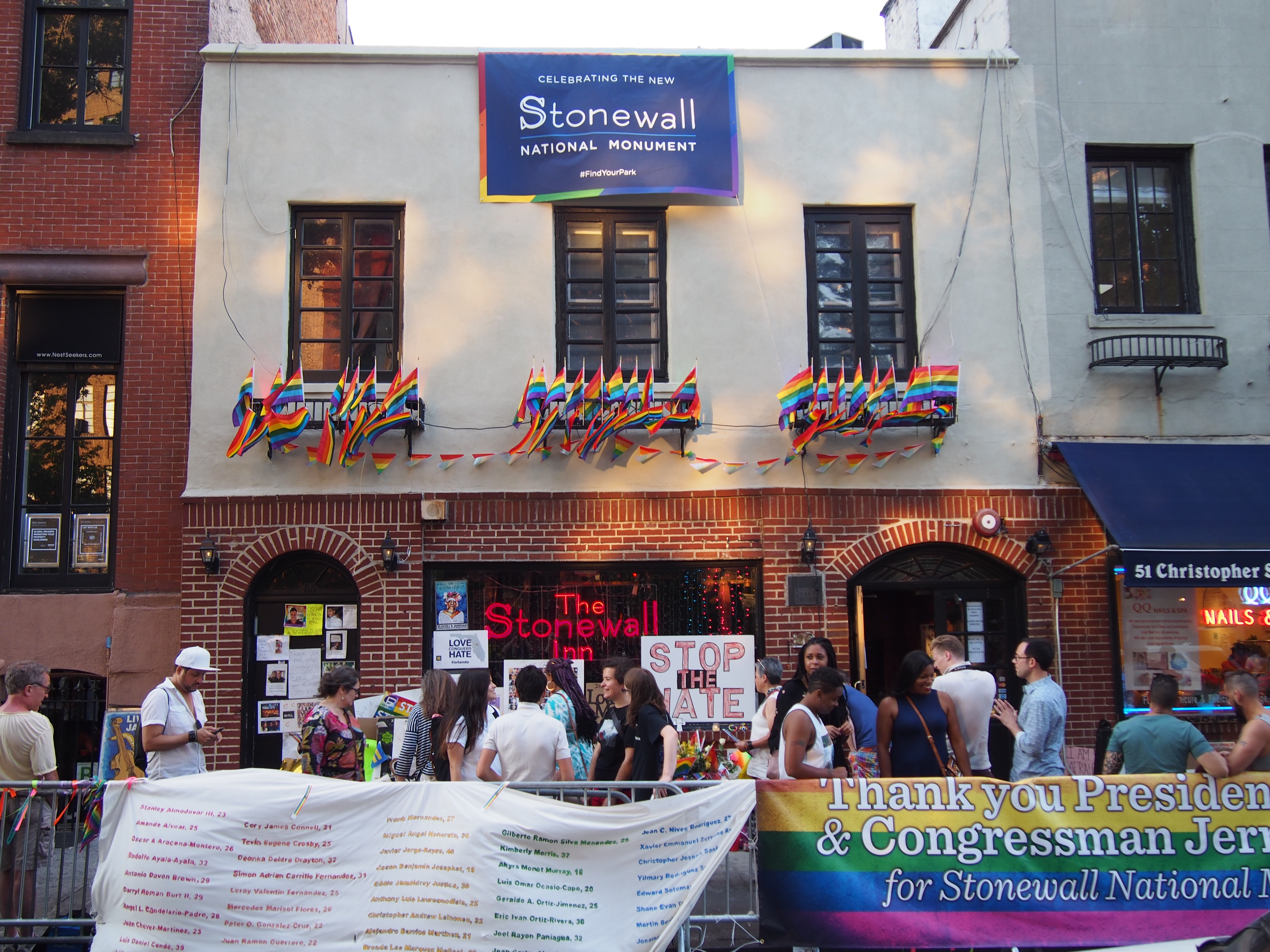
- Stonewall Inn the day after President Obama's dedication on June 24, 2016
- Interactive map of Stonewall National Monument
- 40°44′1.939″N 74°0′7.83″W
- Type: Cultural
- Location: West Village, Manhattan, New York City

History
- Built: Park: 1837; Original building: 1843; Stonewall opening: 1966; Park rebuilt: 1986

Site notes
- Area: 7.7 acres (3.1 ha) near the intersection of Christopher Street and 7th Avenue South
- Governing body: National Park Service
- Visitors: 1,581,961 (in 2022)
- Website: Stonewall National Monument; Archived version

U.S. National Register of Historic Places
- Designated: June 28, 1999 (Note: The National Register of Historic Places and National Historic Landmark designations apply to roughly the same area that encompasses the National Monument, even though these designations preceded the National Monument designation by 17 and 16 years, respectively.)

U.S. National Historic Landmark
- Designated: February 16, 2000

U.S. Historic district – Contributing property
- Designated: June 19, 1979 (Note: All of the buildings are contributing properties to the Greenwich Village Historic District, which was designated on this date.)

U.S. National Monument
- Designated: June 24, 2016

Stonewall National Monument is a 7.7-acre (3.1 ha) U.S. national monument in the West Village neighborhood of Greenwich Village in Lower Manhattan, New York City. The designated area includes the Stonewall Inn, the 0.19-acre (0.077 ha; 8,300 ft^{2}; 770 m^{2}) Christopher Park, and nearby streets including Christopher Street, the site of the Stonewall riots of June 28, 1969, widely regarded as the start of the modern LGBTQ rights movement in the United States.

Stonewall National Monument is the first U.S. national monument dedicated to LGBTQ rights and history. President Barack Obama designated it as a national monument on June 24, 2016.

== Early history ==
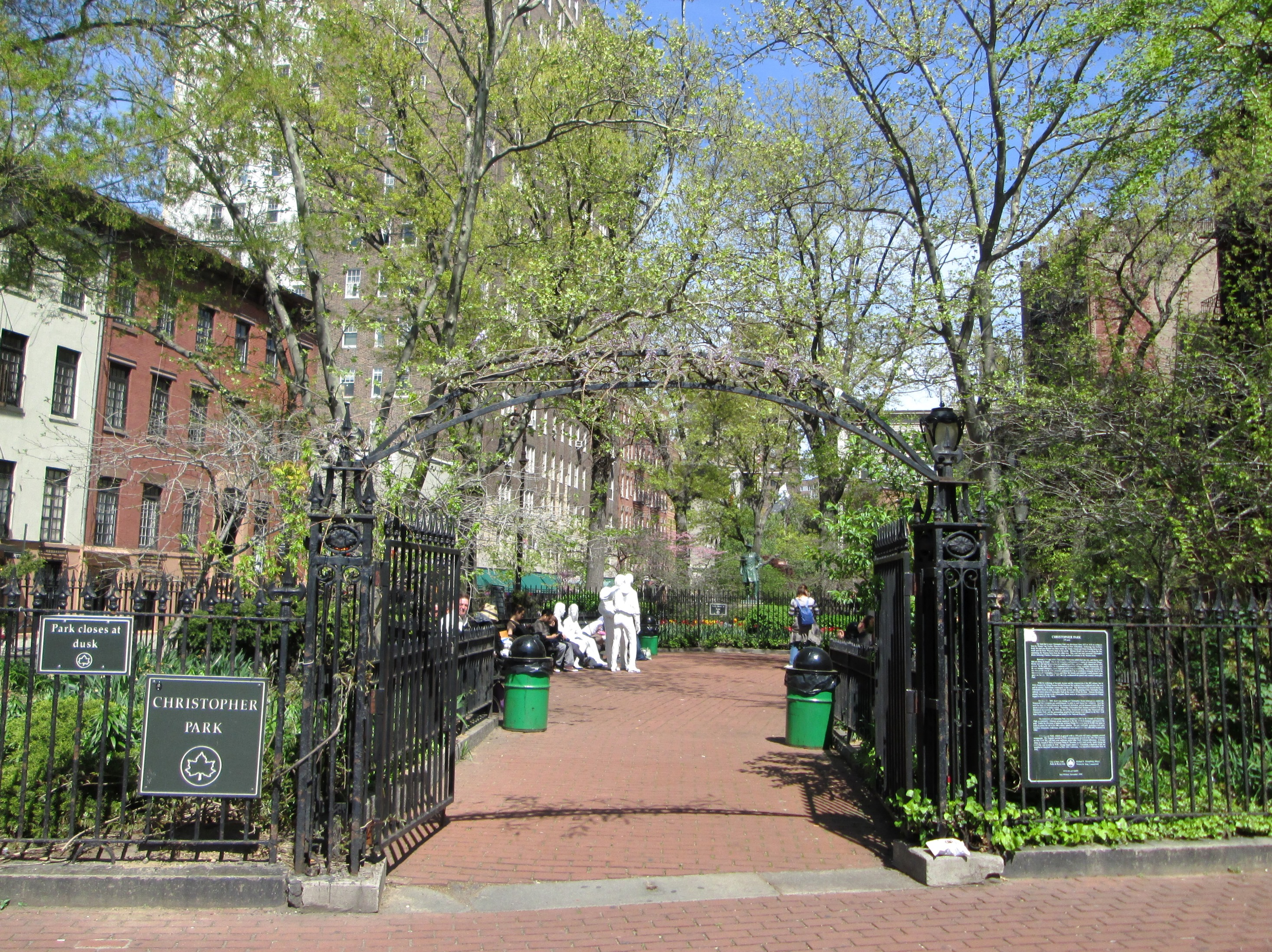
Christopher Park entrance, site of the Gay Liberation Monument

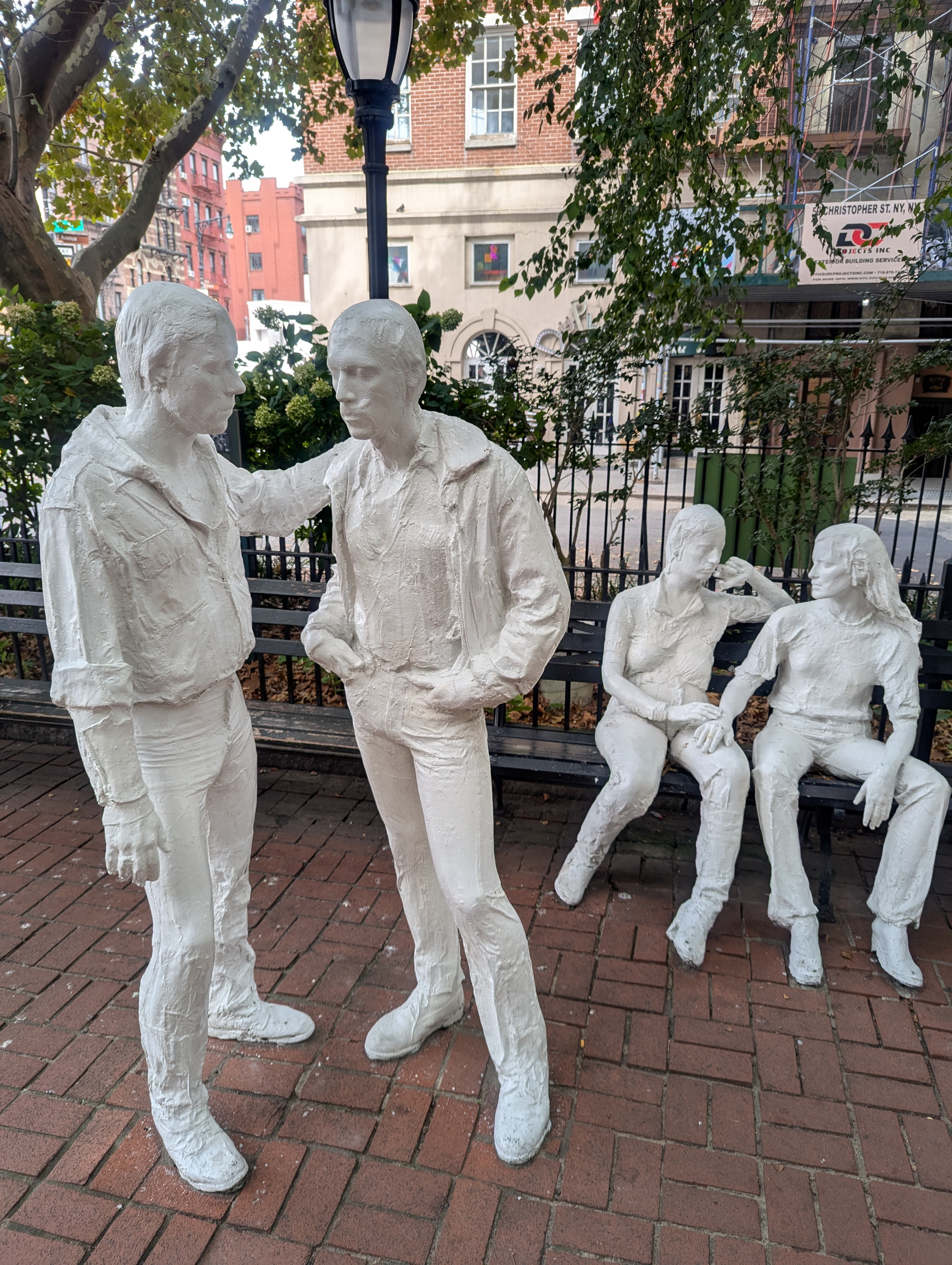
Gay Liberation by George Segal, which stands in Christopher Park

Stonewall National Monument includes and surrounds the 0.19-acre (0.077 ha; 8,300 ft^{2}; 770 m^{2}) Christopher Park, also known as Christopher Street Park, a park originally built on a lot that New Netherland Director-General Wouter van Twiller settled as a tobacco farm from 1633 to 1638, when he died. The land was subsequently split up into three different farms. Trinity Church's and Elbert Herring's farms were located in the southern part of van Twiller's former farm, and Sir Peter Warren's farm was located in the northern portion.

Because of the unusual street grid that already existed in much of Greenwich Village, the Commissioners' Plan of 1811 would not quite fit into the pre-existing street grid. This resulted in several blocks with oblique angles, as well as many triangular street blocks. The former farms of Christopher Street were split into small lots from 1789 to 1829. After a subsequent large population increase in the early 19th century, the buildings on Christopher Street were dense with people.

In 1835, the Great Fire of New York spread through the area and destroyed many city blocks. The little triangle of land bounded by Christopher, Grove, and 4th Streets, which was burned down, was condemned and turned into a park. The new Christopher Street Park, designed by architects Calvert Vaux and Samuel Parsons Jr., was opened in 1837. The Stonewall Inn, which then consisted simply of two adjacent stables, opened across Christopher Street in 1843.

The widening of 7th Avenue South, and the construction of the IRT Broadway–Seventh Avenue Line of the New York City Subway, effectively split the neighborhood into two pieces, separated by the now-widened avenue. By the 1940s, the area had deteriorated somewhat as people moved away. However, during the 1950s, the social demographics were transformed, as Beat poets and other atists moved into Greenwich Village. Meanwhile, the Stonewall Inn had changed uses; many different restaurants were housed in the inn from the 1930s through 1966.

== Role in riots and aftermath ==
In 1966, the Stonewall Inn Restaurant—which had been located within the inn since the 1950s—closed for renovations due to a fire that devastated the space. The restaurant re-opened as a tavern on March 18, 1967, under ownership of the Genovese crime family of the Mafia. The tavern was breaking rules on the sale of liquor, as it had no liquor license, but one officer of the New York City Police Department (NYPD) was reportedly accepting once-monthly bribes in exchange for allowing the tavern to go unlicensed.

On June 28, 1969, the NYPD conducted a raid on the inn, then operating as a gay bar, under the pretense that the inn did not have a liquor license. Riots started in the ensuing days, where thousands of rioters protested against the NYPD's raid. The riots solidified the Stonewall Inn's status as a gay icon. The park also played a significant role in the riots—people had gathered at the park the morning after the first day of rioting, discussing the events of the previous day.

== Later years ==
The park itself was in dire need of renovation, and so in the 1970s, the Friends of Christopher Park, which consisted entirely of volunteers mainly from the surrounding community, was created to oversee the park's upkeep. In 1983, NYC Parks embarked on a three-year, $130,000 project (equivalent to $420,231 in 2025 (Note: 1634–1699: McCusker, J. J. (1997). How Much Is That in Real Money? A Historical Price Index for Use as a Deflator of Money Values in the Economy of the United States: Addenda et Corrigenda (PDF). American Antiquarian Society. 1700–1799: McCusker, J. J. (1992). How Much Is That in Real Money? A Historical Price Index for Use as a Deflator of Money Values in the Economy of the United States (PDF). American Antiquarian Society. 1800–present: Federal Reserve Bank of Minneapolis. "Consumer Price Index (estimate) 1800–".)) to rebuild the park to its original condition. Architect Philip Winslow planted new greenery and replaced the park's benches, walkways, light fixtures, and gates.

In 1992, the Gay Liberation statue by George Segal was placed in Christopher Park, mirroring a near-identical statue at Stanford University. The statue consists of four white figures (two standing men and two seated women) positioned in "natural, easy" poses. Non-LGBT-related monuments in the park include two 1936 works that commemorated American Civil War fighters: a pole that honors the Fire Zouaves, as well as a statue made of bronze that honors Union general Philip Sheridan. The park is surrounded by a fence that dates back to at least the late 19th century. In 2023, Randy Wicker launched a petition to remove the General Philip Sheridan statue from the park because of "Sheridan's massacre of Indigenous people."

Meanwhile, across the street, the Stonewall Inn had changed hands many times from 1969 to the 1990s, finally resuming the role of a gay bar by the 1990s.

=== National and city landmark statuses ===
Map of boundaries

In 1999, David Carter, Andrew Dolkart, Gale Harris, and Jay Shockley researched and wrote the National Register of Historic Places (NRHP) report for Stonewall, which was officially sponsored by the Greenwich Village Society for Historic Preservation. When the listing was designated on June 29, 1999, it included the Stonewall Inn building, Christopher Park, and nearby streets. It became the nation's first NRHP listing, out of more than 70,000 listings at the time, dedicated exclusively to LGBT accomplishments. That same area was declared a National Historic Landmark on February 16, 2000. On June 23, 2015, the Stonewall Inn became a New York City designated landmark, making it the first city landmark to commemorate an LGBT icon.

=== National monument designation ===
After Stonewall Inn was designated as a city landmark, Greenwich Village residents lobbied for the bar and the adjacent park to be labeled a national monument. Some members of Manhattan Community Board 2 wrote a letter to the National Park Service (NPS) to request such a status for the Stonewall site. The GVSHP also supported a national monument designation for the site. In 2016, The Trust for Public Land helped New York City prepare the property for transfer. The Trust for Public Land worked with the NPS and NYC Parks to preserve the Stonewall Inn and recast Christopher Park as the Stonewall National Monument.

On June 24, 2016, President Obama designated the Stonewall National Monument (video).

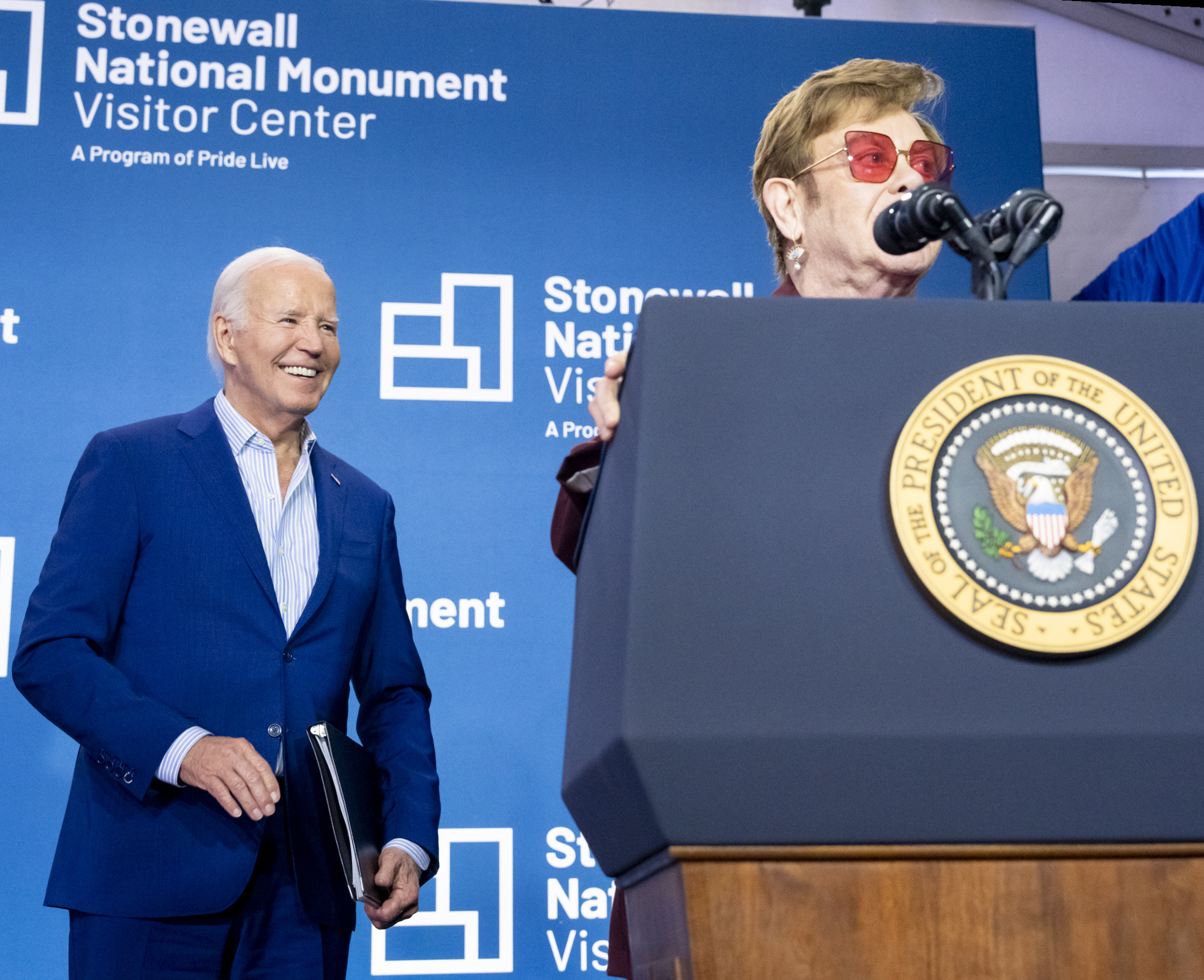
President Joe Biden listens as Elton John delivers remarks at the opening ceremony of the Stonewall National Monument Visitor Center on June 28, 2024

On June 24, 2016, President Barack Obama officially designated the Stonewall National Monument, making it the United States' first national monument designated for an LGBT historic site. The dedication ceremony was attended by New York City mayor Bill de Blasio; Senator Kirsten Gillibrand; Secretary of the Interior Sally Jewell; and the Stonewall Inn's owners. Some attendees saw the dedication as important because the Orlando, Florida, nightclub shooting, which had occurred two weeks prior to the dedication, had claimed the lives of 49 people, many of them gay Latino Americans. The national monument encompasses a 7.7-acre (3.1 ha; 340,000 ft^{2}; 31,000 m^{2}) area that includes the Stonewall Inn, Christopher Street Park, the block of Christopher Street bordering the park, and segments of some adjacent streets. Only the park was transferred to NPS ownership. The National Park Foundation formed a new nonprofit organization to raise $2 million in funds for a ranger station, visitor center, community activities, and interpretive exhibits for the monument. In October 2017, a rainbow LGBT flag was raised on the monument, making it the first officially maintained LGBT flag at a federal monument.

The LGBT+ rights organization Pride Live tried to develop a visitor center for the monument for several years after its designation. Pride Live began negotiating with the owner of the property at 51 Christopher Street in 2019; that building included a vacant storefront that had formerly been part of the inn. The building was placed for sale in June 2021, but Pride Live and the property owner ultimately came to an agreement. In June 2022, Pride Live announced that it would build the visitor center at 51 Christopher Street. MBB Architects was hired to design the visitor center, while Local Projects was responsible for designing the exhibits. Pride Live raised $3.2 million for its construction and development and plans to operate the center in cooperation with the NPS. The visitor center opened on June 28, 2024, as the first official national visitors center dedicated to the LGBTQ+ experience to open anywhere in the world. Numerous politicians and celebrities participated in the inauguration ceremonies, and the New York City Subway's Christopher Street–Sheridan Square station was renamed the Christopher Street–Stonewall station on the same day.

== Second Trump administration ==
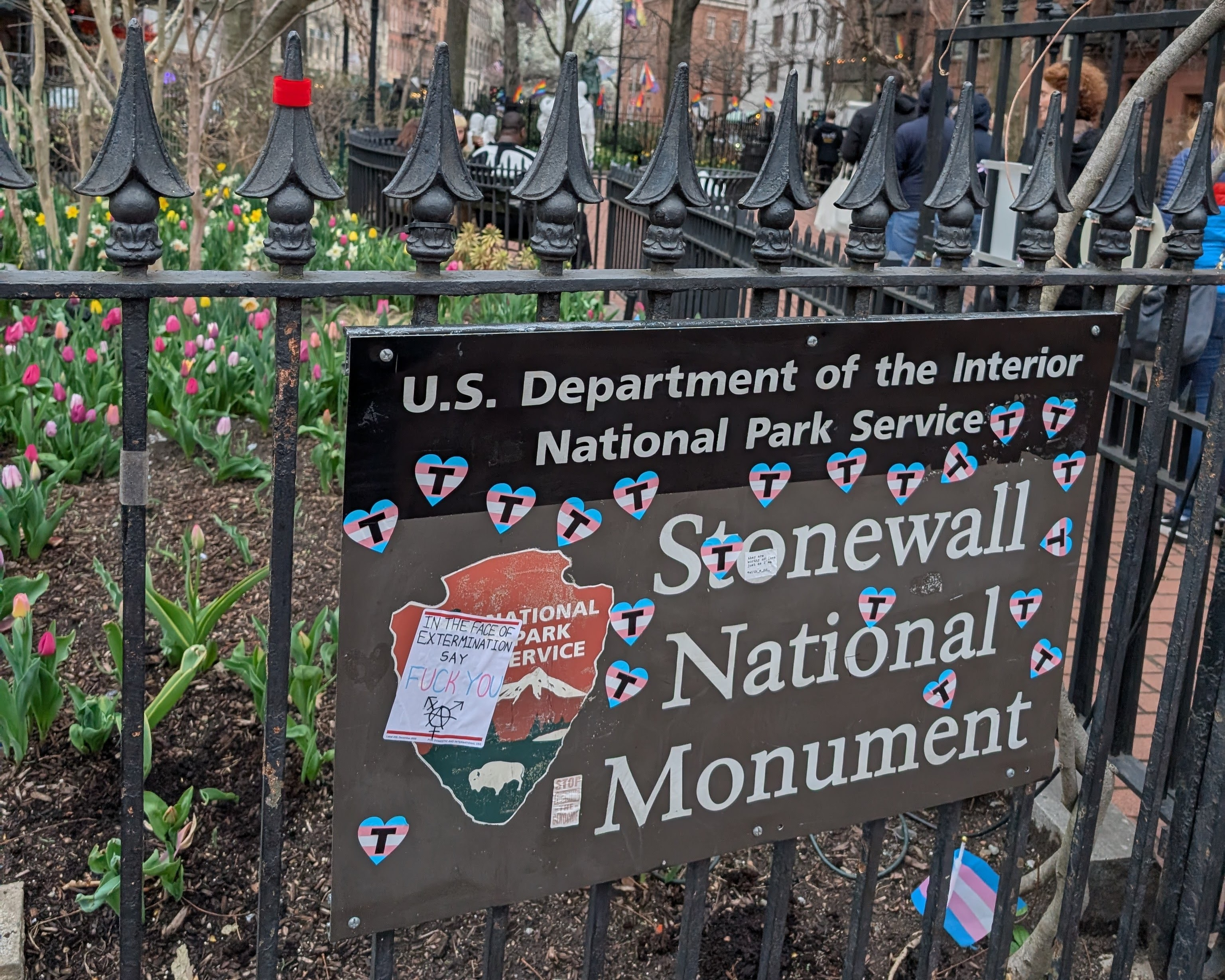
Protests on a sign at the Stonewall National Movement after the removal of references to transgender people on the Monument's website

Originally, the U.S. National Park Service (NPS) website for the monument discussed the transgender and queer communities. U.S. president Donald Trump signed Executive Order 14168 in 2025, mandating that the federal government and federally funded entities cease any promotion of "gender ideology", references to transgender and queer people were removed from the website; the news was first reported on February 13, 2025. The Stonewall Inn Gives Back Initiative and The Stonewall Inn issued a joint statement the same day, saying:

"This blatant act of erasure not only distorts the truth of our history, but it also dishonors the immense contributions of transgender individuals — especially transgender women of color — who were at the forefront of the Stonewall Riots and the broader fight for LGBTQ+ rights."

The statement went on to spotlight Marsha P. Johnson, Sylvia Rivera, and "countless other trans and gender-nonconforming individuals" as "central to the resistance we now celebrate as the foundation of the modern LGBTQ+ rights movement." Rallies were held to protest the erasure of trans and queer history from the Stonewall National Monument website, although New York State's own official LGBTQ Monument on the Hudson River shoreline has deliberately preserved all trans and queer references.

In mid-2025, references to bisexuality were also removed from the NPS website. The term LGB was largely changed to "lesbian and gay", with only two mentions being made to bisexuality compared to the previous eight. SFist described these removals as examples of LGBTQ erasure.

In February 2026, the Trump administration removed the rainbow flag from the monument. Politicians such as Mayor Zohran Mamdani and Manhattan borough president Brad Hoylman-Sigal criticized the move. City officials promised to re-install the rainbow flag, and with other protesters they raised their own rainbow flag with the US flag on the same pole, three days later. In response to a lawsuit from the Gilbert Baker Foundation and other advocacy groups, the Trump administration reversed its position in April 2026 and stipulated that the National Park Service would maintain a rainbow Pride flag at the monument. The National Trust for Historic Preservation listed the location on their 2026 America's 11 Most Endangered Historic Places list due to federal erasure of LGBTQ history.

== See also ==
- Gay Liberation Monument
- Homomonument
- LGBTQ culture in New York City
- List of national monuments of the United States
- NYC Pride March
- Pink Dolphin Monument
- Pink Triangle Park
- Transgender Memorial Garden
- Transgender culture of New York City
