= Palazzo Chupi =

Building in Manhattan, New York

Coordinates: 40°44′07″N 74°00′32″W

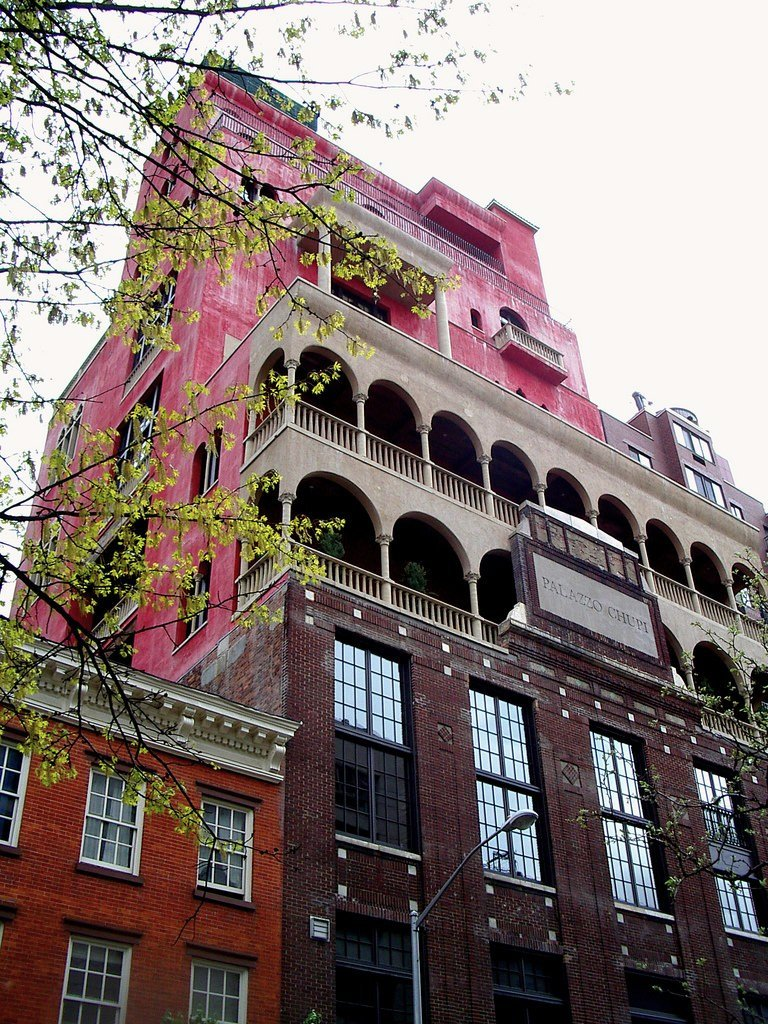
Palazzo Chupi in March 2009

Palazzo Chupi is a residential condominium building in the West Village section of the Greenwich Village neighborhood of Manhattan, New York City. Located at 360 West 11th Street between Washington and West Streets, it was designed by artist Julian Schnabel. The building is designed in the style of a Venetian palazzo, built on top of a former horse stable. Schnabel uses the lower four floors, the former stable, as a studio. They also contain a parking garage, art gallery space and swimming pool.

The building, which contains five "palatial" units, is easy to spot because of its singular style and bold pink color. The name is taken from the trendy Spanish lollipop called "Chupa Chups"; Schnabel used Chupi as a pet name for his second wife Olatz López Garmendia.

Schnabel says that he built the Palazzo "because I wanted more space, and because I thought I could sell two or three apartments to pay for that space, and I built it because I could."

A portion of the building has been converted into a venue for private events.

== Critical response ==
According to a description by Penelope Green in the New York Times, Palazzo Chupi is "[c]inematic and lovely inside, [and] the condo-palazzos float like Citizen Kane's Xanadu high above the remains of the West Village. But Green dismissed the building as a "brand extension for the omnivorous Mr. Schnabel."

Art critic Dodie Kazanjian says that she regards the Palazzo as a "piece of art" by Schnabel. Playwright and novelist Paul Rudnick, who lives across the street, considers the Palazzo to be "In the grand tradition of Manhattan white elephants, which make you wonder, Who lives there, and why? It's already a landmark. And it's much more in the tradition of the West Village, which is supposed to be outrageous and theatrical, than all those glass towers. When the transsexuals left it seems they were reincarnated as real estate... At least the Palazzo does them proud."

But Andrew Berman, executive director of the Greenwich Village Society for Historic Preservation, describes Schnabel's building as "woefully out of context and a monument to this guy's ego." Berman has described the Palazzo Chupi as "an exploded Malibu Barbie house." The building is situated less than a block outside the New York City Landmarks Preservation Commission's Greenwich Village Historic District Extension I, and sits next door to 354 West 11th Street, a well-preserved Greek Revival row house dating from c.1841-42.
