= West Village =

Neighborhood in New York City

Coordinates: 40.736°N 74.004°W

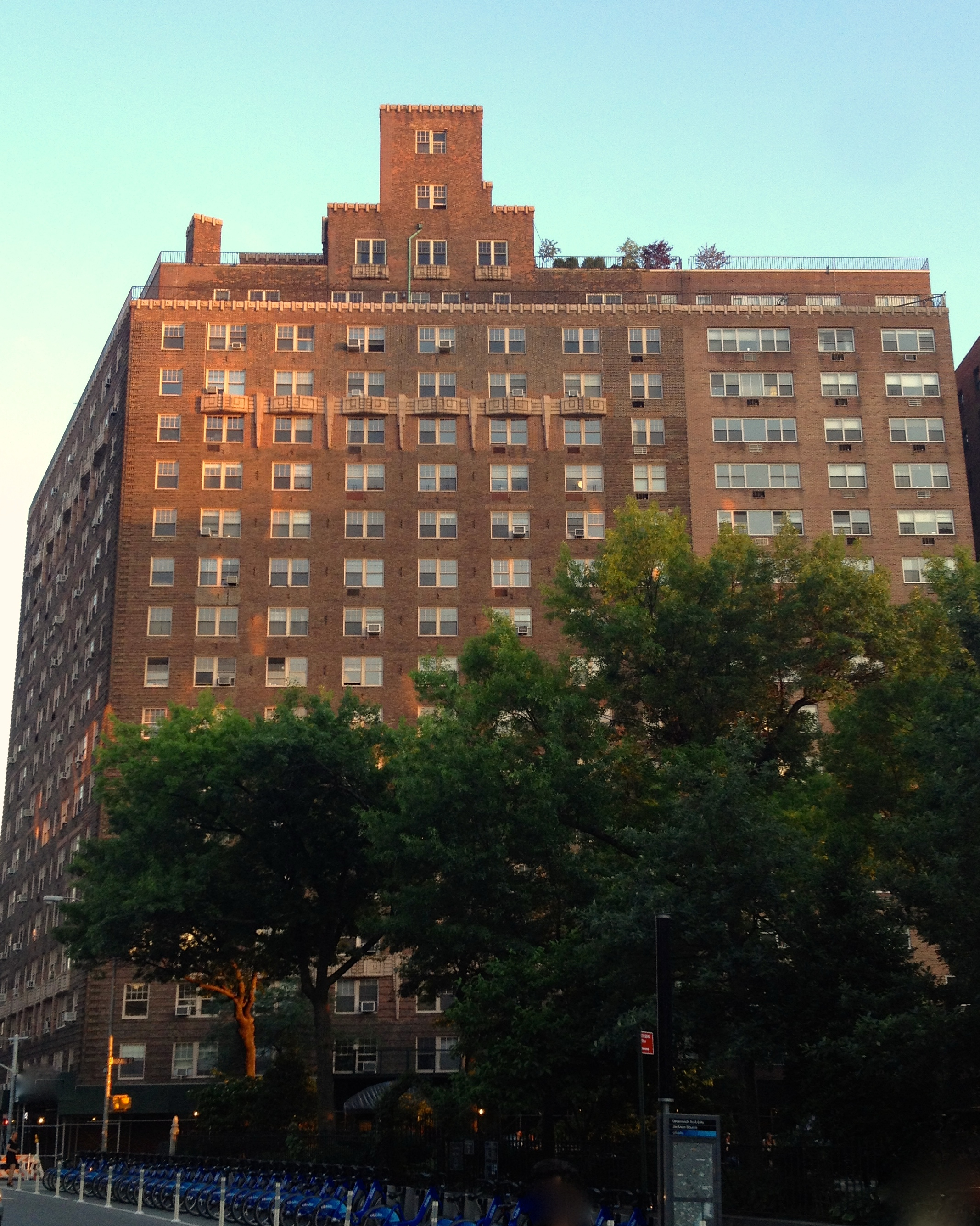
2 Horatio Street in the West Village

Location in New York City

The West Village is a neighborhood in the western section of the larger Greenwich Village neighborhood of Lower Manhattan in New York City. The West Village is bounded by the Hudson River to the west and 14th Street to the north. The eastern boundary is variously cited as Greenwich Avenue, Seventh Avenue, or Sixth Avenue, while the southern boundary is either Houston Street or Christopher Street.

The West Village is part of Manhattan Community District 2, and is patrolled by the 6th Precinct of the New York City Police Department. Residential property sale prices in the West Village are among the most expensive in the United States, typically exceeding US$2,100 per square foot ($23,000/m^{2}) in 2017.

== History ==
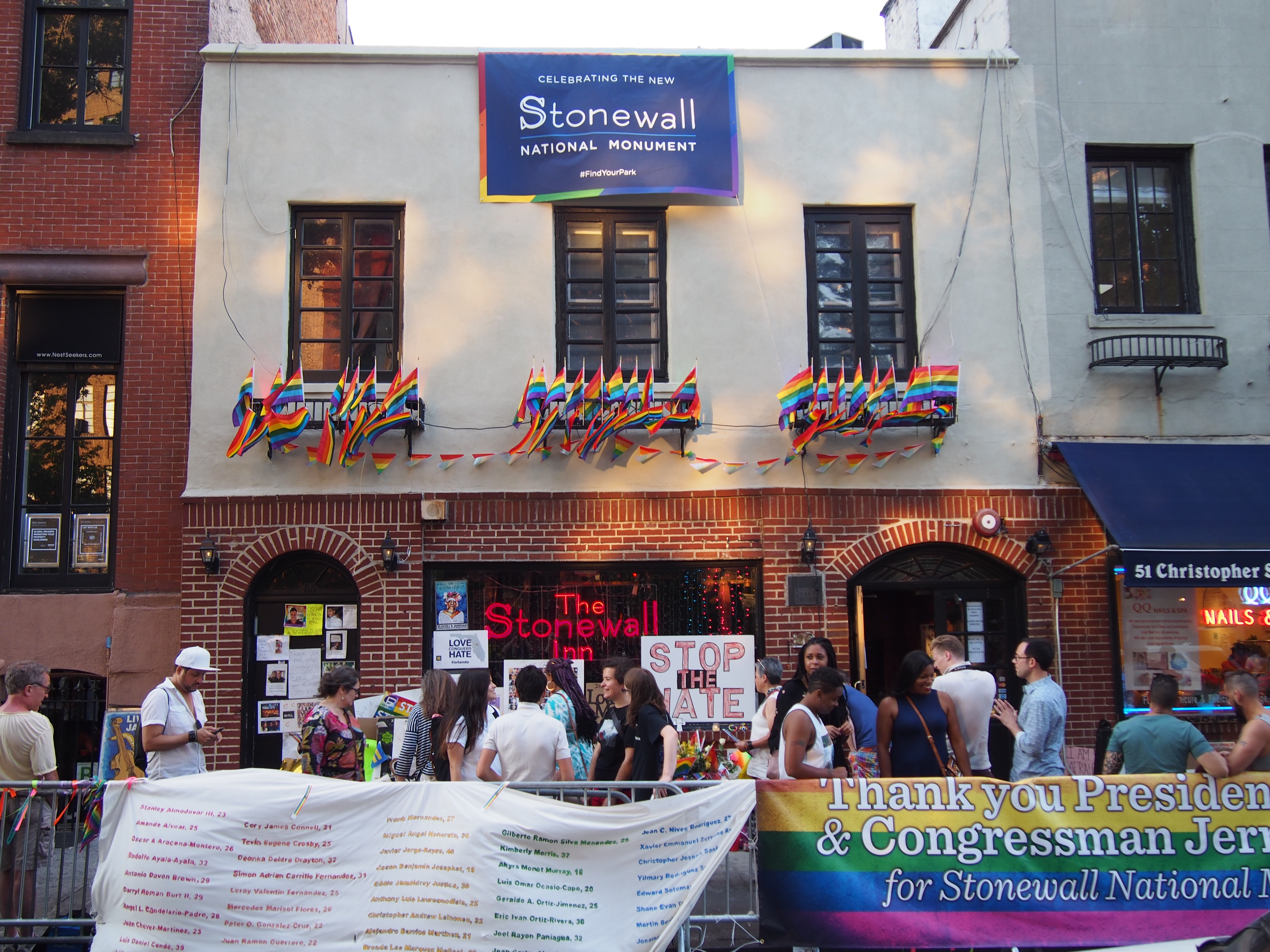
The Stonewall Inn at 53 Christopher Street, a designated U.S. National Historic Landmark and National Monument, as the site of the 1969 Stonewall Riots.

The designation "West Village" emerged amidst successful preservation efforts in the 1950s–1960s. Residents and preservationists began using the designation "West Village" to distinguish this section of Greenwich Village from the portion of the Village east of Seventh Avenue surrounding Washington Square Park and New York University, where developers found more success in the redevelopment and demolition of historic blocks.

Other names have been given to portions of the area as changes have come to the neighborhood. For instance, beginning in the early 1980s, residential development spread in the Far West Village between West Street and Hudson Street, from West 14th Street to West Houston Street, resulting in the area being given its own name.

=== Preservation ===
Historically, local residents and preservation groups have been concerned about development in the Village and have fought to preserve the architectural and historic integrity of the neighborhood. More than 50 blocks, bordering 14th Street to the north, comprise a historic district established by the New York City Landmarks Preservation Commission. The historic district's convoluted borders run no farther south than 4th Street or St. Luke's Place, and no farther east than Washington Square East or University Place. Redevelopment in this area is severely restricted, and developers must preserve the main facade and aesthetics of the buildings, even during renovation. This district—which was for four decades the city's largest—was created in 1969 by the then-four-year-old New York City Landmarks Preservation Commission. However, preservationists advocated for the entire neighborhood to be designated a historic district; although it covers most of the West Village, the blocks closest to the Hudson River are excluded.

Advocates continued to pursue their goal of additional designation, spurred in particular by the increased pace of development in the 1990s. The Greenwich Village Society for Historic Preservation (GVSHP), a nonprofit organization dedicated to the architectural and cultural character and heritage of the neighborhood, successfully proposed new districts and individual landmarks to the LPC. Those include:

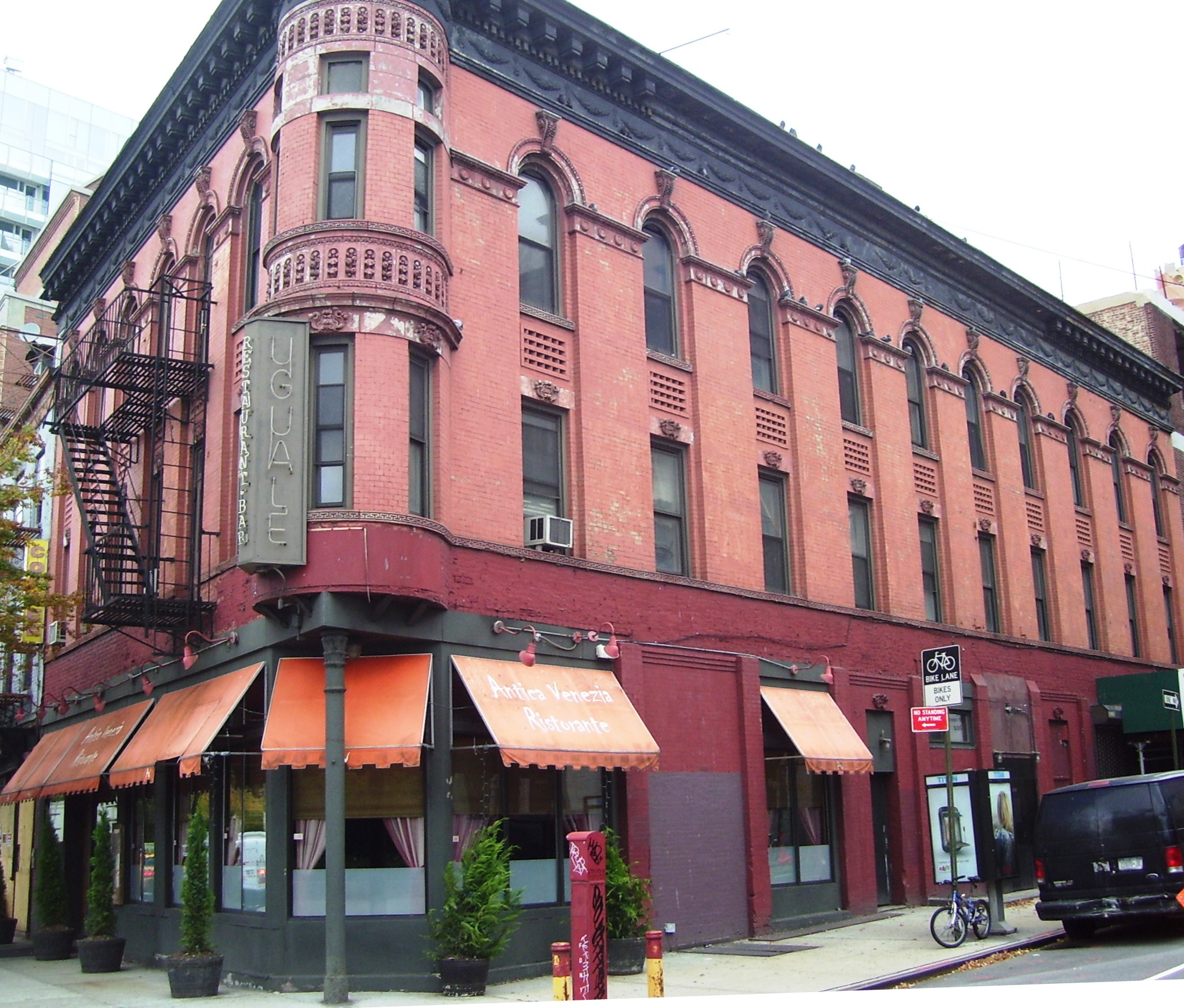
396–397 West Street at West 10th Street is a former hotel which dates from 1904, and is part of the Weehawken Street Historic District

- Gansevoort Market Historic District was the first new historic district in Greenwich Village in 34 years. The 112 buildings on 11 blocks protect the city's distinctive Meatpacking District with its cobblestone streets, warehouses and rowhouses. About 70 percent of the area proposed by GVSHP in 2000 was designated a historic district by the LPC in 2003, while the entire area was listed on the State and National Registers of Historic Places in 2007.
- Weehawken Street Historic District, designated in 2006, is a 14-building, three-block district near the Hudson River centering on tiny Weehawken Street and containing an array of architecture including a sailor's hotel, former stables, and a wooden house.
- Greenwich Village Historic District Extension I, designated in 2006, brought 46 more buildings on three blocks into the district, thus protecting warehouses, a former public school and police station, and early 19th-century rowhouses. Both the Weehawken Street Historic District and the Greenwich Village Historic District Extension I were designated by the LPC in response to the larger proposal for a Far West Village Historic District submitted by GVSHP in 2004. The Landmarks Preservation Commission also designated as landmarks several individual sites proposed by the Greenwich Village Society for Historic Preservation, including the former Bell Telephone Labs Complex (1861–1963), now Westbeth Artists Community, designated in 2011; and houses at 159 Charles Street and 354 W. 11th Street, as well as the Keller Hotel, all in 2007.

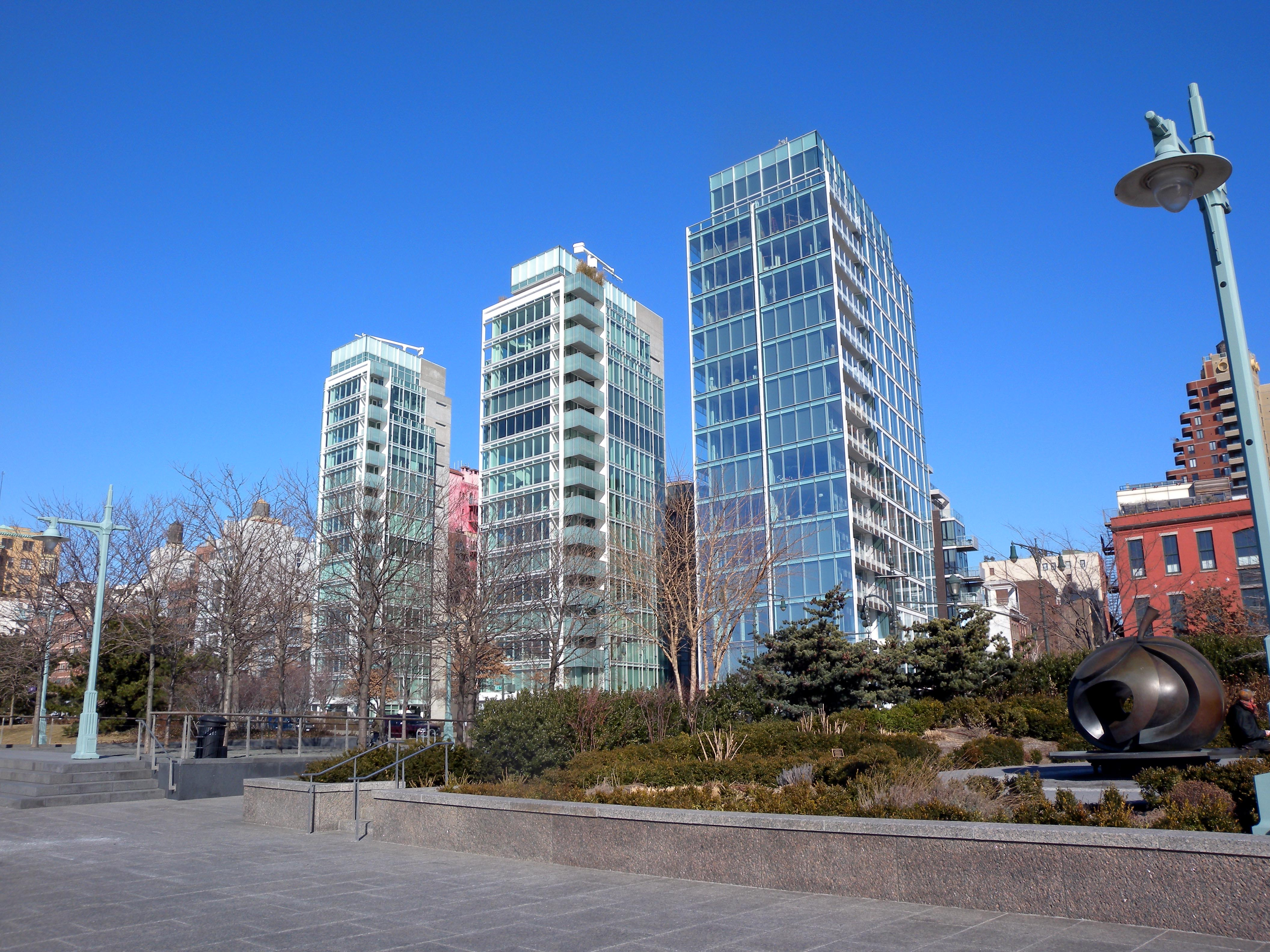
173 and 176 Perry Street

In addition, several contextual rezonings were enacted in Greenwich Village in recent years to limit the size and height of allowable new development in the neighborhood, and to encourage the preservation of existing buildings. The following were proposed by the GVSHP and passed by the City Planning Commission:

- Far West Village Rezoning, approved in 2005, was the first downzoning in Manhattan in many years, putting in place new height caps, thus ending construction of high-rise waterfront towers in much of the Village and encouraging the reuse of existing buildings.
- Washington and Greenwich Street Rezoning, approved in 2010, was passed in near-record time to protect six blocks from out-of-scale hotel development and maintain the low-rise character.

=== Reputation as urban bohemia ===
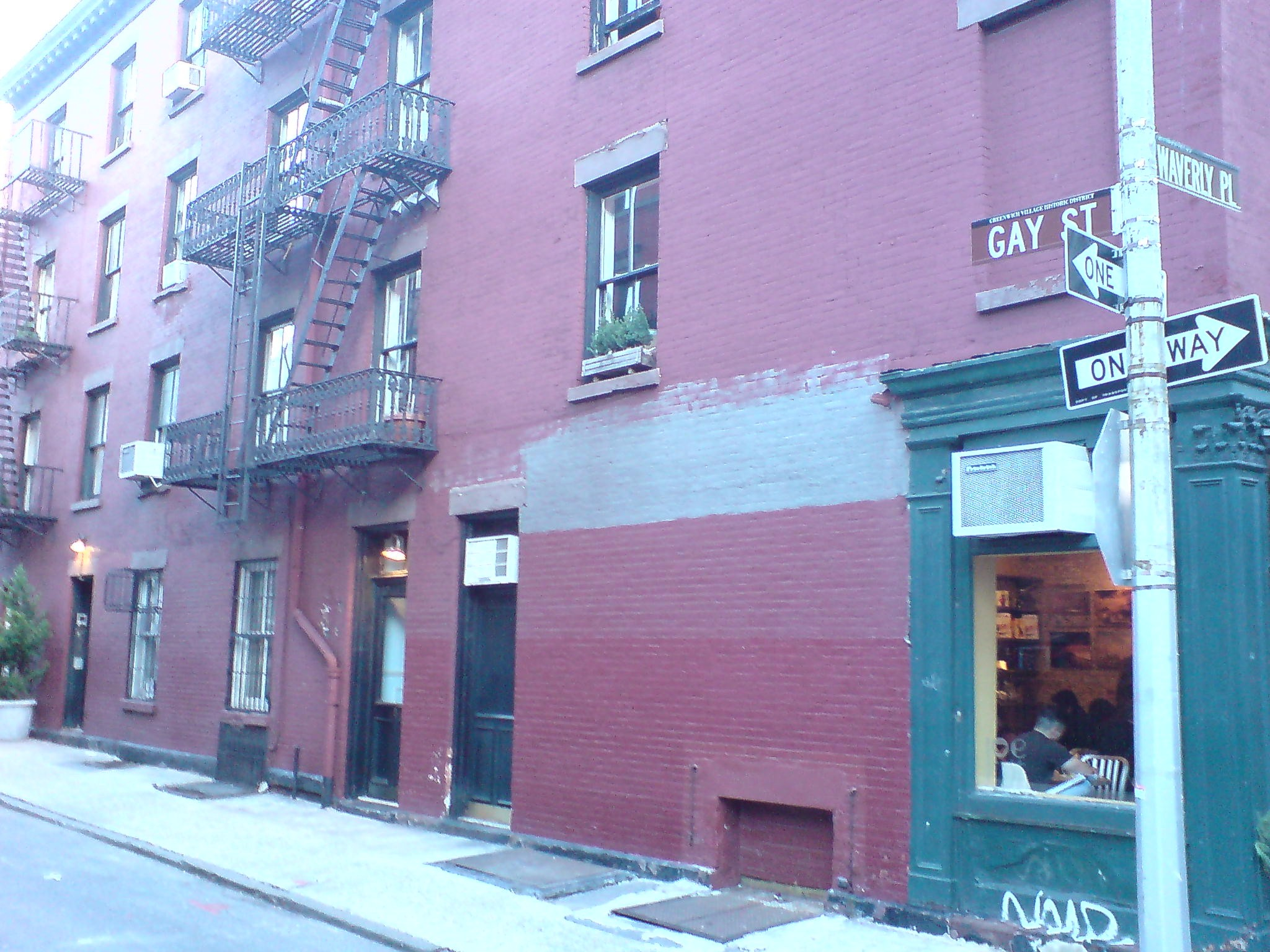
Gay Street at the corner of Waverly Place

The West Village historically was known as an important landmark on the map of American bohemian culture in the early and mid-twentieth century. The neighborhood was known for its colorful, artistic residents and the alternative culture they propagated. Due in part to the progressive attitudes of many of its residents, the Village was a focal point of new movements and ideas, whether political, artistic, or cultural. This tradition as an enclave of avant-garde and alternative culture was established during the 19th century and into the 20th century, when small presses, art galleries, and experimental theater thrived. Known as "Little Bohemia" starting in 1916, West Village is in some ways the center of the bohemian lifestyle on the West Side, with classic artists' lofts in the form of the Westbeth Artists Community and Julian Schnabel's Palazzo Chupi.

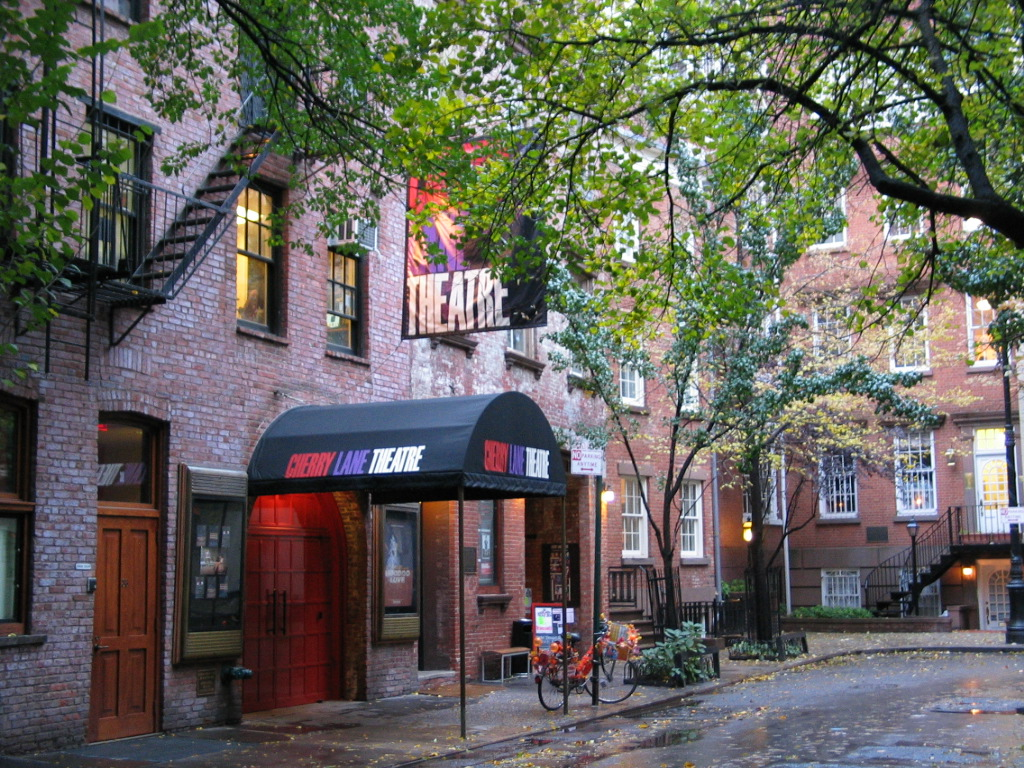
The Cherry Lane Theatre is located in the West Village.

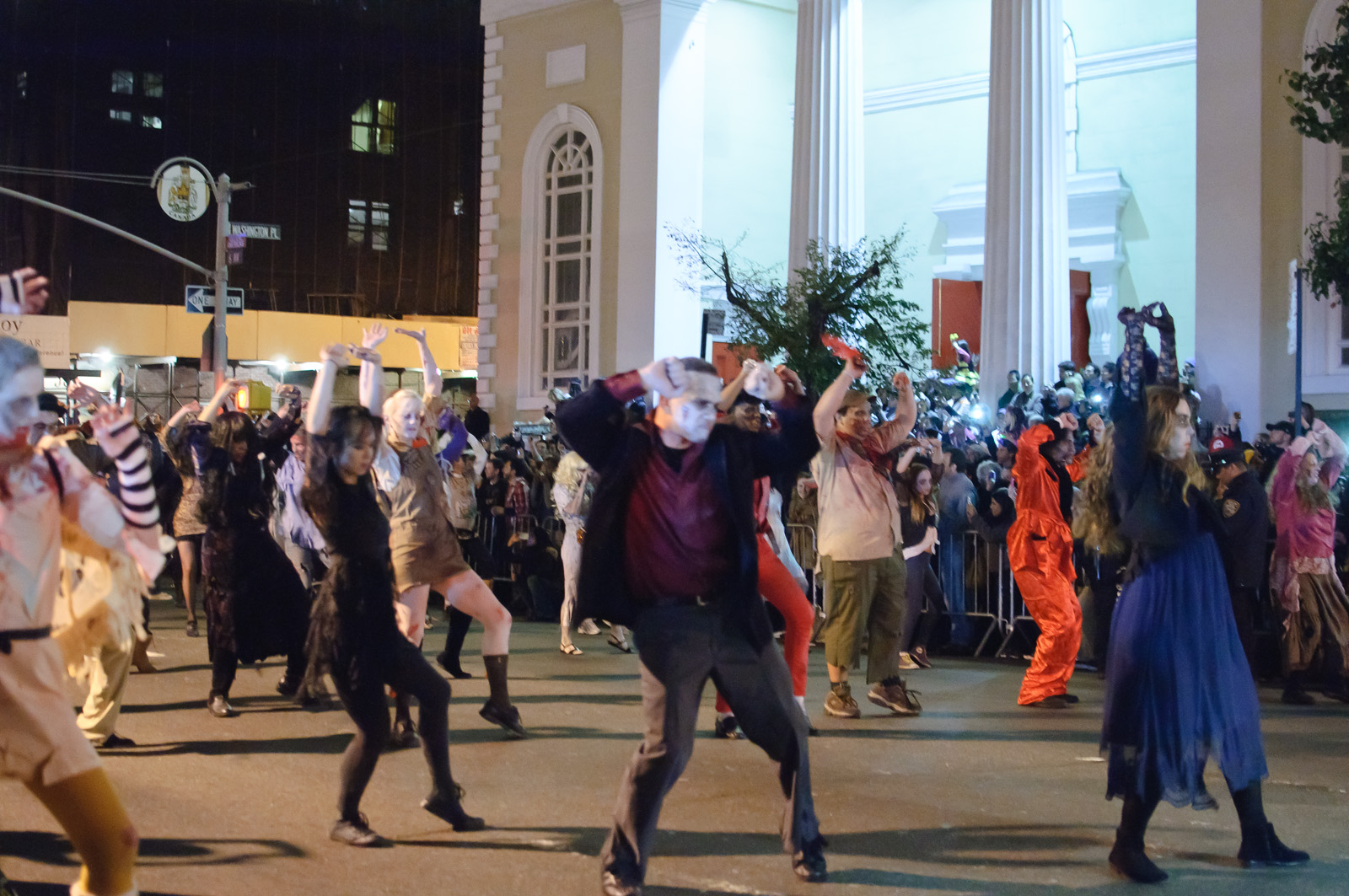
The annual Greenwich Village Halloween Parade is the world's largest Halloween parade and takes place in the West Village.

In 1924, the Cherry Lane Theatre was established at 38 Commerce Street. It is New York City's oldest continuously running Off-Broadway theater. A landmark in Greenwich Village's cultural landscape, it was built as a farm silo in 1817, and also served as a tobacco warehouse and box factory before Edna St. Vincent Millay and other members of the Provincetown Players converted the structure into a theatre they christened the Cherry Lane Playhouse, which opened on March 24, 1924, with the play The Man Who Ate the Popomack. During the 1940s The Living Theatre, Theatre of the Absurd, and the Downtown Theater movement all took root there, and it developed a reputation as a place where aspiring playwrights and emerging voices could showcase their work.

On January 8, 1947, stevedore Andy Hintz was fatally shot by hitmen John M. Dunn, Andrew Sheridan and Danny Gentile in front of his apartment on Grove Street. Before he died on January 29, he told his wife that "Johnny Dunn shot me." The three gunmen were immediately arrested. Sheridan and Dunn were executed.

The Village hosted the first racially integrated night club in the United States, when Café Society was opened in 1938 at 1 Sheridan Square by Barney Josephson. Café Society showcased African American talent and was intended to be an American version of the political cabarets Josephson had seen in Europe before World War I. Notable performers there included among others: Pearl Bailey, Count Basie, Nat King Cole, John Coltrane, Miles Davis, Ella Fitzgerald, Coleman Hawkins, Billie Holiday, Lena Horne, Burl Ives, Lead Belly, Anita O'Day, Charlie Parker, Les Paul and Mary Ford, Paul Robeson, Kay Starr, Art Tatum, Sarah Vaughan, Dinah Washington, Josh White, Teddy Wilson, Lester Young, and The Weavers, who also in Christmas 1949, played at the Village Vanguard.

The annual Greenwich Village Halloween Parade, initiated in 1974 by Greenwich Village puppeteer and mask maker Ralph Lee, is the world's largest Halloween parade and America's only major nighttime parade, attracting more than 60,000 costumed participants, 2 million in-person spectators, and a worldwide television audience of over 100 million.

== Geography ==
=== Boundaries ===
The traditional boundaries of the West Village are the Hudson River to the west, West 14th Street to the north, Greenwich Avenue to the east, and Christopher Street to the south. Other popular definitions have extended the southern boundary as far south as Houston Street, and some use Seventh Avenue or Avenue of the Americas as the eastern boundary. The Far West Village extends from the Hudson River to Hudson Street, between Gansevoort Street and Leroy Street. (Note: There is some ambiguity in the boundaries of the Far West Village, due to variations in block-by-block character – some exclude the 3 north-south blocks from Morton Street (north) to Houston Street (south), and some include the 2 blocks from Hudson Street (west) to Bleecker Street (east) between Bank Street (north) and Christopher Street (south).) Neighboring communities include Chelsea to the north, the South Village and Hudson Square to the south, and the Washington Square neighborhood of Greenwich Village to the east.

=== Street grid ===
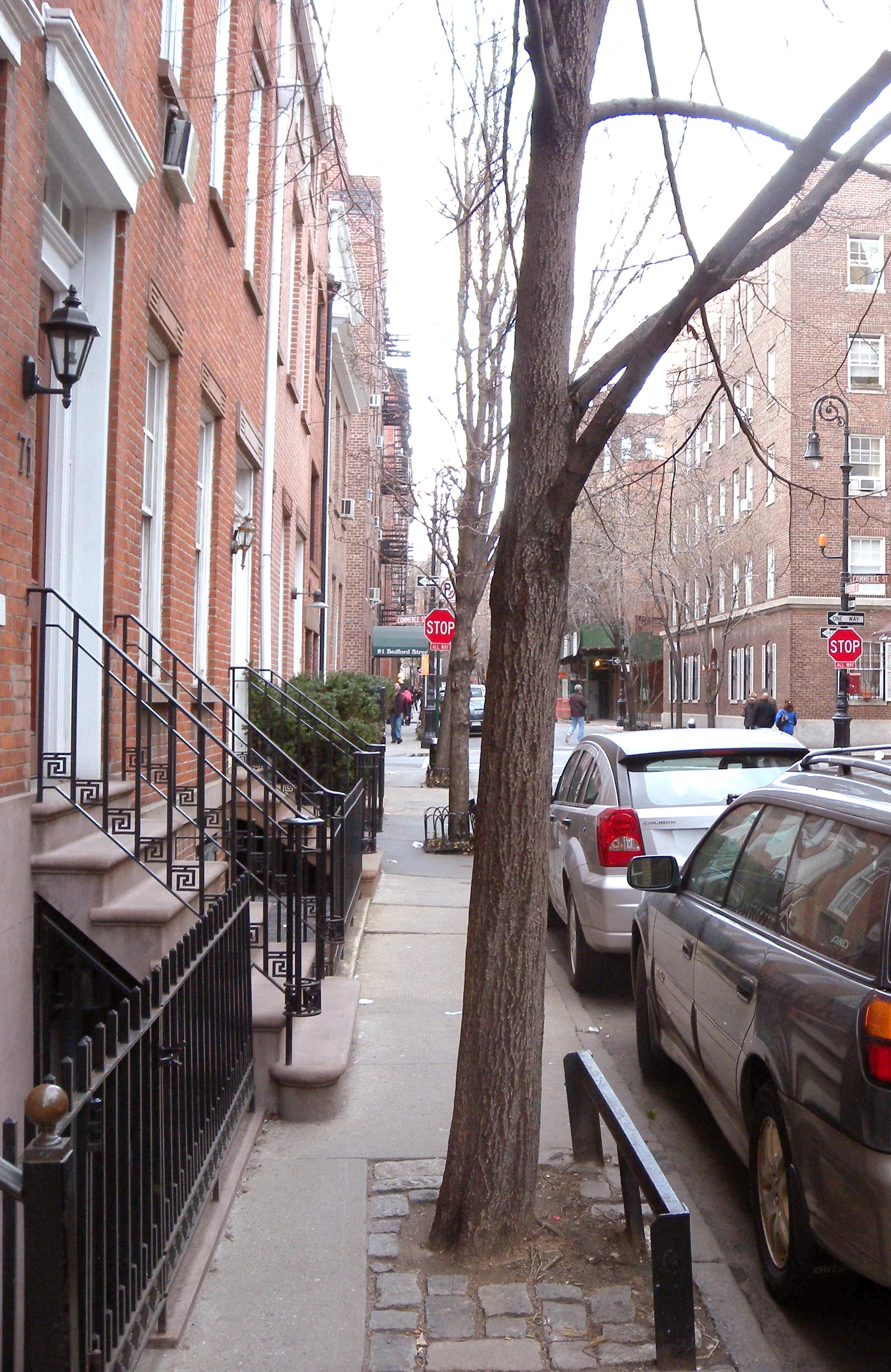
Bedford Street

The neighborhood is distinguished by streets that are "off the grid", being set at an angle to the other streets in Manhattan. These roads were laid out in an 18th-century grid plan, approximately parallel or perpendicular to the Hudson, long before the Commissioners' Plan of 1811 which created the main street grid plan for later parts of the city. Even streets that were given numbers in the 19th century to make them nominally part of the grid can be idiosyncratic, at best. West 4th Street, formerly Asylum Street, crosses West 10th, 11th and 12th Streets, ending at an intersection with West 13th Street. Heading north on Greenwich Street, West 12th Street is separated by three blocks from Little West 12th Street, which in turn is one block south of West 13th Street. Further, some of the smaller east–west residential streets are paved with setts (often confused with cobblestones), particularly in Far West Village and the Meatpacking District.

This grid is prevalent through the rest of Greenwich Village as well.

== Demographics ==
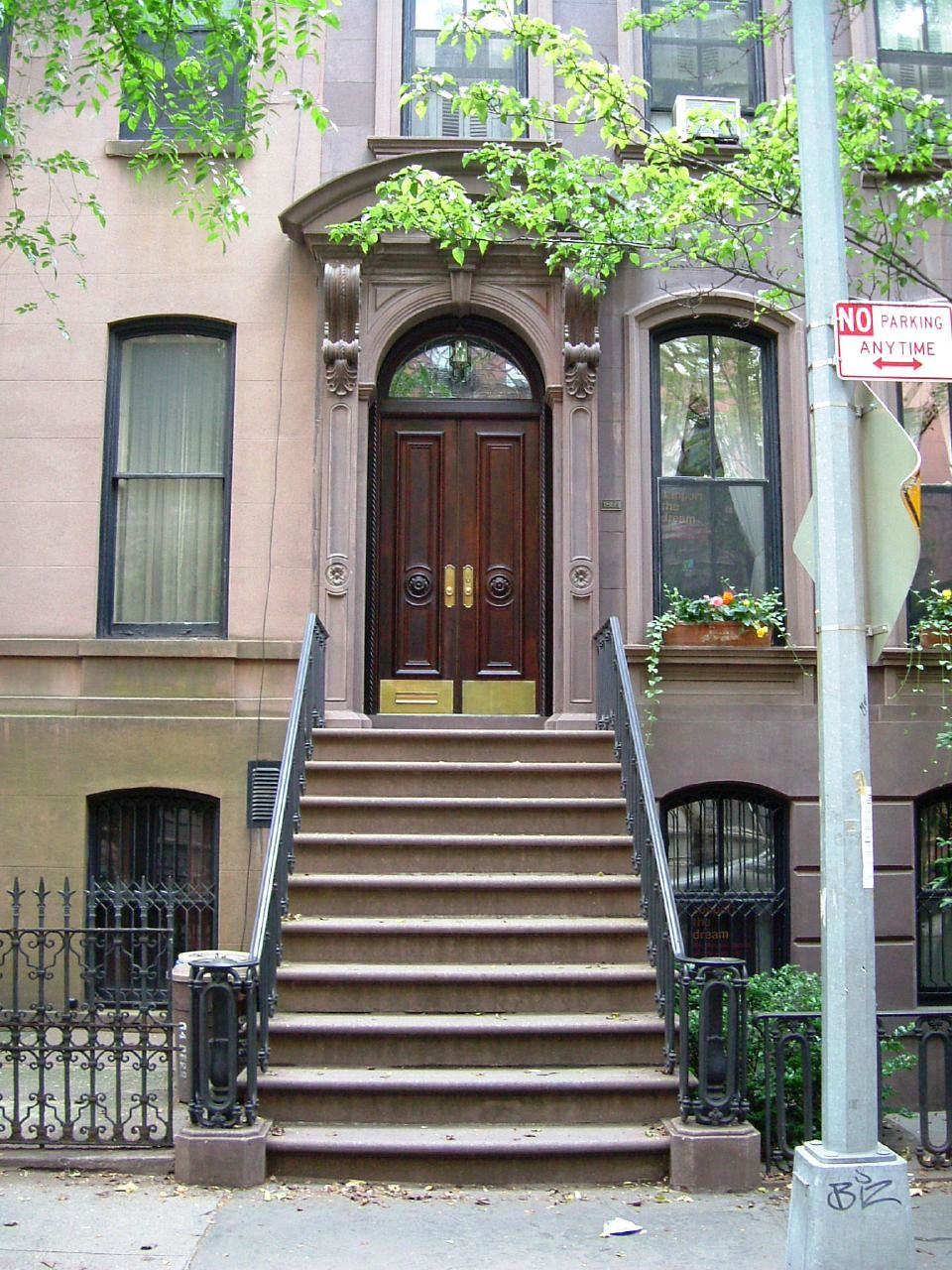
66 Perry Street was featured in Sex and the City as Carrie Bradshaw's house.

Based on data from the 2010 United States census, the population of the West Village neighborhood tabulation area was 66,880, a change of −1,603 (−2.4%) from the 68,483 counted in 2000. Covering an area of 583.47 acres (236.12 ha), the neighborhood had a population density of 114.6 inhabitants per acre (73,300/sq mi; 28,300/km^{2}). The racial makeup of the neighborhood was 80.9% (54,100) White, 2% (1,353) African American, 0.1% (50) Native American, 8.2% (5,453) Asian, 0% (20) Pacific Islander, 0.4% (236) from other races, and 2.4% (1,614) from two or more races. Hispanic or Latino of any race were 6.1% (4,054) of the population.

The approximate residential population in the West Village is 34,000 people based on seven 2010 Census Tracts for Manhattan Community District 2. Some population characteristics include:

- 10% of the population in the West Village is less than 20 years old (27% of population of entire US is less than 20 years old)
- 45% of the population in the West Village is 20–39 years old (versus 27% in entire US)
- Females aged 20–39 make up 25% of the population in the West Village (13% of population in entire US) Females aged 20–29 make up 14% of the population in the West Village versus 7% in the entire US. Females in the West Village represent 52% of the population versus 51% in all of the US.
- 80% of the population was born in the US (87% in entire US)
- Average household income by census tract was $180,000 (compared to $51,000 average household income by state for entire US)

A study by NYU estimated that 8,000 workers commute to the West Village during the workweek.

About 13,000 out-of-town visitors also visit the neighborhood daily. A portion of these approximately 139,452 domestic and international visitors that enter the city daily visit or stay in the West Village; an average of 11,000 people visit the High Line every day.

== Law enforcement ==
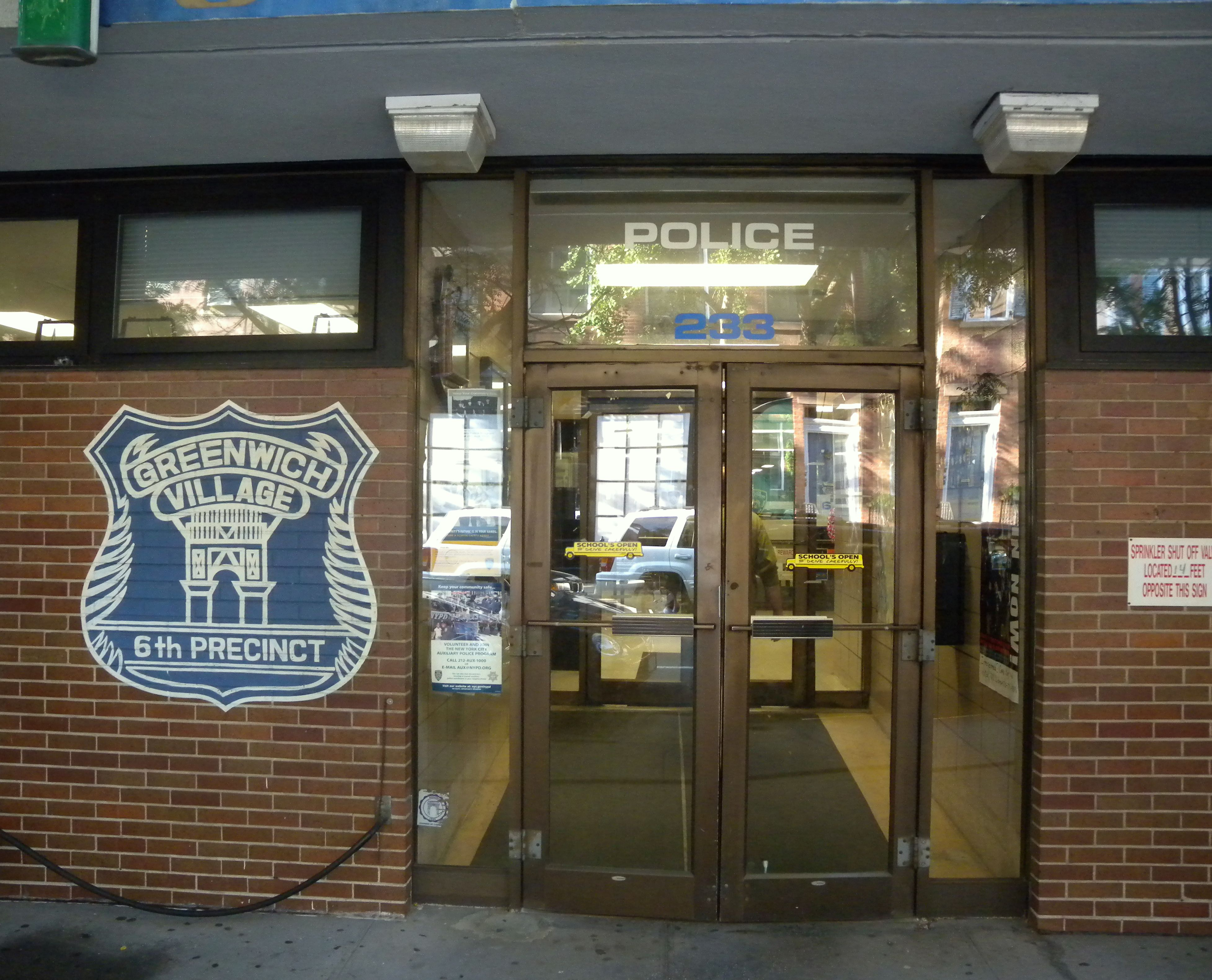
NYPD 6th Precinct

The West Village is patrolled by the 6th Precinct of the NYPD, located at 233 West 10th Street. The 6th Precinct ranked 68th safest out of 69 patrol areas for per-capita crime in 2010. This is due to a high incidence of property crime.

The 6th Precinct has a lower crime rate than in the 1990s, with crimes across all categories having decreased by 80.6% between 1990 and 2018. The precinct reported 1 murder, 20 rapes, 153 robberies, 121 felony assaults, 163 burglaries, 1,031 grand larcenies, and 28 grand larcenies auto in 2018.

The Meatpacking District at the north end of this neighborhood, also known as the "Gansevoort Historic District", is filled with trendy boutiques and nightclubs. It is also the area's most concentrated site of grand larceny. (Grand larceny in New York is legally defined as stealing property worth $1,000 or more or property taken from the person of another without the threat of force.) In February 2013 the NYPD passed out 3,500 fliers to bars and clubs in the Sixth Precinct warning people to guard their valuables, especially at district's clubs, due to the rise in grand larceny rates. Police have said these crimes mostly happen in the Meatpacking District from 11 p.m. to 3 a.m.

== Fire safety ==
The West Village is served by two New York City Fire Department (FDNY) fire stations:

- Engine Company 24/Ladder Company 5/Battalion 2 – 227 6th Avenue
- Squad 18 – 132 West 10th Street

== Post office and ZIP Codes ==
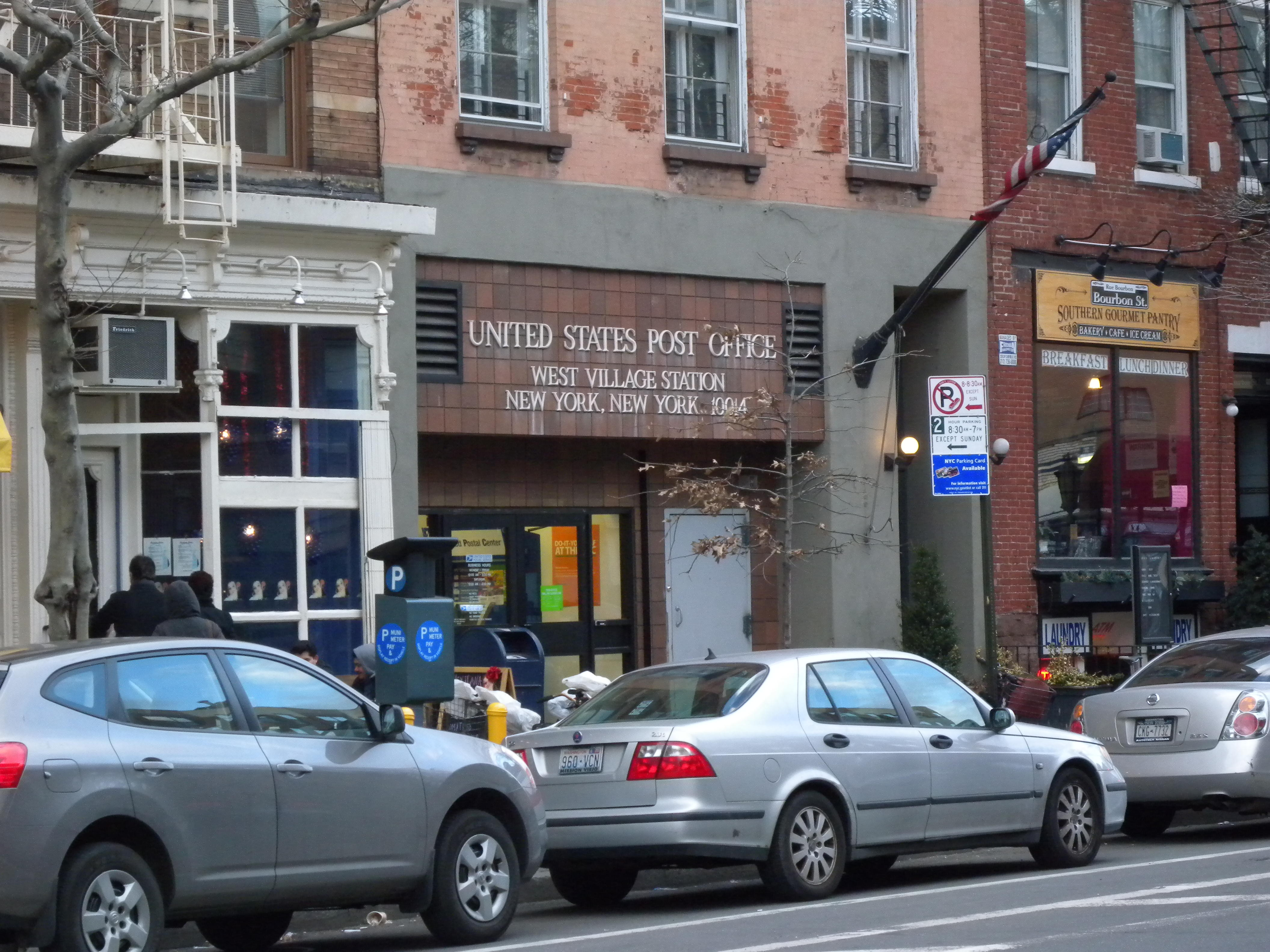
West Village Post Office

The West Village includes two ZIP Codes. Most of the West Village, south of Greenwich Avenue and west of Sixth Avenue, is located in 10014, while the northern section north of Greenwich Avenue is in 10011. The United States Postal Service operates the West Village Station at 527 Hudson Street.

== Education ==
=== Schools ===
There are two zoned elementary schools nearby: PS 3 Melser Charrette School, and PS 41 Greenwich Village School. Residents are zoned to Baruch Middle School 104. Greenwich Village High School was a private high school formerly located in the area, but later moved to SoHo. In 2017, Middle School 297 opened at 75 Morton Street.

=== Libraries ===
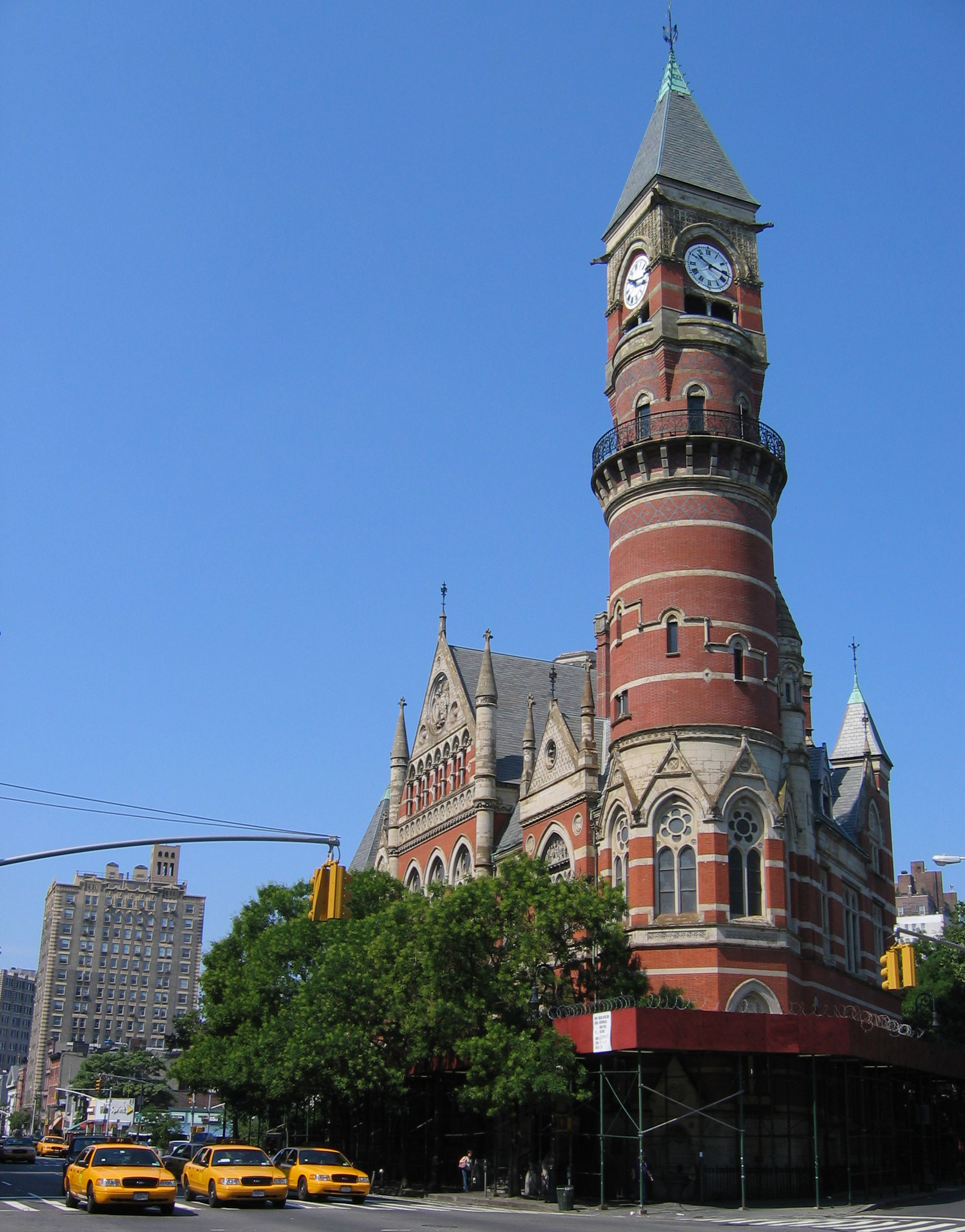
Jefferson Market Library, once a courthouse, now a branch of the New York Public Library

The New York Public Library (NYPL) operates two branches near the West Village. The Jefferson Market Library is located at 425 Avenue of the Americas (Sixth Avenue). The building was a courthouse in the 19th and 20th centuries before being converted into a library in 1967, and it is now a city designated landmark. The Hudson Park branch is located at 66 Leroy Street. The branch is housed in Carnegie library that was built in 1906 and expanded in 1920.

== Transportation ==
The area is served by the MTA Regional Bus Operations' M8, M11, M12, M14A, M20, M55 routes and the following New York City Subway stations:

- 14th Street–Eighth Avenue at Eighth Avenue; serving the A, C, E, and L trains
- West Fourth Street–Washington Square at Sixth Avenue; serving the A, B, C, D, E, F, <F>, and M trains
- 14th Street at Seventh Avenue; serving the 1, 2, and 3 trains
- Christopher Street–Sheridan Square at Seventh Avenue; serving the 1 and 2 trains
- Houston Street at Varick Street; serving the 1 and 2 trains

The West Village is also served by the PATH at Christopher Street and Ninth Street.

The Citi Bike bike share program launched in the area in May 2013.

In addition, the West Side Highway (NY 9A) runs along the western edge the Village.

== Points of interest ==
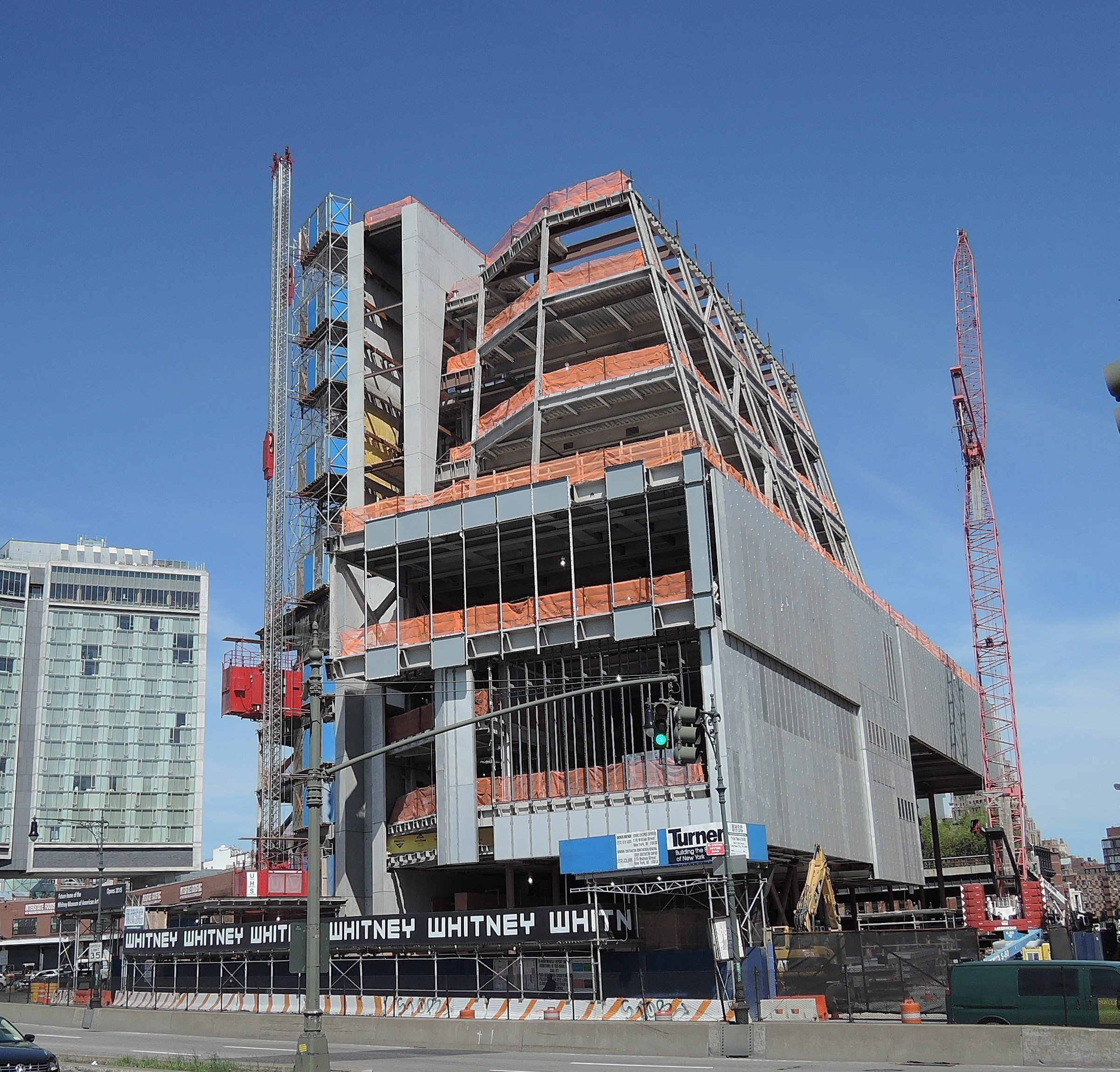
Whitney Museum of American Art under construction in 2013

- Casa Magazines is a corner shop at 8th Avenue and 12th Street that sells more than 2,500 titles. It has been called New York City's "magazine Mecca" and Mohammed Ahmed, who ran the shop from 1994 to 2024, was dubbed by The New York Times as "the last king of print".
- Jefferson Market Branch of the New York Public Library is at 425 Sixth Avenue, corner of West 10th Street. It was built as a courthouse from 1874 to 1877, and was designed by architect Frederick Clarke Withers of the firm of Vaux and Withers. It was turned into a library after public outcry over its planned demolition in 1958.
- High Line, now a public park, connects the historic district to Chelsea, Hell's Kitchen, and the Hudson Yards Redevelopment Project. The elevated train tracks, mostly running parallel to Tenth Avenue, have been converted to an open greenway. The tracks, abandoned in 1980, once served the businesses in the area; the park opened in 2009.
- Hudson River Park, running from 59th Street to the Battery including most of associated piers, is being transformed into a joint city/state park with non-traditional uses.
- St. Luke in the Fields Church is an Episcopal church founded in 1820 on farmland donated by Trinity Church.
- Stonewall Inn is a gay tavern and recreational bar. It is most famous as the site of the Stonewall riots of 1969, which is widely considered to be the single most important event leading to the gay liberation movement and the modern fight for gay and lesbian rights in the United States. The surrounding area is designated as the Stonewall National Monument.
- Village Vanguard is a jazz club opened on February 22, 1935, by Max Gordon. At first, it featured many forms of music, such as folk music and beat poetry, but it switched to an all-jazz format in 1957.
- Westbeth Artists Community is a nonprofit housing and commercial complex dedicated to providing affordable living and working space for artists and arts organizations. The complex is named for two of the streets that border it—West and Bethune.
- Whitney Museum of American Art is located in the West Village. The Whitney was founded in 1931 by Gertrude Vanderbilt Whitney, a wealthy and prominent American socialite and art patron. Its permanent collection comprises more than 21,000 works. From 1966 to 2014, the Whitney was located on the Upper East Side; it closed in October 2014 to relocate to a new building in the Meatpacking District/West Village, which opened in May 2015.

== Notable people ==
Costas Kondylis's 1 Morton Square residential development (on Morton and West Street, completed in 2004) is the residence of actresses-turned-designers Mary-Kate and Ashley Olsen and of actor Daniel Radcliffe. Richard Meier's towers at 173 Perry Street, 176 Perry Street, and 165 Charles Street are home to actors Jim Carrey, Hugh Jackman, and Nicole Kidman. Other notable actors who formerly lived or currently reside in the neighborhood include Richard Armitage, Matthew Broderick, Scarlett Johansson, Ray Romano, Jason Biggs, Ryan Eggold, Andy Samberg, Claire Danes, Hugh Dancy, Will Ferrell, Jill Hennessy, Seth Meyers, Julianne Moore, Sarah Jessica Parker, Brooke Shields, Liv Tyler, Saoirse Ronan, Karlie Kloss, and musician/actor Richard Barone. Ramsey Clark, Attorney General under Lyndon B. Johnson, activist and founder of the International Action Center, lived here as well. Michael Riedel, the broadcaster and theater writer, has been a resident for over 20 years. Raul Zamudio, curator and critic, lives and works at an exhibition space on Jane St. Famed neurologist and author Oliver Sacks lived in the West Village (and also had his office there as well) from the mid-1990s until his death in 2015.
