= Casa Magazines =

Newsstand in New York City

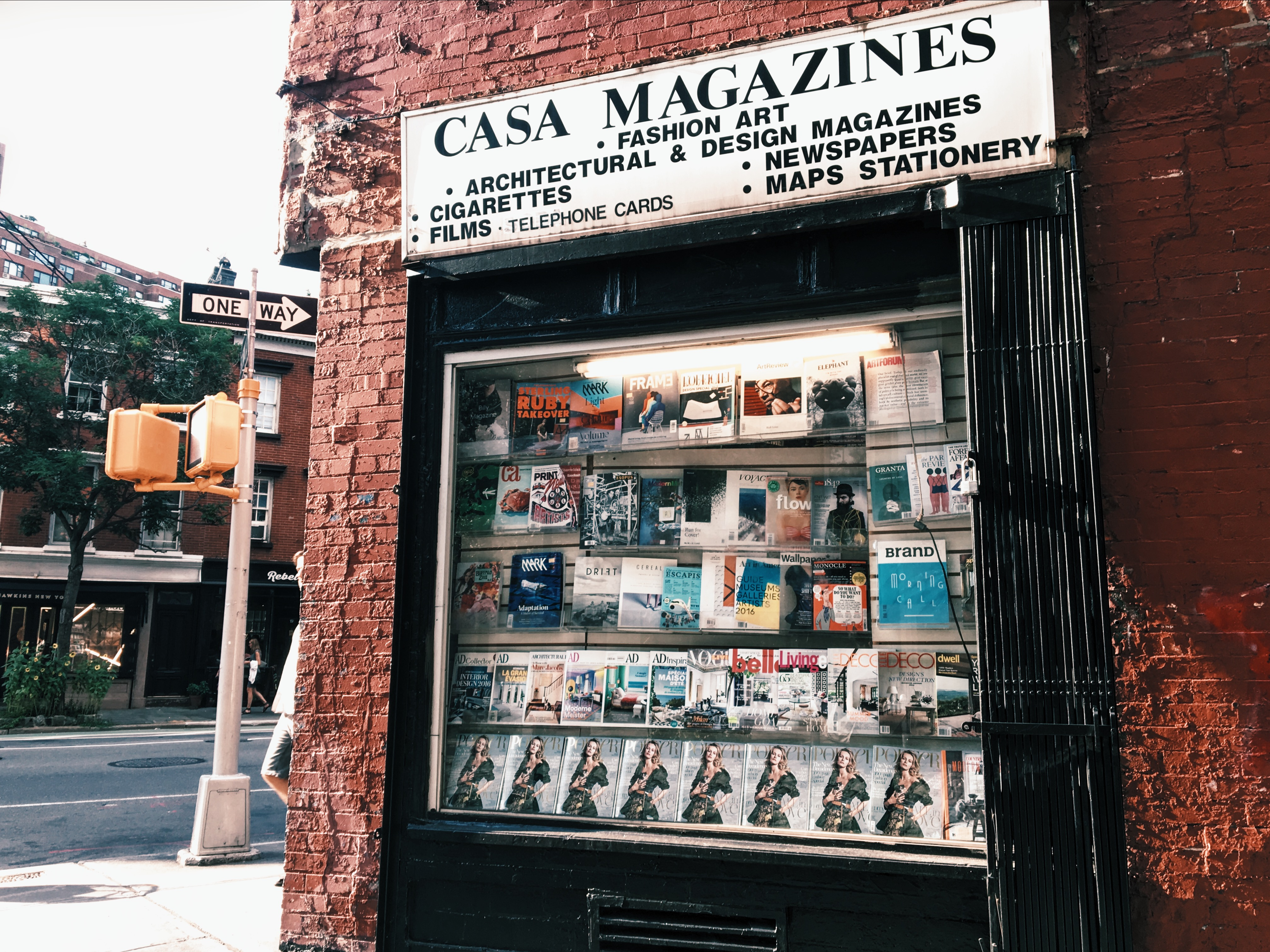
- Casa Magazines, New York (August 2016)
- Industry: Newsstand
- Founded: 1970s
- Headquarters: 22 8th Avenue, New York City, United States
- Number of locations: 1
- Area served: New York City
- Owner: Hemal Sheth

Casa Magazines is a corner shop, located at 8th Avenue and 12th Street in the West Village, Manhattan. It is known for selling international fashion and design publications in print format among the more than 2,000 titles it carries.

The newsstand has been dubbed New York City's “magazine Mecca” and has been profiled in major media outlets due to its continued operation in spite of the decline of newspapers and other print media along with the store's survival during the COVID-19 recession in the United States.

== History ==
In 1994, Casa Magazines was purchased by Mohammed Ahmed, who has been dubbed as "the last king of print" by The New York Times. He is assisted by Ali Wasim, who has been working with Casa since 1995. A customer has described the shop to the New York Times as "It feels like a grown-up Sesame Street."

The shop had been open daily for 26 years until the beginning of the COVID-19 pandemic in 2020, when it had to close temporarily. The neighborhood set up a GoFundMe to support the owner and staff.

In 2021, Casa Magazines collaborated with shoemaker Vans on a special pair of sneakers. The shoes featured a white background with the names of products sold by the store, along with other details. This project came about after the newsstand was nominated by Nicolas Heller to be part of the company's "Foot The Bill" initiative.

In June 2022, Ahmed and Wasim were in a video that was part of a MoMA research salon called "The Store and the Street" about how shops interact with people on the street.

In February 2024, Casa Magazines collaborated with Madewell for New York Fashion Week. The shop offered denim jackets embroidered with its logo and filled its windows with a special Madewell denim zine.

Later in 2024, Ahmed sold Casa Magazines to Hemal Sheth, who owns a small chain of magazine shops in Lower Manhattan called Iconic Magazines. At 73, Ahmed plans to retire but Wasim will continue to run the shop day to day.

== In media ==
- The New Yorker — "A Light House for Magazines".
- Office Magazine — "Long Live Casa Magazines".
- The New York Times' insider report — "Casa Magazines Is New York City's Best Kept Secret. The Secret Is Out".
- BBC News's special coverage — "Surviving Covid: How this New York newsstand kept going".
- New York Post — "This humble West Village newsstand has become a fashion world darling".

== Gallery ==
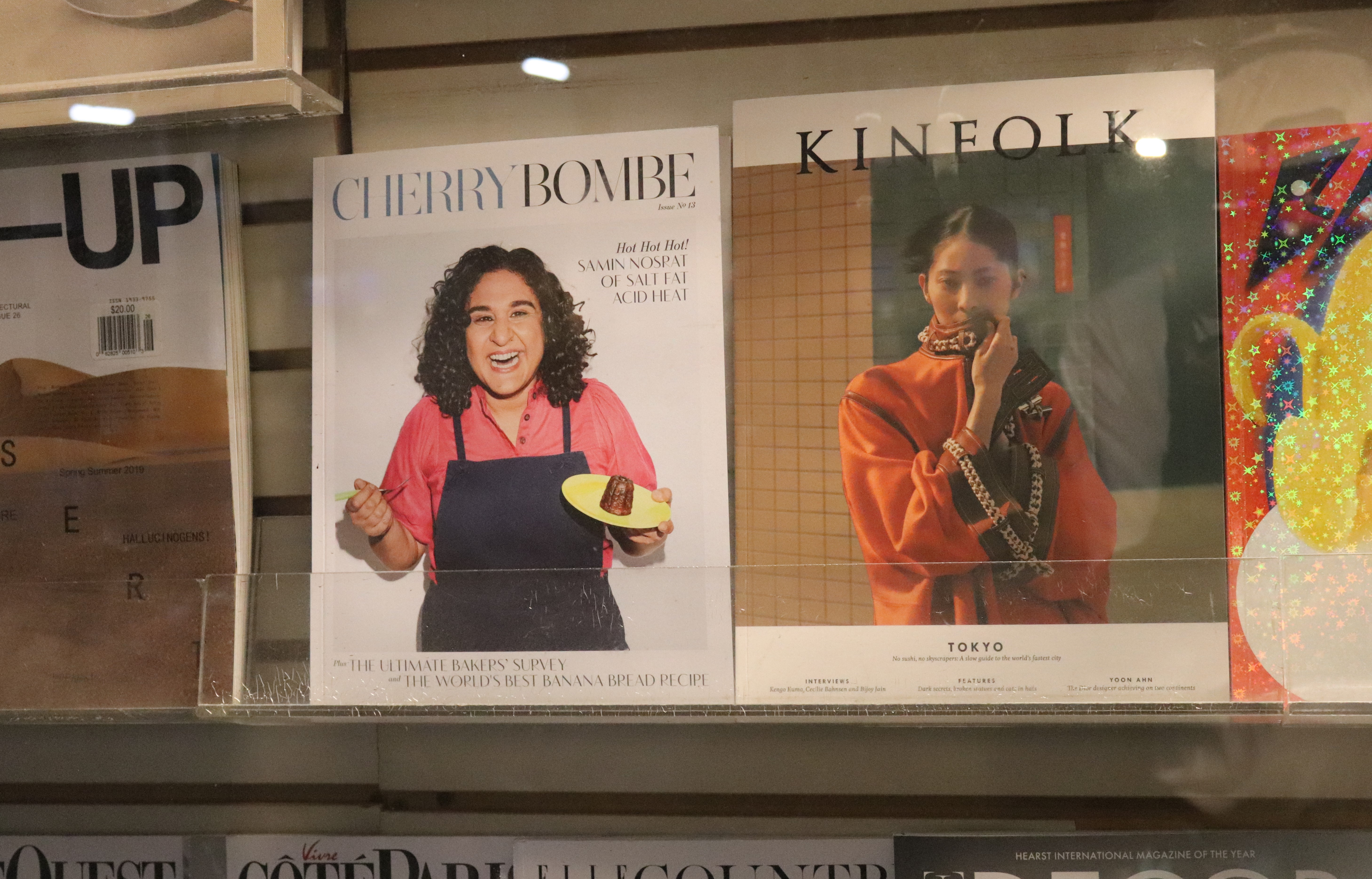
Print magazines on the shelf at Casa Magazines (June 2019)

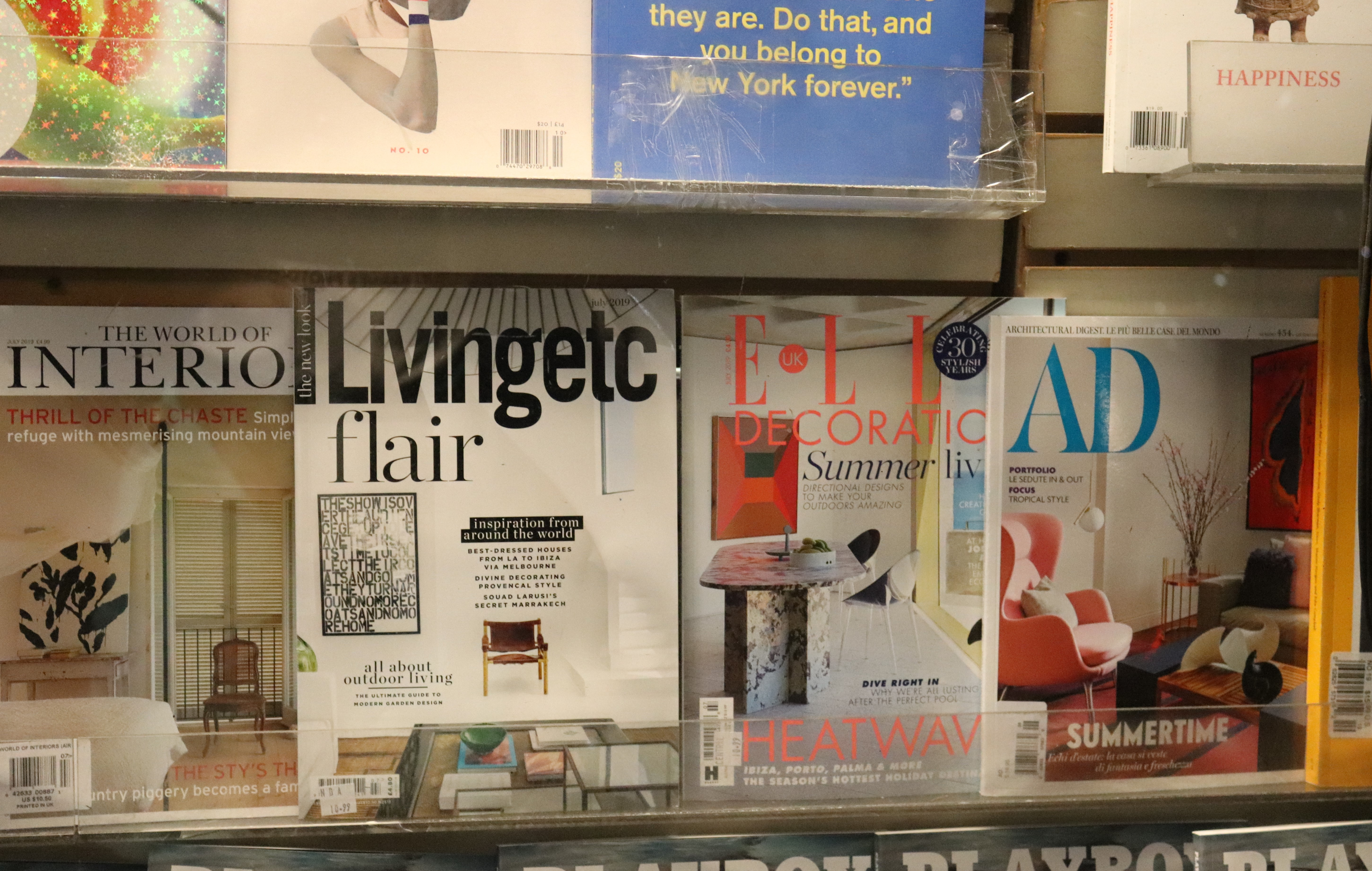
Print magazines on the shelf at Casa Magazines (June 2019)

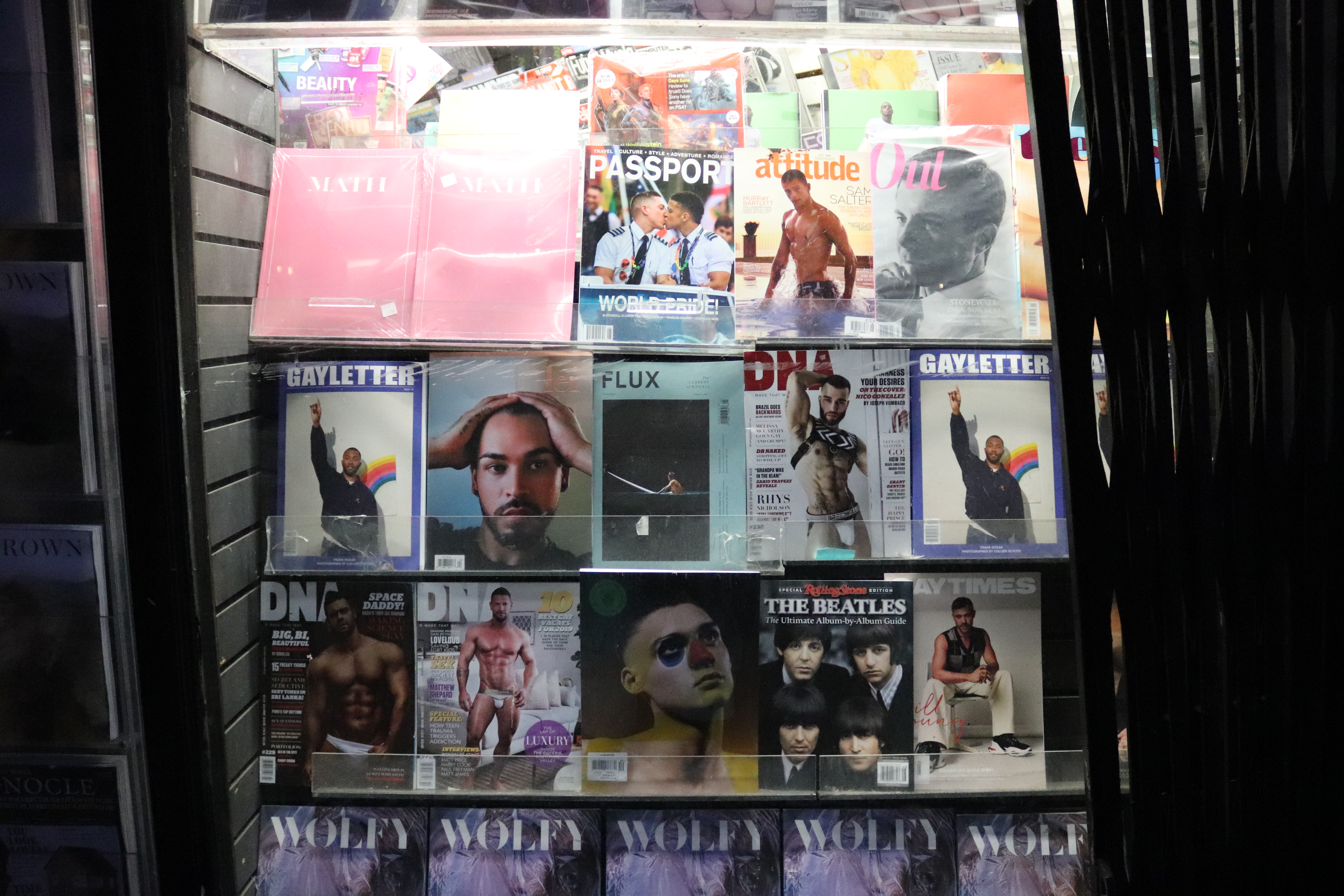
Print magazines on the shelf at Casa Magazines (June 2019)

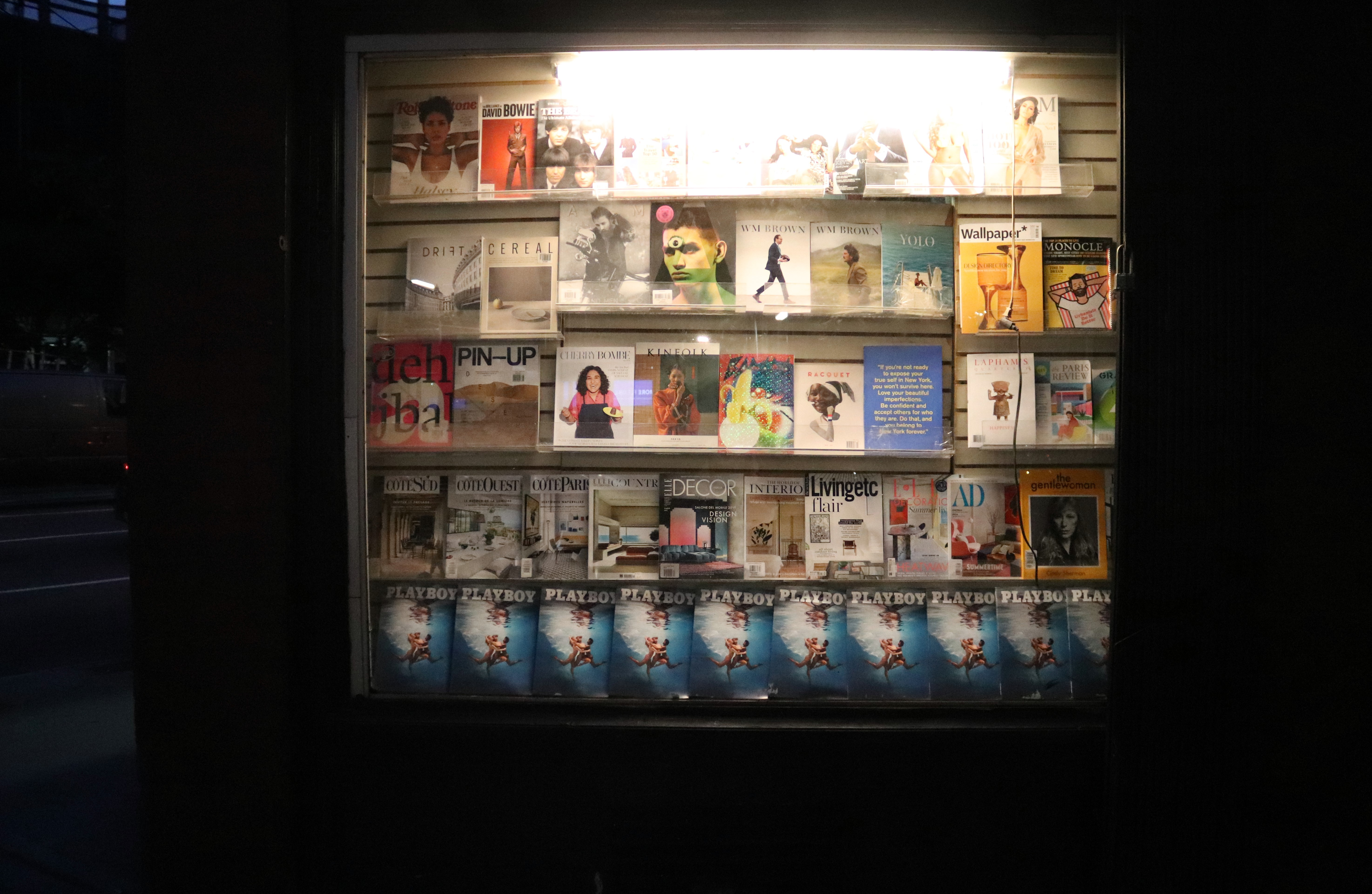
Print magazines on the shelf at Casa Magazines (June 2019)

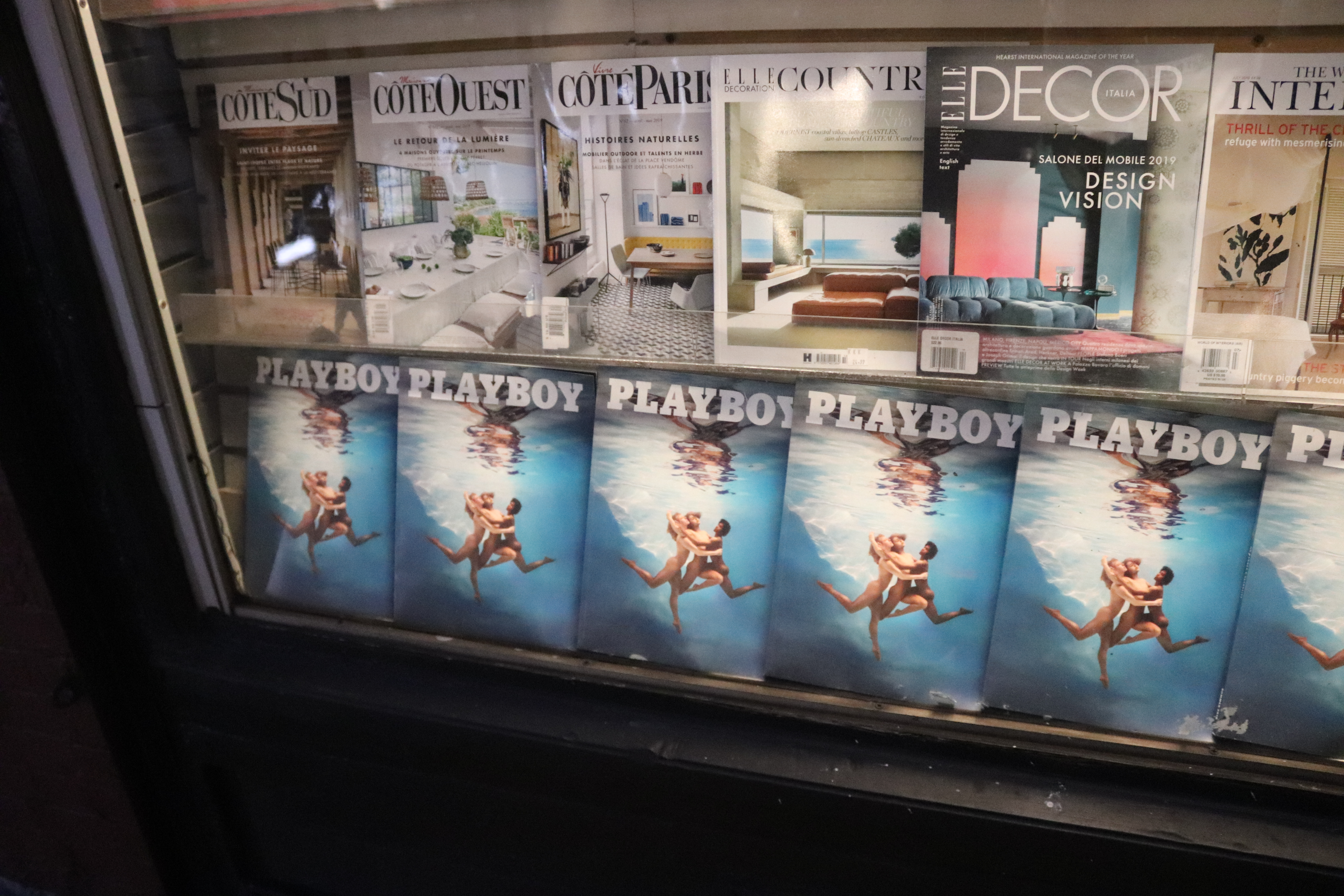
Copies of Côté Paris and ELLE Decor in mid-shelf and Playboy on the bottom shelf (June 2019)
