= 173 and 176 Perry Street =

Residential buildings in Manhattan, New York

Coordinates: 40.7346°N 74.0097°W

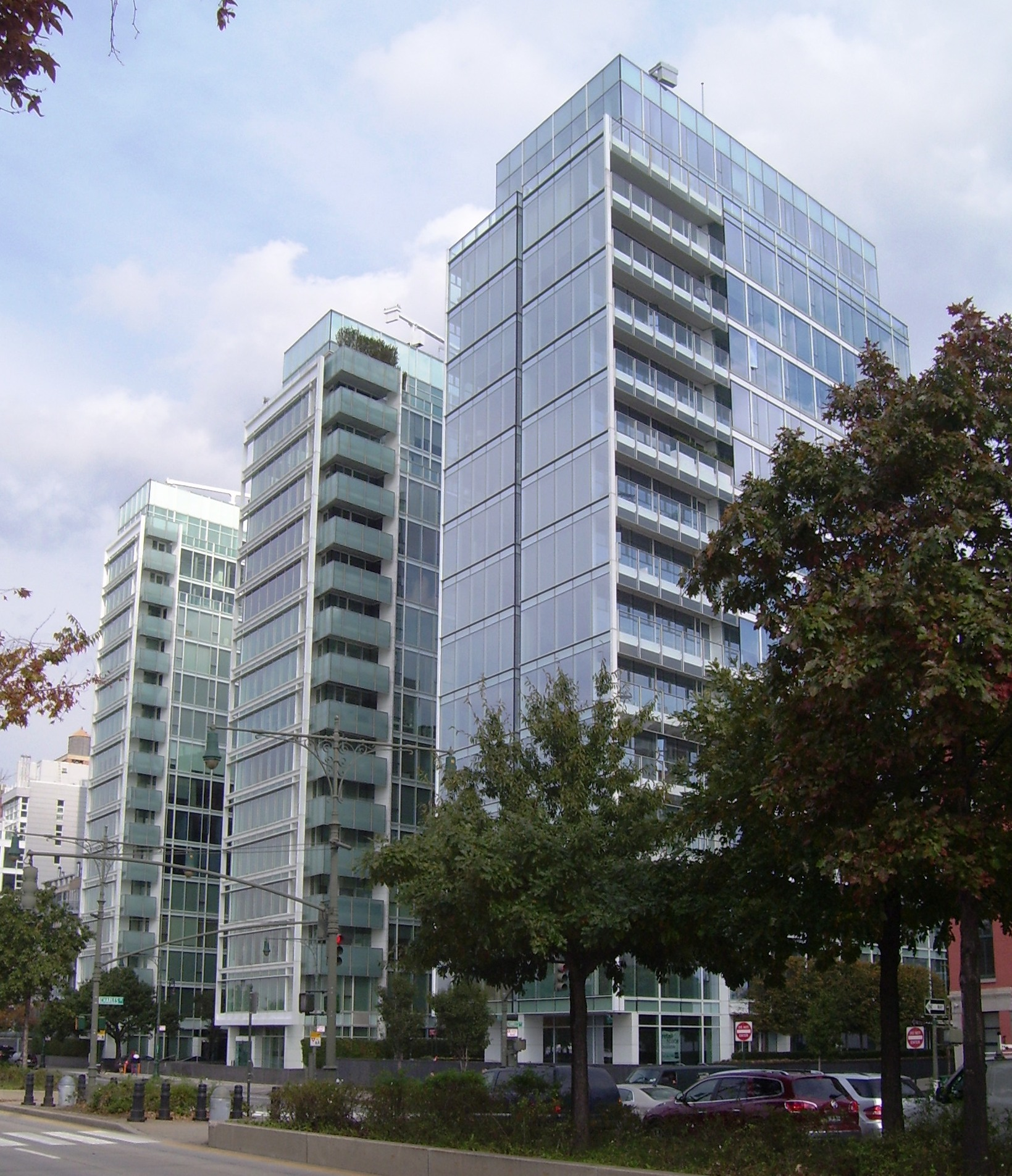
173 and 176 Perry Street are the two towers on the left, with Meier's 165 Charles Street on the right

173 and 176 Perry Street are a pair of high-rise residential buildings facing West Street in West Village, Manhattan, New York City. It was designed by Richard Meier & Partners, and are the first project undertaken by Meier in Manhattan, although they stand a short walk away from his 1970 renovation of the Westbeth Artists Community. Construction of the buildings began in 1997 and was completed in 2002.

Reporter Penelope Green of The New York Times referred to Meier's paired towers as "beauty queens". The third building in the assemblage, 165 Charles Street, to the south of the original two, was completed in 2004 and was also designed by Meier.
