= Thompson Creek (Santa Clara County, California) =

Stream in America

Thompson Creek Dry Creek
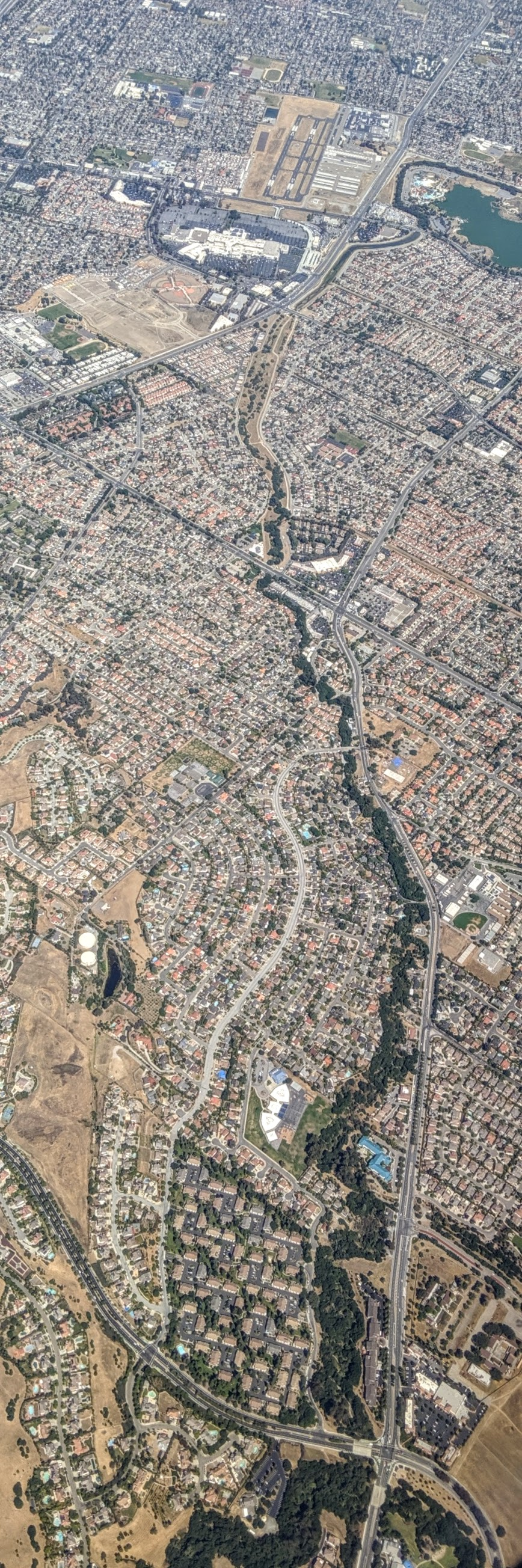
- Paralleling Coyote Creek to the east is its tributary (via Lower Silver Creek) Thompson Creek, along San Felipe Road with Reid–Hillview Airport, Eastridge Mall, and Lake Cunningham at top, Yerba Buena Road at bottom.

- Location of mouth

Location
- Country: United States
- State: California
- Region: Santa Cruz Counties

Physical characteristics
- Source: Edenvale Hills of
  - location: Evergreen Valley in southeast San Jose, California
  - coordinates: 37°15′29″N 121°42′18″W
  - elevation: 1,200 ft (370 m)
- Mouth: Lower Silver Creek
  - location: Just north of Lake Cunningham in southeast San Jose, California
  - coordinates: 37°20′24″N 121°48′35″W
  - elevation: 123 ft (37 m)
- Length: 10.8 mi (17.4 km)

Basin features
- Tributaries
  - left: Remnant of Upper Silver Creek
  - right: Yerba Buena Creek, Evergreen Creek, Fowler Creek, Quimby Creek, Norwood Creek

Thompson Creek is a 10.8-mile-long (17.4 km) northwestward-flowing stream currently originating on the southern slopes of Mount Misery in the western foothills of the Diablo Range. It flows along San Felipe Road then through Evergreen Valley in San Jose, Santa Clara County, California where it was extended in 1970 to Lower Silver Creek. The creek was one of several that fed into the marshy area known as Laguna Socayre, where the Lake Cunningham flood retention basin is now.

== History ==
Historically, Thompson Creek was known as Dry Creek and ran through the Rancho Socayre. The etymology of the name Thompson is unclear.

== Watershed and course ==
The Thompson Creek watershed currently drains an area of approximately 18 square miles (47 km^{2}) with its source on the southern flank of Mount Misery in the western foothills of the Diablo Range southeast of San Jose, California. Upper Silver Creek and Thompson Creek both historically sank into the alluvial basin of Evergreen Valley in southeast San Jose. Then they resurfaced and flowed into a large freshwater marsh known historically as Laguna Socayre, and referred to more recently as Silver Creek Marsh. In the 1970s, Upper Silver Creek flows were shunted due west into a flood control channel discharging directly to Coyote Creek south of Singleton Road, although a remnant of Silver Creek flows into Thompson Creek (after the latter was extended to Silver Creek Marsh in 1970). In 1978, Silver Creek Marsh was excavated into a flood water detention pond or reservoir, now known as Lake Cunningham. Thompson Creek joins Norwood Creek to form the source of today's Lower Silver Creek, as indicated by the Santa Clara Valley Water District (now Valley Water) map.

In addition to the remnant of Upper Silver Creek being tributary to Thompson Creek, it also receives numerous tributaries which drain the east San Jose foothills of the Diablo Range. These are, heading downstream: Yerba Buena Creek, Evergreen Creek, Fowler Creek, Quimby Creek, and Norwood Creek. Historically these were not connected to Thompson Creek, and sank into the alluvial plain of east Evergreen Valley, but in the 1970s were connected to Thompson Creek as part of the East Zone Flood Project in order to provide storm drainage for urban development.

== Ecology and conservation ==
Historically Thompson Creek did not reach today's Lake Cunningham and was not regarded as a steelhead trout (Oncorhynchus mykiss) spawning stream.

== See also ==
- Coyote Creek
- Lake Cunningham
- Lower Silver Creek
- Upper Silver Creek
