= Lower Silver Creek (Coyote Creek tributary) =

Stream in California, US

Lower Silver Creek Arroyo de Socayre
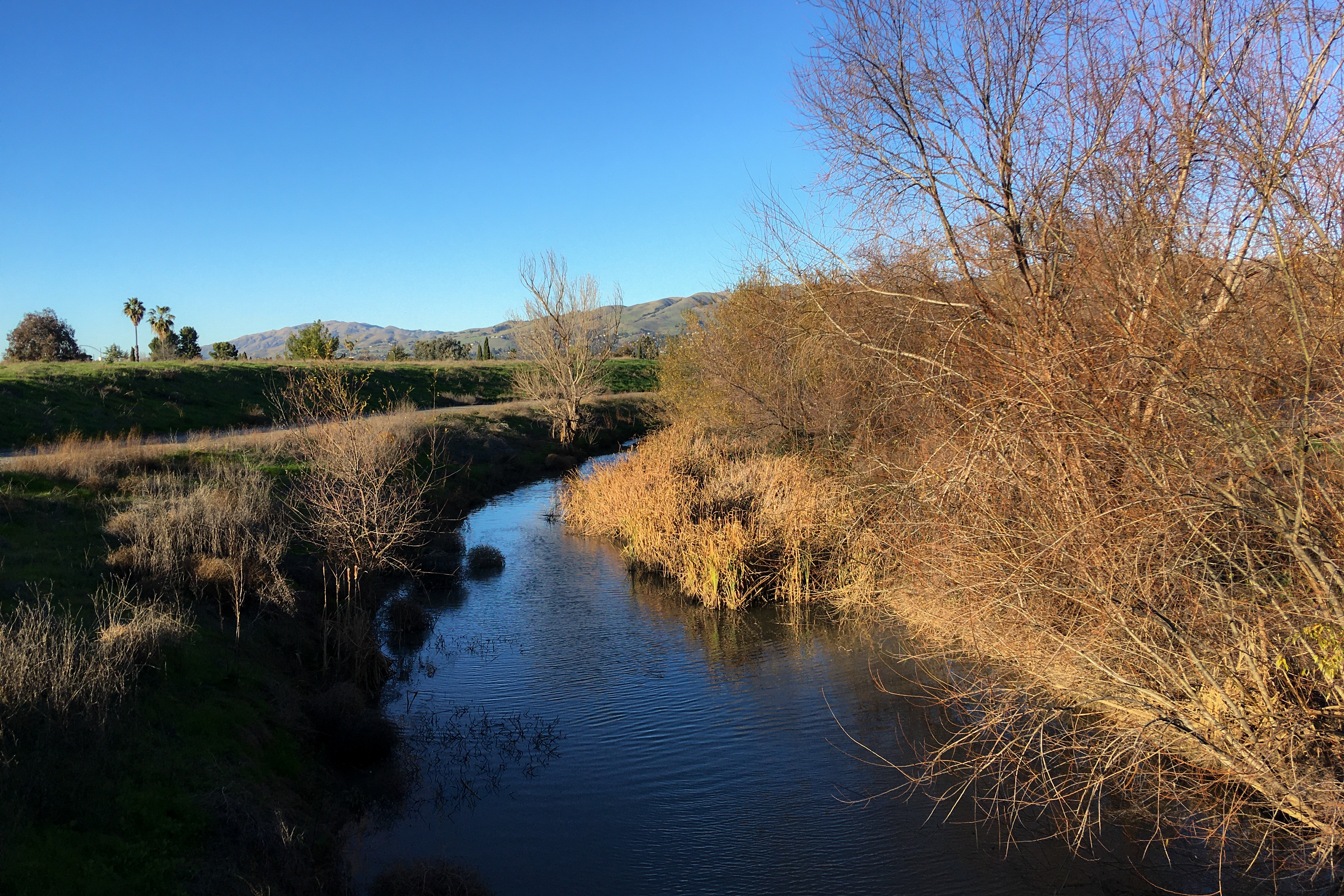

- Location of mouth

Location
- Country: United States
- State: California
- Region: Santa Cruz Counties

Physical characteristics
- Source: Confluence of Flint Creek and Thompson Creek at Lake Cunningham
  - location: Evergreen Valley in southeast San Jose, California
  - coordinates: 37°20′24″N 121°48′35″W
  - elevation: 123 ft (37 m)
- Mouth: Coyote Creek
  - location: Watson Park in southeast San Jose, California
  - coordinates: 37°21′23″N 121°52′26″W
  - elevation: 64 ft (20 m)
- Length: 4.7 mi (7.6 km)

Basin features
- Tributaries
  - left: Thompson Creek
  - right: Norwood Creek, Flint Creek, South Babb Creek, North Babb Creek, Miguelita Creek

Lower Silver Creek is a 4.7-mile-long (7.6 km) northwest and westward-flowing stream currently originating just north of Lake Cunningham in Evergreen Valley in southeast San Jose, Santa Clara County, California. It is tributary to Coyote Creek, whose waters flow to south San Francisco Bay and the Pacific Ocean.

== History ==
Historically, Silver Creek was known as Arroyo de Socayre and ran through the Rancho Socayre. Silver Creek was probably named for its silvery appearance, although the word "silver" may have been used to indicate nearby quicksilver (mercury ore) deposits.

== Watershed and course ==
The creek currently drains an area of over 43 square miles (110 km^{2}) with its source in the Edenvalle Hills of southeast San Jose, California. Upper Silver Creek and Thompson Creek both begin in the Edenvale Hills, and historically sank into the alluvial basin of Evergreen Valley in southeast San Jose. Then they resurfaced and flowed into a large freshwater marsh known historically as Laguna Socayre, and referred to more recently as Silver Creek Marsh. In 1978, Silver Creek Marsh was excavated into a flood water detention pond or reservoir, now known as Lake Cunningham. Thus, Lower Silver Creek used to begin southwest of where Lake Cunningham is today, but now its source is regarded as just north of this artificial lake by the Santa Clara Valley Water District (now Valley Water) at the confluence of Thompson Creek and Norwood Creek. In the 1970s, Upper Silver Creek flows were shunted due west into a flood control channel discharging directly to Coyote Creek south of Singleton Road.

After its current source at (or slightly south of) the confluence of Norwood Creek and Thompson Creek, Lower Silver Creek tributaries include South Babb Creek, North Babb Creek, and Miguelita Creek. In the 1970s, the East Zone Flood Project connected many of these tributaries to Lower Silver Creek to provide storm drainage for urban development. Lower Silver Creek ends at its confluence with Coyote Creek at Watson Park, northwest of McKee Road.

== Ecology and conservation ==
In 1962 Lower Silver Creek was reported as an historical migration route and habitat for steelhead trout (Oncorhynchus mykiss).

Lower Silver Creek photo gallery:

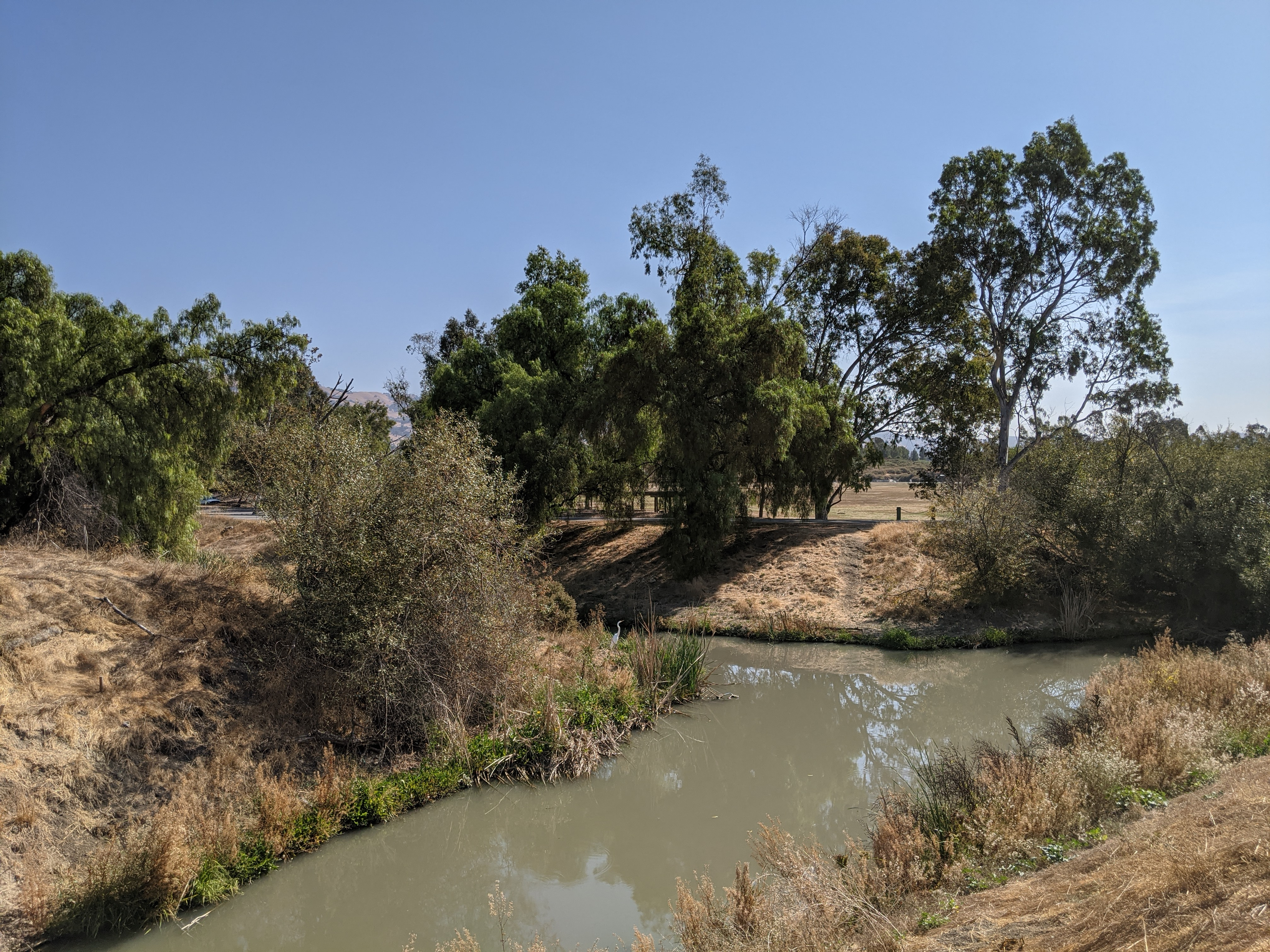
Draining Lake Cunningham Regional Park

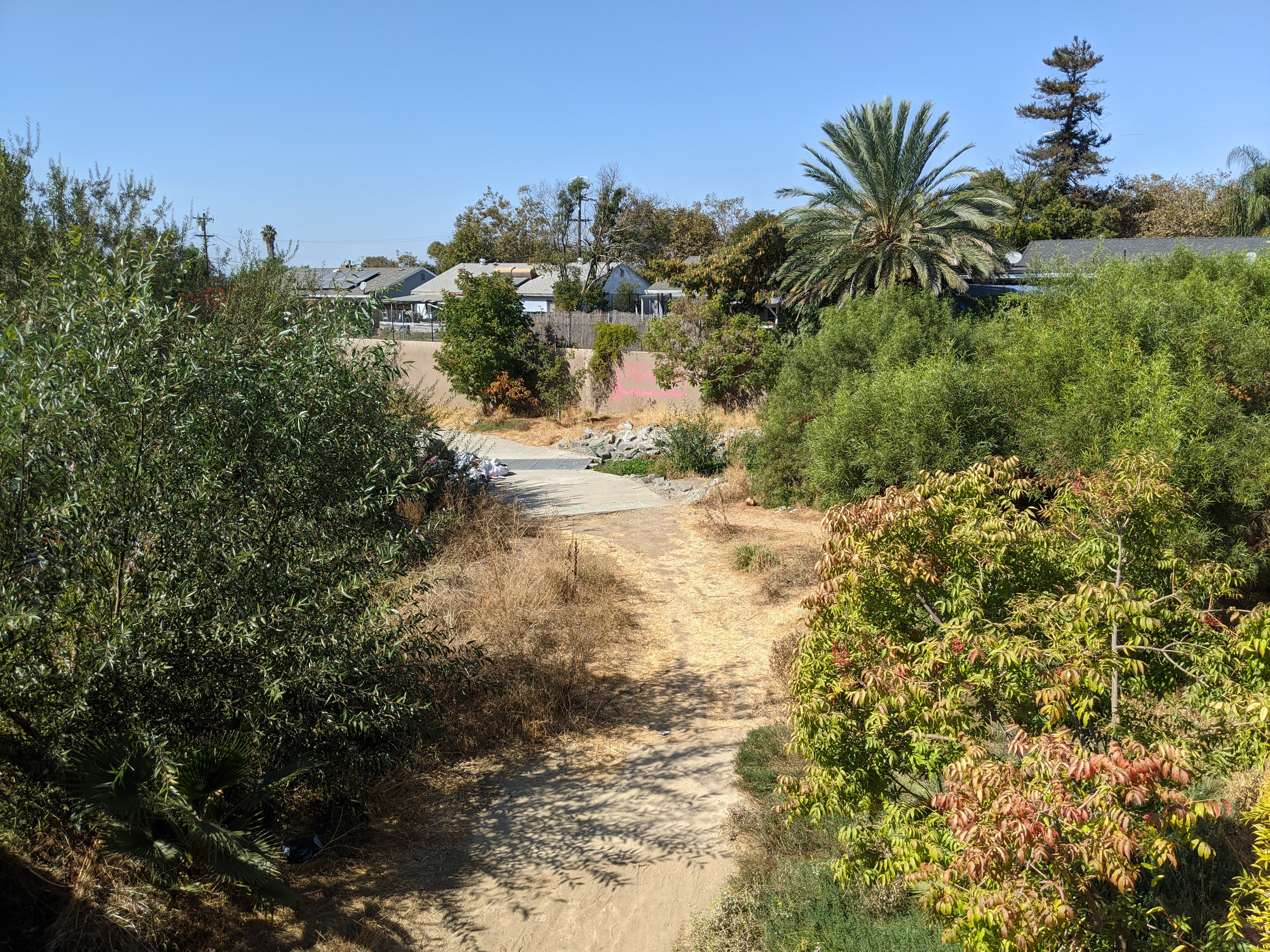
Babb Creek confluence at Silver Ave.

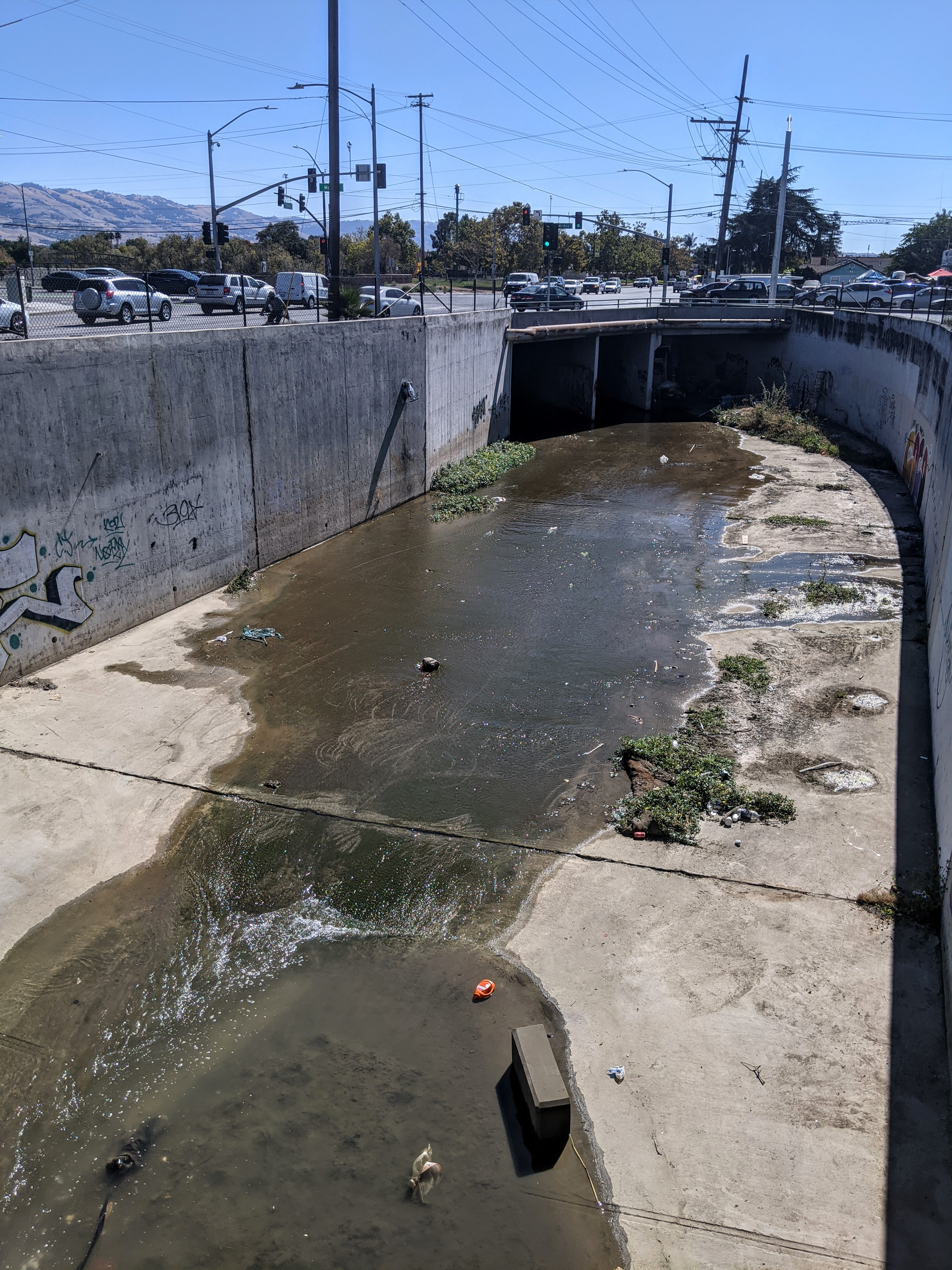
Coming from under McKee Road and King Road

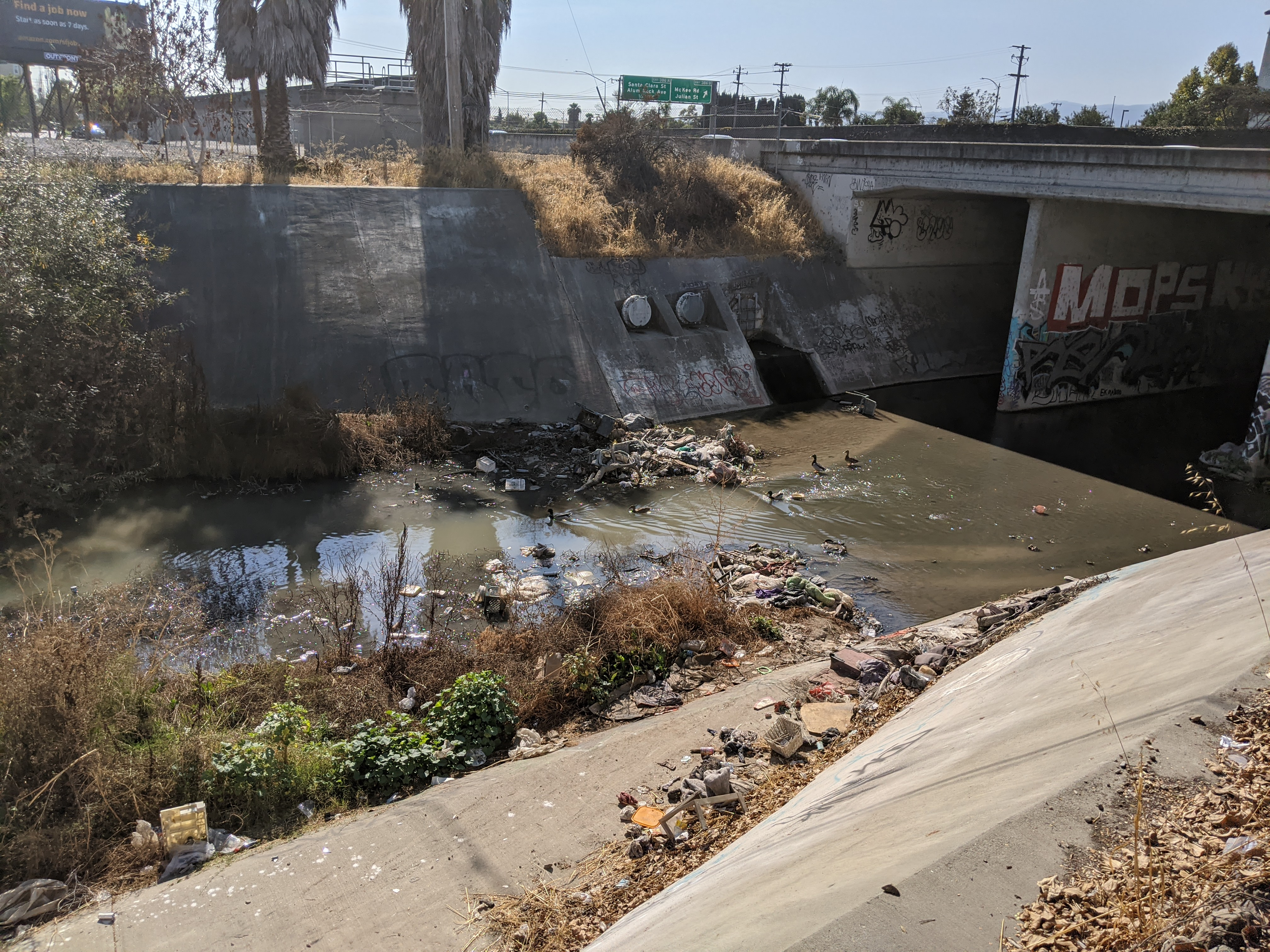
After merge with Miguelita Creek, into the culvert under US 101

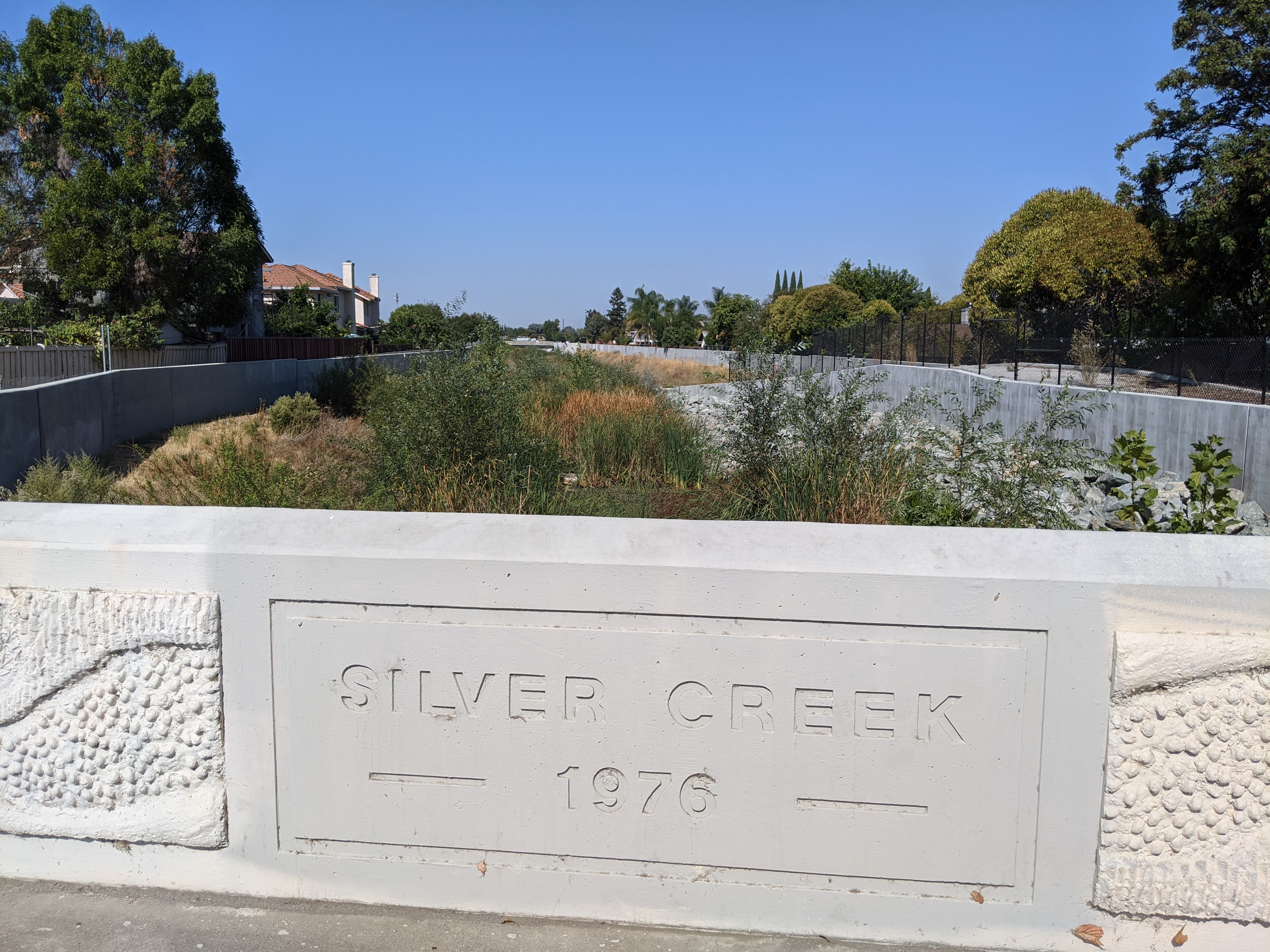
Lower Silver Creek concrete channel at Cunningham Avenue

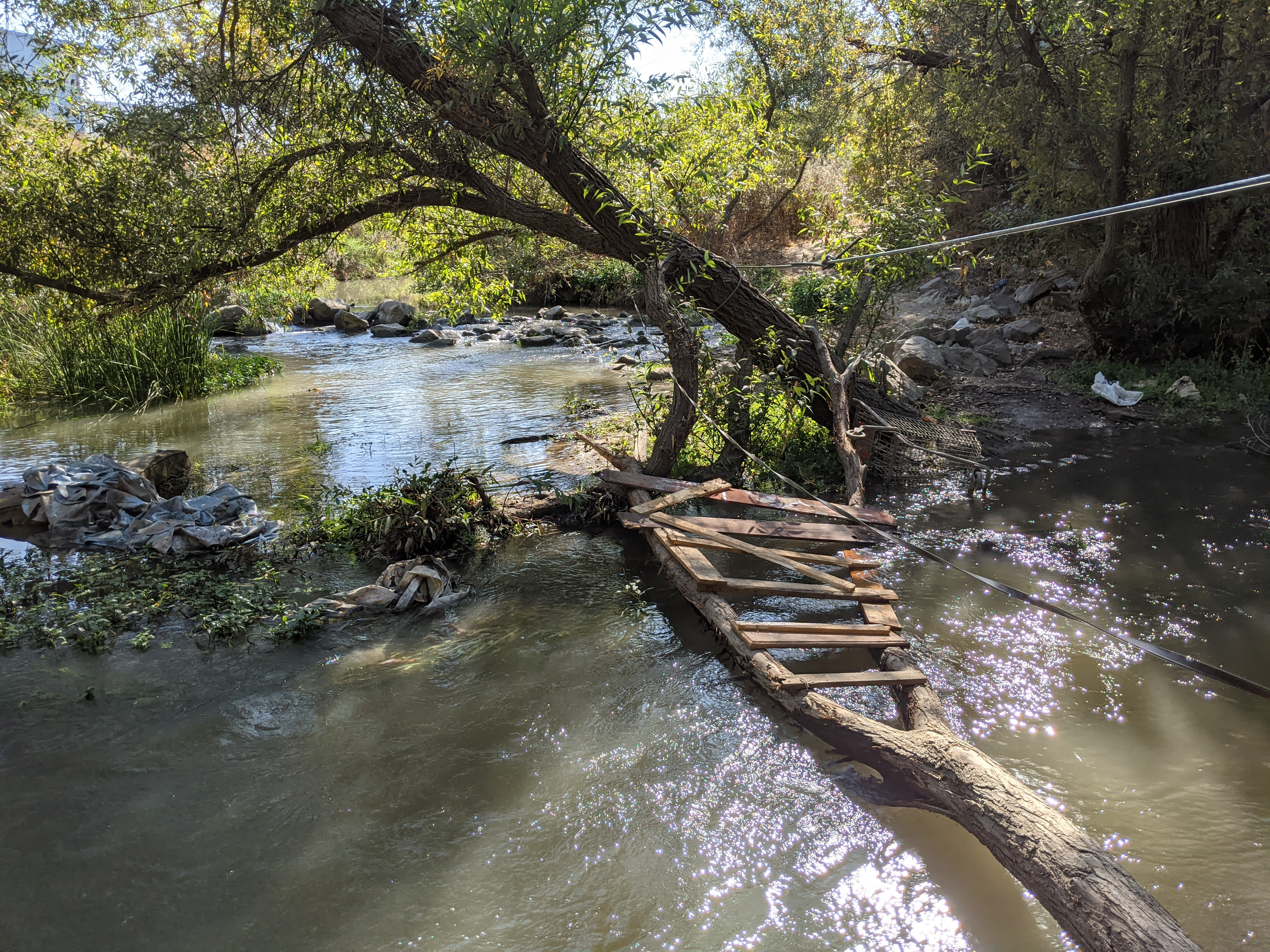
Confluence with Coyote Creek at Watson Park

== See also ==
- Coyote Creek
