= Upper Silver Creek (Coyote Creek tributary) =

Stream in California, US

Upper Silver Creek Arroyo de Socayre
- Location of mouth

Location
- Country: United States
- State: California
- Region: Santa Cruz Counties

Physical characteristics
- Source: Edenvale Hills in southeast San Jose, California
  - coordinates: 37°14′45″N 121°43′27″W
  - elevation: 1,053 ft (321 m)
- Mouth: Coyote Creek
  - location: San Jose, California
  - coordinates: 37°17′32″N 121°49′10″W
  - elevation: 133 ft (41 m)
- Length: 8.3 mi (13.4 km)

Upper Silver Creek is a 8.3-mile-long (13.4 km) northwestward-flowing stream originating in the Edenvale Hills in southeast San Jose, Santa Clara County, California. It was diverted for flood control due west where it is tributary to Coyote Creek, whose waters flow to south San Francisco Bay and the Pacific Ocean.

== History ==
Historically, Silver Creek was known as Arroyo de Socayre and ran through the Rancho Socayre. Silver Creek was probably named for its silvery appearance, although the word "silver" may have been used to indicate nearby quicksilver (mercury ore) deposits.

== Watershed and course ==
The creek currently drains an area of over 6 square miles (16 km^{2}) with its source in the Edenvalle Hills of southeast San Jose, California. Upper Silver Creek and Thompson Creek both begin in the Edenvale Hills, and historically sank into the alluvial basin of Evergreen Valley in southeast San Jose. Then they resurfaced and flowed into a large freshwater marsh known historically as Laguna Socayre, and referred to more recently as Silver Creek Marsh. In 1978, Silver Creek Marsh was excavated into a flood water detention pond or reservoir, now known as Lake Cunningham. Thus, Lower Silver Creek used to begin southwest of where Lake Cunningham is today, but now its source is regarded as just north of this artificial lake by the Santa Clara Valley Water District, now known as Valley Water. In the 1970s, Upper Silver Creek flows were shunted due west into a flood control channel discharging directly to Coyote Creek south of Singleton Road.

== Ecology and conservation ==
In 1962 Upper Silver Creek was reported as an historical migration route and habitat for steelhead trout (Oncorhynchus mykiss). However, in July 1975, California Department of Fish & Game visually surveyed Upper Silver Creek between the U.S. Highway 101 bridge and the headwaters. The survey reportnoted an impassable culvert in the lower reach that was suspected of precluding use by salmonids.

== See also ==
- Coyote Creek
