= Amelia Reid =

American pilot and mathematician (1924–2001)

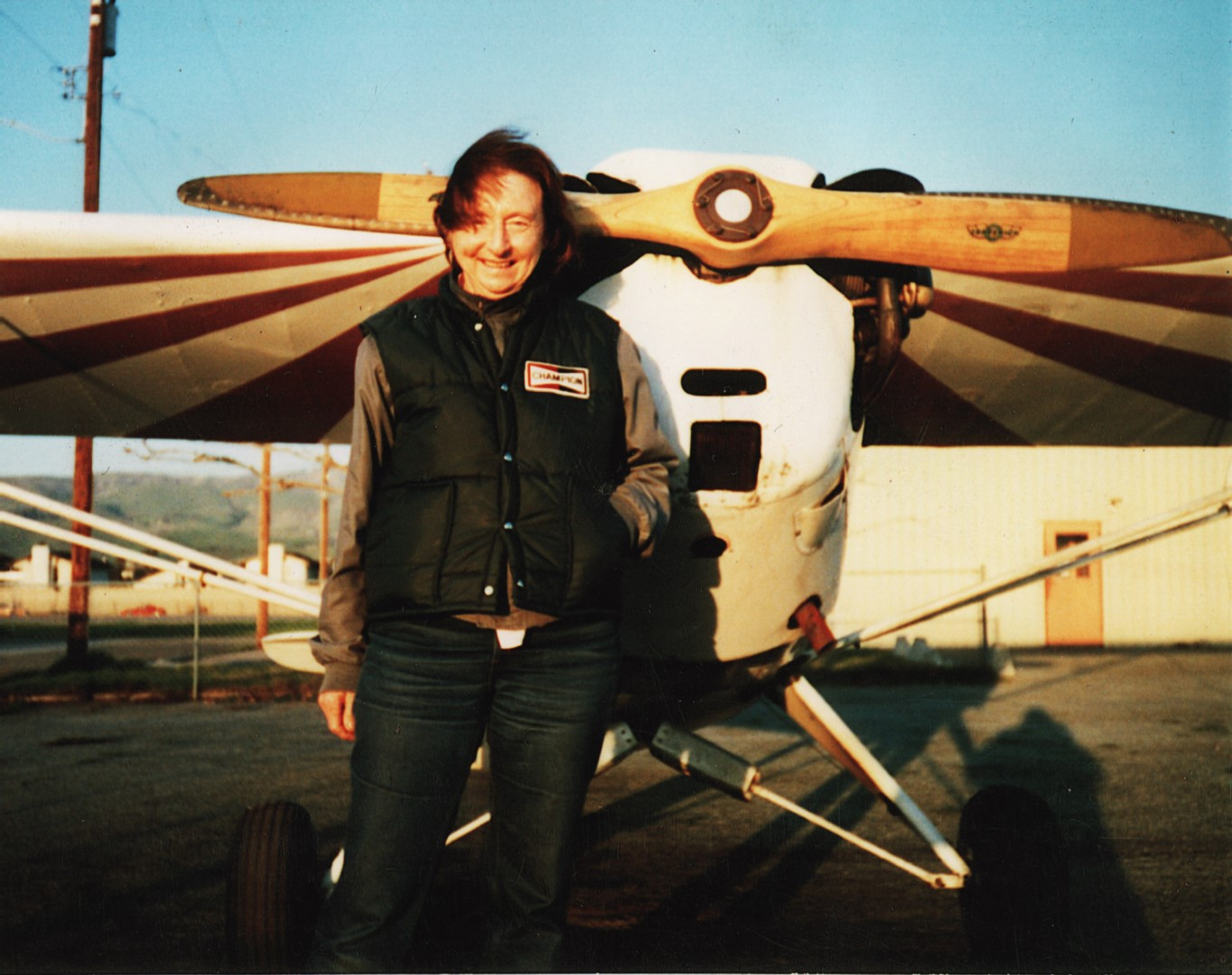
- Born: Amelia Lola; 13 November 1924; Ord, Nebraska, US
- Died: 3 March 2001 (aged 76)
- Education: Kearney State College; (now University of Nebraska at Kearney); San Jose State University
- Spouse: Robert Reid Jr. (divorced)
- Children: Robert "Robin" Reid III
- Awards: Aircraft Owners and Pilots Association Lawrence P. Sharples Award

Amelia Reid (November 13, 1924 – March 3, 2001) was a mathematician, pilot, flight instructor, businesswoman, airshow performer, and airport advocate. She was the founder of Amelia Reid Aviation (now AeroDynamic Aviation) and is known as California's First Lady of Aviation.

== Early life and education ==
Reid got her first taste of flying in 1940 when pilot Evelyn Sharp took her on a ride in a Piper Cub J-2. In 1941 Reid had her first flying lessons, and in May 1946 she earned her pilot's license.

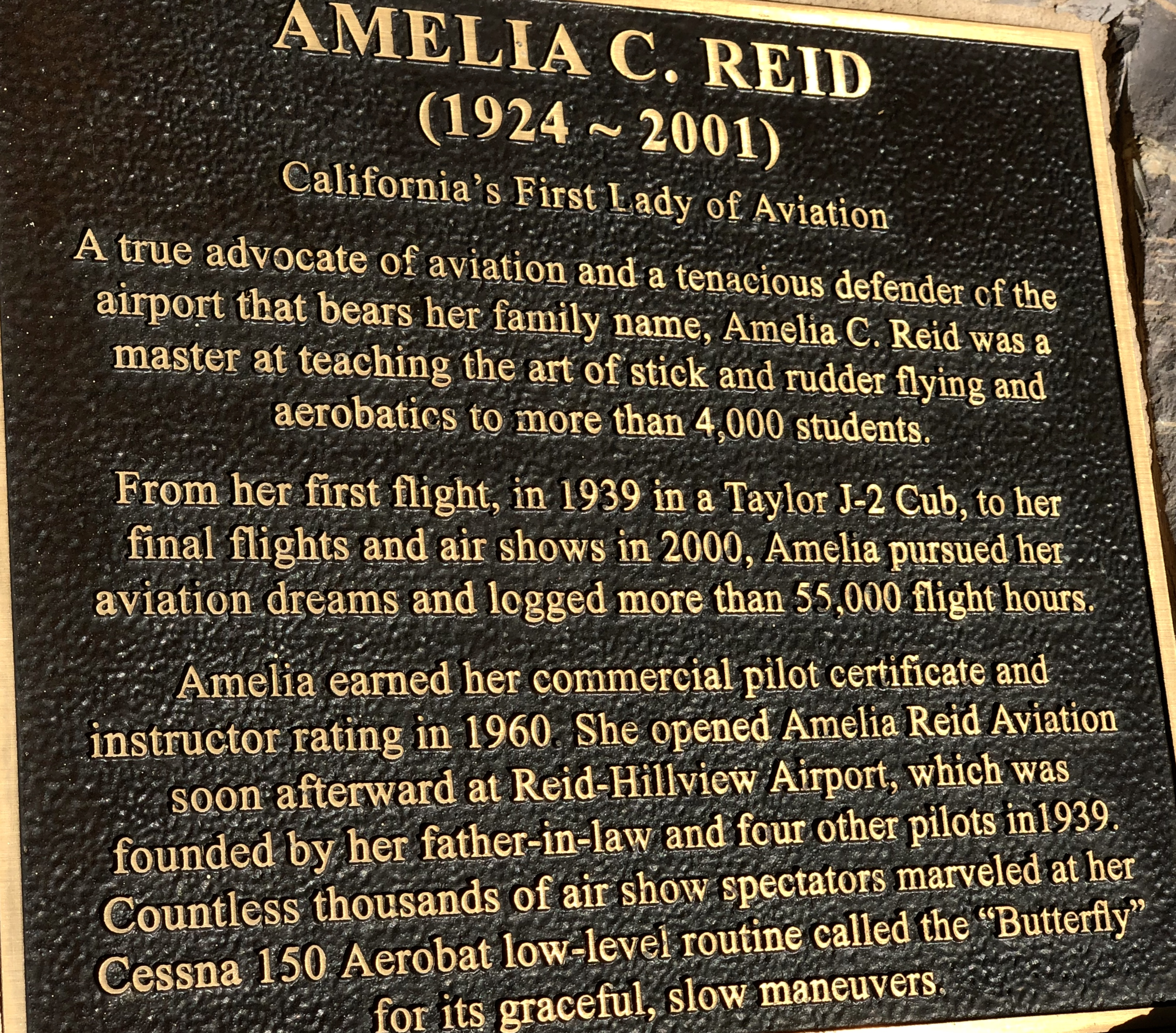
A plaque honoring Reid at Reid Hillview Airport in San Jose.

Reid studied mathematics at Kearney State College in Nebraska, earning her bachelor's degree in June 1945. Reid then attended San Jose State University where she earned her master's degree in mathematics. She worked at NACA (now known as NASA) as a human computer and programing mathematician from 1945 to 1958. Because the NACA Ames Research Center, where she worked, did not allow flexibility in her work schedule, she left after the birth of her son.

== Career ==
From there Reid returned to flying and became a certified commercial pilot with instructor ratings in 1960. That same year, Reid founded Amelia Reid Aviation, a flight school at Reid-Hillview Airport in San Jose, California. The company bought their first aircraft, a Taylorcraft L-2, for just $350. Reid initially ran the business out of her 1959 Ford and, later, out of two trailers. She mortgaged her home and constructed a permanent hangar and office building in 1967, from which she operated her flight school for the rest of her life.

Reid logged over 55,000 flight hours and trained more than 4,000 pilots. She flew in countless airshows, her last at age 75 in a Cessna Aerobat. She won the 1996 Aircraft Owners and Pilots Association Lawrence P. Sharples Award and was inducted into the National Association of Flight Instructors Hall of Fame.

Reid's students include noted airshow performer Sean D. Tucker, aviation author and speaker Rod Machado, aerospace engineer and author H. Paul Shuch (whose recurring fictional character Avalon Eden is based in part on Reid), and Jason Dahl, the captain on United flight 93 on September 11, 2001.

== Activism ==
In the 1960s, Reid-Hillview Airport, founded in 1939 by five local airmen including Reid's father-in-law, was sold to Santa Clara County. The growth of Silicon Valley in the San Jose area instigated campaigns to close the airport. Reid was a strong advocate of the preservation of the airport and a founder of the Reid-Hillview Airport Association.

== Later life ==
On January 16, 2001, Reid had a stroke, and she died on March 3, 2001, at age 76.
