= Raging Waters =

California water park chain

Coordinates: 34.0781°N 117.8110°W

Raging Waters Los Angeles
- Industry: Water park
- Founded: June 18, 1983; 43 years ago
- Area served: California, United States
- Owner: Lucky Strike Entertainment
- Website: www.ragingwaters.com

Raging Waters Los Angeles is a water theme park in San Dimas, California owned and operated by Lucky Strike Entertainment. It is the largest water park in California.

== Raging Waters Los Angeles ==
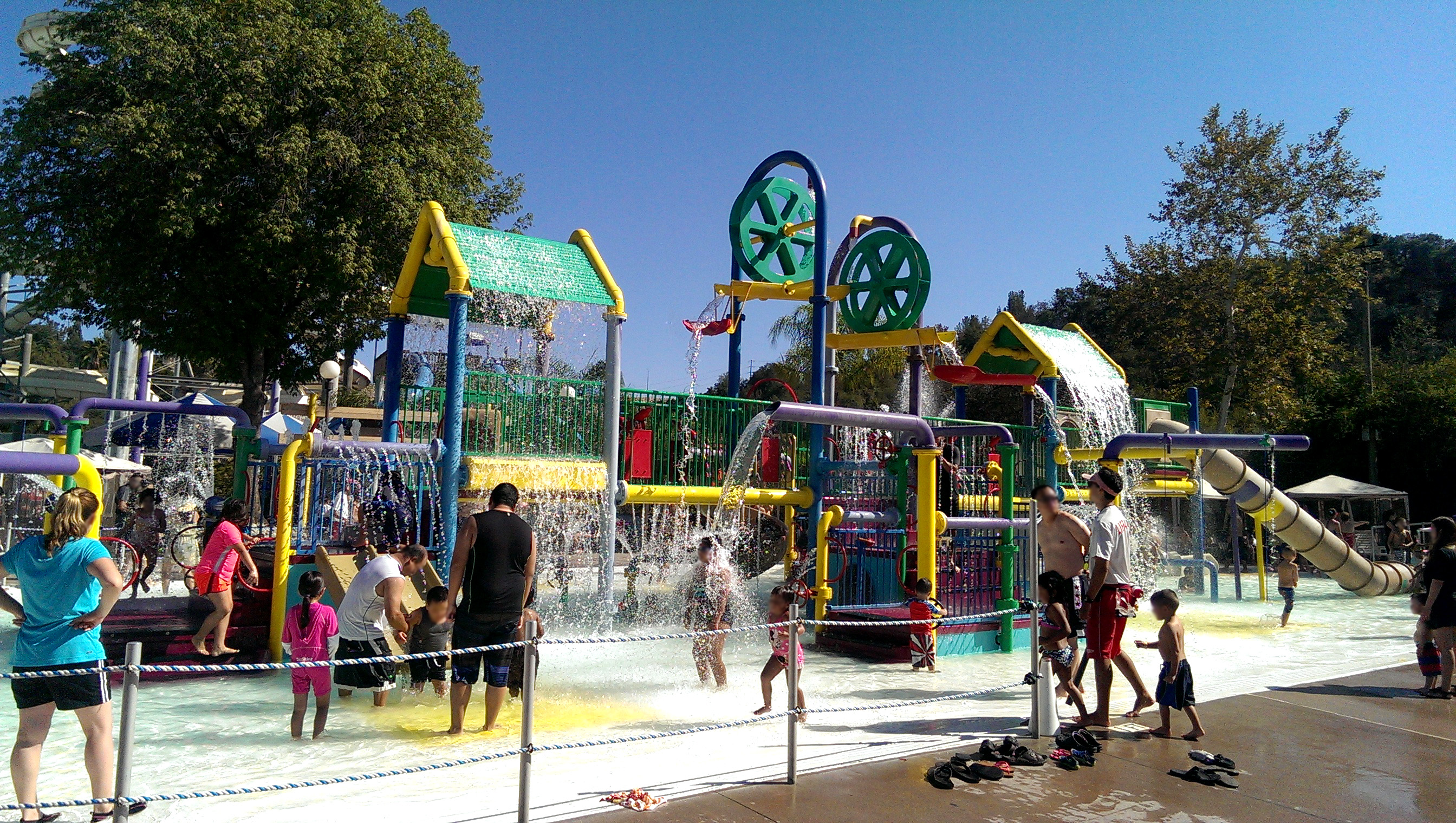
Kid's Kingdom, a play area for young children at Raging Waters Los Angeles

Raging Waters Los Angeles opened June 18, 1983, located in Los Angeles County in the city of San Dimas, near SR 57 between Interstate 10 and Interstate 210. At 60 acres, park management described it as California's largest waterpark (2011).

The park was formerly known as "Raging Waters San Dimas" but, as of 2016, official media was using the name "Raging Waters Los Angeles" for this location. The park inspired the waterpark scenes in the 1989 movie Bill & Ted's Excellent Adventure.

In early 2025, it was sold to Herschend Family Entertainment briefly before being sold to Lucky Strike Entertainment.

=== Attractions ===
Aqua Rocket is a ProSlide Hydro Magnetic slide that uses magnetic propulsion to propel a raft up hills.

Amazon Adventure is a quarter-mile-long, 3-foot-deep (0.9 m), tropical river that runs through a section of the park. Riders sit in rafts as the current pulls them around the river route.

Bermuda Triangle consists of three twisting, turning tunnels that recycle more than 2,500 gallons of water per minute, and make riders feel like they have ‘entered’ the Bermuda Triangle.

Bombs Away are two WhiteWater trapdoor slides, one with an open free-fall drop, and the other with an enclosed loop; opened in 2023. Replaced Dropout slides.

Dark Hole is a system of two tunnel water slides with a drop of 52 feet. Riders sit in a two-person raft, speeding through total darkness. This attraction was the first of its kind in the country. Riders travel at a speed of 26 miles per hour.

Dr. Von Dark's Tunnel of Terror is a ProSlide Trantrum slide in which riders experience a 40-foot drop into a dark tunnel. Riders will then drop into a small mini-funnel.

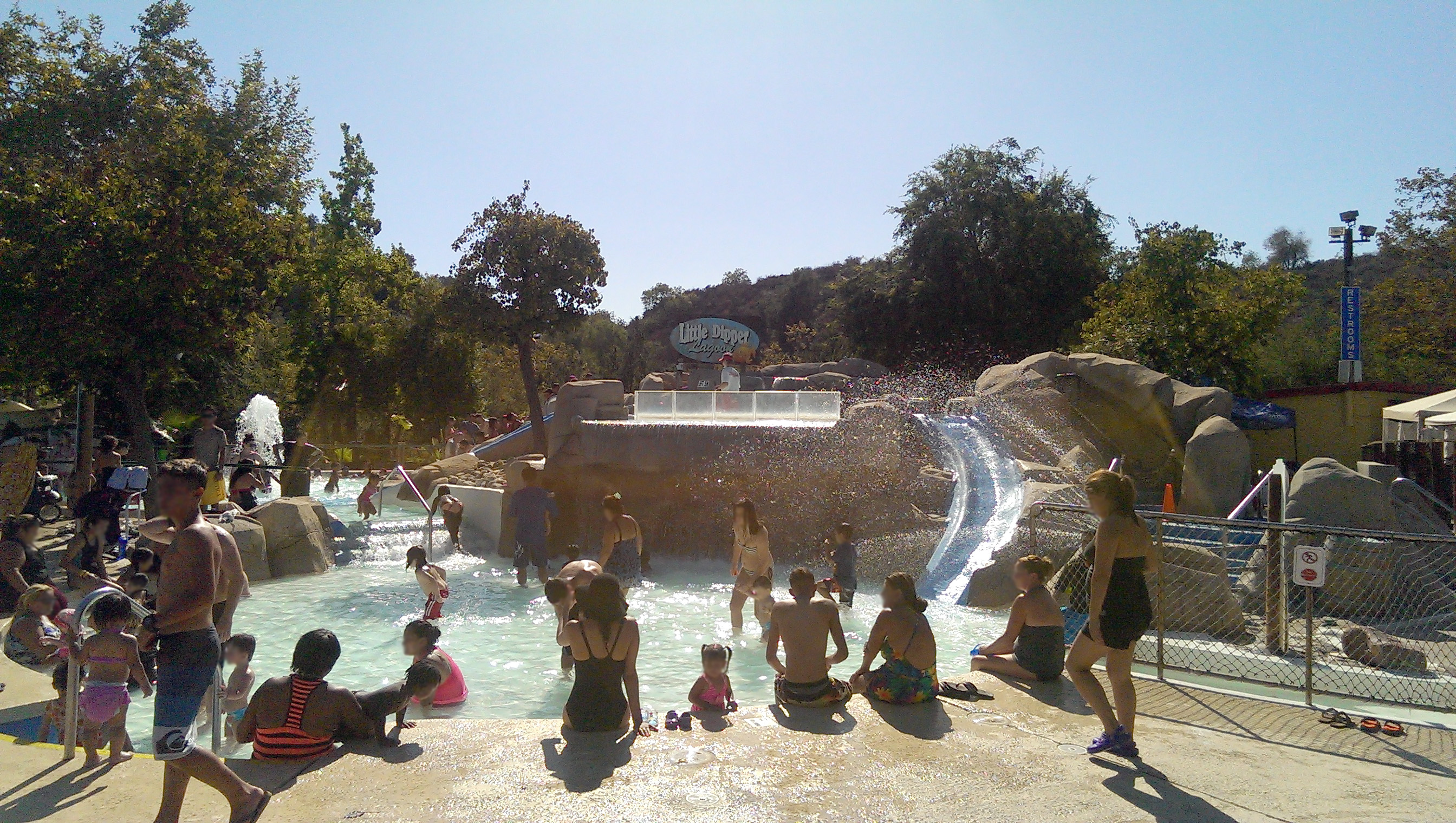
"Little Dipper Lagoon", another play area for children, at Raging Waters Los Angeles

Dragon's Den is a slide which debuted in 2004, and is a two-person tube-ride that sends guests plummeting down a steep 45-foot (14 m) tunnel, circling around a 35-foot (11 m) bowl 9-foot (2.7 m) until they fall through a secret tunnel at the bottom. As of 2016, Dragon's Den is also ridden as a single-rider attraction, with tubes identical to the ones used in Amazon River.

High Extreme is the name of two 600-foot-long (180 m) mat slides that reach speeds of up to 35 miles an hour (56 km/h).

Kid's Kingdom is a small kids’ water playground with 4 small water slides.

Little Dipper Lagoon is a kids’ splash area with a few small water slides for toddlers and very young kids.

Neptune’s Fury is a 600-foot (180 m) long, pitch-black raft slide which can hold up to 4 people.

Ragin’ Racer is a ProSlide 8-lane mat racer slide where riders experience multiple drops before a splash-down.

Speed Slides are high speed body slides called Raging Rocket and Screamer.

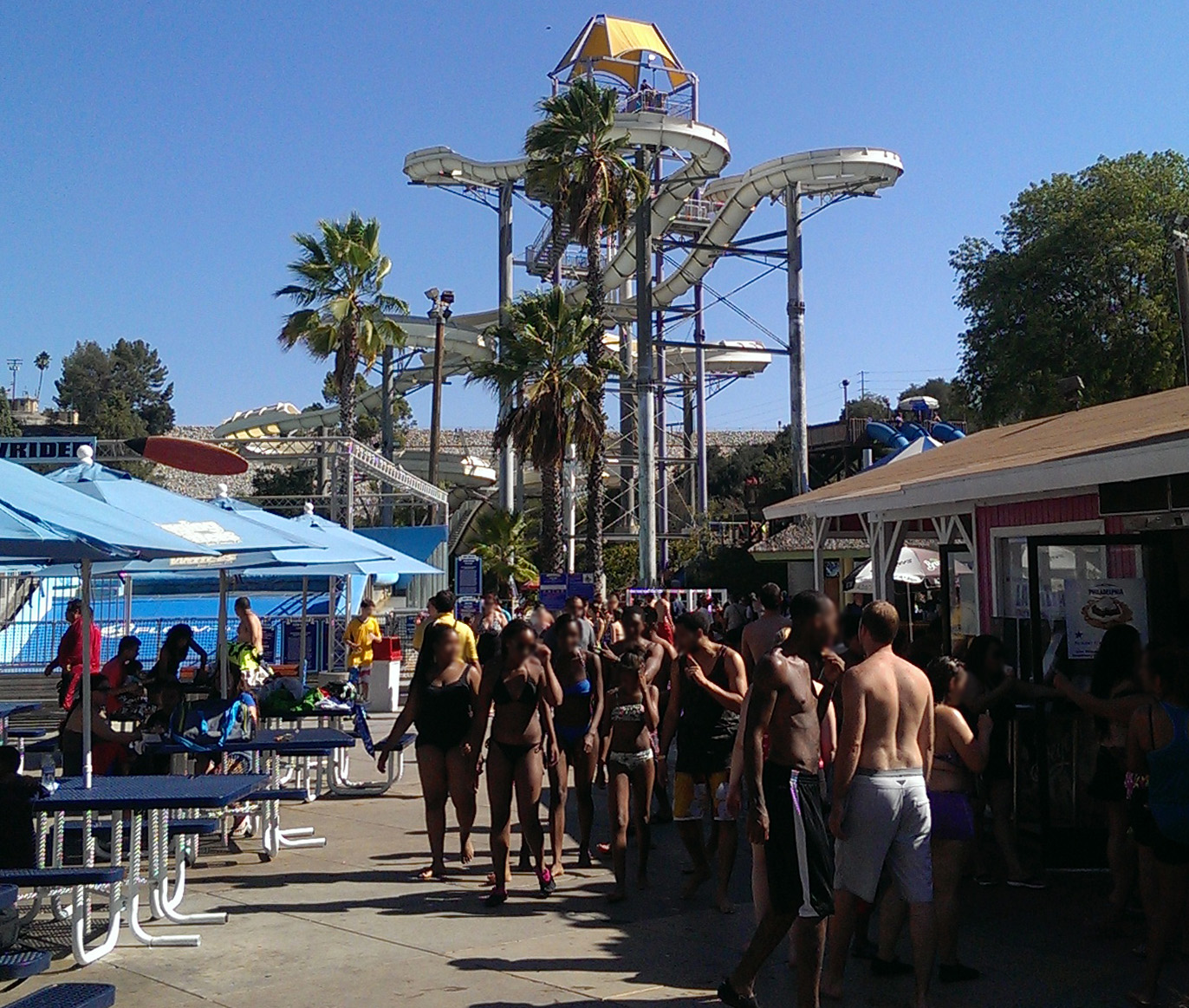
High Extreme at Raging Waters Los Angeles, with dining area visible in foreground

Splash Island Adventure is an SCS Interactive water playground with 4 water slides, a 1,000-gallon tipping bucket, and more than 75 interactive water features.

Thunder Rapids is a five-person family raft slide that is open-air.

Volcano Fantasea is a small volcano themed kids area.

Wave Cove is a wave pool that produces 3-foot-tall waves every 12 minutes.

== Other parks ==
=== Raging Waters Sydney ===
Raging Waters Sydney is located in Greater Western Sydney, and was formerly known as Wet'n'Wild until being acquired in 2018 by Parques Reunidos.

=== Raging Waters Sacramento ===
Raging Waters Sacramento was located at Cal Expo and was formerly known as Six Flags Waterworld. Palace Entertainment would terminate their lease on November 8, 2022 "after a careful review of company priorities". In 2023, Silverwood Entertainment took over the park and announced a 3-year plan to completely refurbish the park. The park is planned to reopen under the name "Calibunga" and will include a year-round restaurant named "Cal Soleil", as well as a Chuck E. Cheese themed area. In February 2026 the plans were put into question because the developer missed lease payments.

=== Raging Waters San Jose ===
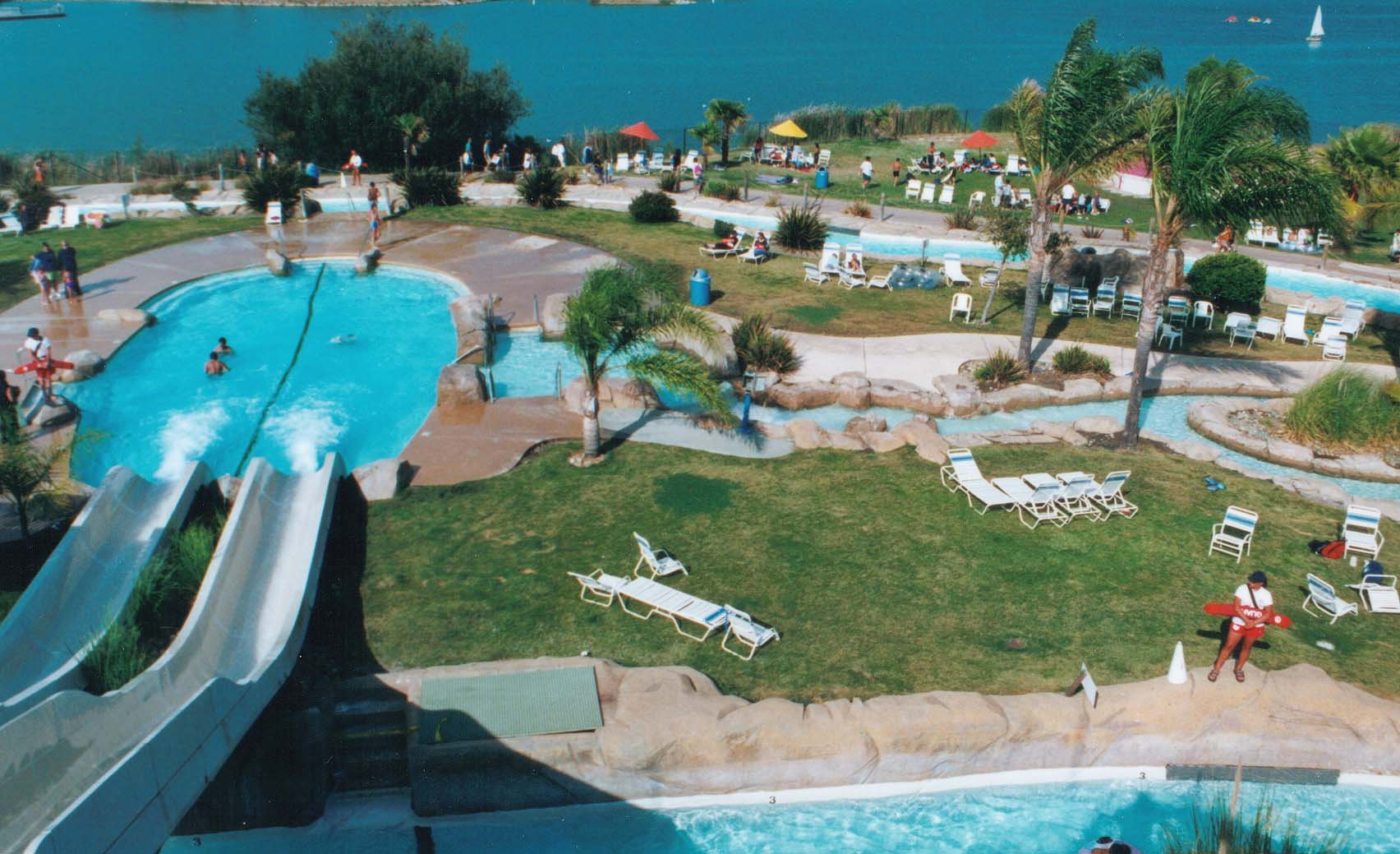
View of Raging Waters San Jose in 2000

Raging Waters San Jose was located in Lake Cunningham Park in East San Jose, adjacent to Capitol Expressway, Eastridge Mall, Eastridge Transit Center and Reid-Hillview Airport. The park opened to the public in 1985, and was the largest water park in Northern California. On September 6, 2023, it was announced via Raging Waters San Jose's social media that the park would not be reopening for the 2024 season.

On May 10, 2024, it was announced that the lease for the site was acquired by California Dreamin' Entertainment, a subsidiary of Silverwood Entertainment Holdings LLC, and that the water park would reopen as CaliBunga Waterpark.

The park reopened on July 4th, five days after the original planned opening date of June 29th.

In June 2026 the city of San Jose announced that the CaliBunga water park would close and probably be torn down.

=== Raging Waters Salt Lake City ===
Until early 2011, there was also a Raging Waters park in Salt Lake City, Utah, later operated as Seven Peaks Salt Lake. The Raging Waters/Seven Peaks park in Salt Lake City would close down in 2018 with the site being demolished in 2021.
