= Miguelita Creek =

Creek in California, United States

Coordinates: 37.3816064°N 121.8216201°W

Miguelita Creek, originating in East Foothills, California, above the San Jose Country Club, is a tributary of Lower Silver Creek, which is a tributary of Coyote Creek, a river in Santa Clara County, California.

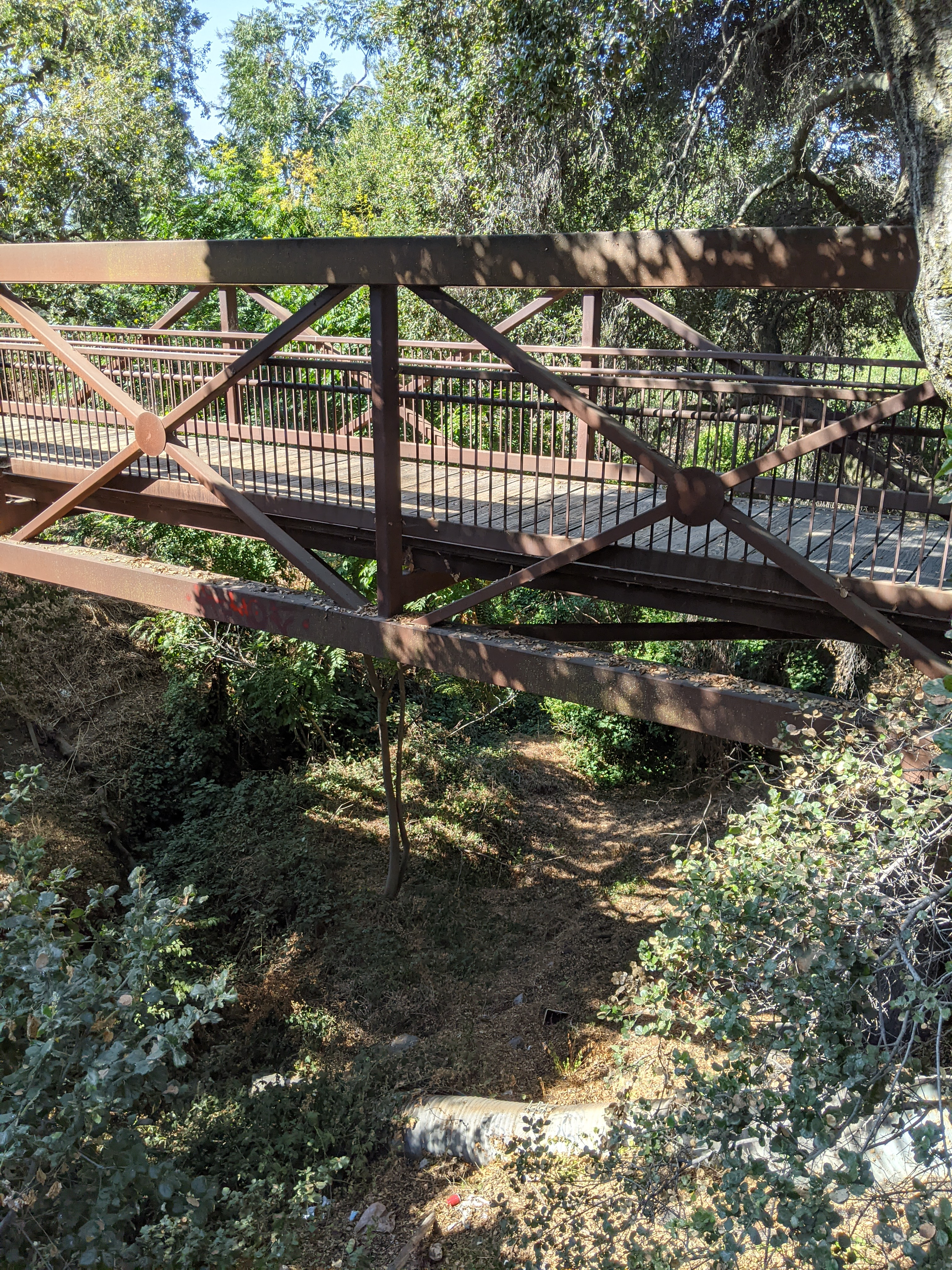
View from Alum Rock Road

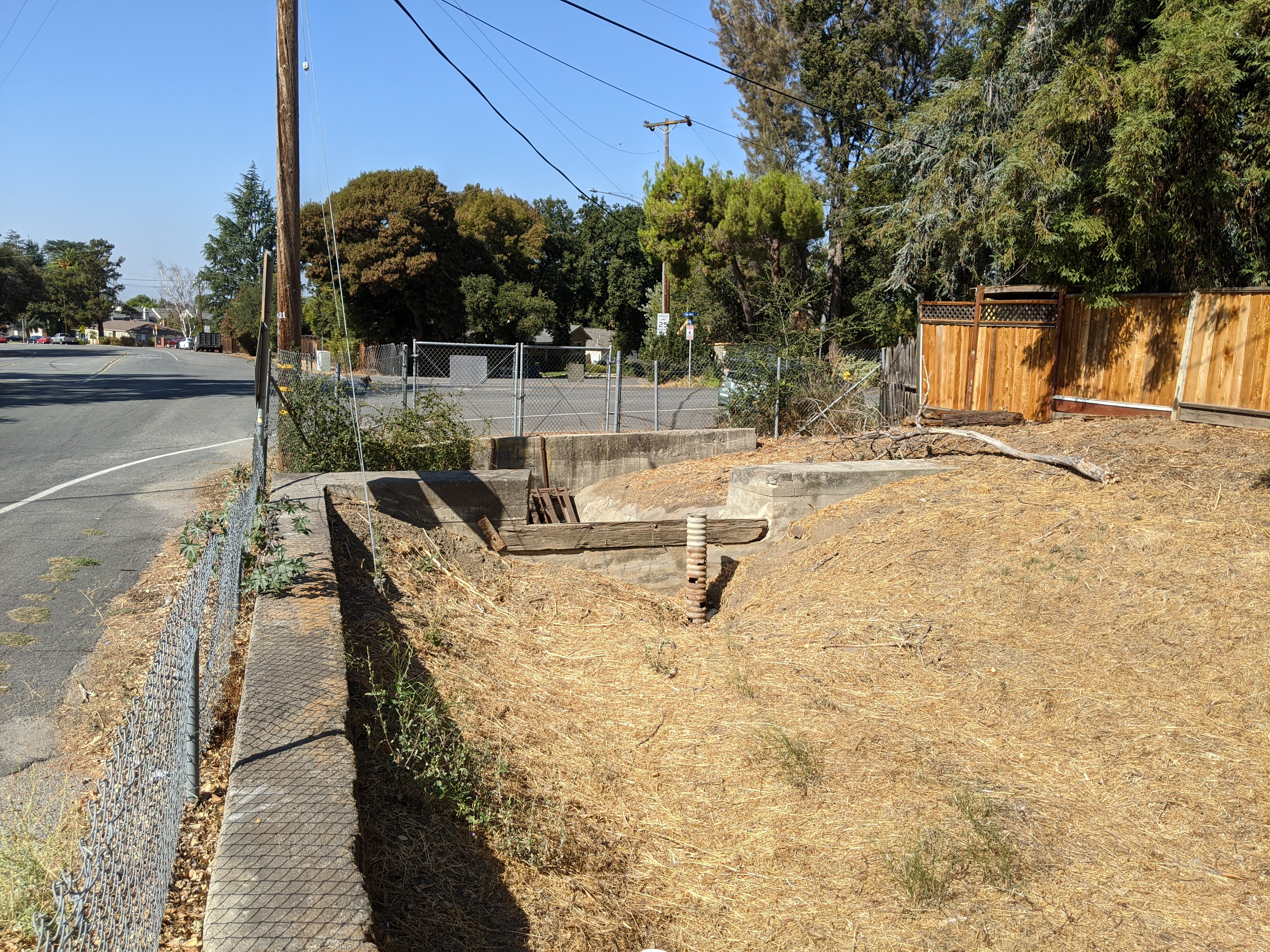
Into the culvert at Fairway Drive

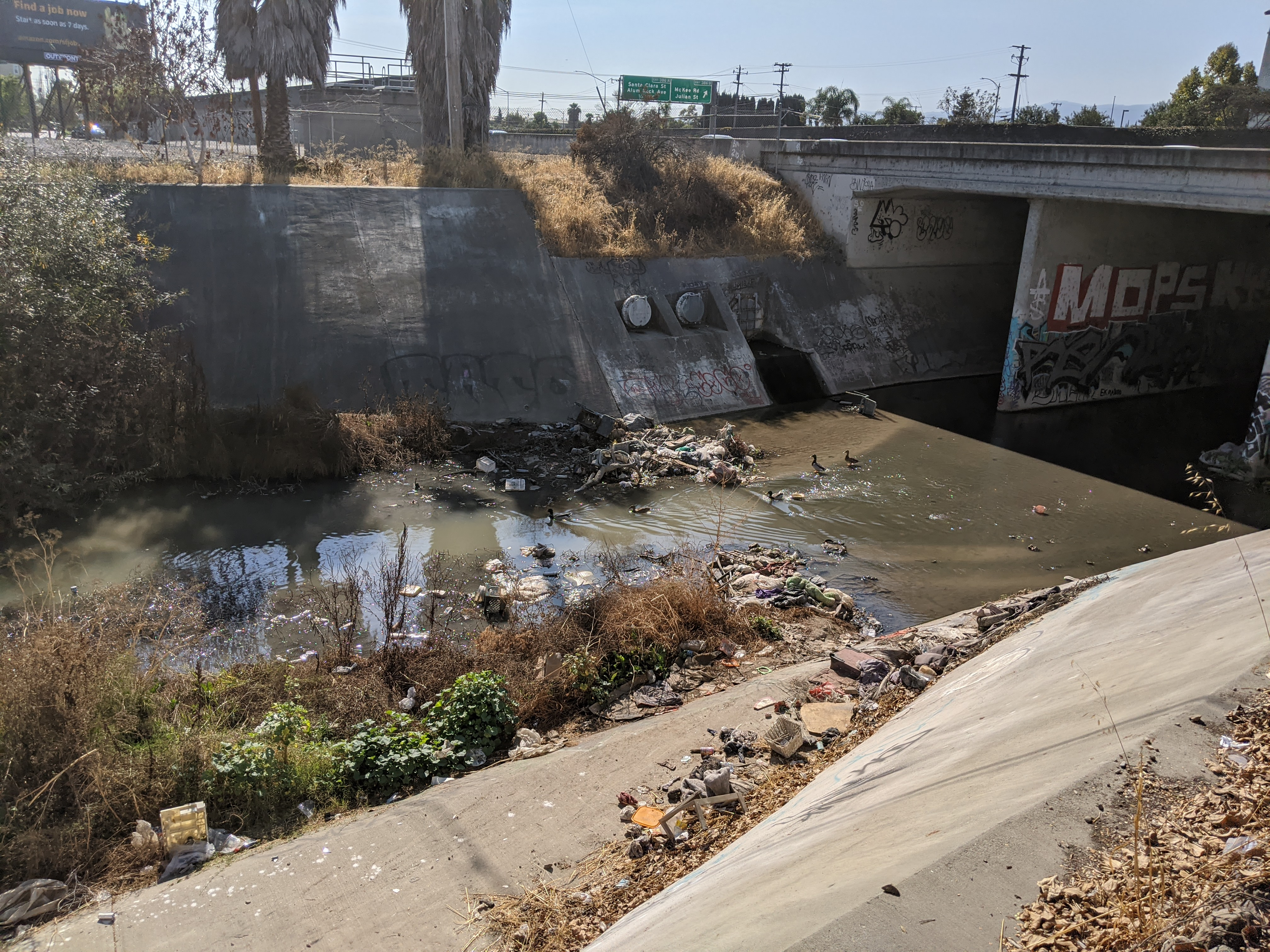
After merge with Lower Silver Creek, into the culvert under US 101

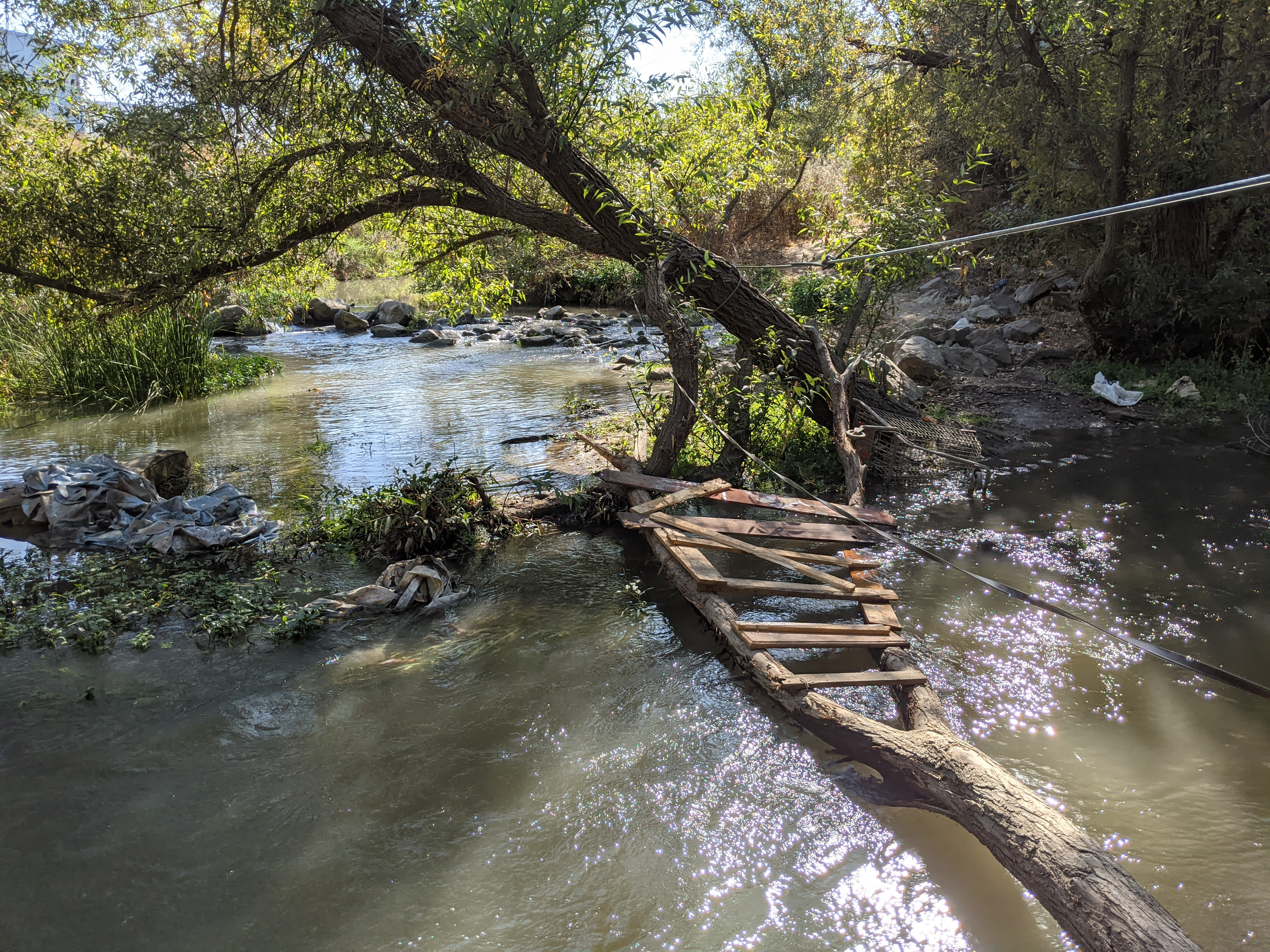
Confluence with Coyote Creek at Watson Park
