= Alum Rock Airport =

Former airport in what is now San Jose, California, United States

- IATA: none; ICAO: none

Summary
- Location: Alum Rock, California
- Built: 1919
- Coordinates: 37.365233°N 121.836727°W
- Interactive map of Alum Rock Airport

Runways
Direction	Length		Surface
Direction	ft	m	Surface
Unknown	1,800	549	Grass

Alum Rock Airport was an early airport in the former town of Alum Rock, now within the city limits of San Jose, California, near the intersection of Alum Rock Avenue and Capitol Avenue. The airport was established in 1919 by Reserve Lieutenant Johnny Johnston after returning from World War I. Much of the early aerial photography of the then-rural Santa Clara Valley was taken on flights from the Alum Rock Airport.

A 1936 edition of the federal Airport Facility Directory (A/FD) described the Alum Rock Airport as having one runway of 1,800 feet (550 m), a hangar with "San Jose" painted on the roof (to help pilots navigate), and facilities to service aircraft.

The events in the decline of the airport are not clearly documented. A lawsuit by neighbors in 1928 eventually led to relocation of the operation. Johnston was killed in a crash of an air mail flight in 1932 at age 34. The airport was still listed as existing in the Alum Rock location in the 1936 A/FD.

Today reminders of the airport are visible in suburban city streets of San Jose's Alum Rock district. A minor residential street called Pala Avenue is located approximately at the original runway. The oddly-named cross streets, Avenues A, B and C, are believed to be named for lettered airport Taxiways A, B and C upon which they were constructed.

Air transportation for that vicinity today is served by Reid–Hillview Airport, established in 1937, and San Jose International Airport, established as San Jose Municipal Airport in 1945.
