= Lake Cunningham =

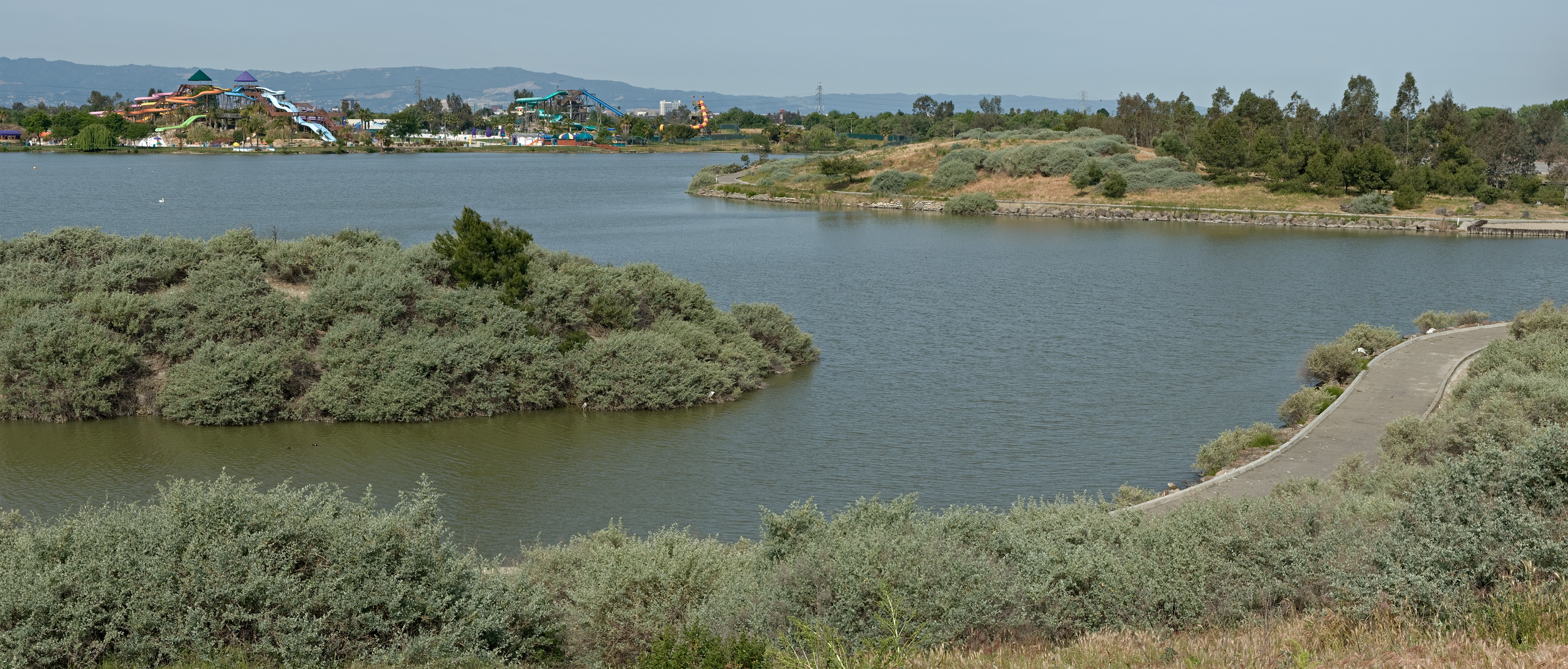

- Location within California Location within the United States
- Location: East San Jose, California
- Coordinates: 37.336615°N 121.808317°W
- Type: Retention basin
- Primary inflows: Thompson Creek
- Primary outflows: Lower Silver Creek
- Basin countries: United States
- Water volume: 590 acre-feet (730,000 m^{3})

Lake Cunningham is an artificial lake in Lake Cunningham Park, in East San Jose, California, near the Eastridge Mall and Eastridge Transit Center. Although not a geological feature recognized in the Geographic Names Information System (GNIS), it serves as retention basin for Thompson Creek floodwaters. It is located on Capitol Expressway and stands next to Reid–Hillview Airport. The Lake Cunningham Skate Park and Raging Waters theme park are also in Lake Cunningham Park.

The Lake Cunningham–Eastridge Mall area was one of Santa Clara Valley's three permanent wetland complexes called "lagunas". The area was called Laguna Socayre (or Secayre) during the initial Euro-American settlement (1769–1850), and was part of the Rancho Yerba Buena or Rancho Socayre land grant of 1833. Laguna Socayre covered a much larger area than Lake Cunningham Park does now. Its outflow is Lower Silver Creek.

Due to intense urbanization in the surrounding hill areas, the storm water that historically exited the canyons and percolated through the gravel below ground was channeled into pipes below the streets to Thompson Creek and Lake Cunningham. This has led to an increase in runoff during the winter storms.

The lake and park are named after James Farnham Cunningham who owned the land before the city acquired it for flood control.

== Gallery ==
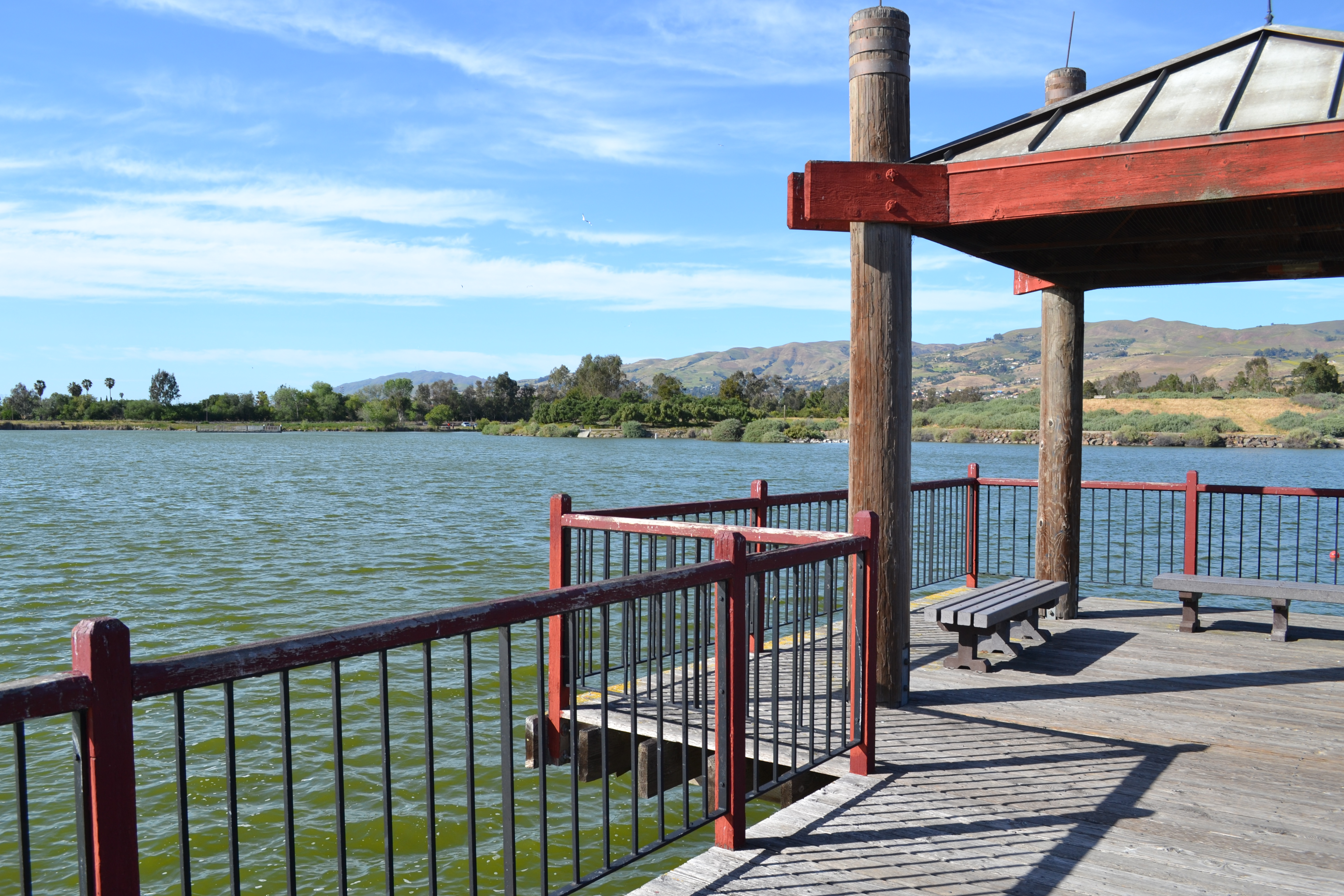

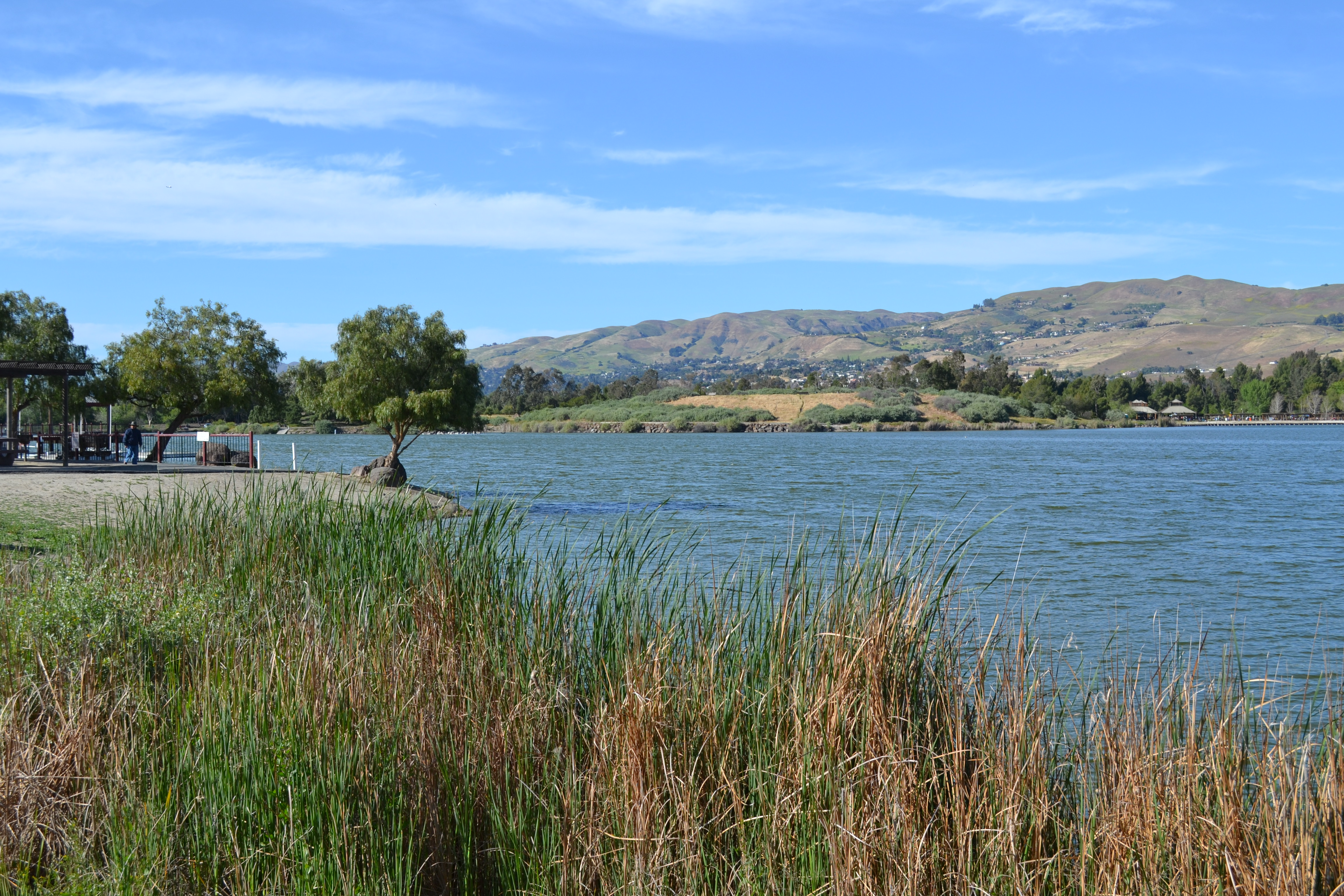

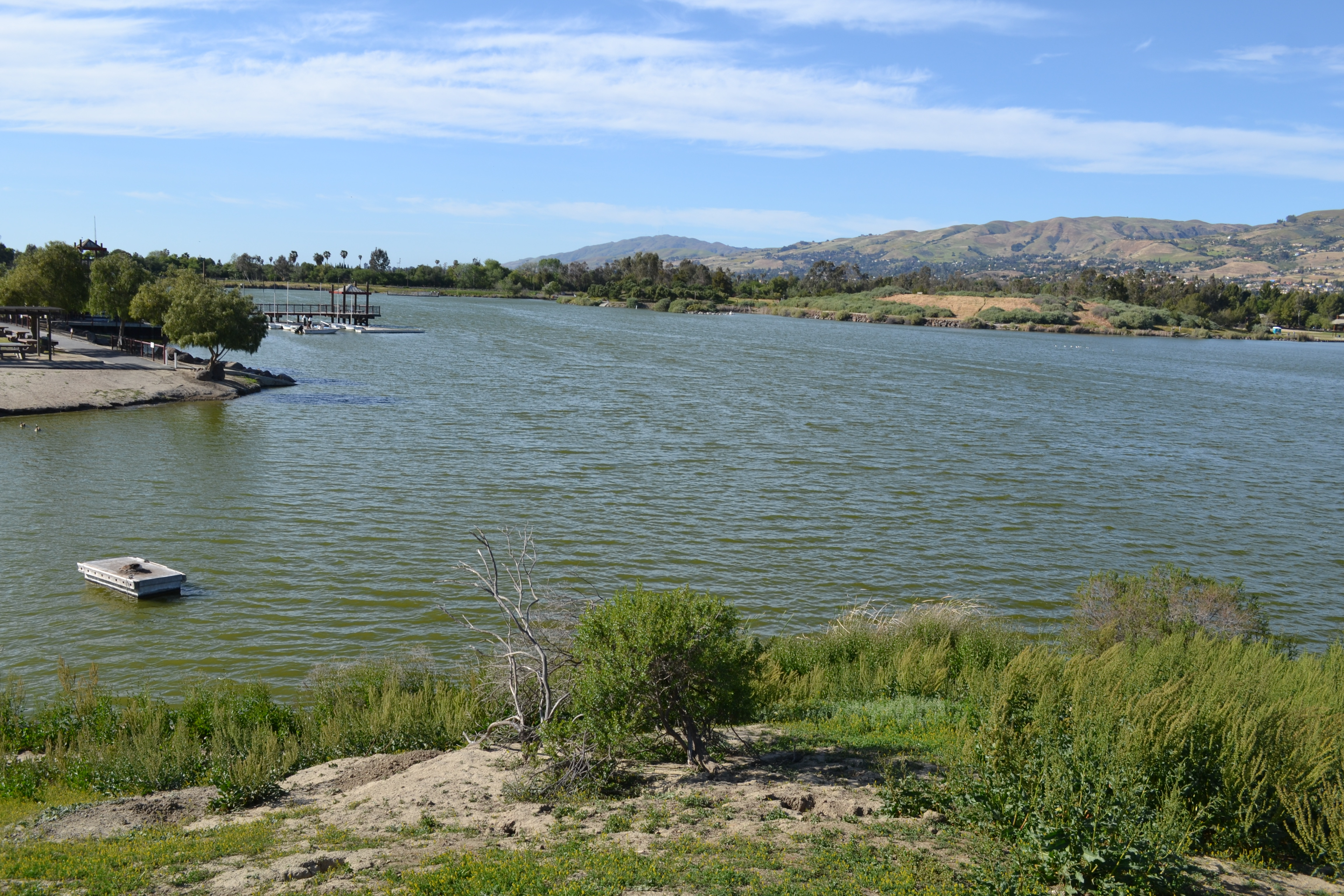

== See also ==
- List of lakes in California
- List of lakes in the San Francisco Bay Area
