= Rod Machado =

Rod Machado (b. 1953 in Oakland, California) is a pilot, flight instructor, and author. He is ATP rated, and is a member of the Aviation Speakers Bureau.

== Bibliography ==
- Rod Machado's Instrument Pilot's Survival Manual Aviation Speakers Bureau, 1991, Third Edition 2003 ISBN 978-0971201507
- Rod Machado's Private Pilot Handbook Aviation Speakers Bureau, 1996. ISBN 978-0963122995
- Rod Machado's Instrument Pilot's Handbook Aviation Speakers Bureau, 2007, Third Edition 2023. ISBN 978-1950288007
- Rod Machado's Private Pilot Workbook Aviation Speakers Bureau, 2008. ISBN 978-0963122971
- Rod Machado's How to Fly an Airplane Handbook Aviation Speakers Bureau, 2014. ISBN 978-0985932848
- Rod Machado's Private/Commercial Pilot Handbook Rod's Aviation Learning Center, 2023. ISBN 978-1950288014
