= Eastridge =

Coordinates: 37.325328°N 121.814089°W

Eastridge Center

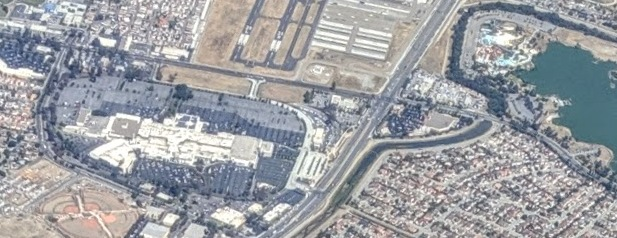
- Aerial view of Eastridge, with Lake Cunningham on the right and Reid-Hillview Airport at top
- Location: Evergreen, San Jose, California
- Address: 2200 Eastridge Loop
- Opened: May 17, 1971; 55 years ago
- Developer: Bayshore Properties (The Taubman Co.) and Homart Development Co.
- Manager: Eastridge Property Holdings, LLC.
- Owner: Jiashu Xu
- Num. of stores: 104
- Num. of anchor tenants: 7 (5 open, 2 vacant)
- Floor area: 1,229,312 square feet (114,206.8 m^{2})
- Floors: 2 (3 in Macy's)
- Website: eastridgecenter.com

Eastridge, officially Eastridge Center, is a shopping mall in San Jose, California, United States, located in the Evergreen district of East San Jose. Eastridge opened as the largest mall on the West Coast in 1971 and has been redesigned multiple times throughout its history, most recently in 2017. Eastridge serves as an important community hub in Evergreen and the larger East Side, hosting farmers markets, holiday celebrations, and community events. The anchor stores are JCPenney, Macy's, AMC Theatres, Round 1 Entertainment, and 24 Hour Fitness.

== History ==
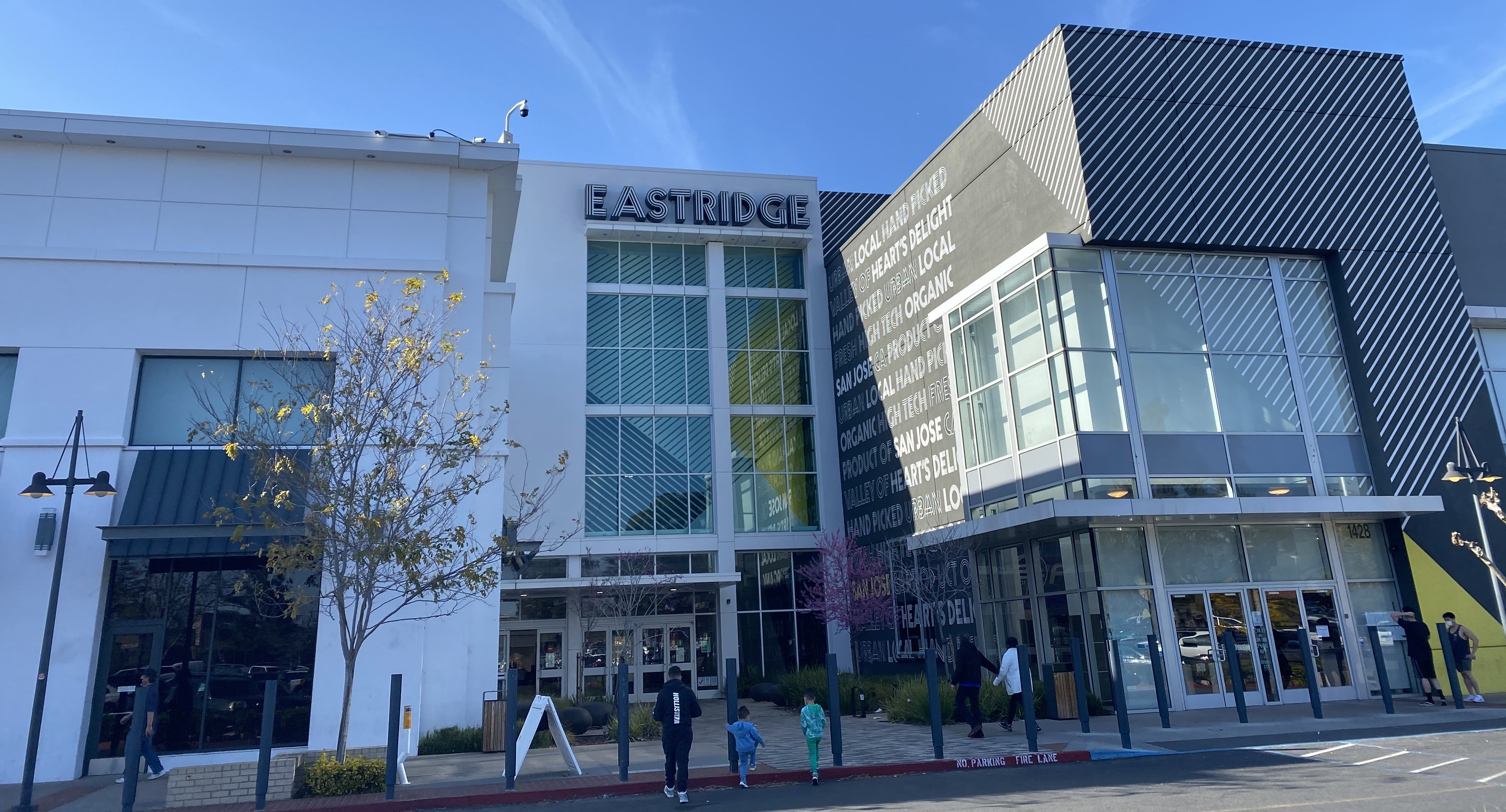
South entry (entrance C)

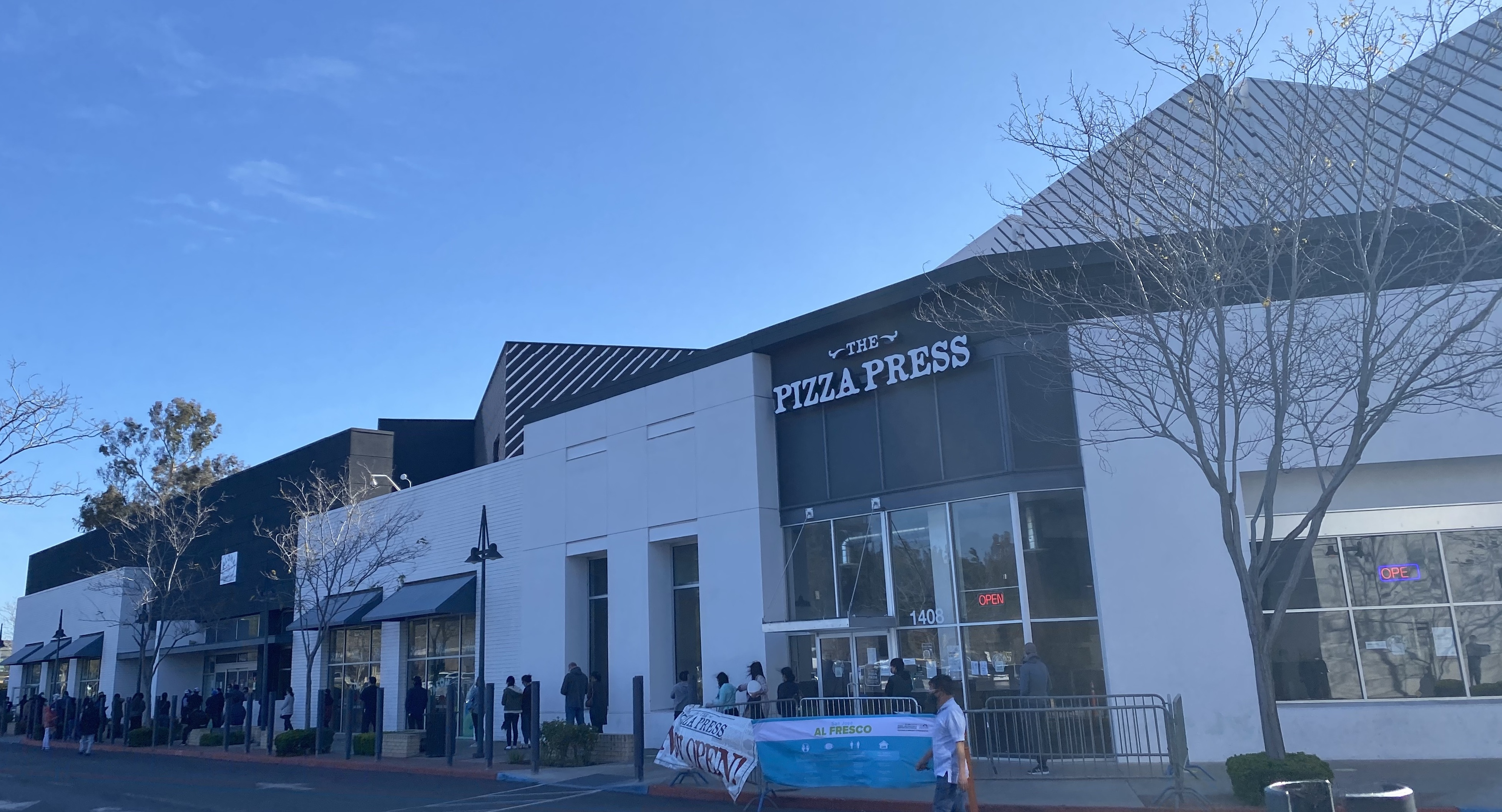
Roller rink and restaurants

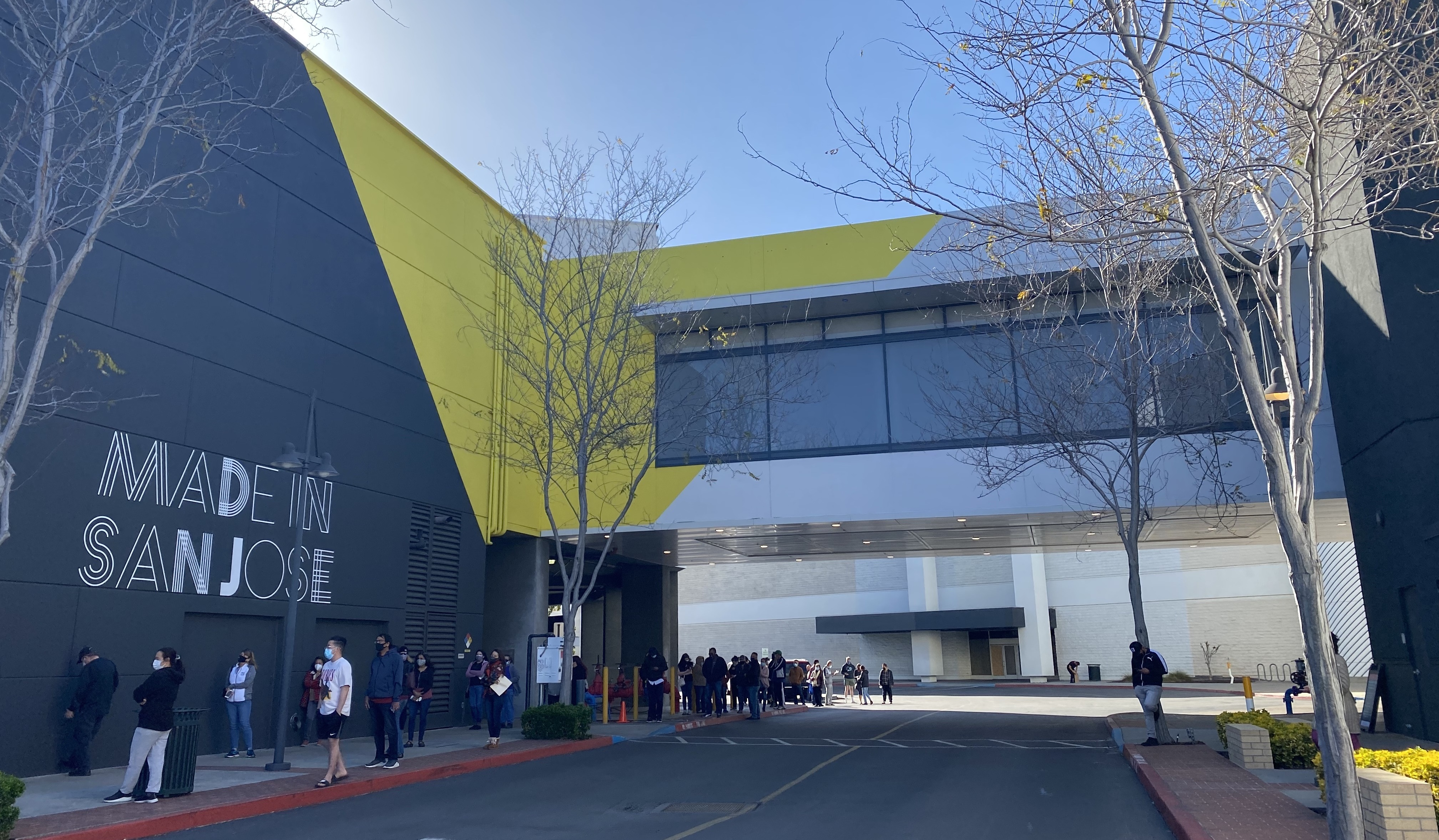
A skyway at Eastridge

The mall opened on May 17, 1971, with the original anchors of Macy's, Liberty House, J. C. Penney, Joseph Magnin Co., and Sears. Eastridge Center was the largest enclosed shopping mall in the Western United States. Emporium-Capwell replaced Liberty House when the chain pulled out of California. After Macy's bought Emporium-Capwell, the store was closed. It sat vacant until the 2005 remodel, when it was demolished.

In 1993, the Spillman Engineering 3 Abroad carousel, made c.1920 by Allan Herschell Company was restored and placed in the mall. The carousel has been listed on the National Register of Historic Places since 2000.

In February 2012, two teenage boys were stabbed and left in critical condition at the mall, which led to J. C. Penney and Macy's closing temporarily.

In the wake of the 2012 Aurora, Colorado, shooting, a mysterious package was thrown into an AMC theater at Eastridge during a showing of The Dark Knight Rises, which led to an evacuation of the theater.

On July 20, 2012, a fire broke out near the mall at a homeless encampment in a 100-by-100 ft area, but was extinguished before the fire could reach any buildings.

On January 15, 2016, a joint adventure between Pacific Retail Capital Partners and Silverpeak Real Estate Partners acquired the mall from GGP for $225 million, excluding the Sears and Macy's stores. The new owners announced that they will invest approximately $15 million to upgrade the mall. In March 2017, a renovation of the mall was announced.

In December 2017, it was announced that Barnes & Noble would close its store in the mall in January 2018. On November 7, 2019, it was announced that Sears would be closing this location as part of a plan to close 96 stores nationwide. The store closed on February 2, 2020.

In 2017, Eastridge underwent its most recent and largest renovation. As part of the renovation, the Eastridge Murals were painted.

In January 2024, Jiashu Xu purchased Eastridge for $135 million from Pacific Retail.

== Eastridge Murals ==
As part of the major renovation of Eastridge in 2017, the four Eastridge Murals were commissioned, which constitute the world's largest murals on a shopping center. The four murals cover a total of 20,000 square feet of artwork and carried out by four different artists: Aaron de la Cruz, Brendan Monroe, CYRCLE, and Lila Gemellos.

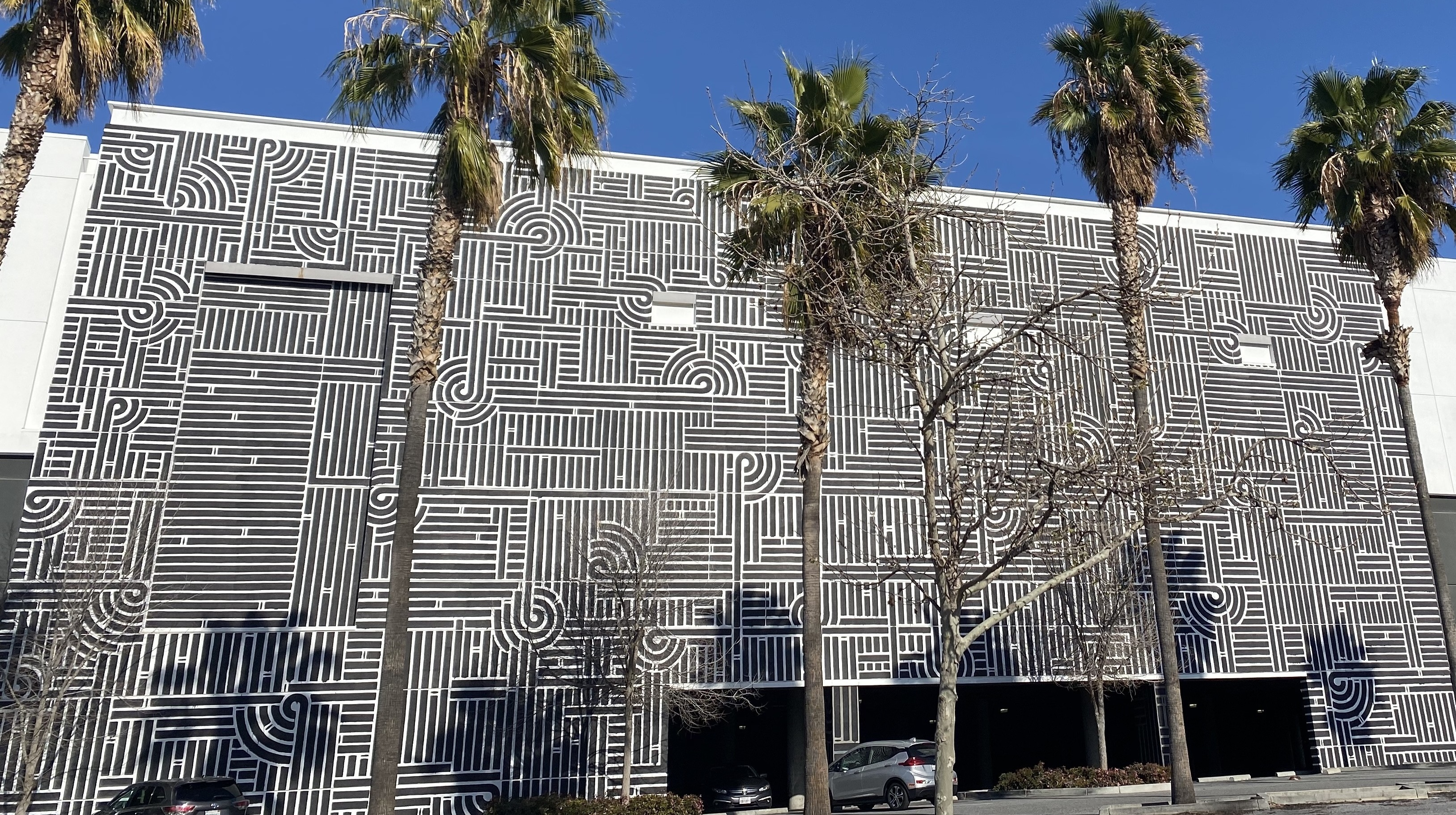
Mural by Aaron de la Cruz

== Location ==
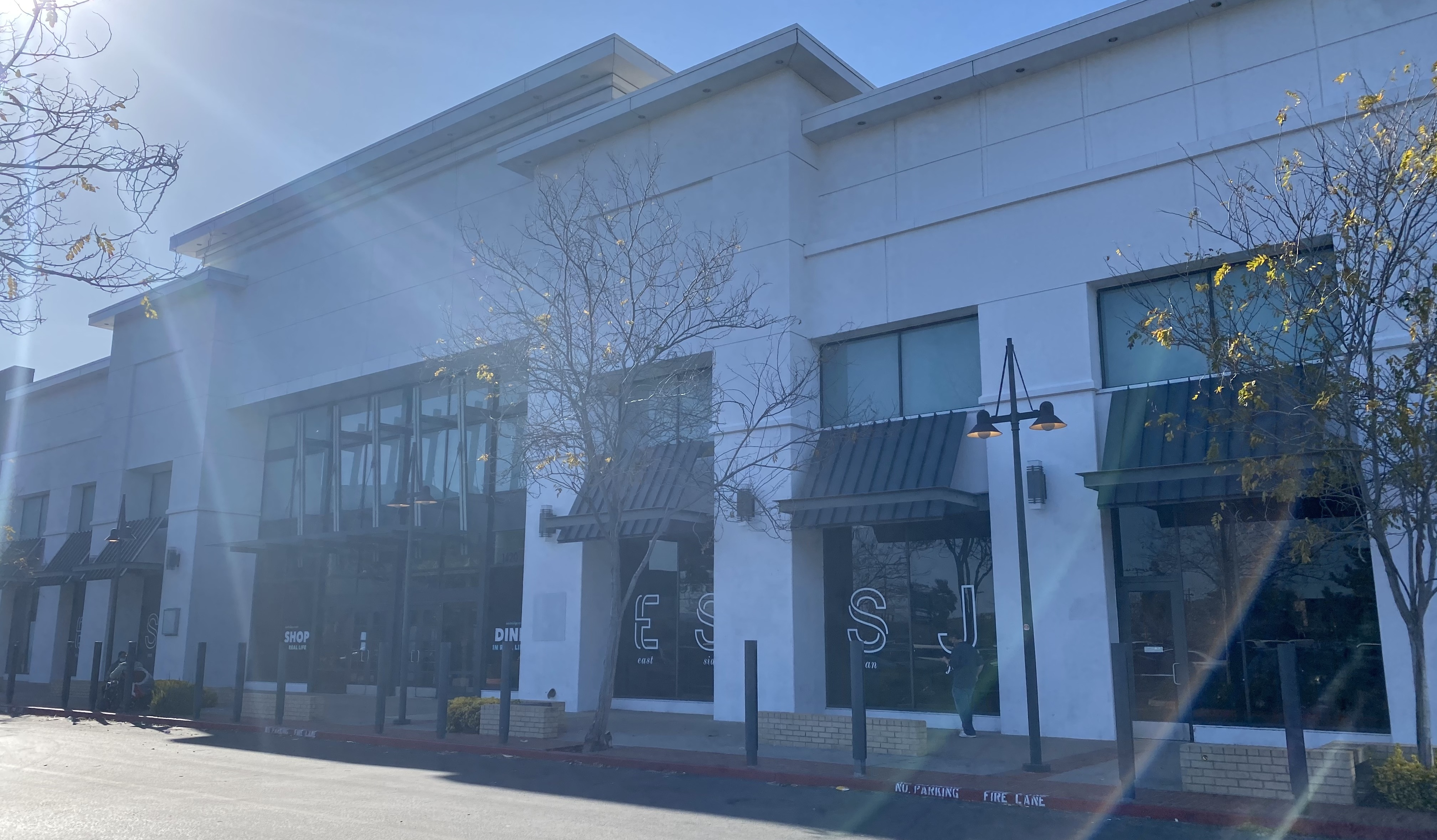
Shops at Eastridge

Eastridge is located in the Evergreen district of East San Jose. It is bound on the east by the Capitol Expressway. Nearby landmarks include Lake Cunningham and Raging Waters San Jose.

Reid-Hillview Airport is located north of Eastridge, across Tully Road.

== Transportation ==
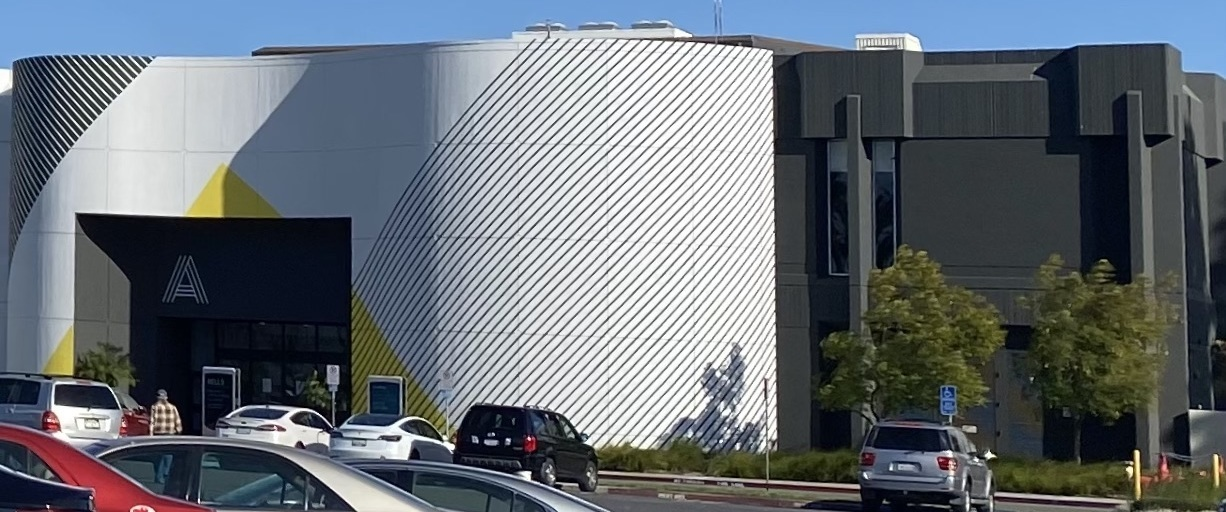
North entry (entrance A)

The Santa Clara Valley Transportation Authority (VTA) operates the Eastridge Transit Center on the northeast edge of the mall along Capitol Expressway. In 2029, Eastridge will be serviced by VTA Light Rail with the opening of the 2.4 mile (3.9 km) extension of the Orange Line.

== In popular culture ==
- A scene from Robert Redford's The Candidate (1972) was filmed at Eastridge.
- Several scenes of Logan's Run (1976) were filmed at Eastridge.
