= Rancho Yerba Buena =

Mexican land grant in California

Coordinates: 37.290°N 121.770°W

Rancho Yerba Buena or Rancho Socayre was a 24,332-acre (98.47 km^{2}) Mexican land grant in present-day Santa Clara County, California given in 1833 by Governor José Figueroa to Antonio Chaboya (also spelled Chavoya or Chabolla). The grant was between Coyote Creek on the west and the foothills, and encompassed present day Evergreen neighborhood of southeast San José.

== History ==
Francisco Xavier Antonio Chaboya (1803–1865) was the son of De Anza Expedition soldier Marcos Chaboya, and a brother of Anastasio Chaboya, grantee of Rancho Sanjon de los Moquelumnes. Antonio Chaboya married his first wife Maria Juliana Feliciana Rosario Buitron in 1826. After her death, he married Maria Ramona Encarnacion Higuera in 1846.

With the cession of California to the United States following the Mexican–American War, the 1848 Treaty of Guadalupe Hidalgo provided that the land grants would be honored. As required by the Land Act of 1851, a claim for Rancho Yerba Buena was filed with the Public Land Commission in 1852, and the grant was patented to Antonio Chaboya in 1859.

Gustave Touchard (1818–1888) bought part of Rancho Yerba Buena from Chaboya. Touchard was a San Francisco furniture dealer, and president of the Union Insurance Company from 1866 to 1888. During a lengthy court proceeding regarding a boundary dispute, squatters settled on portions of the property. In 1861, San Jose sheriff Murphy evicted the squatters. Antonio Chaboya died in 1865, leaving the property to his family. His son, Francisco Chaboya, and nephew, Salvador Chaboya (1837–) were named as executors of the will.

The marshy area of the rancho known as Laguna Socayre was drained for farmland, and is now the site of Lake Cunningham Park and Eastridge Mall in San José; Lake Cunningham serves as a storm water retention basin.
