= Reid–Hillview Airport =

General aviation airport in San Jose, California, United States

Reid–Hillview Airport of Santa Clara County
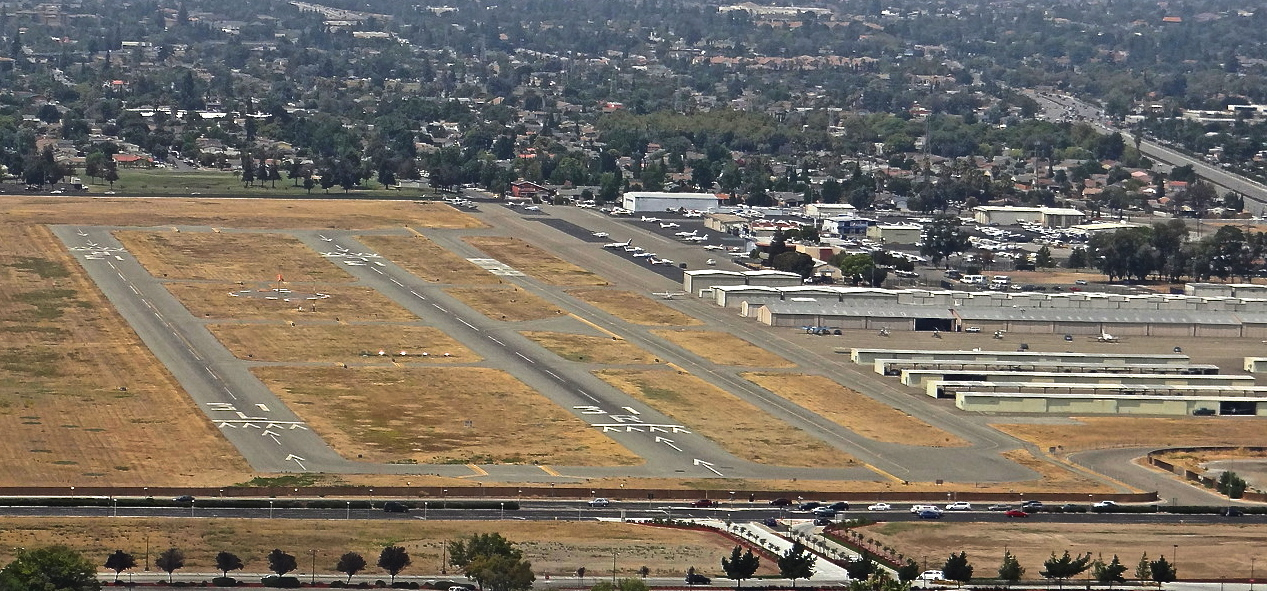
- View of the airport from the south.
- IATA: RHV; ICAO: KRHV; FAA LID: RHV

Summary
- Airport type: Public
- Owner: Santa Clara County
- Serves: San Francisco Bay Area
- Location: San Jose, California, U.S.
- Elevation AMSL: 40.5 m (133 ft)
- Coordinates: 37°19′58″N 121°49′11″W

Maps
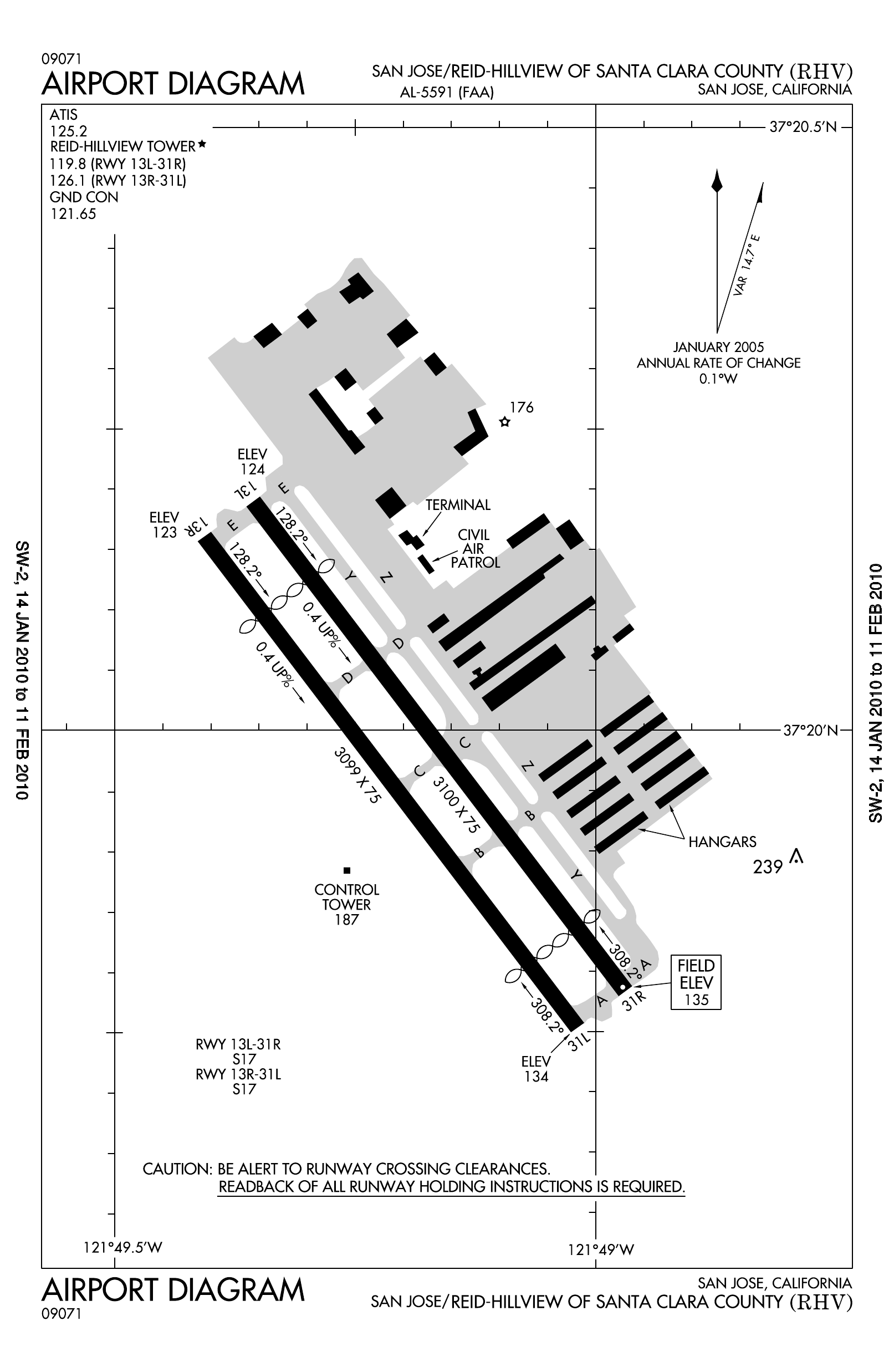
- FAA airport diagram
- Interactive map of Reid–Hillview Airport of Santa Clara County

Runways
Direction	Length		Surface
Direction	ft	m	Surface
13L/31R	3,100	945	Asphalt
13R/31L	3,099	945	Asphalt

Reid–Hillview Airport of Santa Clara County (IATA: RHV, ICAO: KRHV, FAA LID: RHV) is in the eastern part of San Jose, in Santa Clara County, California, United States. Santa Clara County owns it and is near the Evergreen district of San Jose where aviation pioneer John J. Montgomery experimented with gliders in 1911. Reid–Hillview Airport was also the official general aviation airport for the 2016 Super Bowl in Levi's Stadium (in nearby Santa Clara, CA).

Reid–Hillview is a general aviation airport; with no scheduled airline service. As with most general aviation airports air charter operations are available. The airport has a control tower that operates from 07:00 to 22:00 local time. The FAA classifies Reid–Hillview as a reliever airport for San Jose International Airport (SJC).

== History ==
Groundbreaking for Reid–Hillview airport came in 1937. Bob and Cecil Reid built the Garden City Airport in 1935, which was quickly closed to make room for U.S. Route 101. Their second site was northwest of the Hillview golf course, hence the name. Until 1946, the single runway was unpaved.

Reid–Hillview was a single runway airport until 1965, when a second runway was added. The control tower opened in October 1967.

The airport was the origin for an emergency supply airlift to the Watsonville Municipal Airport following the 1989 Loma Prieta earthquake, after mountain and coastal roads were blocked, cutting off Santa Cruz and Watsonville from relief efforts by ground. The Watsonville Airport estimates that it received 100 short tons (91 t) of supplies via the airlift during the week following the quake. John McAvoy and Bill Dunn of the Reid–Hillview Airport Association received the 1990 Grand Award from the Bay Area's Metropolitan Transportation Commission for organizing the airlift. The airport continues to be used in emergency operations, including during the SCU Lightning Complex fires in 2020.

Santa Clara County published an over 120-page master plan proposing improvements and expansions at Reid–Hillview. In the mid-2000s, the county announced they would demolish the second story of the airport terminal to make room for new offices for airport administration. They failed to follow up on this plan, and the second story has been sitting idle ever since. In the document, the county also planned on adding small expansions to the runway to allow turboprops and small business jets to land. Although turboprops and small business jets still land in the current runway, this minor expansion will allow a larger flow of these types of aircraft to land.

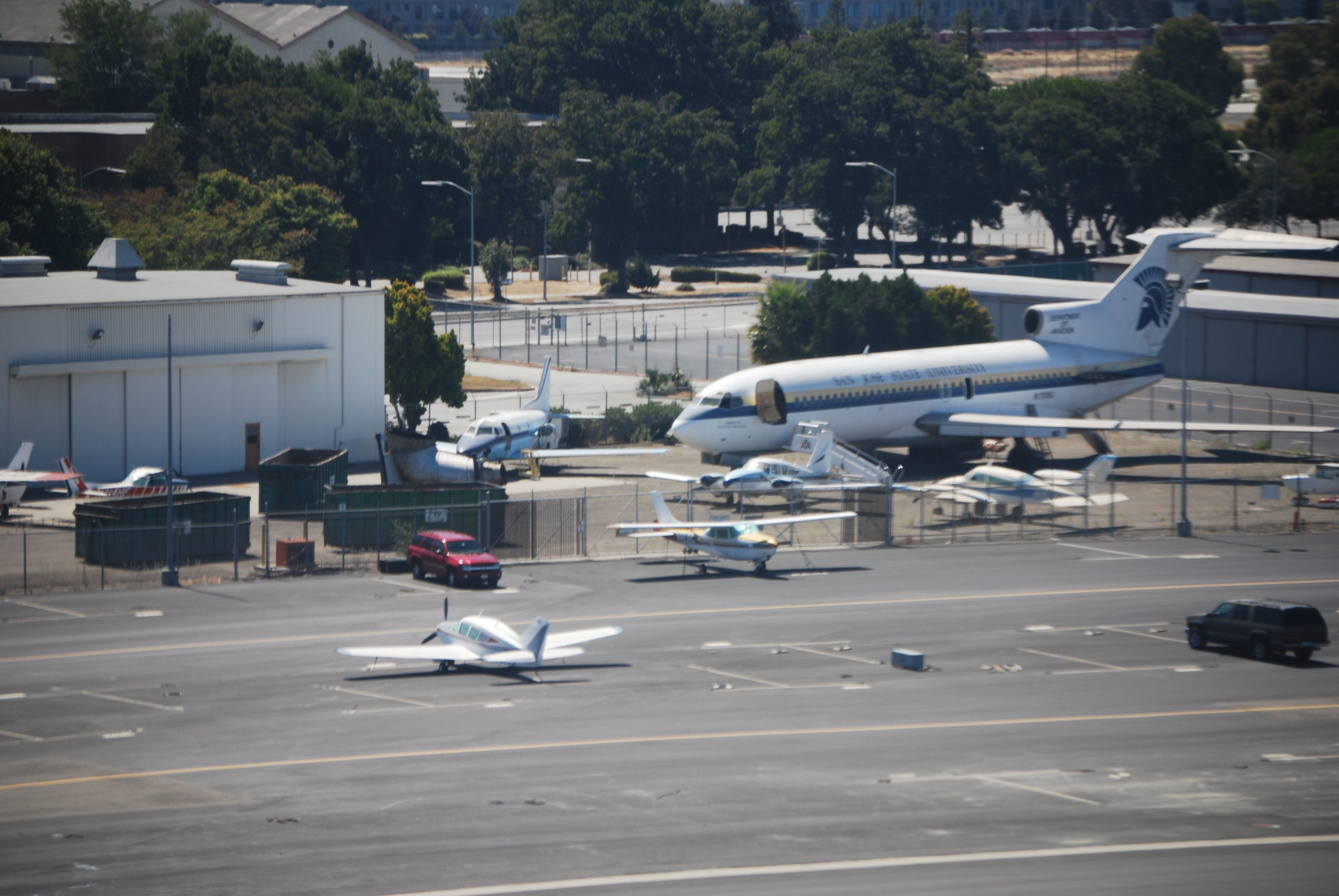
San Jose State University's aviation department at Reid Hillview Airport in 2010, with the department's retired Boeing 727.

In 2010, San Jose State University's aviation program relocated to Reid–Hillview. The university operates out of the Swift Building, where it holds classes during the academic year.

In 2018, the Board of Supervisors voted to study consolidating general aviation at San Martin Airport. On December 4, 2018, and again the following year, the board voted against accepting additional Federal Aviation Administration (FAA) funding that would have been contingent on Reid–Hillview's continued operation through 2051. Previously accepted grants require the county to keep the airport open through 2031. In November 2020, it voted to begin the process of closing the airport in 2031 and redeveloping the land.

Between 2019 and 2020, Santa Clara County undertook a community process to explore possible future uses for the airport site, resulting in a draft Reid–Hillview Vision Plan with the following vision statement:

This East San Jose neighborhood will be a place of empowerment built on our culture, diversity and history, and sustained by education, well-being, and economic opportunity for the community.

In August 2021, Santa Clara County released a study that found elevated blood lead levels in children living near the airport. On August 16, 2021, airport officials responded to the study by announcing that fixed base operators would switch to unleaded aviation fuel. After which Santa Clara County's supervisor, Cindy Chavez, testified at the United States House Oversight Subcommittee on Environment in opposition of the national use of leaded aviation fuel. The hearing resulted in the committee committing to declaring leaded aviation fuel a health hazard by 2023. On August 18, the Board of Supervisors voted unanimously to close the airport as soon as the FAA approves of its closure, which would be no sooner than January 1, 2022, and mandate the use of unleaded fuel as soon as possible. The board also voted against funding an expansion of San Martin Airport, raising concerns that general aviation traffic would be diverted to San Jose International Airport, which is also capacity-constrained and surrounded by urban development, including the low-income, minority Washington-Guadalupe and Alviso neighborhoods.

== Environmental impact ==
For years, local activists have pushed to close the airport, supported by Santa Clara County Supervisors Blanca Alvarado and Cindy Chavez. Residents and officials have cited the airport's proximity to 21 schools and childcare centers as a concern due to the airport's use of 100LL avgas, which contains lead. Activists consider the airport's continued operation to be an example of environmental racism in the United States, arguing that 97% of the adjacent East San Jose neighborhood at risk of lead poisoning identifies as predominantly non white, predominantly low-income Latino and Vietnamese-American residents. This study also discussed the national use of leaded aviation fuel in piston-engined aircraft, contributing to 70% of airborne lead.

A 2021 study by Dr. Sammy Zahran found unsafe levels of lead in the air above the southeastern side of the airport, exceeding the acceptable limit set by the National Ambient Air Quality Standards; in response, that side of the airport was closed to visitors. A study commissioned by the county and released in August 2021 found elevated blood lead levels in children living within a 1.5 miles radius of the airport. The study found that children in the affected region experienced blood lead levels of 0.83 micrograms per deciliter. This is nearly double the blood lead levels of children during the Flint water crisis, which were around 0.45 micrograms per deciliter. Nationally, over 360,000 children live in neighborhoods surround airports which use leaded aviation fuel.

== Fixed-base operators (FBOs) ==
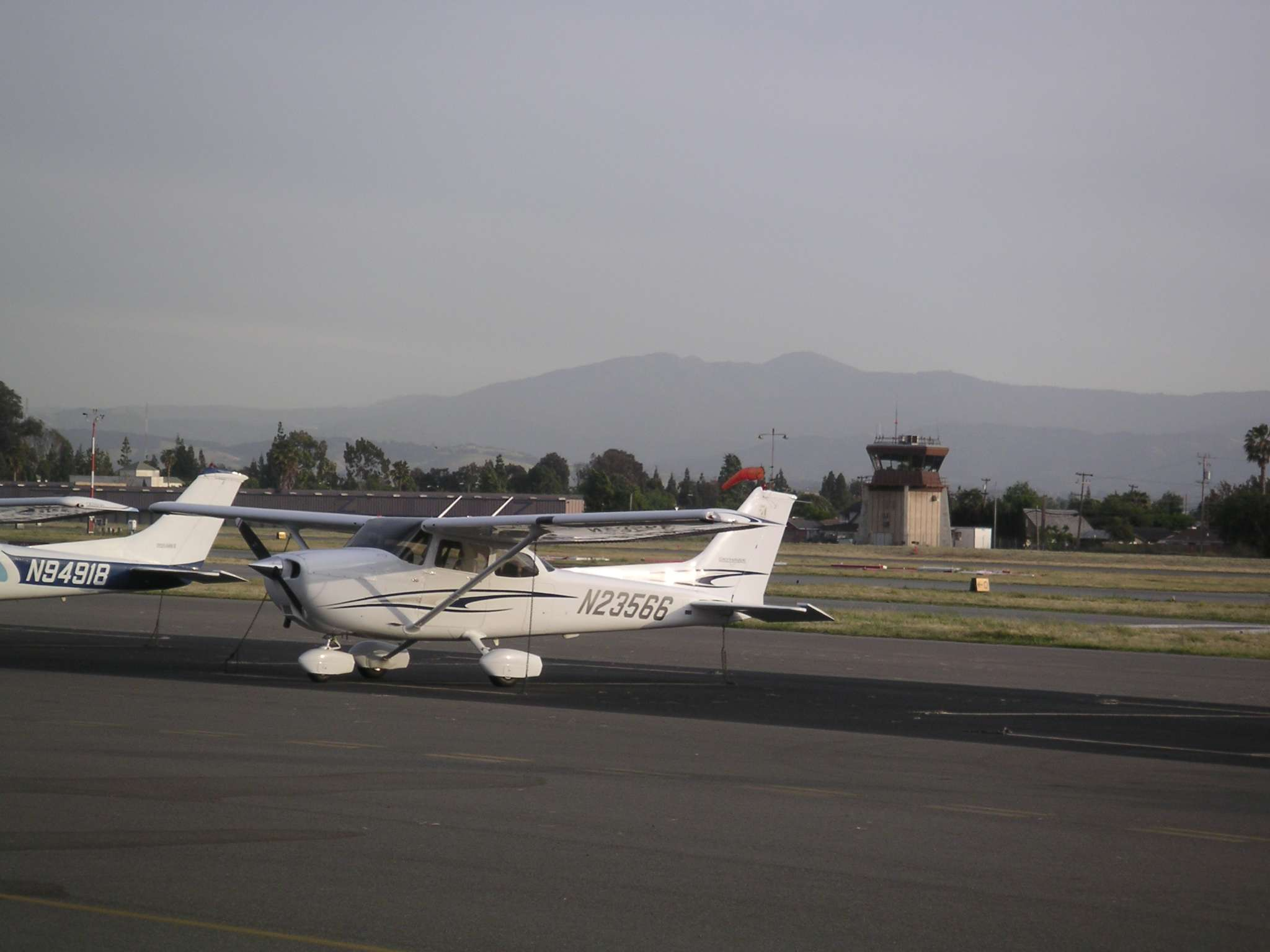
Overlooking transient parking and the control tower

At Reid–Hillview, fixed-base operators (FBOs) compete for fuel sales, aircraft rentals and/or flight training.

- AeroDynamic Aviation, formerly Amelia Reid Aviation
- Air Accord
- The Flying 20's
- Nice Air Aviation
- San Jose Fuel Company
- Squadron 2 Flying Club
- Trade Winds Aviation
- Victory Aero Maintenance

== Ground transportation ==
Capitol Expressway (County Route G21) is at the entrance to the airport at Cunningham Avenue.

=== Rental cars/taxi ===
Enterprise car rental is available on the field next to the Airport Shoppe.

=== Bus ===
The Santa Clara Valley Transportation Authority (VTA) has its Eastridge Transit Center across Tully Road at Eastridge Mall, about a half-mile walk southbound along Capitol Expressway.

VTA runs bus rapid transit from the Diridon train station in downtown San Jose to the Eastridge Transit Center. Construction has also started on a light rail extension from the Alum Rock station to Eastridge.

=== Other airport amenities ===
As of 2016, Reid–Hillview Airport had vending machines, a pilot's lounge and break room. Santa Clara County passed a new law stating the terminal would no longer allow unhealthy food or drinks to be sold inside. This meant that coffee and all the vending machines that used to be there would no longer exist in the terminal. Now, all that remains is a water drinking fountain and bathrooms. However, there is still a seating area inside the terminal.

== Accidents and incidents ==
- On June 29, 2026, an experimental gyrocopter crashed near the southside of the airport, injuring the two occupants on board. Due to the accident's proximity to the Eastridge Shopping Center, community concerns over the airport's location reignited, with renewed calls to shut the facility down.
- On October 17, 2026, a Cessna 177 Cardinal crash-landed onto Capitol Expressway shortly after taking off from the airport. The three occupants on board suffered minor injuries.

== See also ==
- Alum Rock Airport, historical airport nearby in Alum Rock from 1919 to approximately 1936
- Amelia Reid
- List of attractions in Silicon Valley
- Palo Alto Airport
- San Jose International Airport
- San Martin Airport
