= Montgomery Hill Park =

Park in the Evergreen District of San Jose, California

Coordinates: 37°18′10″N 121°45′27″W

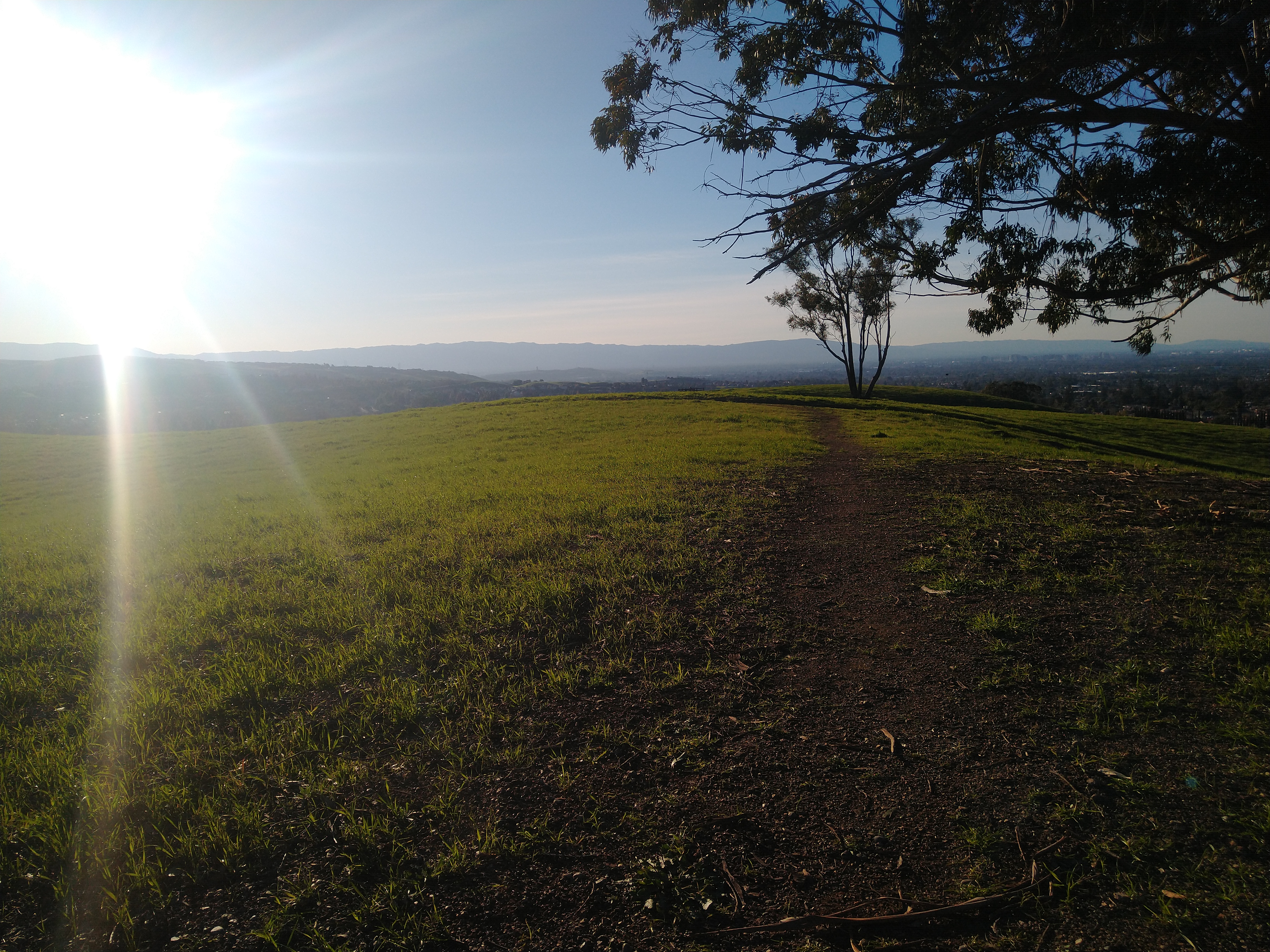
- View from Montgomery Hill Trail
- Type: Hill, trail.
- Location: Evergreen, San Jose, California, United States
- Area: 10 acres (4.0 ha)
- Website: San Jose Parks page

Montgomery Hill, named after John Joseph Montgomery, is a park located in the Evergreen District of San Jose, California. Montgomery Hill overlooks Evergreen Valley College, which has an observatory adjacent to the park. The park contains an unpaved trail system that extends for 1.2 miles along Evergreen Creek and loops along the peak of the hill for around 0.4 miles. Along the paths are interpretive signs, which cover the history of John Joseph Montgomery, who used the hill to test and launch his glider.

== History ==
In October, 1911, John Joseph Montgomery and his mechanic Joseph Vierra laid a wooden track on or around what would become Montgomery hill, using it to launch his new monoplane glider, Evergreen, which is named after the Evergreen District. Throughout October 17–31, Montgomery and Vierra had flown the Evergreen successfully 55 times, which Cornelius Reinhardt would take photos using Vierra's camera. On October 31, Montgomery stalled and crashed the Evergreen, striking his head against an exposed bolt, leading to his death.

In 1960, Richard E. Nieman, along with California State Senator John F. Thompson and a photographer found the hill where Montgomery launched his gliders by comparing the photos taken by Cornelius Reinhardt to the landscape until they found one that looked identical. With Thompson's help, on September 12, 1966, the hill was named Montgomery Hill and declared a historical landmark by the County of Santa Clara.

The master plan for Montgomery Hill park, leading to the creation of the trails on and around the Hill, was submitted to San Jose's city council on December 17, 1979.
