= Evergreen Valley =

Evergreen Valley may refer to:

- Evergreen Valley College, a community college in San Jose, California, U.S.
- Evergreen Valley High School, San Jose, California, U.S.
- Evergreen, San Jose, the neighborhood containing the aforementioned schools.
