= Silver Creek Valley =

- Neighborhood of San Jose
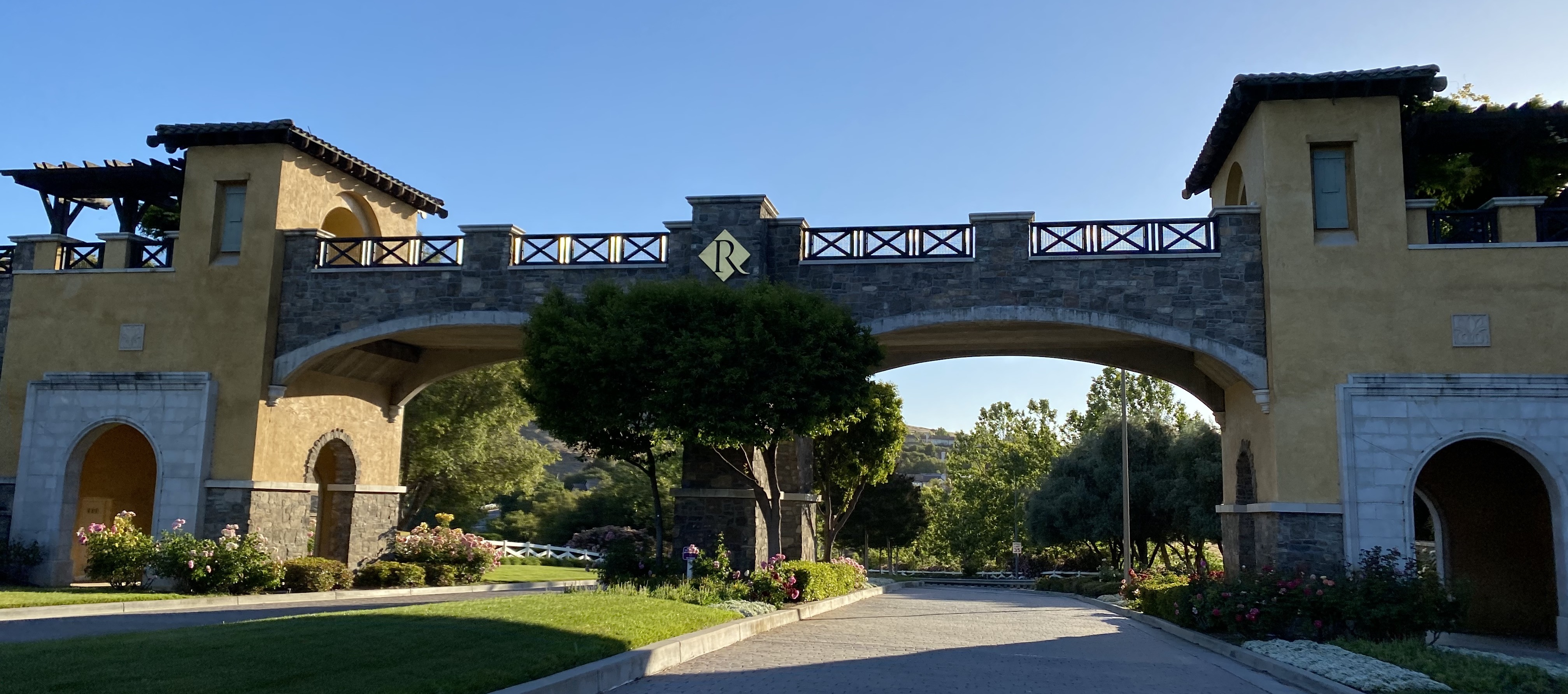
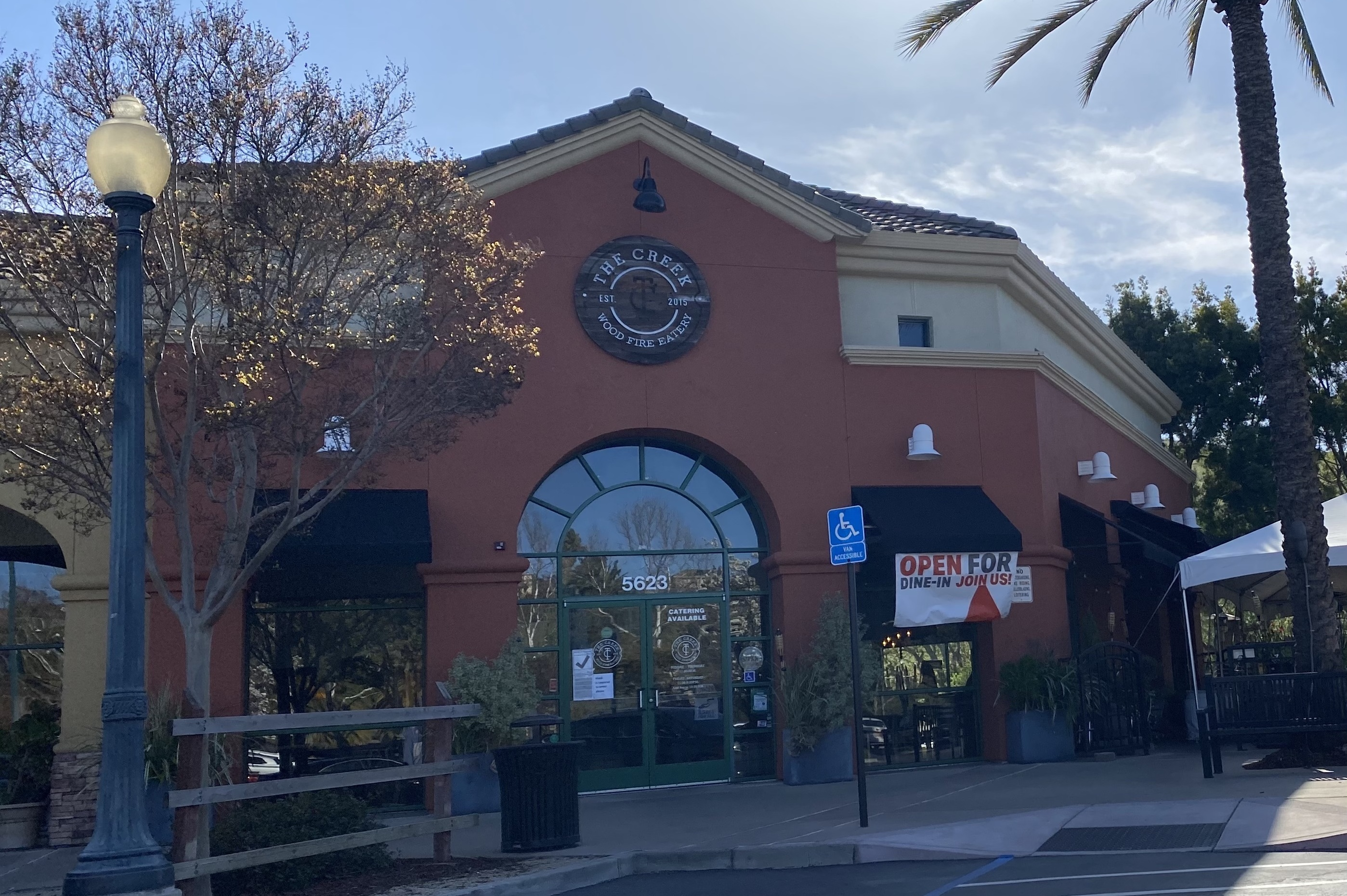
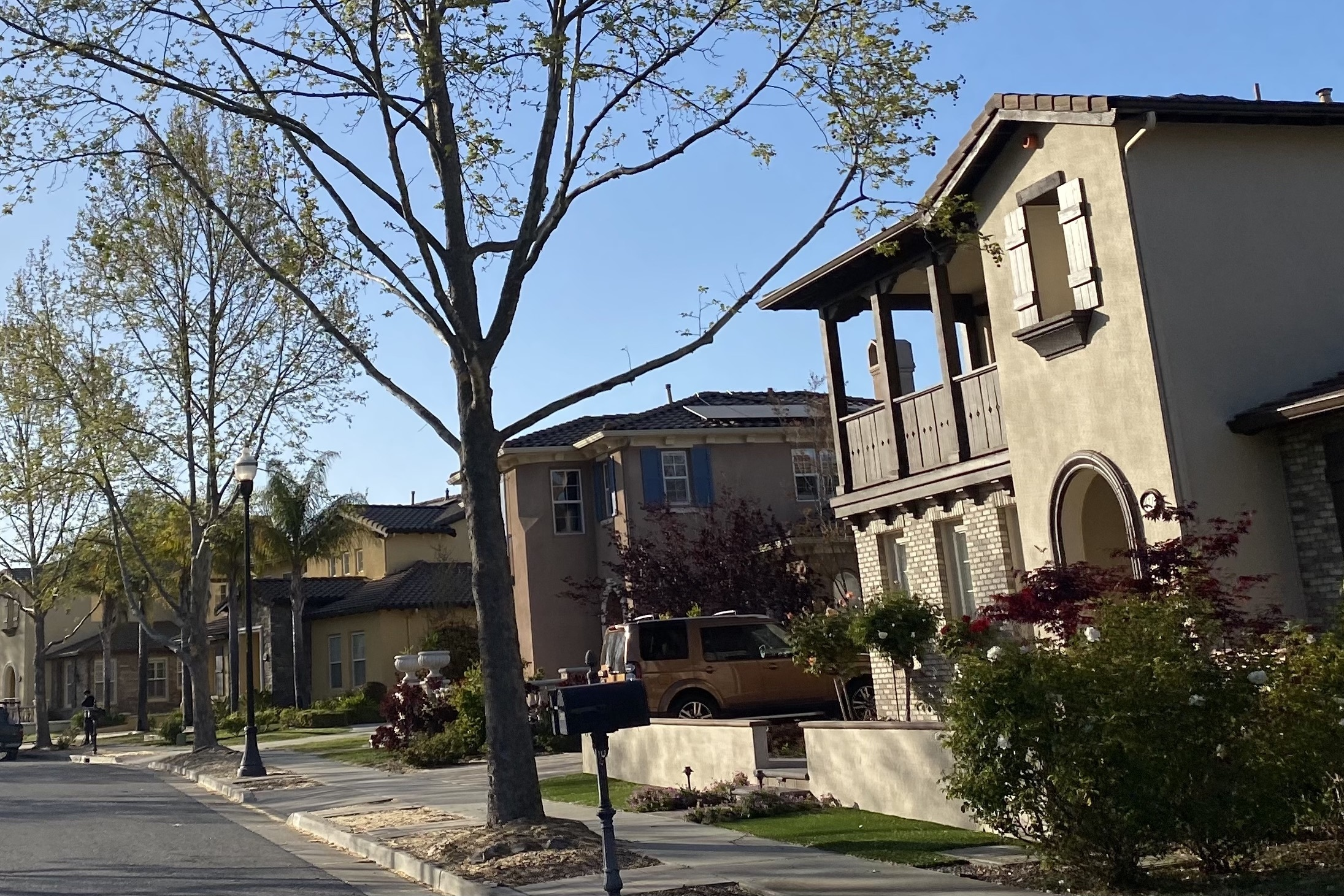
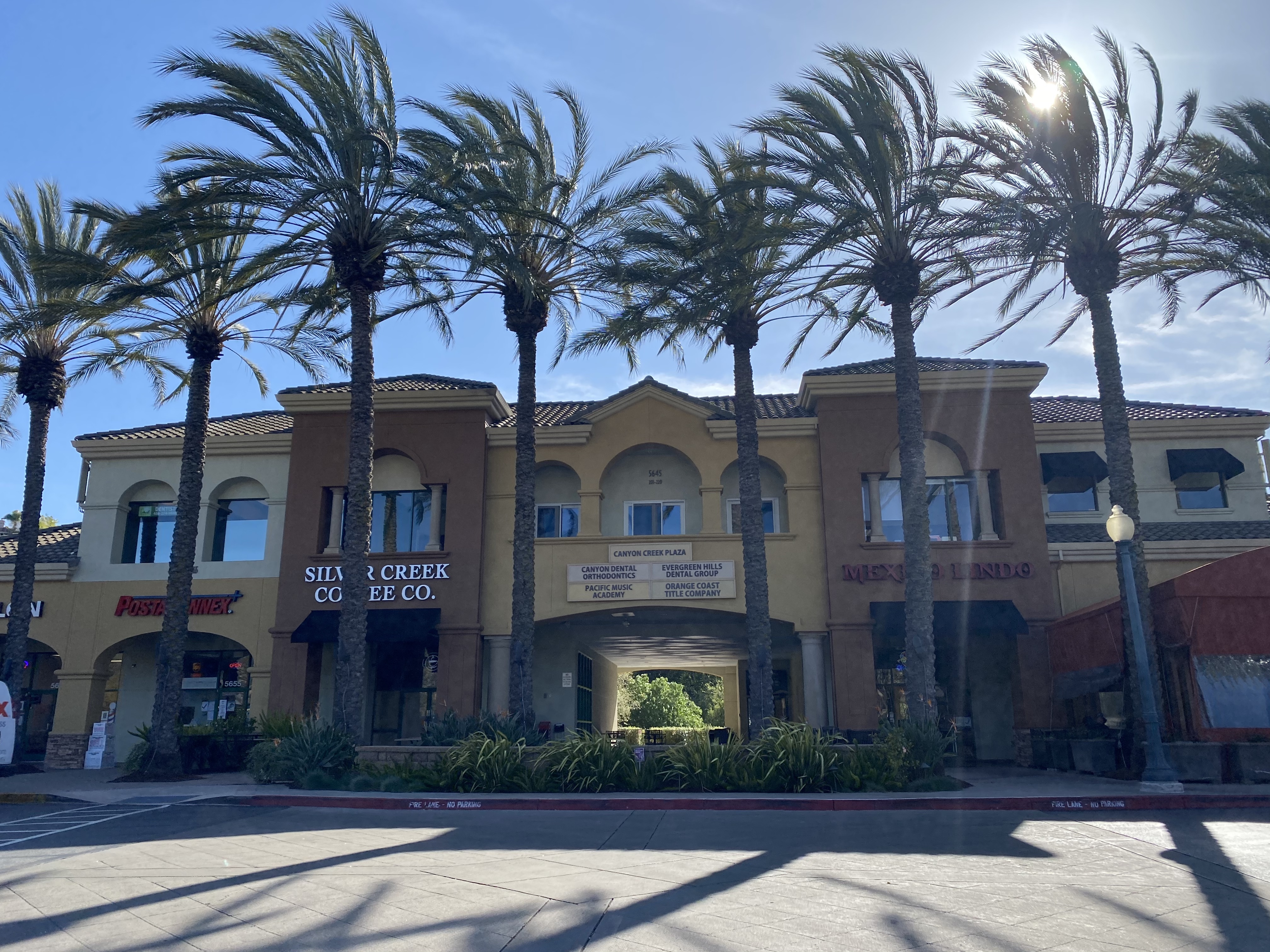
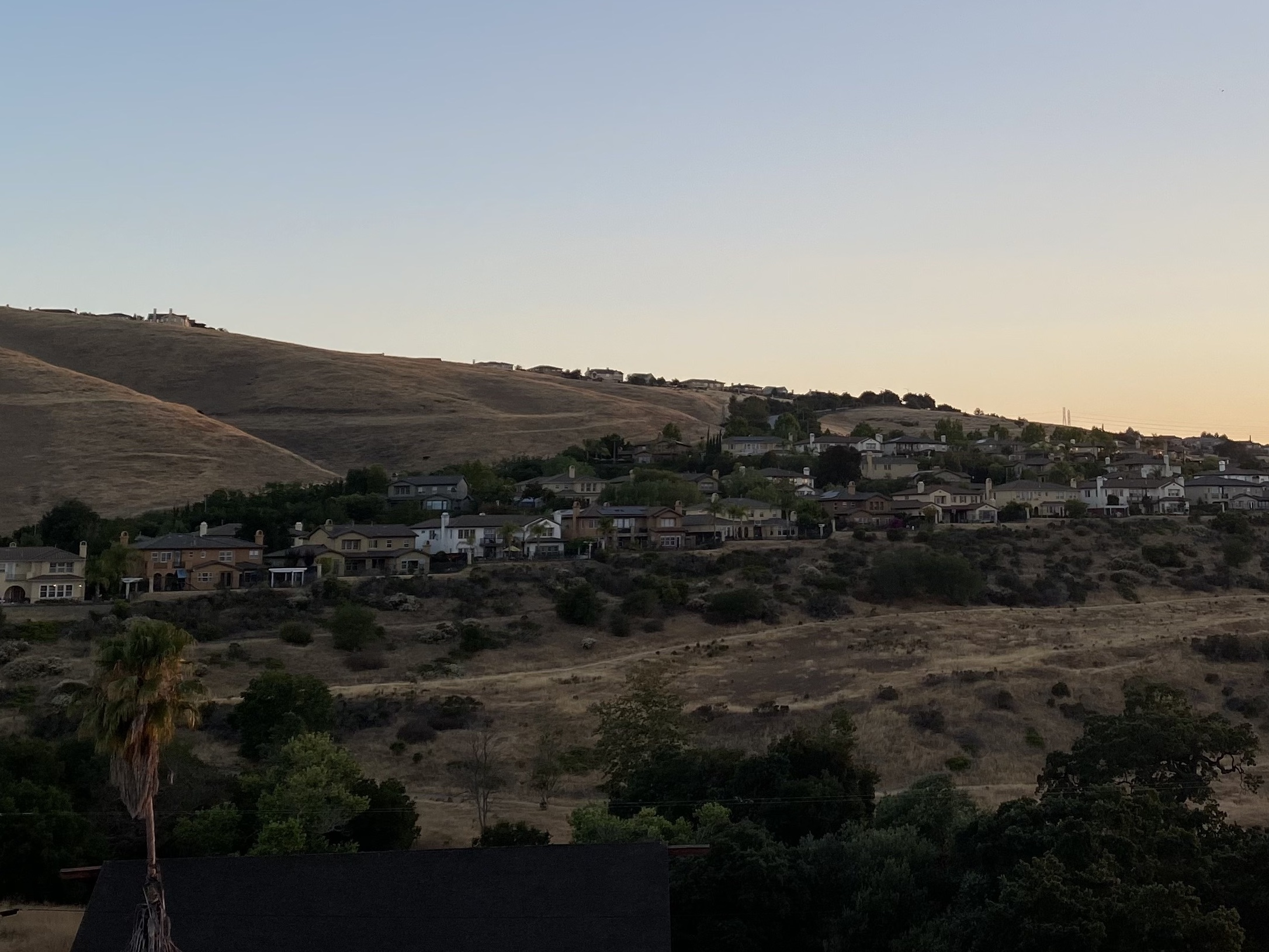

- Location within San Jose
- Coordinates: 37.28965°N 121.78223°W
- Country: United States
- State: California
- County: Santa Clara
- City: San Jose
- Zip Codes: 95138

Silver Creek Valley is a valley and neighborhood of the Evergreen district of San Jose, California. Silver Creek Valley is largely an affluent bedroom community.

== Geography ==
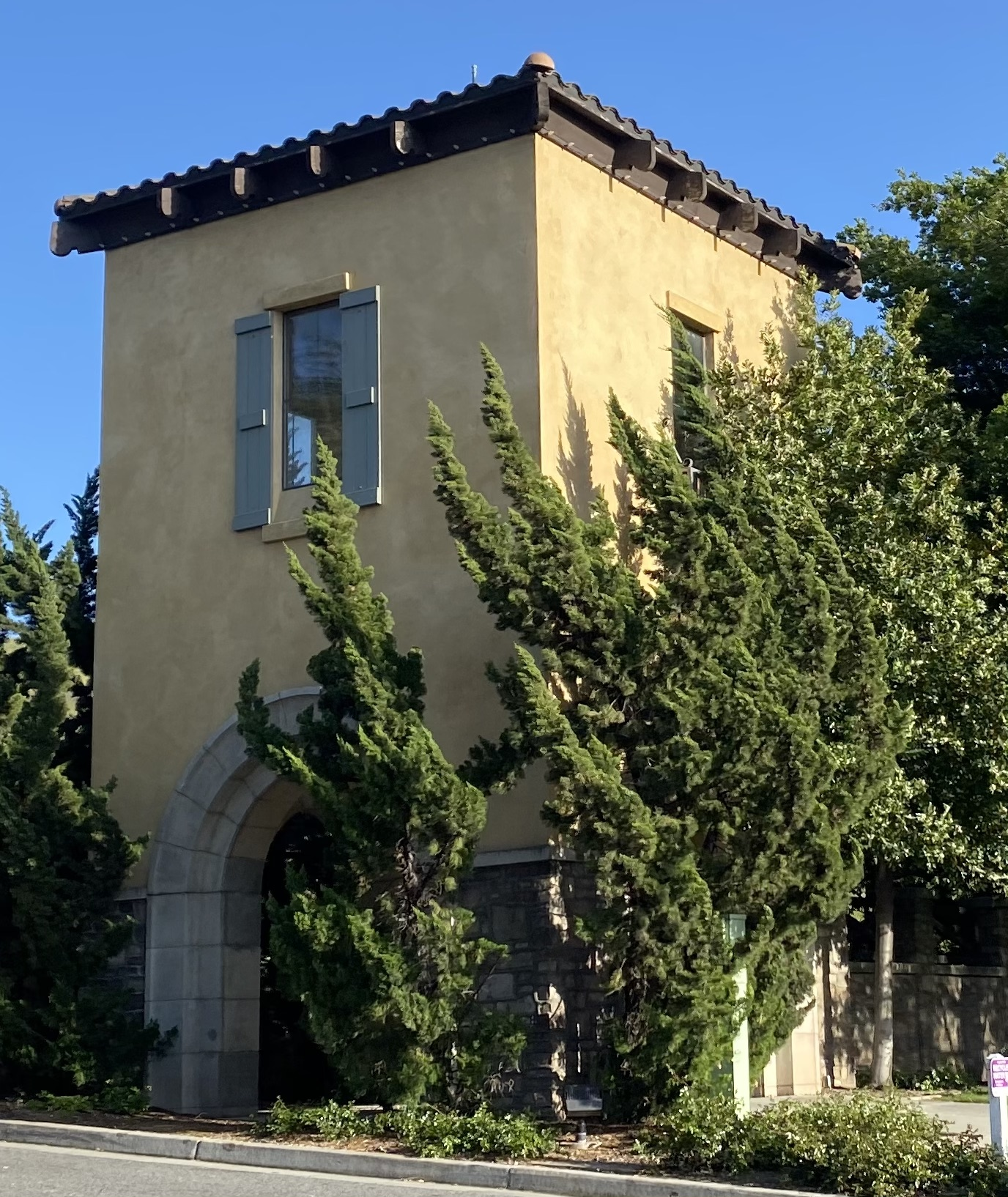
Gatehouse in the Silver Creek Hills.

The neighborhood is bordered on the east by the Diablo Range foothills. It is separated from the Edenvale and Santa Teresa by the Silver Creek Hills.

The Silver Creek Open Space Preserve makes up a large portion of the Silver Creek Hills.

== Education ==
Silver Creek is served by Silver Creek High School, James Franklin Smith Elementary School, and Silver Oak Elementary School.

== Notable residents ==
- Ray McDonald, NFL athlete for the San Francisco 49ers
- Robbie Martin, NFL athlete for the Detroit Lions and Indianapolis Colts
- Trent Baalke, NFL executive for the Jacksonville Jaguars and San Francisco 49ers
- Vernon Davis, NFL athlete for the San Francisco 49ers
