= Evergreen Village Square =

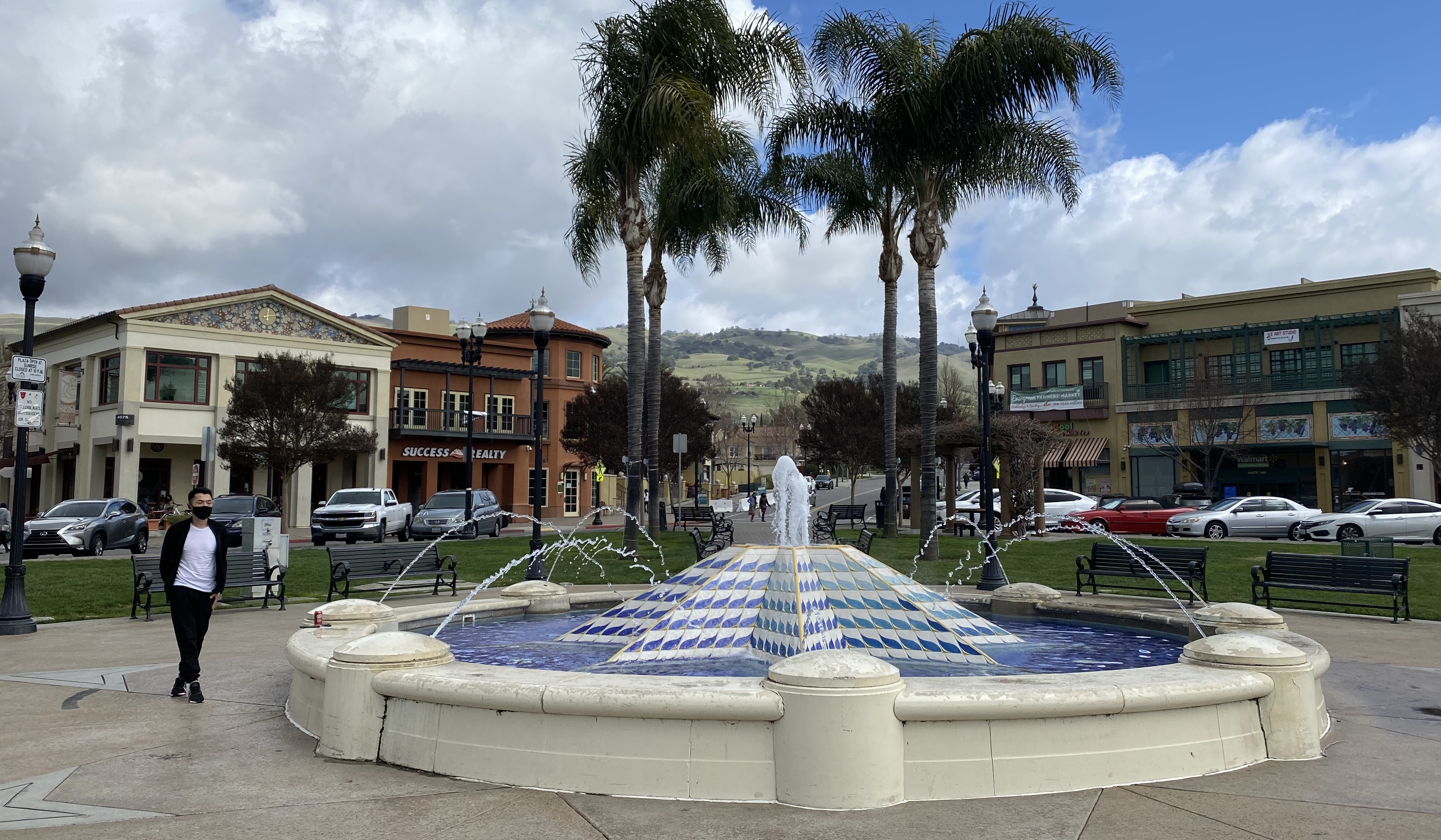

- Location: San Jose, California
- Coordinates: 37.313557°N 121.773772°W

Evergreen Village Square is a town square in the Evergreen district of San Jose, California. The square is a prominent shopping and dining destination in East San Jose. Evergreen Village Square serves as an important venue for public events in Evergreen and also hosts a branch of the San José Public Library.
