= Evergreen Elementary School District =

School district in California, United States

Address
- 3190 Quimby Road San Jose, California, 95148; United States

District information
- Type: Public
- Grades: K–8
- NCES District ID: 0613140

Students and staff
- Students: 8,800 (2025–2026)
- Teachers: 376.33 (FTE)
- Staff: 327.48 (FTE)
- Student–teacher ratio: 23.33:1

Other information
- Website: www.eesd.org

The Evergreen School District is a school district based in the Evergreen district of San Jose, California. It operates thirteen elementary schools (K-6) and three middle schools (7-8). The district has 376 teachers (FTEs) serving 8779 students.

== Schools ==
School	Students	FTE teachers	Pupil/teacher ratio
Cadwallader Elementary School	233	22.4	19.3
Carolyn Clark Elementary School	433	22.4	19.3
Cedar Grove Elementary School	793	34	23.3
Chaboya Middle School	1065	40.7	23.3
Evergreen Elementary School	582	26	22.4
Holly Oak Elementary School	772	34	22.7
George V. Leyva Middle School	939	40.1	23.4
Tom Matsumoto Elementary School	883	38	23.2
Millbrook Elementary School	732	31.6	23.2
John J. Montgomery Elementary School	784	34	23.1
Norwood Creek Elementary School	761	33	23.1
Quimby Oak Middle School	1055	43.7	24.1
Silver Oak Elementary School	765	34.1	22.4
James Franklin Smith Elementary School	436	20	21.8
Katherine R. Smith Elementary School	753	36	20.9
O.B. Whaley Elementary School	783	38	20.6

Notes: Partially based on 2002–2003 school year data
