= Evergreen, San Jose =

Evergreen Evergreen Valley
- Neighborhood of San Jose
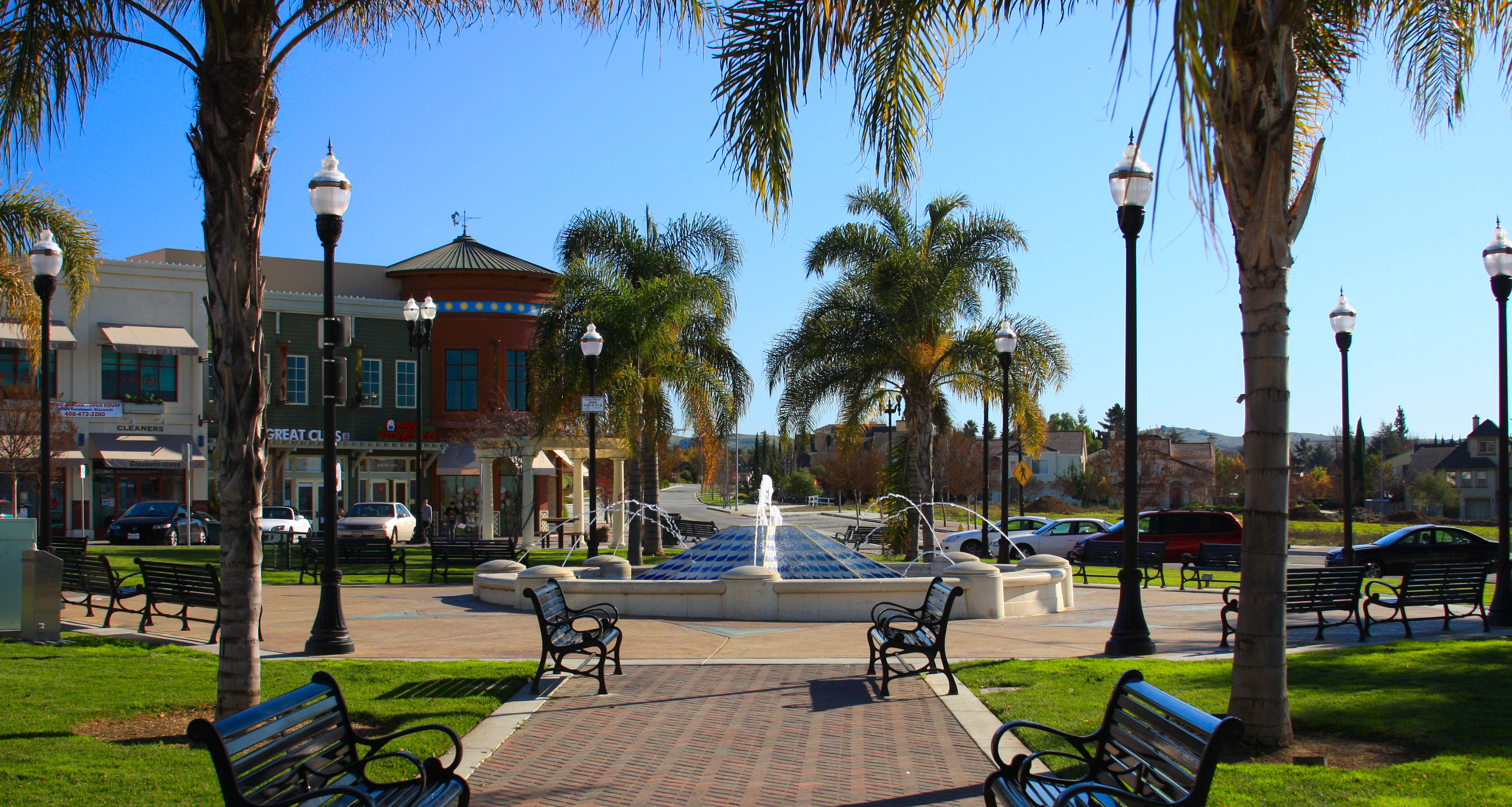
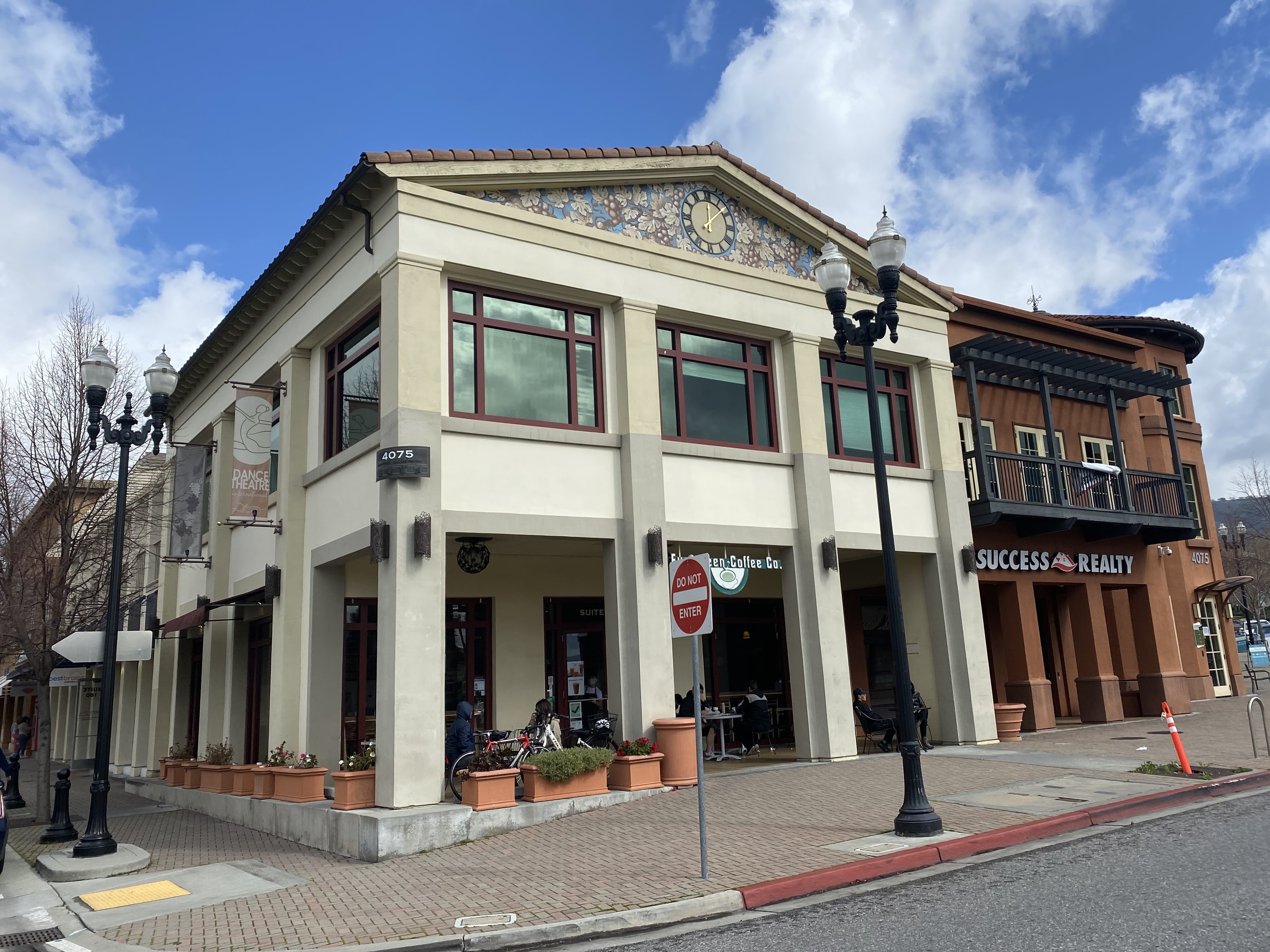
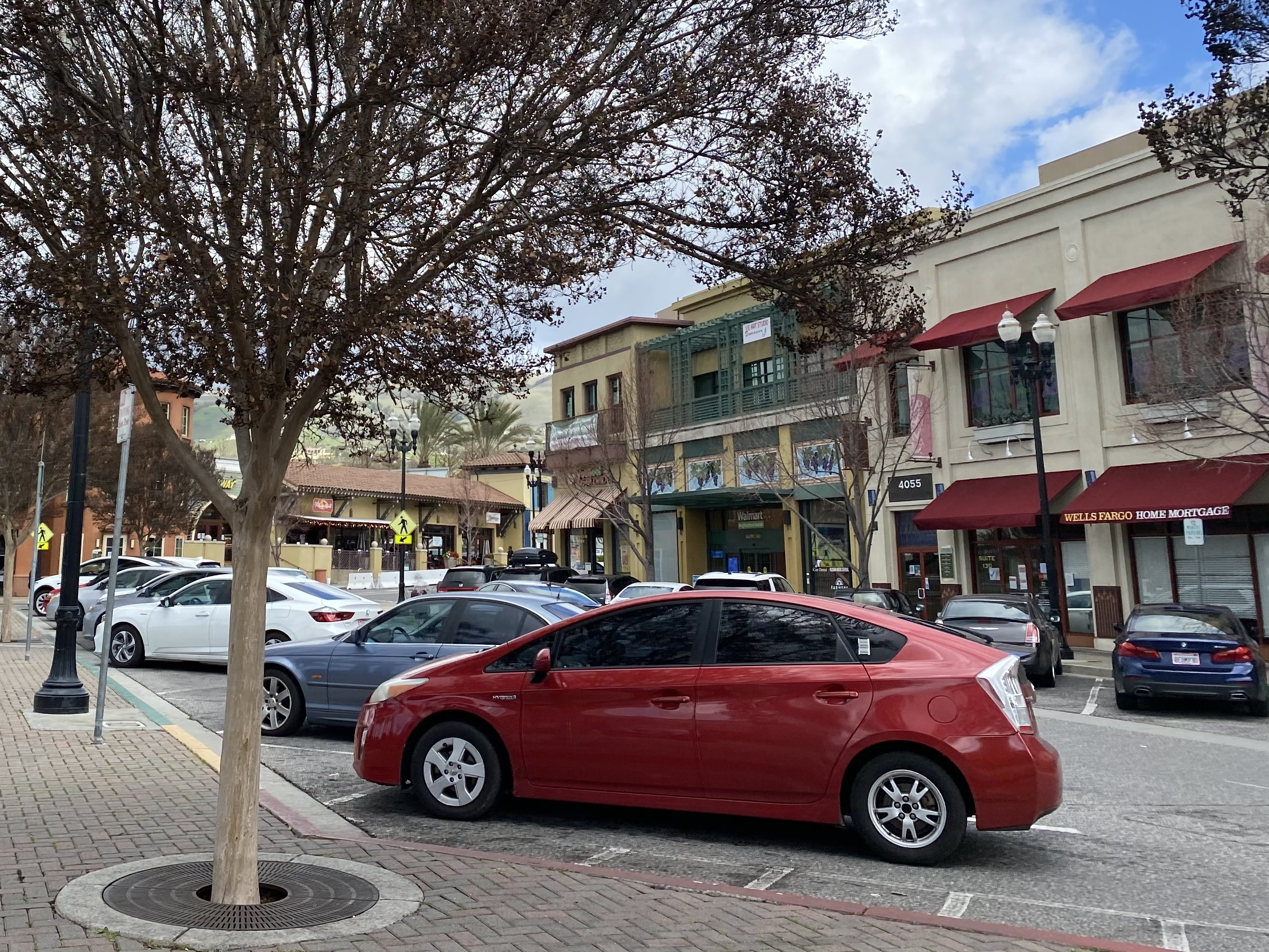
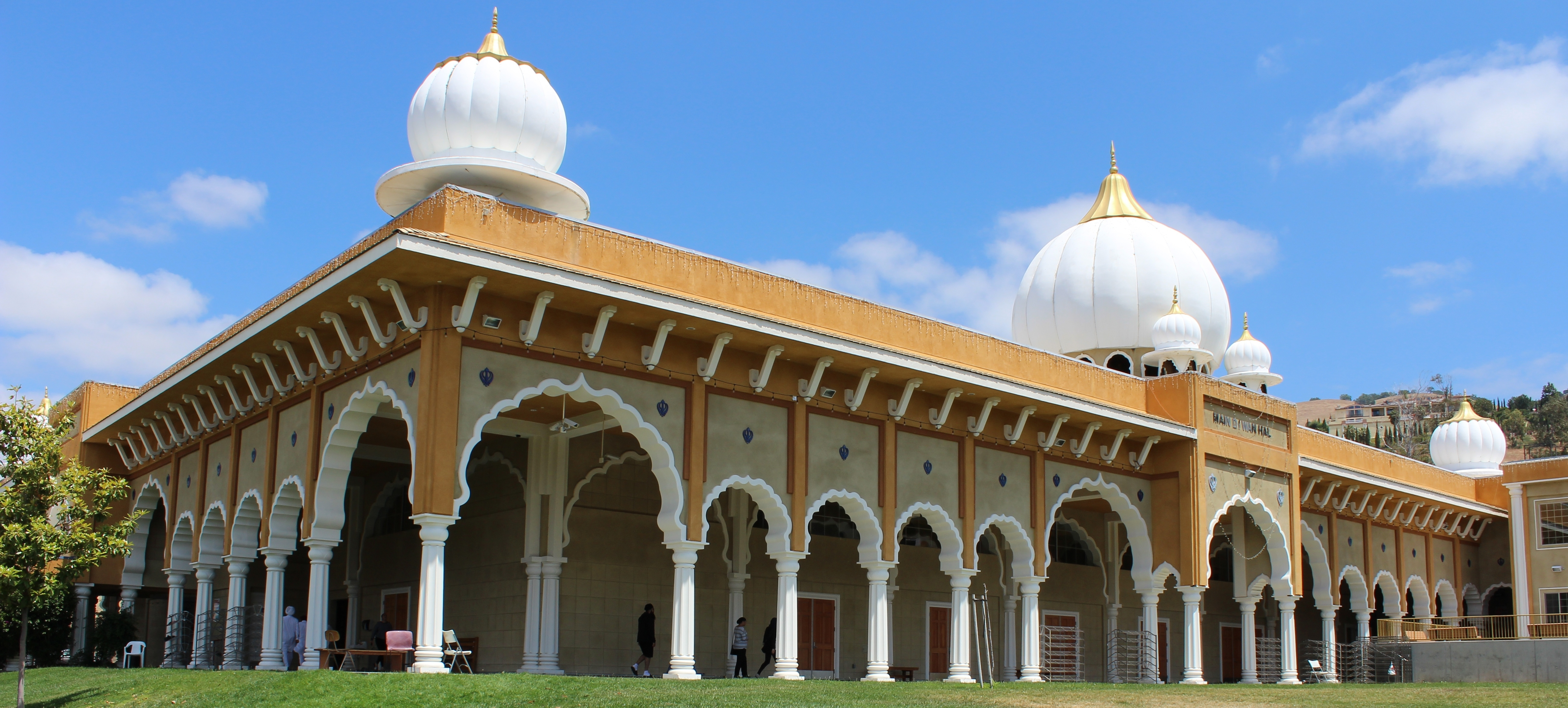
- Top images: Evergreen Village Square; bottom image: Gurdwara Sahib of San Jose.

- Location within San Jose
- Coordinates: 37.3096638°N 121.7835622°W
- Country: United States
- State: California
- County: Santa Clara
- City: San Jose
- Zip Codes: 95148, 95121, 95138, 95135,95111

Evergreen, also known as Evergreen Valley, is a large district of San Jose, California, located in East San Jose.

== History ==
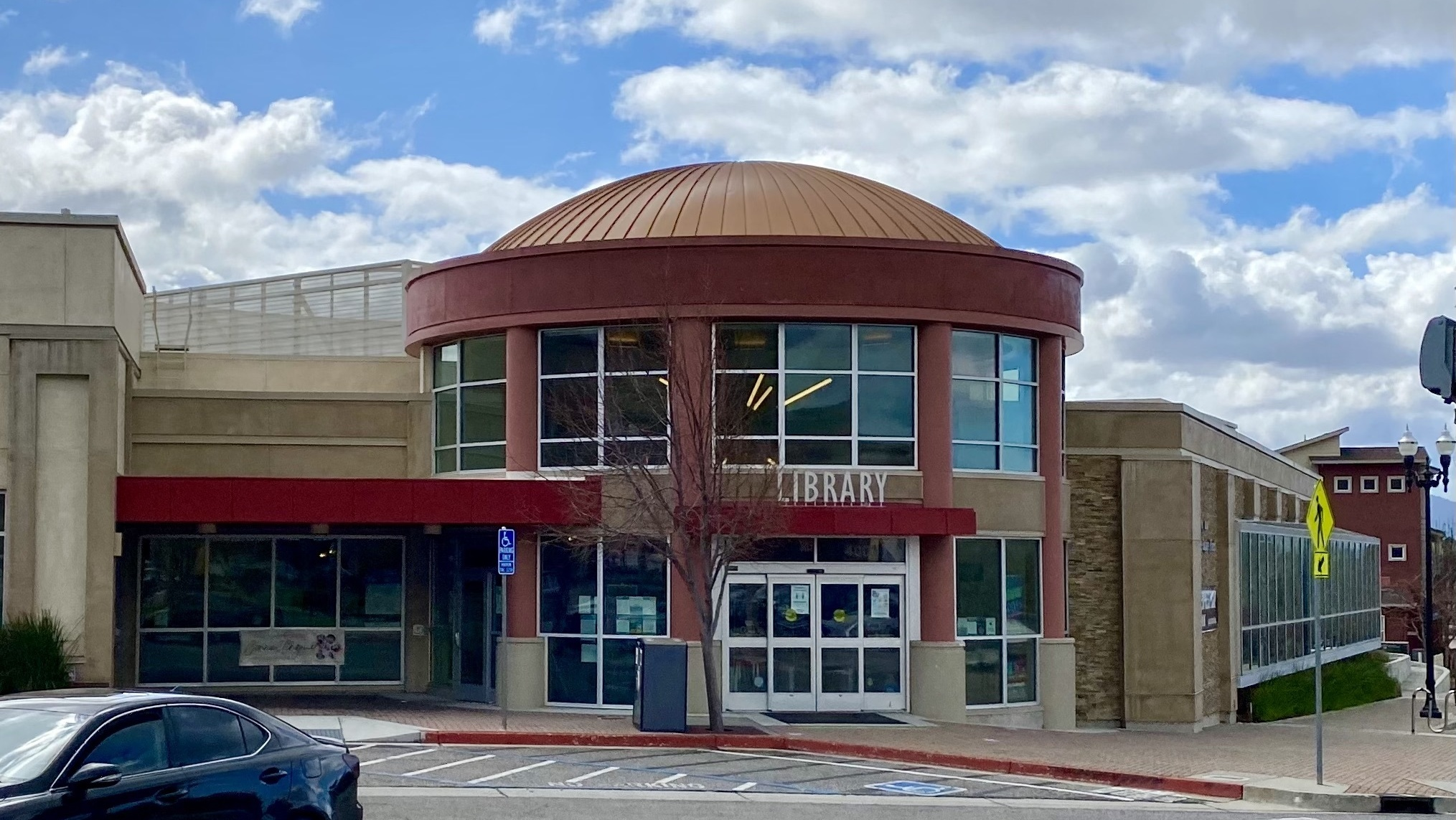
Evergreen Village Square branch of the San José Public Library.

Evergreen was originally part of Rancho Yerba Buena, a Mexican-era rancho grant given to Antonio Chaboya, a member of a prominent, local Californio family, by Governor José Figueroa. The Chaboya family played an important role in the development of the area and is memorialized in Evergreen through various place names, such as Chaboya Middle School, Chaboya Park, Chaboya Road, and the Chaboya neighborhood of Evergreen.

Evergreen was the site of gliding experiments in 1911 by John J. Montgomery, an important figure in pioneering aeronautics. In his honor the local community has established John J. Montgomery Elementary School, Montgomery Park (City of San Jose).

Montgomery's last glider, named "The Evergreen", after the San Jose district, was restored by the Smithsonian Institution and is currently on display at the San Diego Air and Space Museum in San Diego, California.

== Geography ==
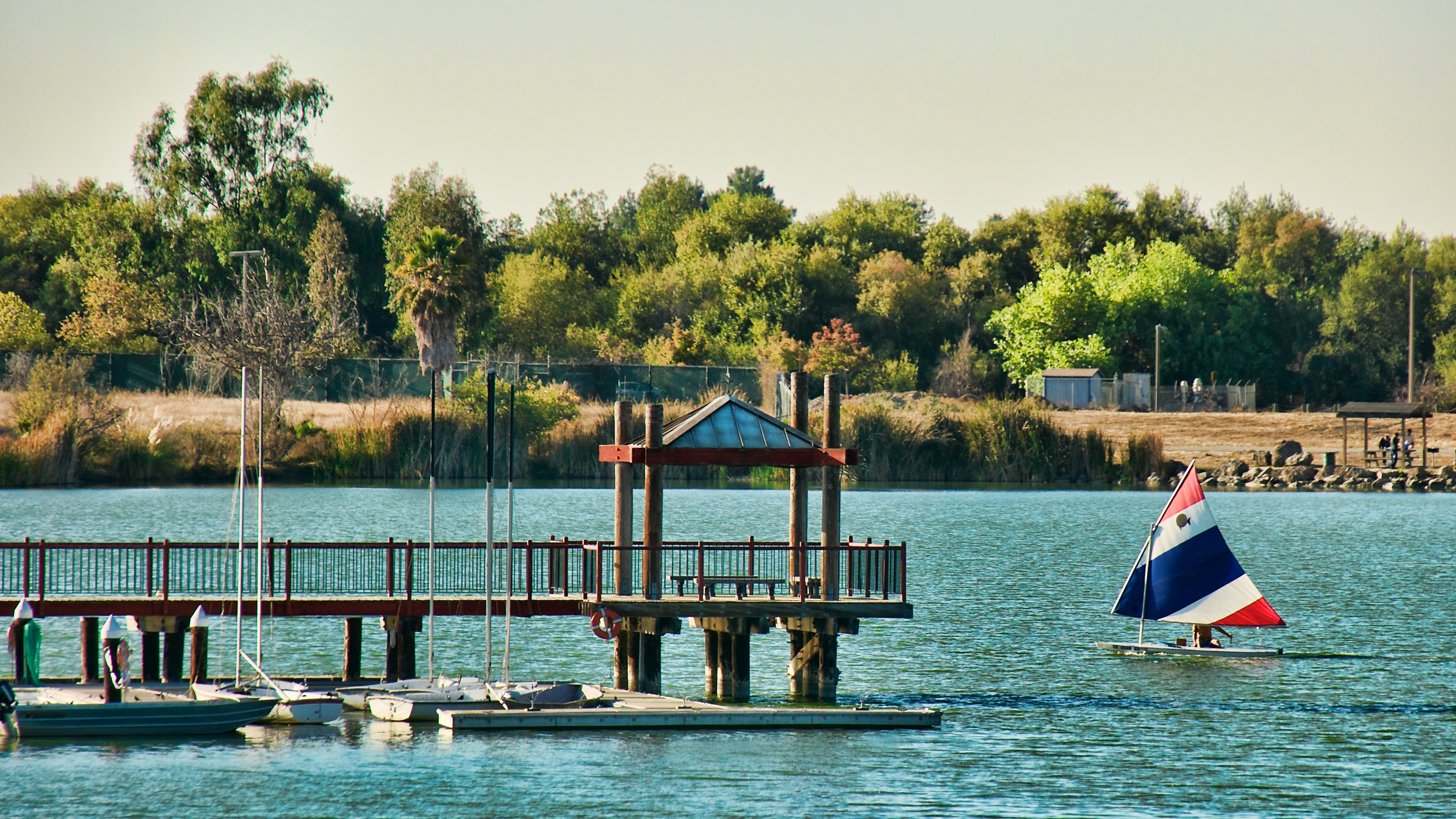
Lake Cunningham.

Evergreen is located in East San Jose. The Alum Rock district is located north of Evergreen and Silver Creek Valley (sometimes considered part of Evergreen) is located south of Evergreen. To the east of Evergreen is the Diablo Range.

Waterways in Evergreen include Thompson Creek, Upper Silver Creek and Lower Silver Creek.

== Education ==
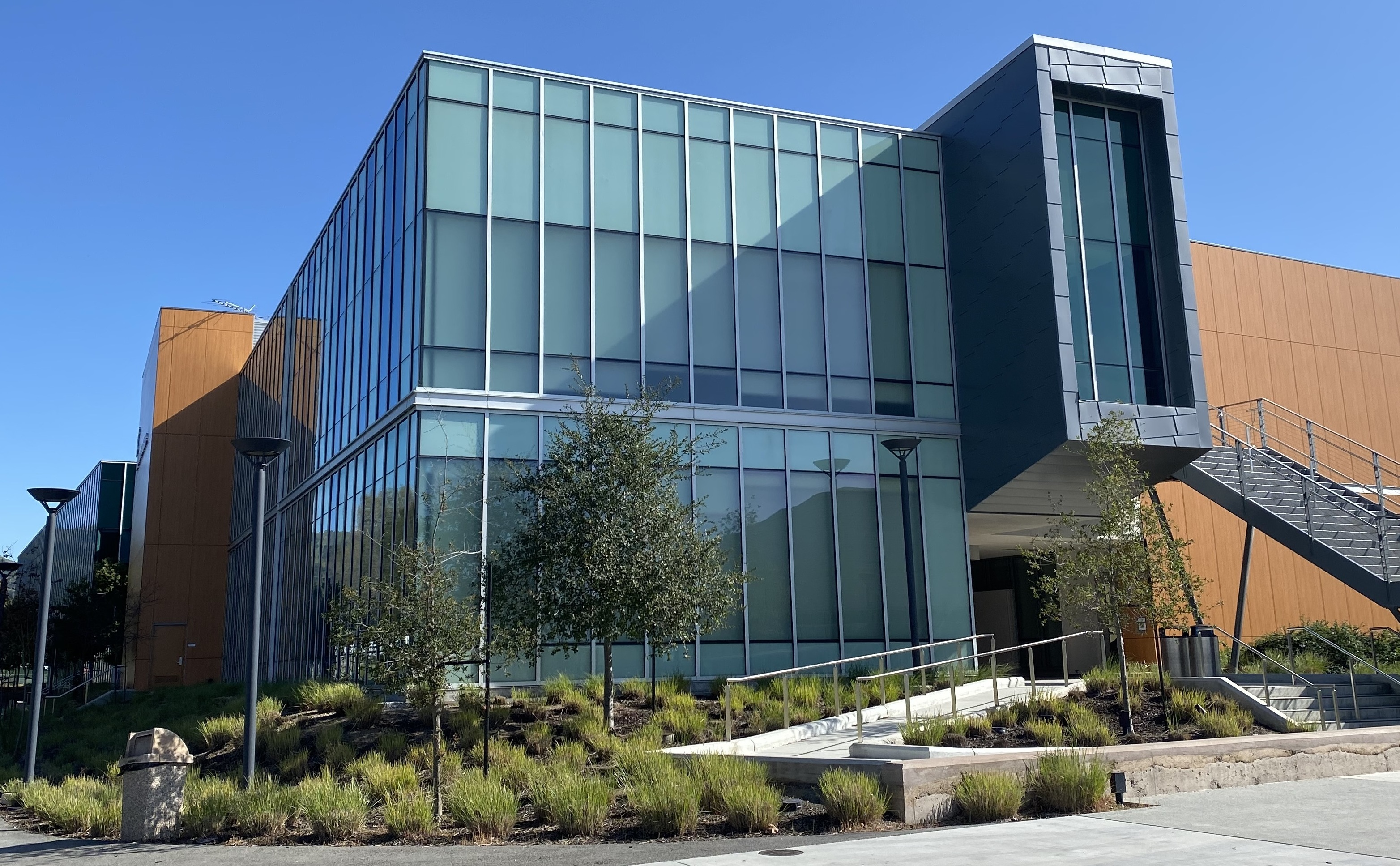
Math, Science, & Social Studies Building of Evergreen Valley College.

The area is served by Evergreen Elementary School District and East Side Union High School District. Evergreen Valley High School with an API score of 10 in 2016 and Silver Creek High School with an API score of 9 in 2016 are the primary comprehensive high schools to serve Evergreen.

Evergreen Valley College is at the base of the foothills of the Diablo Range.

Libraries

Evergreen area is served by two libraries as part of San Jose Public Library System:

- Evergreen Branch Library on Aborn Road
- Evergreen Village Square Branch Library at Evergreen Village Square

Evergreen Valley College also has its Library and Educational Technology Center.

== Landmarks ==
- Evergreen Village Square
- Lake Cunningham
- Raging Waters San Jose
- Eastridge
- Evergreen Valley College
- Gurdwara Sahib of San Jose
- Montgomery Hill (Evergreen Aviation Monument)

== Montgomery Hill landmark ==
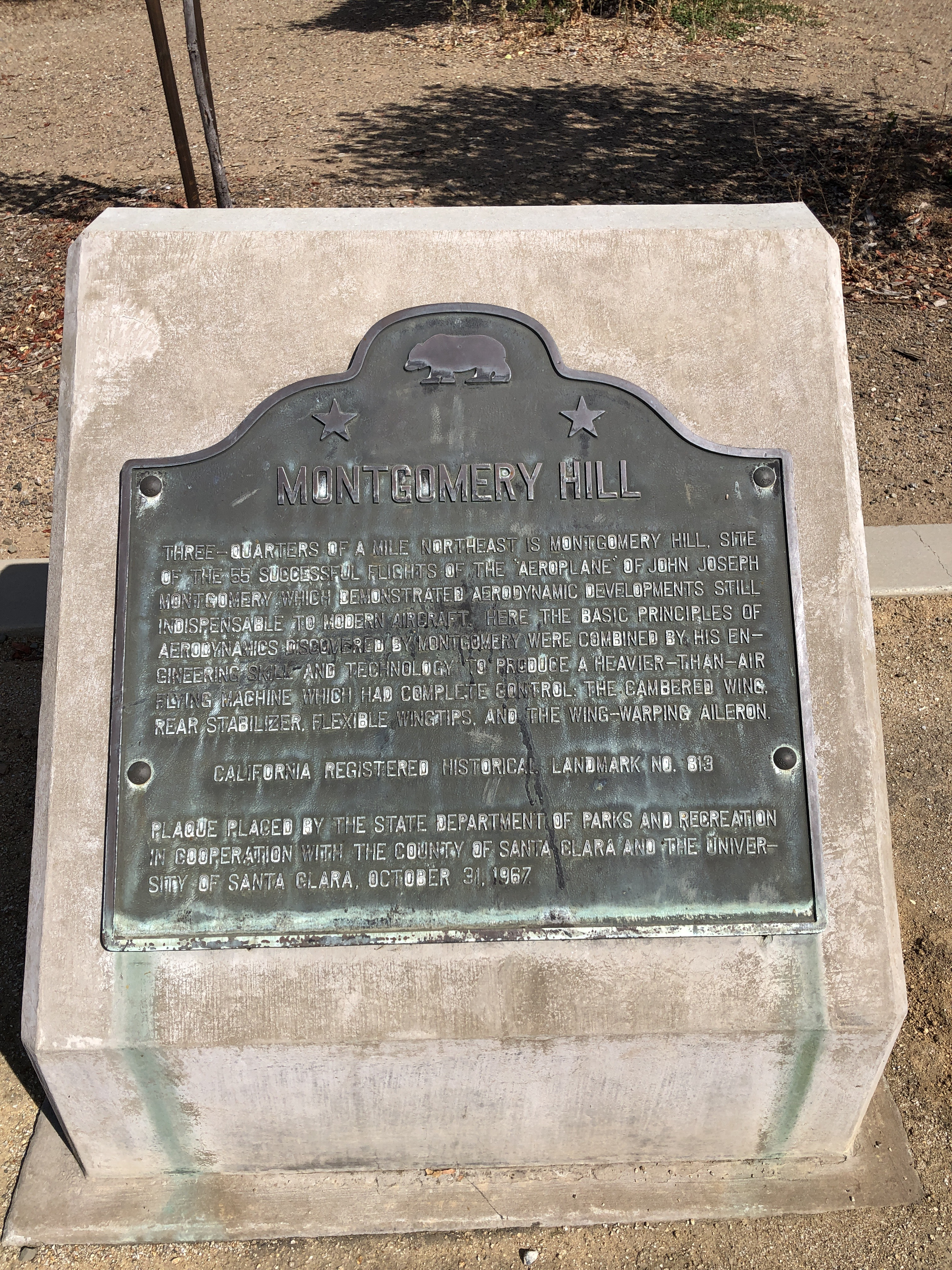
Montgomery Hill Monument

On September 12, 1966, the State Historic Preservation Office designated the Montgomery Hill as a California historical landmark #813. A description on the commemorative plaque reads: "Three-quarters of a mile northeast is Montgomery Hill, site of the 55 successful flights of John Joseph Montgomery's 'aeroplane' that demonstrated aerodynamic developments still indispensable to modern aircraft. Montgomery combined his engineering skill with the basic principles of aerodynamics that he discovered to produce a heavier-than-air flying machine which had complete control: cambered wing, rear stabilizer, flexible wingtips, and wing-warping aileron."

== Plazas and parks ==
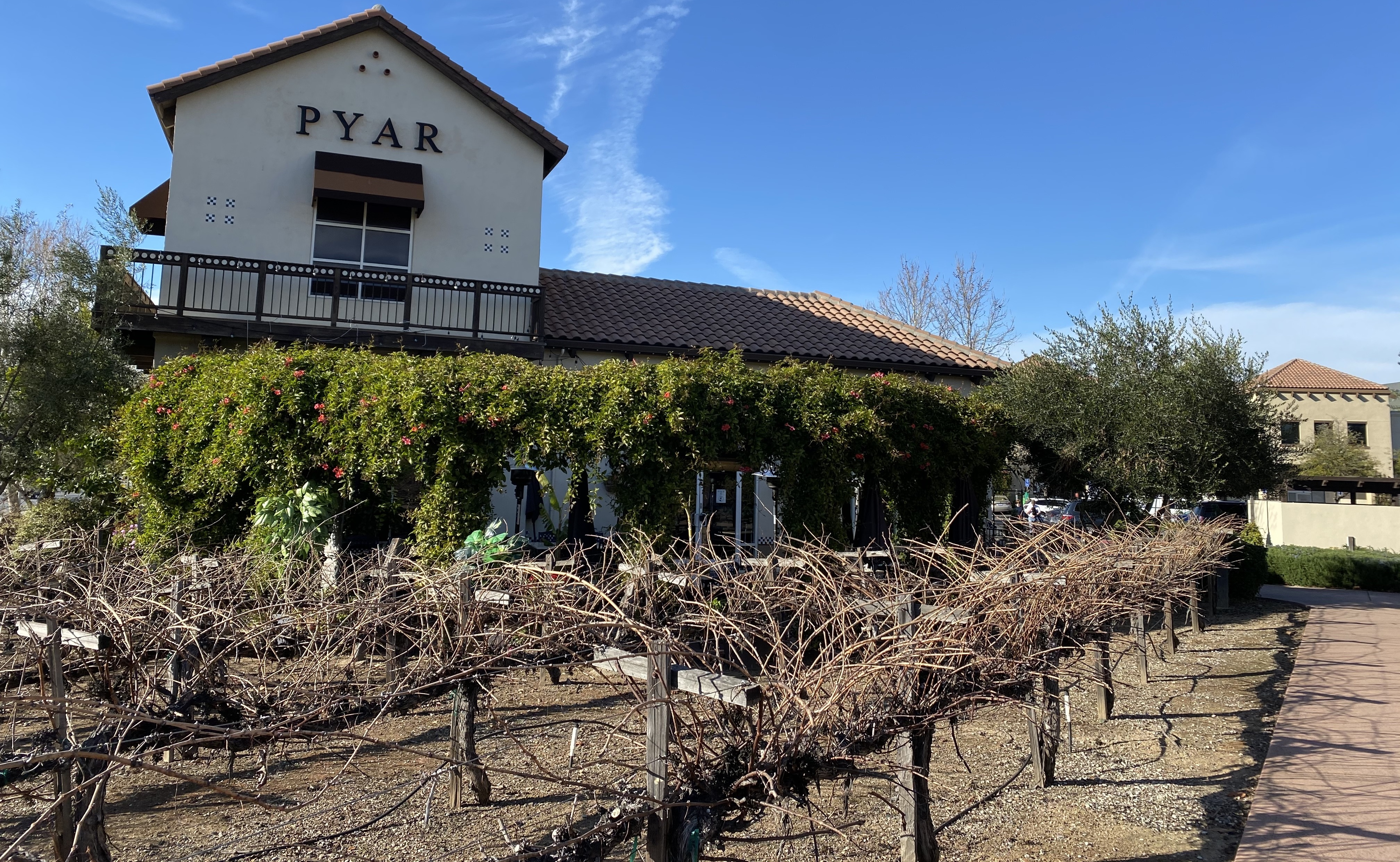
Vineyards at the corner of Yerba Buena and San Felipe.

- Evergreen Village Square
- Lake Cunningham
- Joseph D. Grant County Park
- Boggini Park
- Canyon Creek Park,
- Montgomery Hill Park,
- Groesbeck Hill Park,
- Fowler Creek Park
- Arcadia Ballpark
- Brigadoon Park

== Gallery ==
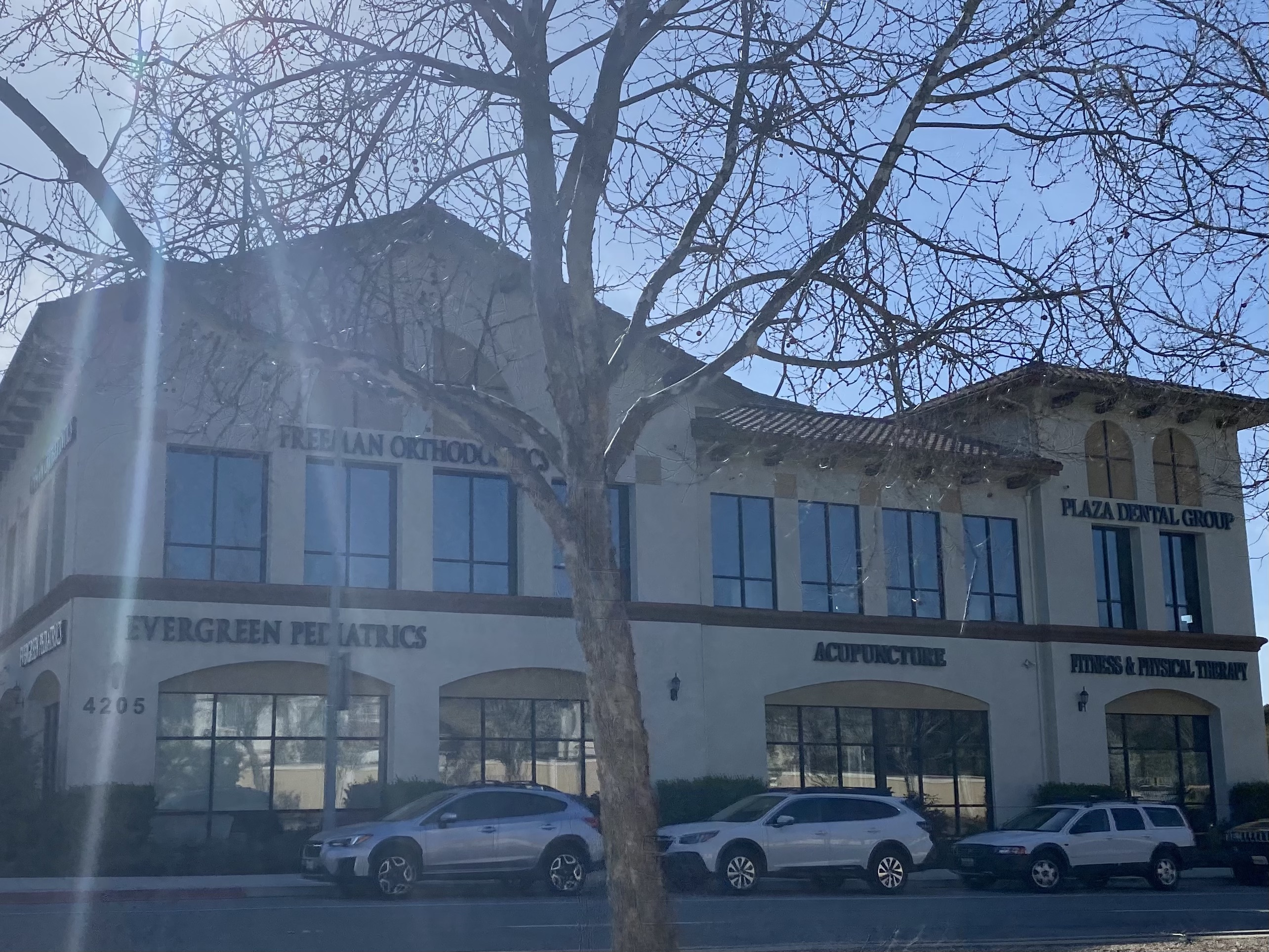
Businesses on San Felipe

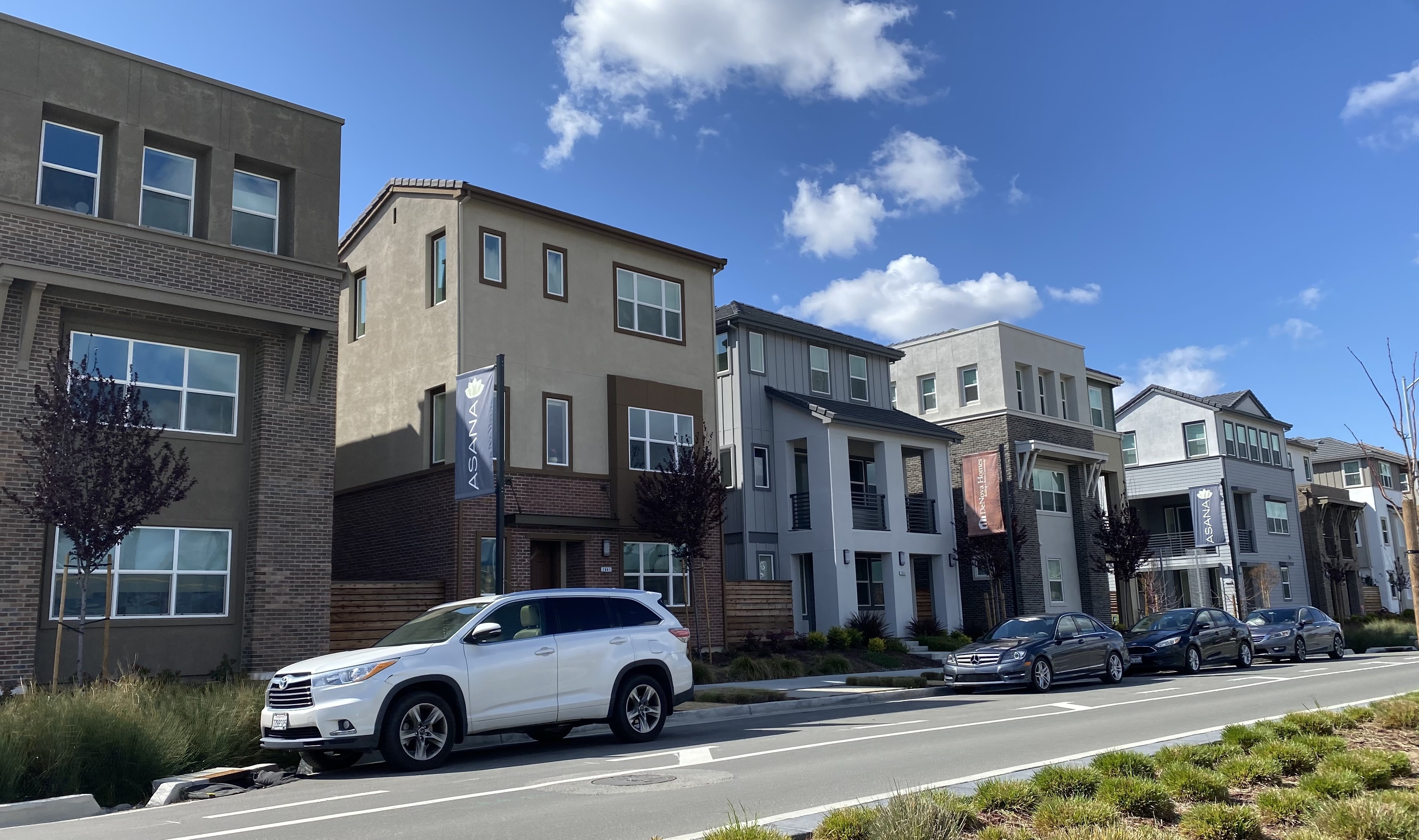
Townhomes on the Evergreen Loop

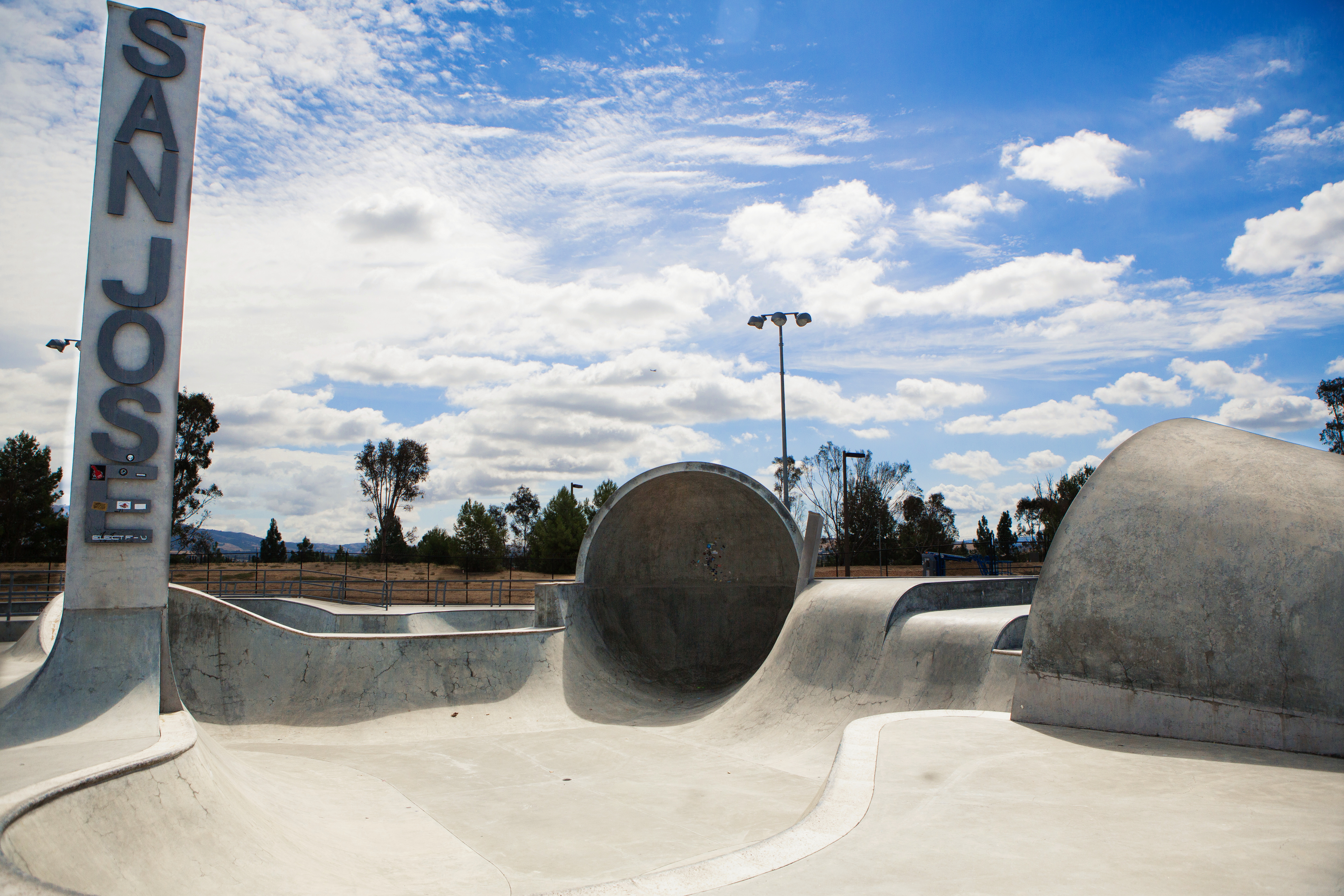
Lake Cunningham Skate Park

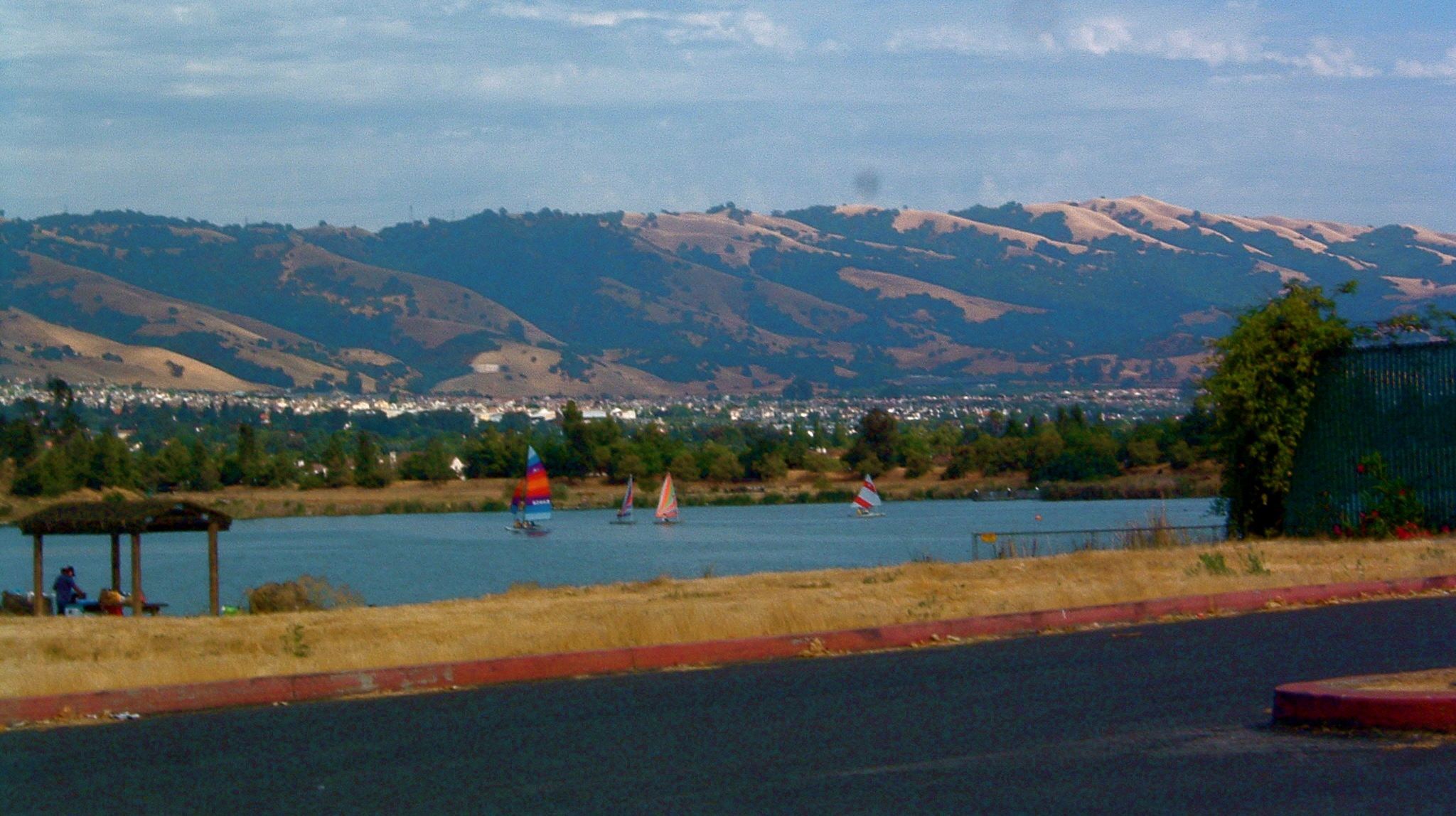
Lake Cunningham

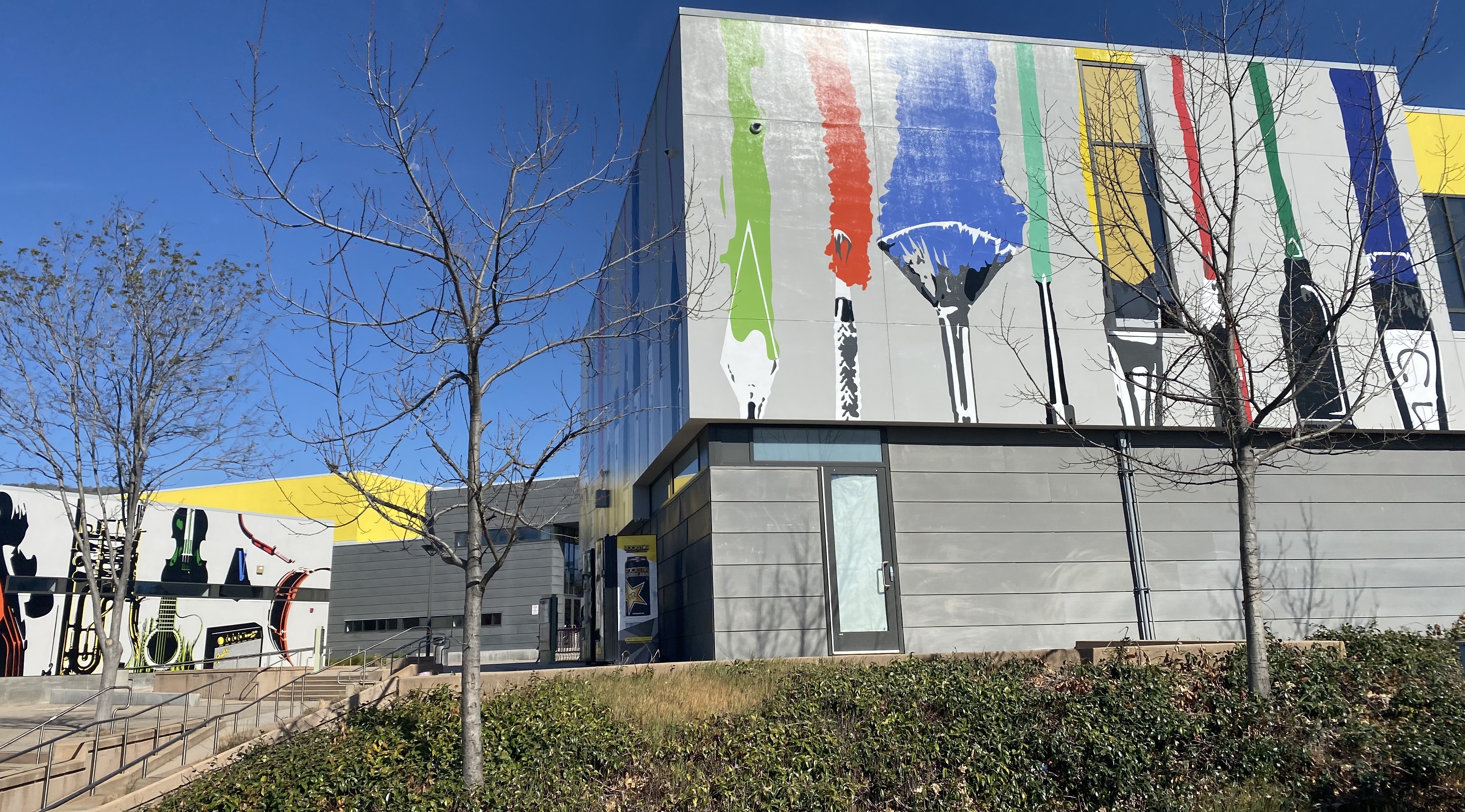
Evergreen Valley College Centers for Visual and Performing Arts

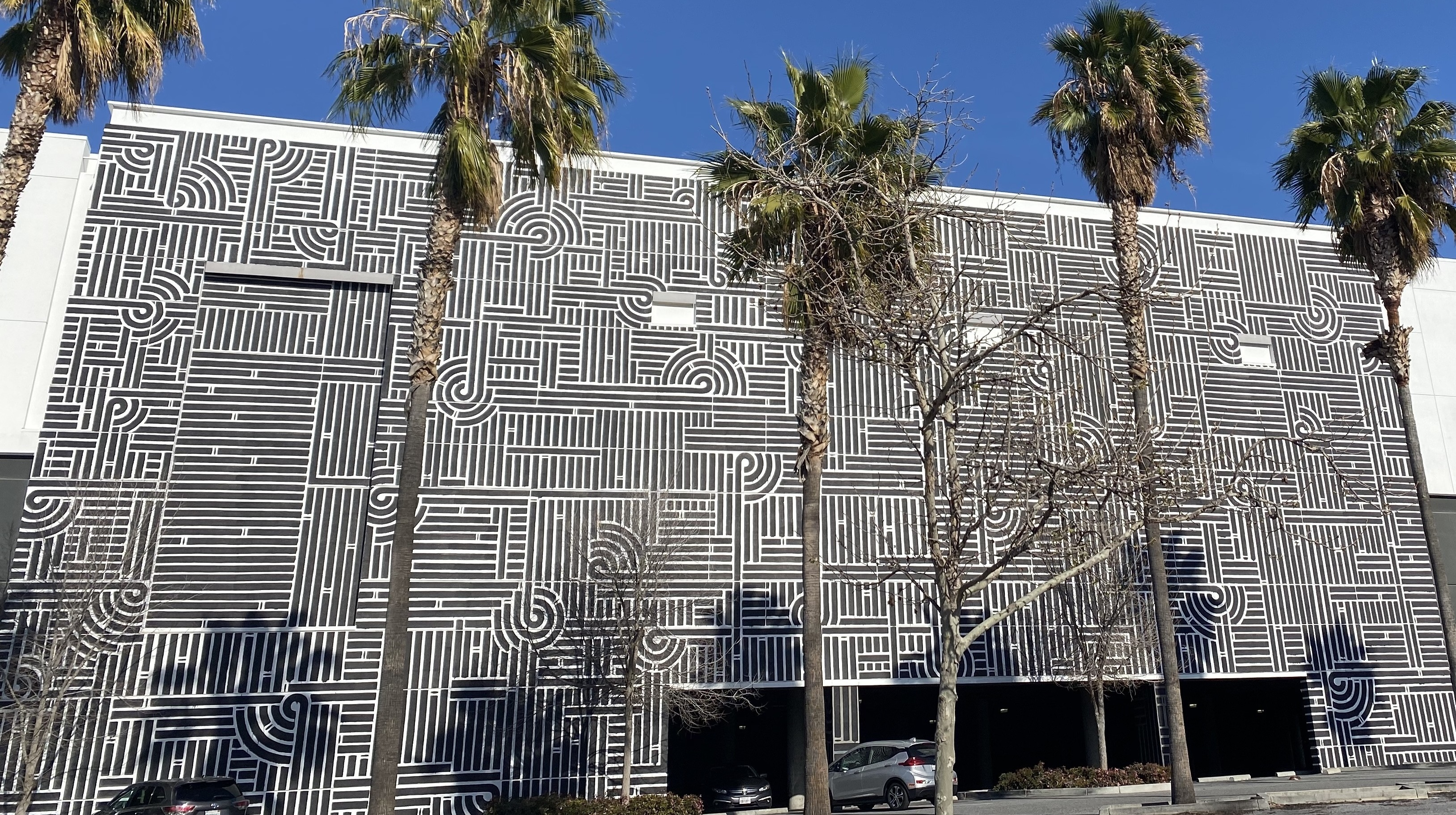
Eastridge

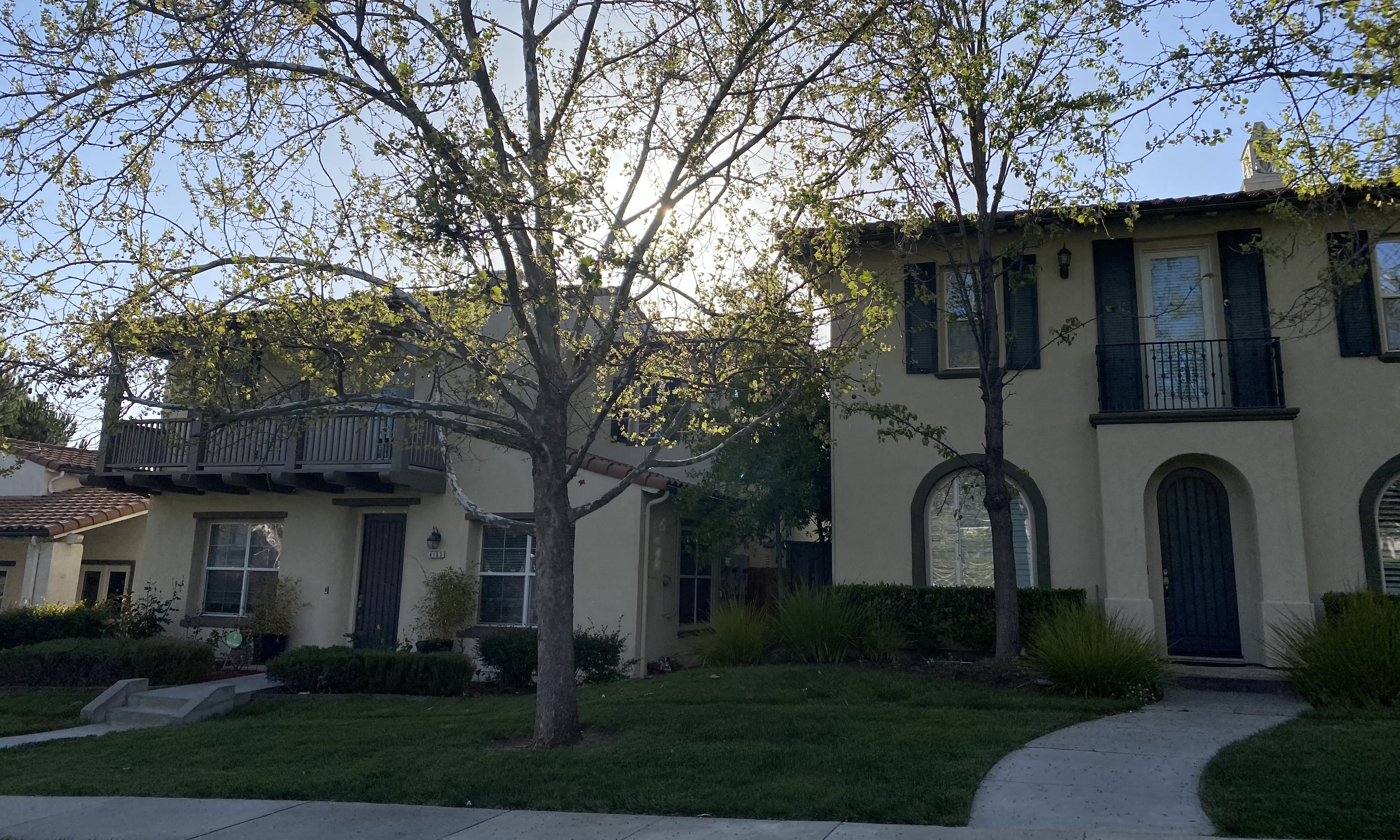
Traditional Californian Spanish style homes in Evergreen
