= Evergreen Valley College =

Community college in San Jose, California, US

Coordinates: 37°18′4″N 121°45′47″W

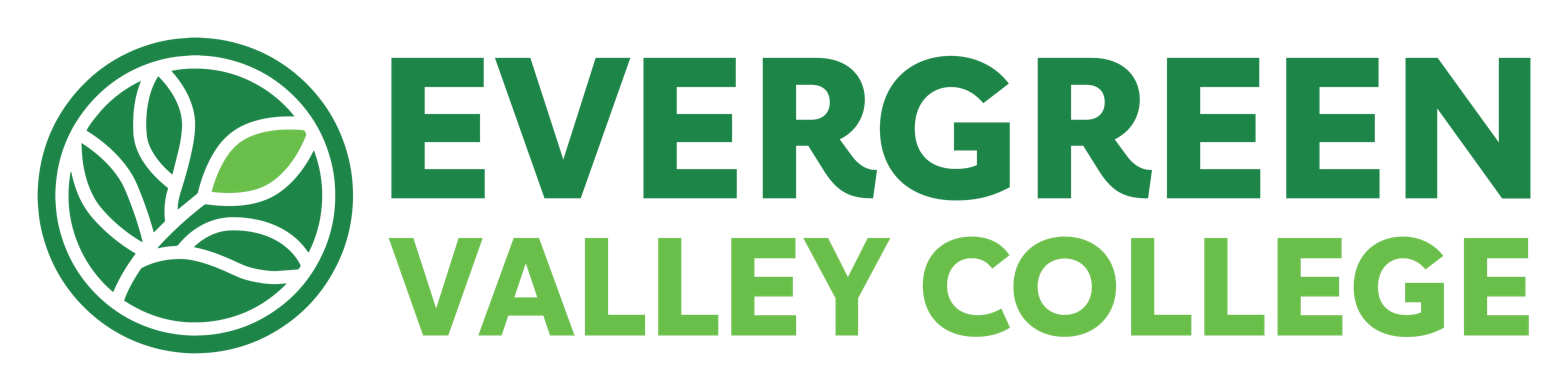
- Type: Public community college
- Established: 1975
- Affiliations: California Community; College System (San José-Evergreen; Community College District)
- Chancellor: Beatriz Chaidez (interim)
- President: Denise Noldon (interim)
- Students: 8,000+
- Location: Evergreen, San Jose, California, United States
- Campus: 175 acres (71 ha)
- Colours: Green
- Mascot: Evergreen Hawks
- Website: Official website

Evergreen Valley College (EVC) is a public community college in San Jose, California. Located in the Evergreen district of East San Jose, California, EVC was founded in 1975 and is part of the California Community College System.

== History ==
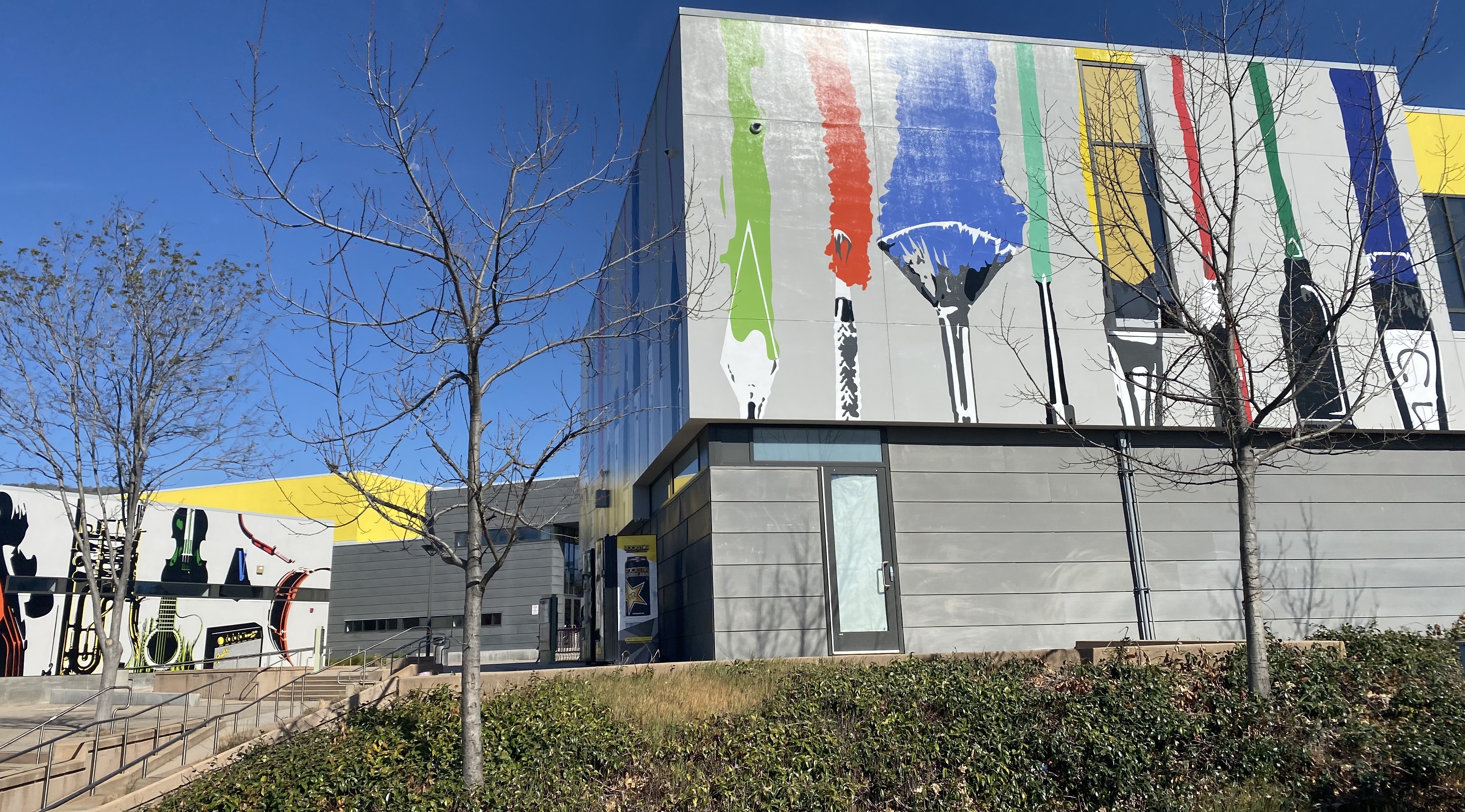
The Visual Arts Center in the foreground and the Center for Performing Arts in the background.

The San José-Evergreen Community College District was officially created on 1 July 1964, after which the district immediately began planning to build a community college.

The site in Evergreen, in East San Jose, was chosen in 1967. The college was officially named Evergreen Valley College in 1970 and opened to its first class in 1975. The college expanded to include the biological sciences, nursing education programs, a library, a student center, a center for the arts, and the Montgomery Hill Observatory.

== Academics ==
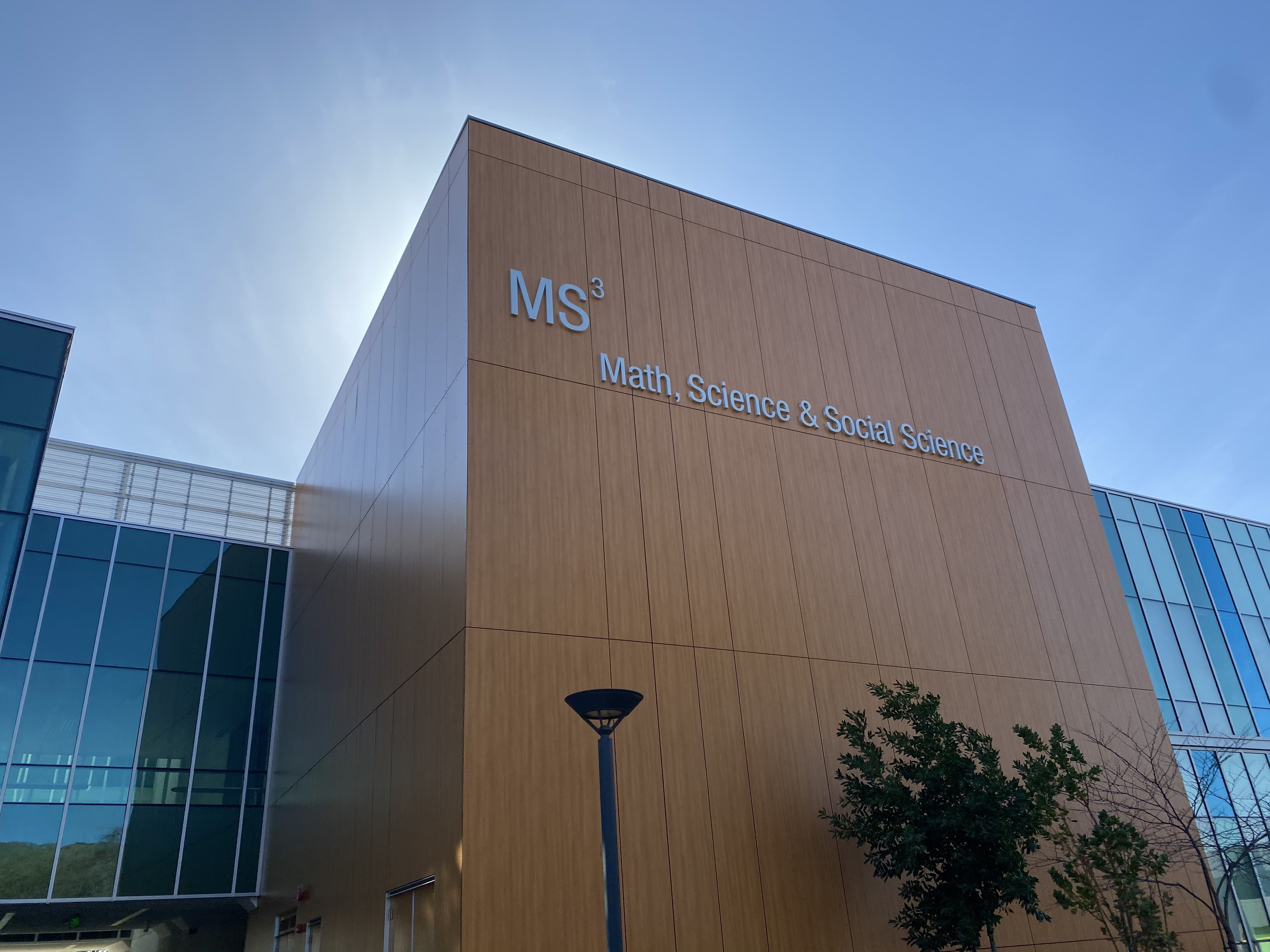
The Math, Science, & Social Studies Building.

=== Accreditation ===
Evergreen Valley College is institutionally accredited by the Accrediting Commission for Community and Junior Colleges. Approvals and certifications of specific programs include:

- The Certified Nursing Assistant Program is approved through California Department of Public Health Aide and Technician Certification Section
- The Registered Nursing (ADN) Program is approved by the California State Board of Registered Nursing and the Accreditation Commission for Education in Nursing
- The Honda program is a certified American Honda Training Program certified through NCTE

=== Academic divisions ===
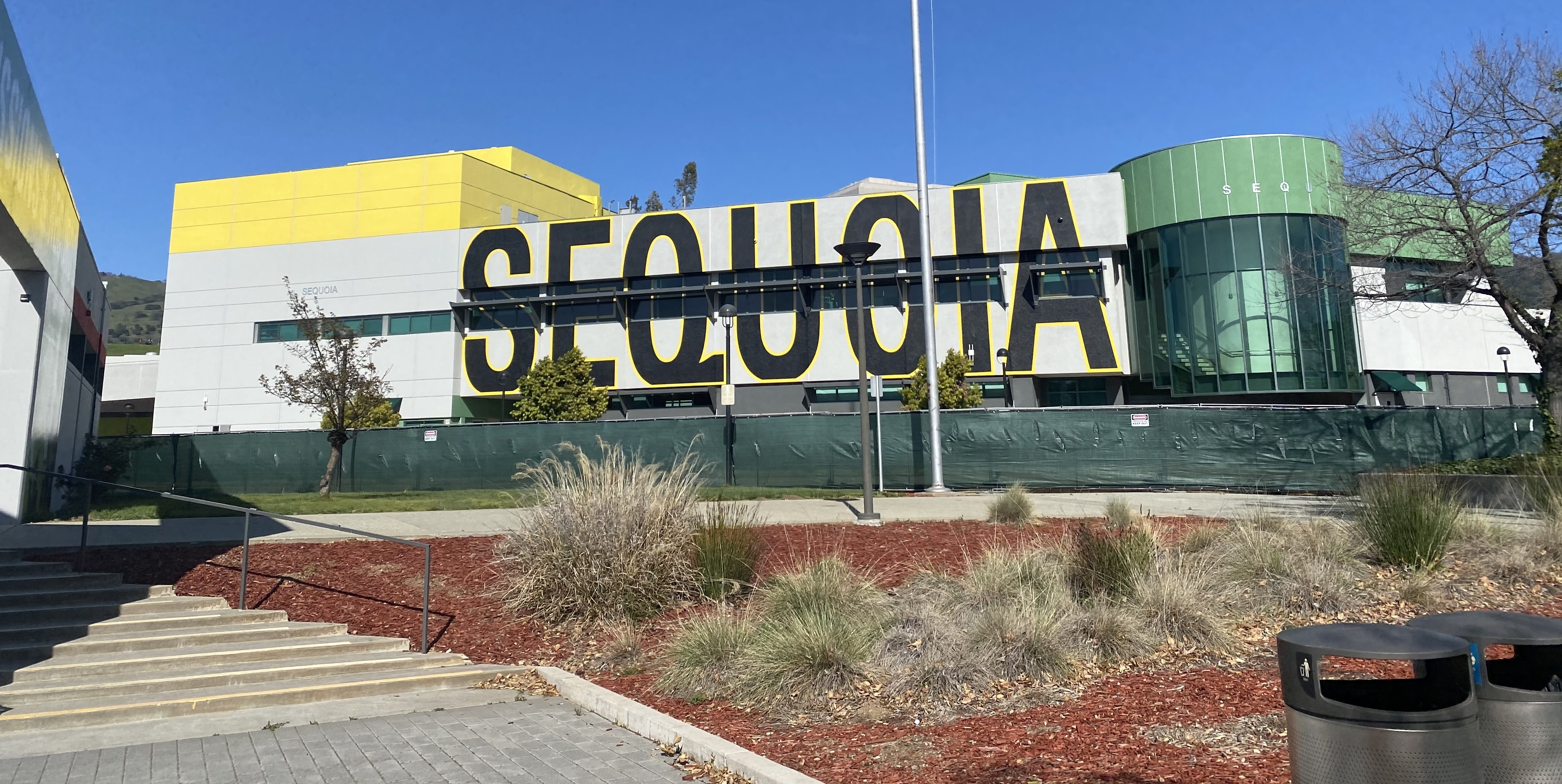
Sequoia Hall.

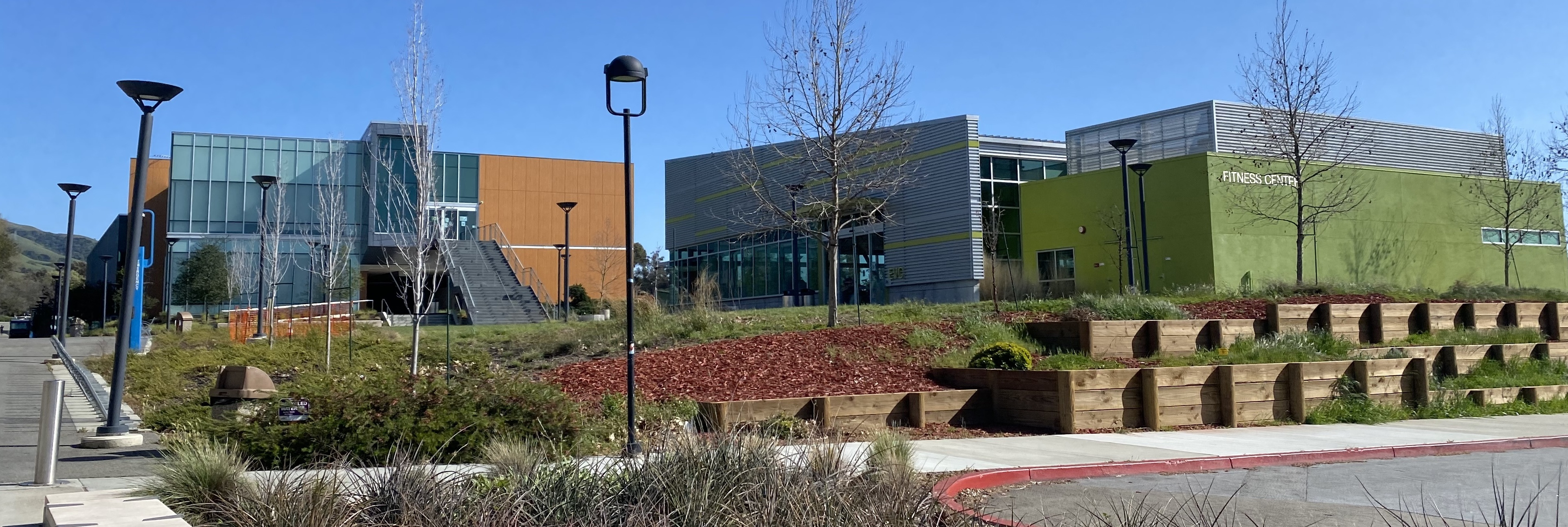
The M+S3 Building (left) and the EVC Fitness Center (right)

Academic divisions at the college include:

- Business and Workforce Development
- Nursing and Allied Health
- Math, Science, and Engineering
- Language Arts
- Library and Learning Resources
- Social Sciences, Humanities, Arts and Physical Education (SSHAPE)

=== Tesla START Program ===
The Tesla START Program is a program jointly run by Tesla, Inc. and EVC. The program is an educational and training partnership between the EVC and the electric carmaker.

== Campus ==
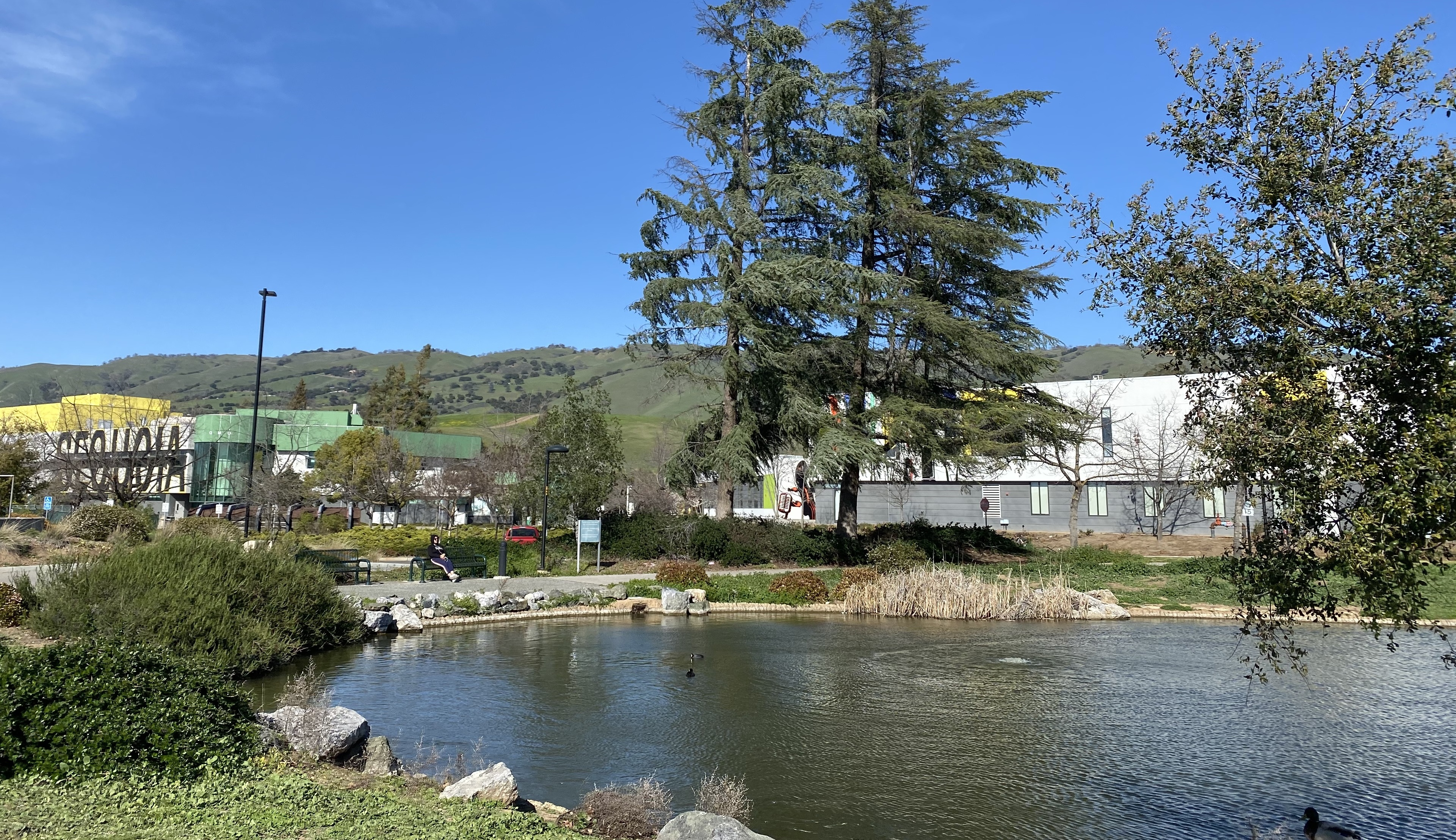
Evergreen Lake is located in the eastern part of EVC's campus.

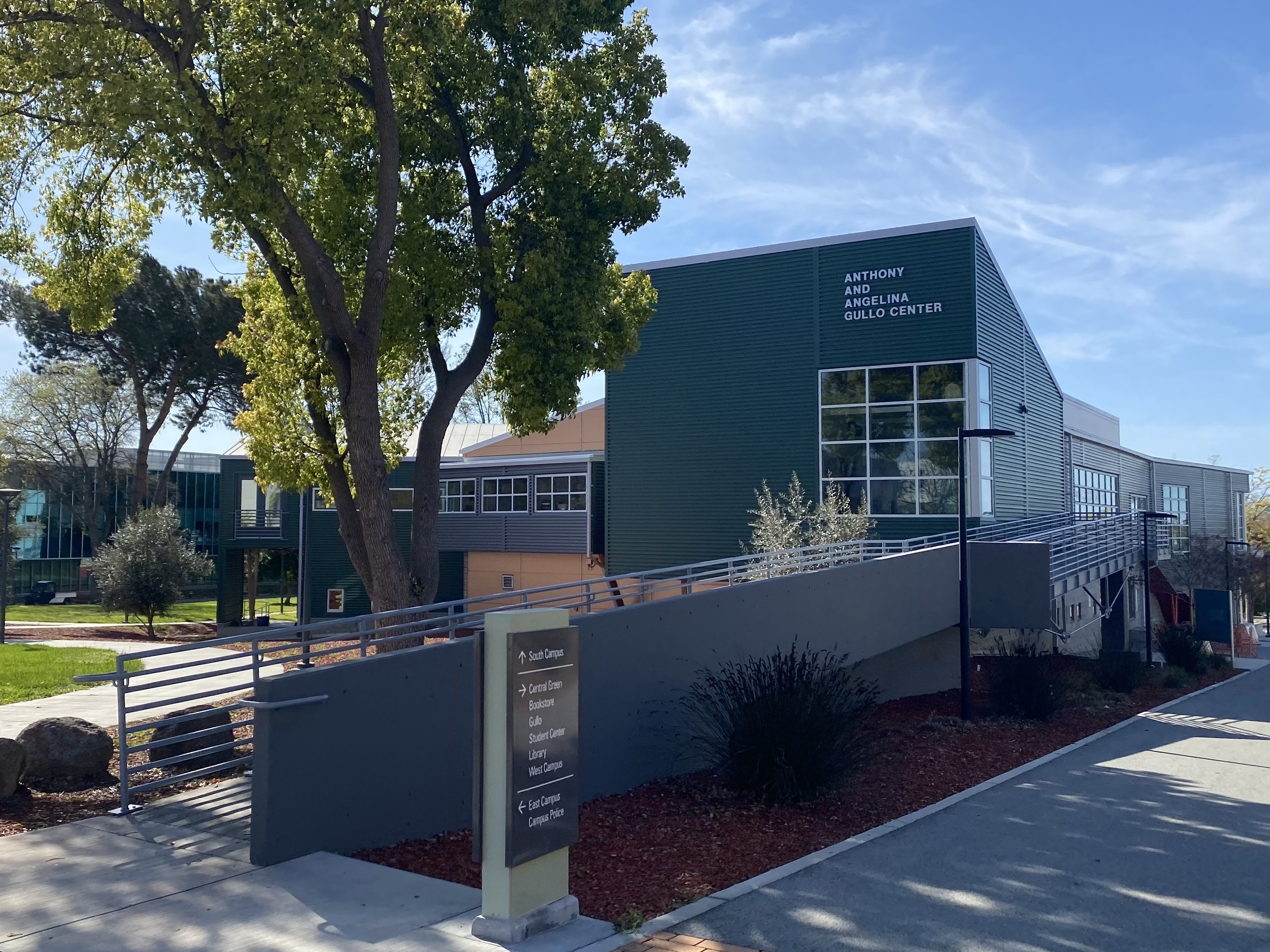
Gullo Center.

Evergreen Valley College's campus is set on 175 acres in the Evergreen district of East San Jose, located at the base of the foothills of the Diablo Range.

Campus buildings include a 400-seat Performing Arts Center, Center for Visual Arts, Sequoia Hall, Acacia Hall, Math, Sciences, & Social Studies Building, Gullo Center, Cedro Hall, Fitness Center, Student Center, Automotive Technology Building, Physical Education Building, Gymnasium, and the Montgomery Hill Observatory.

Montgomery Hill Observatory is regularly open to free public stargazing events.

North of the EVC campus is Montgomery Hill Park, a large city park and the historic site where John Joseph Montgomery conducted his flight experiments on his glider "The Evergreen".

EVC has two primary entrances, the Paseo de Arboles entry from San Felipe Road and the Yerba Buena Road entry.

== Athletics ==
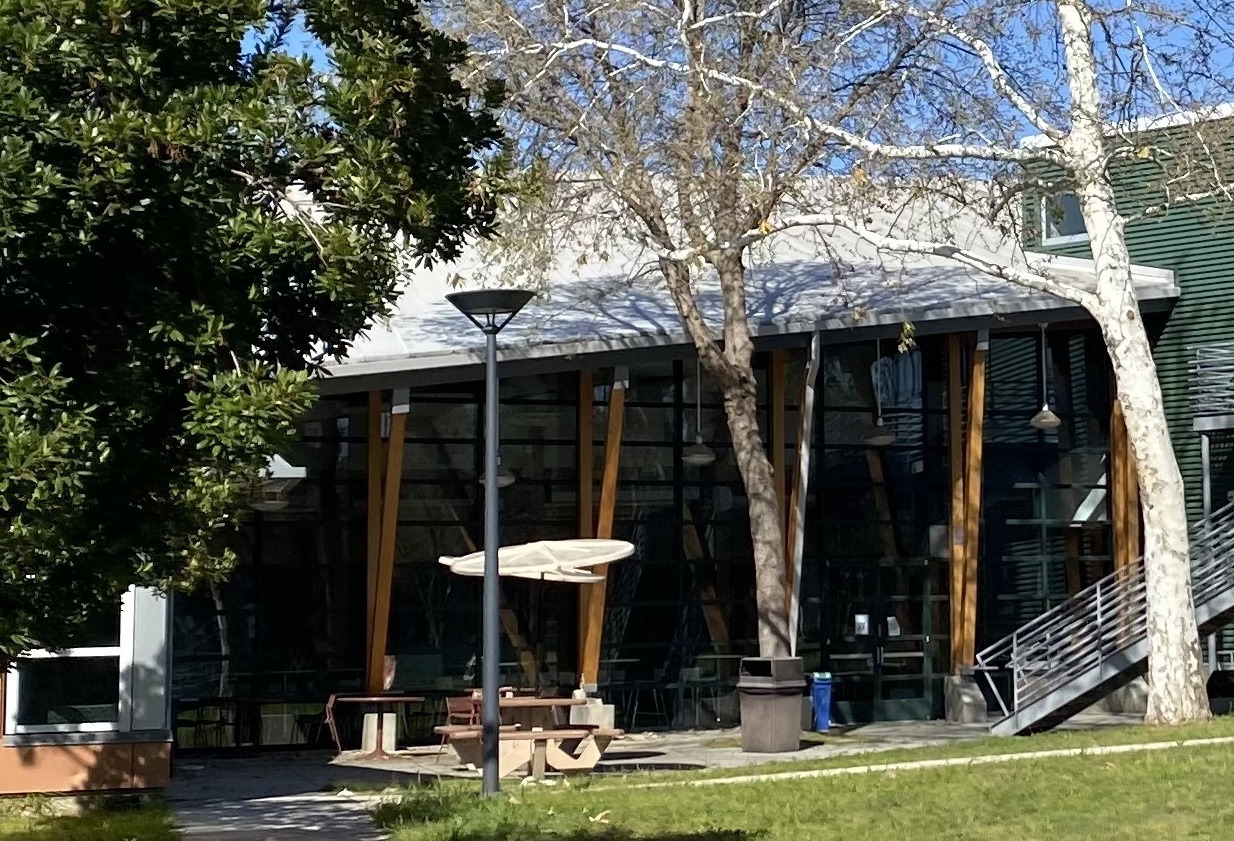
EVC bookstore.

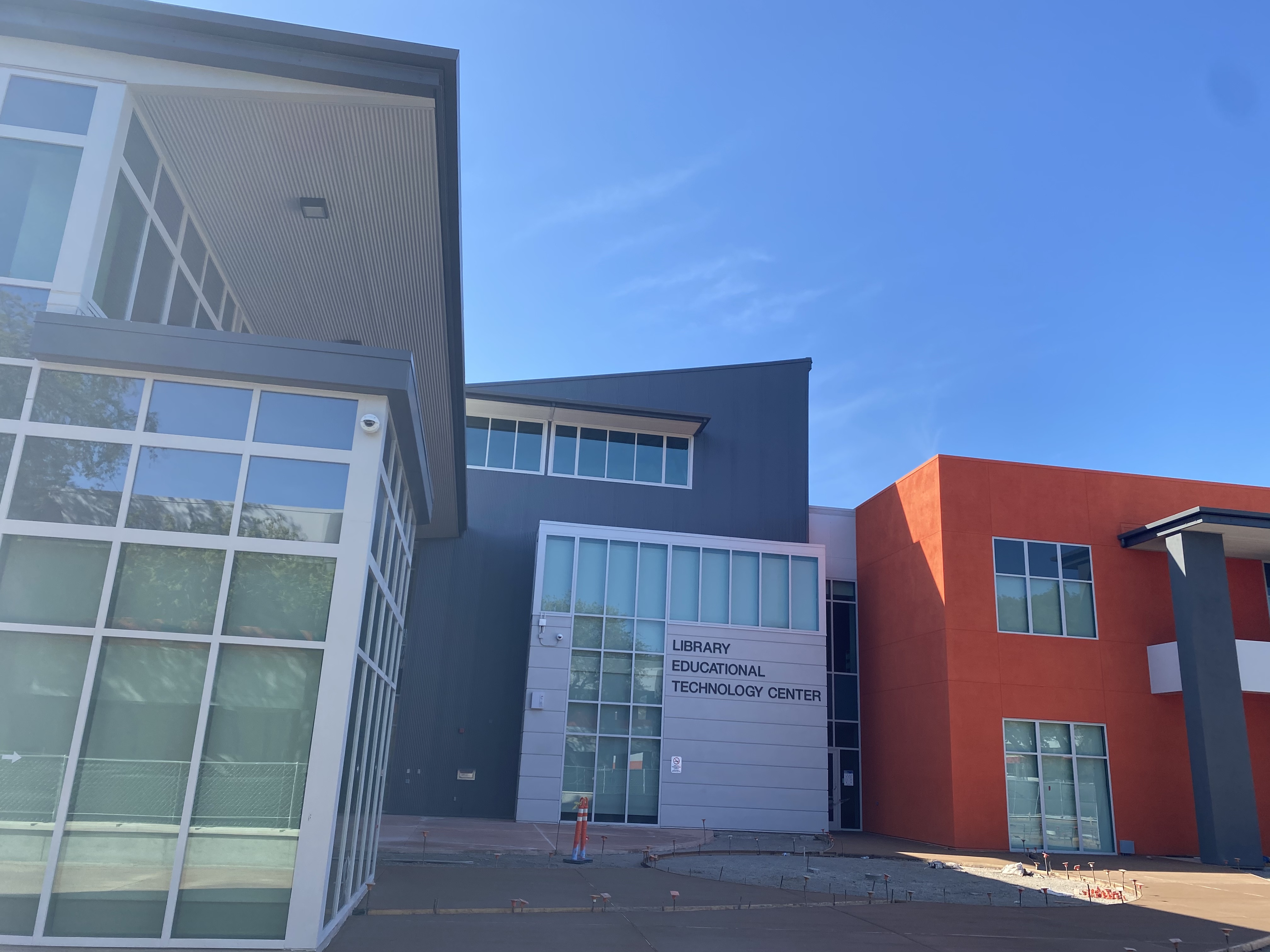
EVC Library and Educational Technology Center.

Evergreen Valley College is a member of the Coast Conference of California Community College Athletic Association. The school mascot is a hawk, and the school colors are green, gray and marigold. The athletic director for Evergreen Valley College is Jaclyn Johnson, while the head coach of Men's Soccer is Simon Cook and the head coach of Women's Soccer is Felicia Perez.

Facilities for athletics include a softball field, turf soccer stadium, eleven tennis courts, a gymnasium, and a large grass field.

Intercollegiate teams include:

- Men's Soccer
- Women's Soccer
- Women's Badminton
