= Los Lupeños de San José =

Mexican folk dance company in San Jose, California

Los Lupeños de San José is a Mexican Folklórico dance company based in San Jose, California. Founded in 1969 by Susan V. Cashion and Ramón Morones Ortiz, it developed as a study and performance group dedicated to Mexican folk dance. The company operates under Cashion Cultural Legacy and is based at the Mexican Heritage Plaza in East San Jose.

== History ==
=== Foundation and early activities ===
Cashion and Morones met in Guadalajara, Mexico, where they studied folklórico. They established Los Lupeños in San José in 1969. Cashion also taught at Stanford University while continuing to direct the company.

The company's early activities included music education as well as dance. In a study of women in California mariachi, Cynthia Reifler Flores describes Cashion's efforts to establish a community mariachi ensemble to accompany the dancers. Instruction was open to interested participants, including women and musicians of different backgrounds. Barbara Pérez-Díaz, whose career is examined in the study, participated as both a dancer and musician. A surviving program documents the company's December 4, 1971 concert at the San Jose Civic Auditorium, with performances by Mariachi Tequilatlán and Mariachi Uclatlán.

An April 1983 article in the San José newspaper Our Paper described the company as "the oldest organized Mexican Folklorico dance company in the Nation".

=== Folklórico organizations and collaborations ===
The founders participated in networks connecting folklórico practitioners across the United States. In a note about the early years of the Asociación Nacional de Grupos Folklóricos (ANGF), dance scholar Gabriela Mendoza-García identifies Cashion and Morones among the California practitioners contacted for the March 1974 national gathering at the University of New Mexico. Her account also reproduces a photograph of Los Lupeños performing Yucatán dances at ANGF in 1975.

Cashion and Morones organized collaborative folklórico concerts in San José in 1977 and brought visiting teachers from Mexico for performances and workshops. Eve Marie Delfin's history distinguishes these gatherings from the later Danzantes Unidos Festival, organized by John Estrada and Sue Welsh at UCLA in 1979. Delfin also documents Los Lupeños' subsequent role in hosting the festival in San José during the 1980s.

=== Transition to Cashion Cultural Legacy ===
In 2014, the non-profit Cashion Cultural Legacy acquired Los Lupeños. A March 2015 interview in In Dance reported the appointment of Samuel Cortez as artistic director. Managing director Tony Ferrigno described the company's work as researching, learning, and staging folk dances, producing concerts, and providing community education through Los Lupeños Academy.

== Repertoire and performance ==
By 2026, the repertoire encompassed dances from almost every region of Mexico and works based on early California history. Cashion described the company's interpretation as shaped by its California dancers' experiences as well as Mexican traditions.

The founders created Mextizol, a dance drama about mestizo culture that premiered in the mid-1970s and toured the southwestern United States in several versions. A 2001 Los Angeles Times review examined the company's performance at Caltech.

The Library of Congress documents musician Artemio Posadas's work accompanying the company and advising it on traditional son huasteco music and dance.

=== Californio repertoire ===
The company's repertoire has included dances associated with Mexican California. A 2004 newspaper announcement listed its dancers in Fandango IV—Songs & Dances from Mexican California at the Presidio of San Francisco, alongside Coro Hispano de San Francisco, Conjunto Nuevo Mundo, and Cascada de Flores.

In November 2023, with the help of a National Endowment for the Arts grant, the company presented Los Californios, Carnaval del Cascarón as part of Etnofonías, Los Sonidos de México at the Mexican Heritage Plaza. The concert program describes the suite as a tribute to Mexican traditions of Alta California and credits collaborators including Los Arribeños de San Francisco.

== Education and cultural preservation ==
Los Lupeños Academy offers folklórico instruction at the Mexican Heritage Plaza. Its classes serve students of all ages and they are offered in partnership with the Mexican Heritage Plaza. Cashion Cultural Legacy also operates the Los Lupeños Juvenil youth ensemble.

In 2006, the Alliance for California Traditional Arts awarded Los Lupeños a Living Cultures grant to inventory its costume and prop collection and improve storage. ACTA described the collection as consisting largely of handmade traditional costumes accumulated since the company's founding.

== Archives and exhibitions ==
The San José Public Library's California Room lists the Los Lupeños de San José Records, a collection containing administrative papers, correspondence, newspaper clippings, photographs, ephemera, and audiovisual material. In 2024, a Dance/USA archiving fellowship supported work on Cashion Cultural Legacy's digital records, including naming conventions and organization of archival files.

In 2026, San José State University's Dr. Martin Luther King Jr. Library listed ¡Que Viva!: Honoring Mexican Heritage Through Music and Dance, a photographic exhibition at its Africana, Asian American, Chicano, Native American Studies Center featuring Los Lupeños and Mariachi Vargas de Tecalitlán.
