= Sofia Mendoza =

- Born: Sofia Mendoza; December 22, 1934; Fillmore, California
- Died: March 14, 2015 (aged 80); San Jose, California
- Occupation: Civil Rights Activist
- Organization: Community Alert Patrol (CAP)
- Known for: Roosevelt Junior High School Walkout
- Spouse: Gilbert Mendoza

Sofia Mendoza (December 22, 1934 - March 14, 2015) was an activist and social organizer, most active in San Jose, California, who co-founded the United People Arriba organization alongside her husband, as well as the Community Alert Patrol (CAP). Her efforts focused around issues of education, police brutality, healthcare, and housing, particularly in the community of East San Jose.

== Early life and education ==
Mendoza was born on December 22, 1934, in the city of Fillmore, California to parents Tiburcio and Margarita Magdalena. Her parents had fled Mexico after losing their family farm. Mendoza was the oldest of five children and had two younger brothers and two younger sisters. She was born in Fillmore while her father worked as a labor organizer in the Sespe Ranch, a large ranch in the city. There he helped organize citrus fruit and avocado pickers. In 1941, Mendoza's father helped the ranch workers go on strike and demand better working conditions and wages.

Mendoza's family moved to Arizona shortly after so that her father could help organize copper workers into the Miners Smelting Workers Union, where he gained the position of officer. After their time in Arizona, Mendoza's family moved back to California and settled in Campbell, California, then a township of San Jose. There, she attended Campbell Grammar School, and Campbell High School. It was during her time in high school that Mendoza began organization drives of various kinds, after witnessing her father do it for so many years. As a freshman at Campbell High School, Mendoza successfully petitioned her classmates and faculty members for the addition of a Spanish club on campus.

After high school, Mendoza enrolled in San Jose State University, where she attended three years before dropping out when she married and became pregnant with her first child. She never returned to finish her last year of college.

== Activism ==
While living in San Jose during the 1960s and 1970s, Mendoza witnessed the increasing tensions between Anglo-American and Mexican American residents of the city. In 1967, she worked to address cases of discrimination faced by Mexican American students at Roosevelt Junior High School, the same school that her own children attended. There were claims that white teachers and students in the school were calling African American and Mexican American students derogatory names. Parents also claimed there were incidents in which the students were singled out and punished physically by the teachers, or they were being expelled for minor violations. Other Mexican American students also claimed they were denied of proper textbooks because teachers said they were not responsible enough to take care of them. In response to the accusations, Mendoza began interviewing several parents of Mexican American students and documented what they said about how their children were being treated at Roosevelt Junior High School. Mendoza took the parents' grievances to the school's Parent Teacher Association (PTA). Because she felt not enough was being done by the PTA to address the parents' concerns, Mendoza helped organize a school walkout. Roosevelt faculty members Jose Carrasco and Consuelo Rodriguez helped Mendoza organize the walkout. On April 29, 1968, students from Roosevelt Junior High School walked out of classes during school hours and walked the streets of San Jose, making this one of the first documented walkouts by Mexican American students. Shortly after the walk out, the students held a rally at school, leading to the principal, vice-principal, and several other faculty members being fired from the school.

The Roosevelt Junior High School walkout marked the beginning of Mendoza's work for the improvement of Mexican American communities in San Jose. Inspired by the Community Service Organization (CSO) which Cesar Chavez had been a part of, in 1968, Mendoza and her husband, Gilbert Mendoza, founded United People Arriba (UPA). Mendoza's husband had attended Westminster School while it was still segregated before Mendez v. Westminster. UPA had the mission of addressing issues faced by all communities in the city, not just those most important to the Mexican American community. The organization did not limit itself to a specific issue, but rather throughout the years worked to address issues brought up by community members in regards to education, health care, housing, police brutality, and immigration among others. The UPA became an independent organization which relied mostly on fundraising and donations to continue operating.

=== Police brutality ===
Amidst the increasing hostilities between members of the San Jose Police Department and Mexican American residents of San Jose, Mendoza and other members of UPA came together to form Community Alert Patrol (CAP). CAP's goal was to prevent further events of violence against Mexican Americans in the hands of San Jose police officers. When it was first founded, CAP was set up in Our Lady of Guadalupe Church in East San Jose. Many of those who joined were members of the communities which were affected. Members of CAP worked Friday and Saturday nights to prevent and document incidents of police brutality. Members used a radio system to interfere calls done to the San Jose Police Department. Then, they would attempt to arrive at the scene before the police authorities to record the interactions, wishing to record any events of violence which could be used as evidence of police brutality against the Mexican American residents of San Jose in the hands of the San Jose Police Department. Mendoza also helped lead a 2000-person march to City Hall in protest of the incidents of police brutality against the Mexican-American community, some of which she testifies to have witnessed. "'I saw cops kicking down doors in the East Side," Mendoza says, "I saw it with my own two eyes. I saw policemen stopping people for traffic infractions at gunpoint."' Due to Mendoza and CAP's efforts, San Jose created the Office of the Independent Police Auditor, and Mendoza joined the Independent Police Auditor Advisory Committee.

=== Health care ===
After moving permanently to San Jose with her husband, she noticed that many of the Chicano children in her community were missing immunizations. So, Mendoza and UPA began demanding the San Jose city administrators to sponsor a mass immunization program. The city agreed, and many Mexican American families showed up to the program to receive immunizations. The overwhelming influx of Mexican Americans prompted Mendoza to demand a neighborhood clinic be set up in East San Jose. However, the city administration did not agree to the health clinic, but instead provided bus transportation for families living in East San Jose to travel to the closest clinic in the northern part of the city. Unsatisfied with the response, Mendoza and members of the UPA began convincing families to refuse to use the city-sponsored bus transportation as a sign of protest. UPA promised to provide free rides to families who needed to visit the clinic if they protested the use of the city buses. Eventually, the city agreed to the opening of a neighborhood clinic in East Side San Jose, and as a result, the East Valley Medical Center was opened.

== Personal life ==
Mendoza married her husband Gilbert Mendoza while she was in her third year of school at San Jose State University. Together, they had four children: two sons and two daughters.

After suffering several years from kidney failure, Mendoza died on March 14, 2015, at the age of 80 in San Jose, California. This occurred a day before she was scheduled to undergo a surgery for an abdominal growth at Kaiser Permanente Hospital.
