= Mayfair, San Jose =

Mayfair
- Neighborhood of San Jose
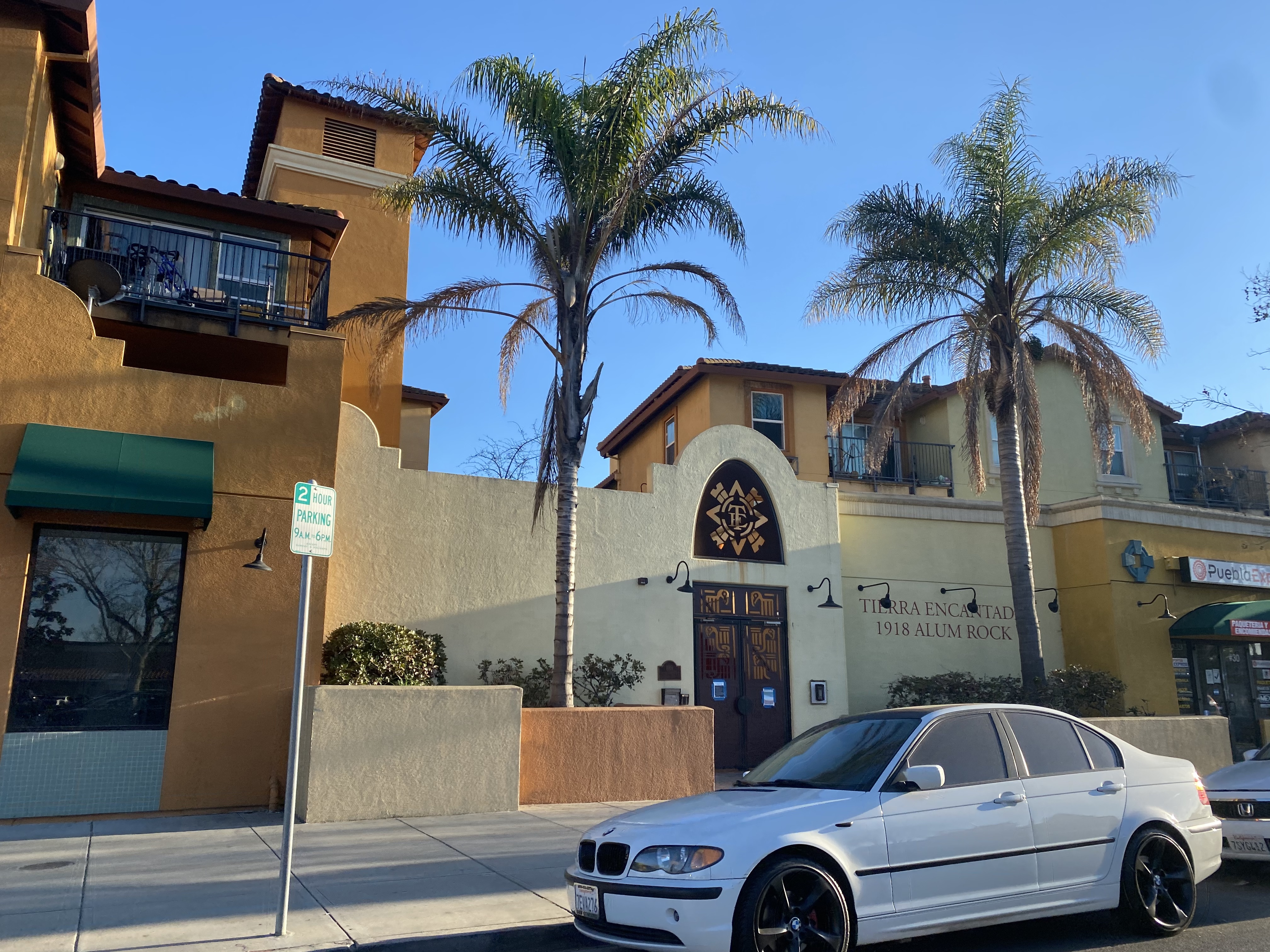
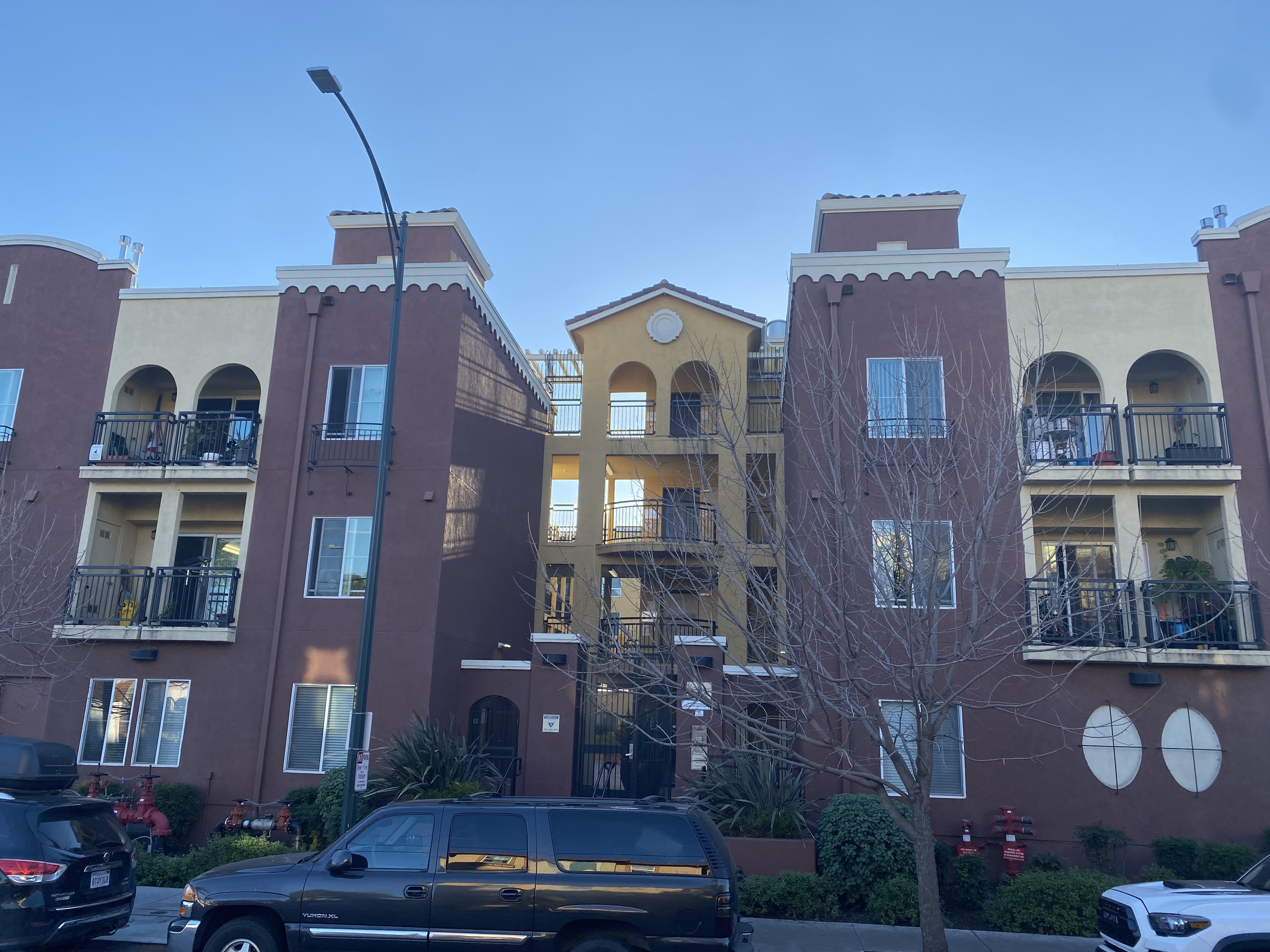
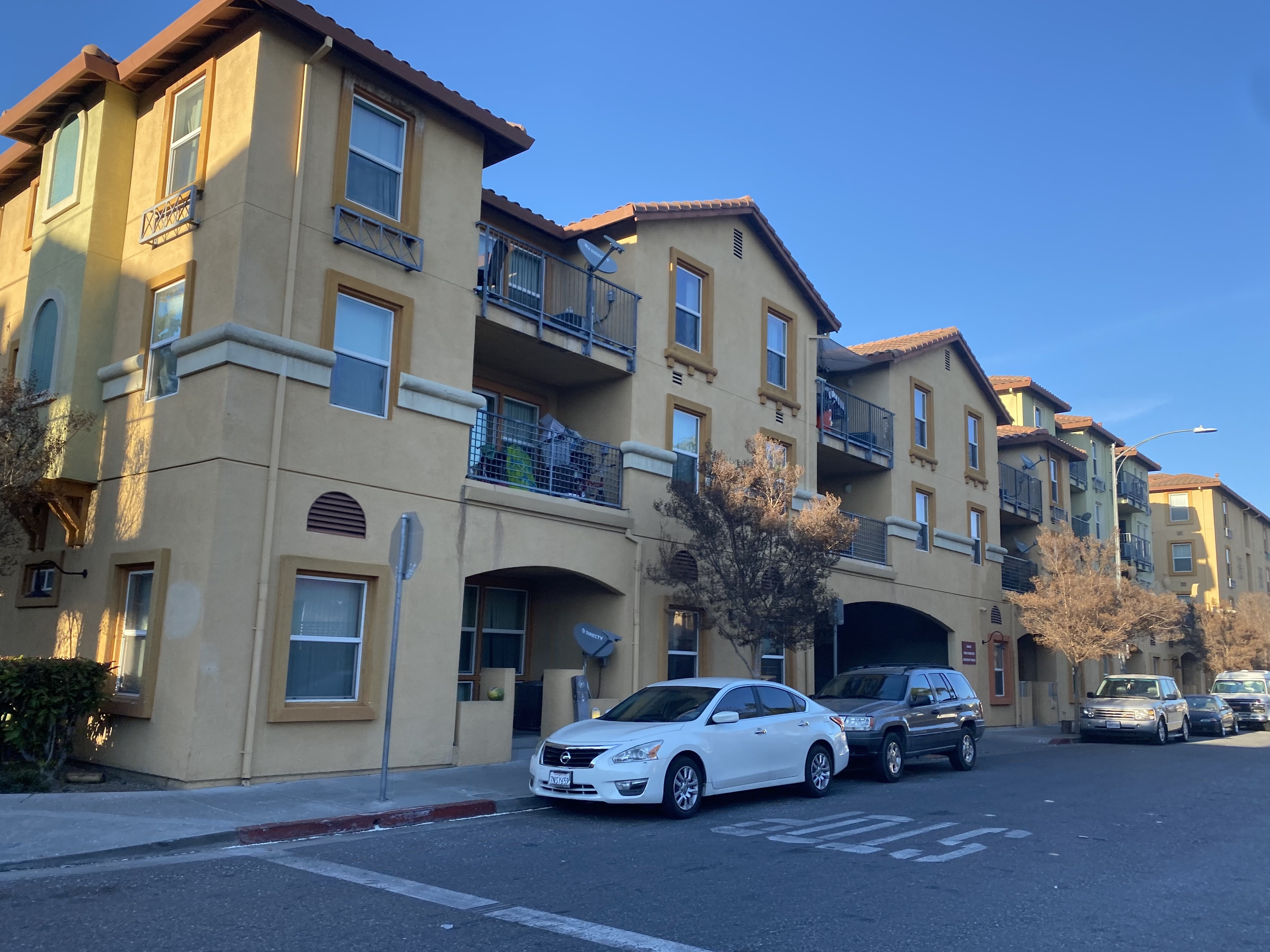
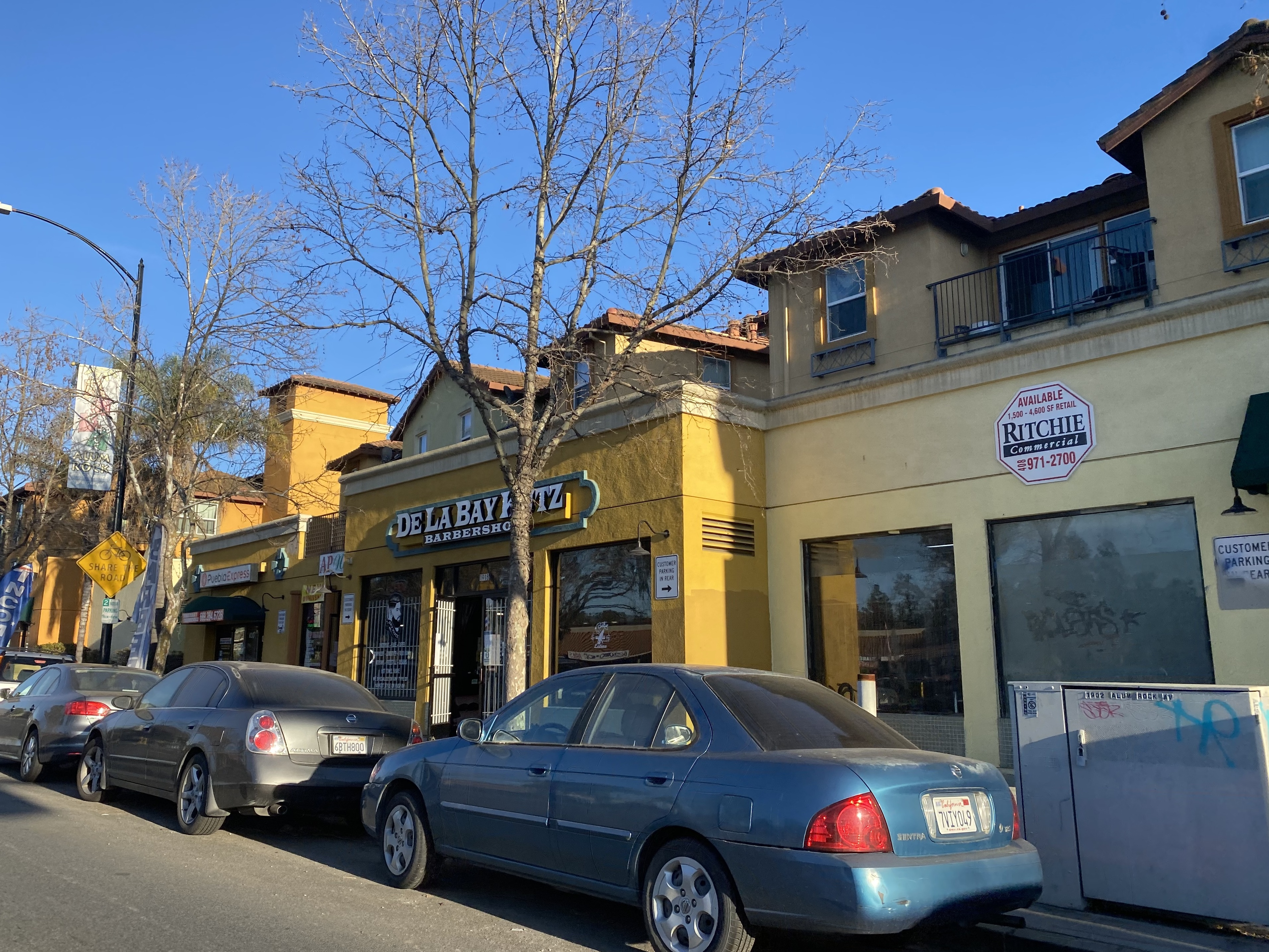

- Location within San Jose, California
- Coordinates: 37.351686°N 121.843315°W
- Country: United States
- State: California
- City: San Jose
- Area code: Area code 408

Mayfair is a neighborhood of San Jose, California, located in the Alum Rock district of East San Jose. It is one of San Jose's most historic Chicano/Mexican-American districts and noted for being a center of the Chicano Movement and grassroots activists such as Californian civil rights leader César Chávez.

== History ==
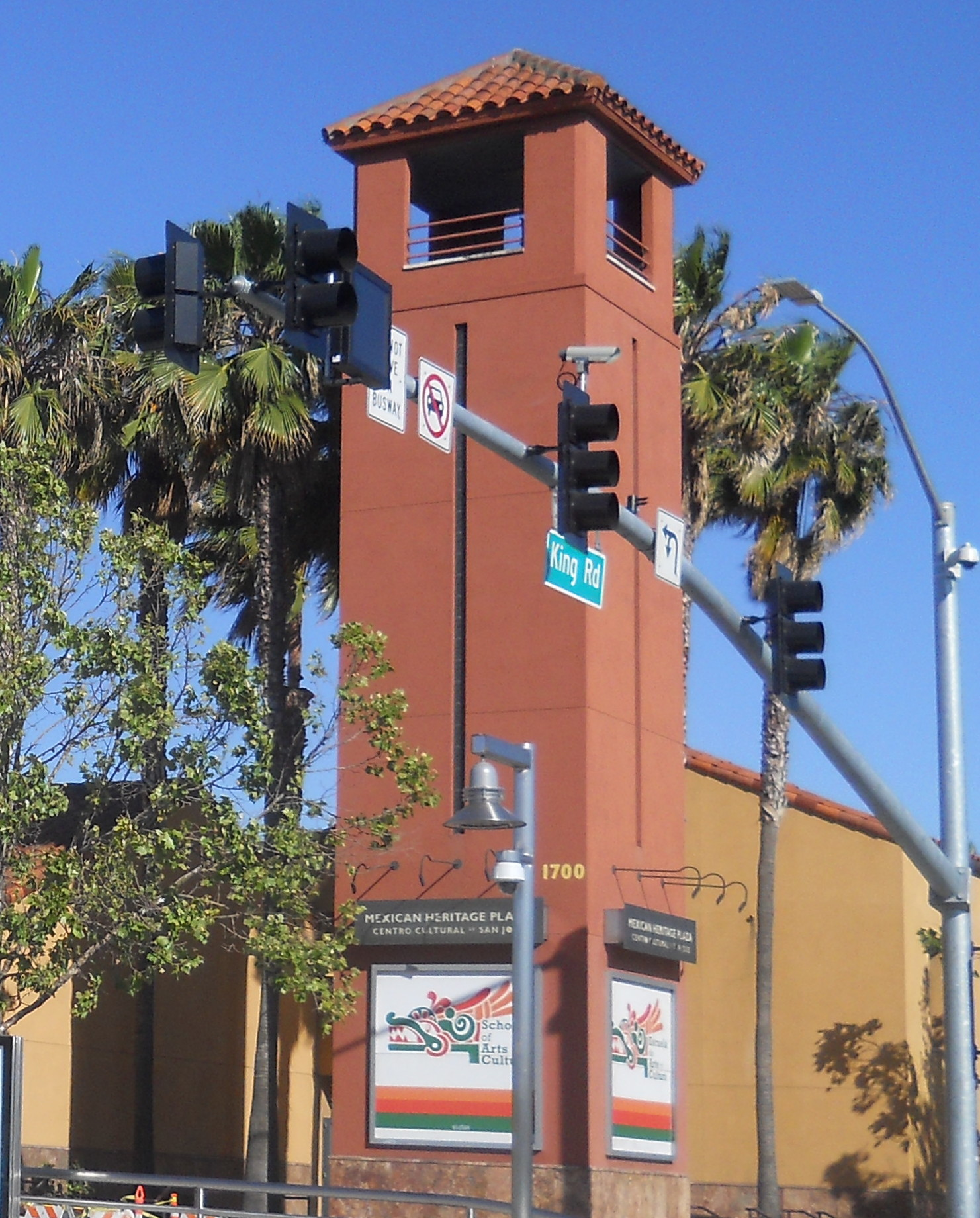
Mexican Heritage Plaza.

Mayfair has been a working-class, Chicano/Mexican-American neighborhood since its foundation in the early 1900s.

Mayfair is best known for its historical association with Californian civil rights activist César Chávez, who lived in the neighborhood in the 1950s and began his career as a grassroots activist at Our Lady of Guadalupe Church in Mayfair.

In the 1960s and 70's, Mayfair became a hub of the Chicano Movement and continues to serve as a center of Chicano art and culture.

In 2008, the Garden of Strength art installation, by artist Fernanda D'Agostino, was installed at the Mayfair Community Center. Divided into three individual art pieces, called Bienvenidos, Garden of Life, and The Three Sisters', the art installation was inspired by the diversity and the rich cultural history of the Mayfair area and by the spirit of growth embodied in the Mayfair Community Garden adjacent to the site.

== Geography ==
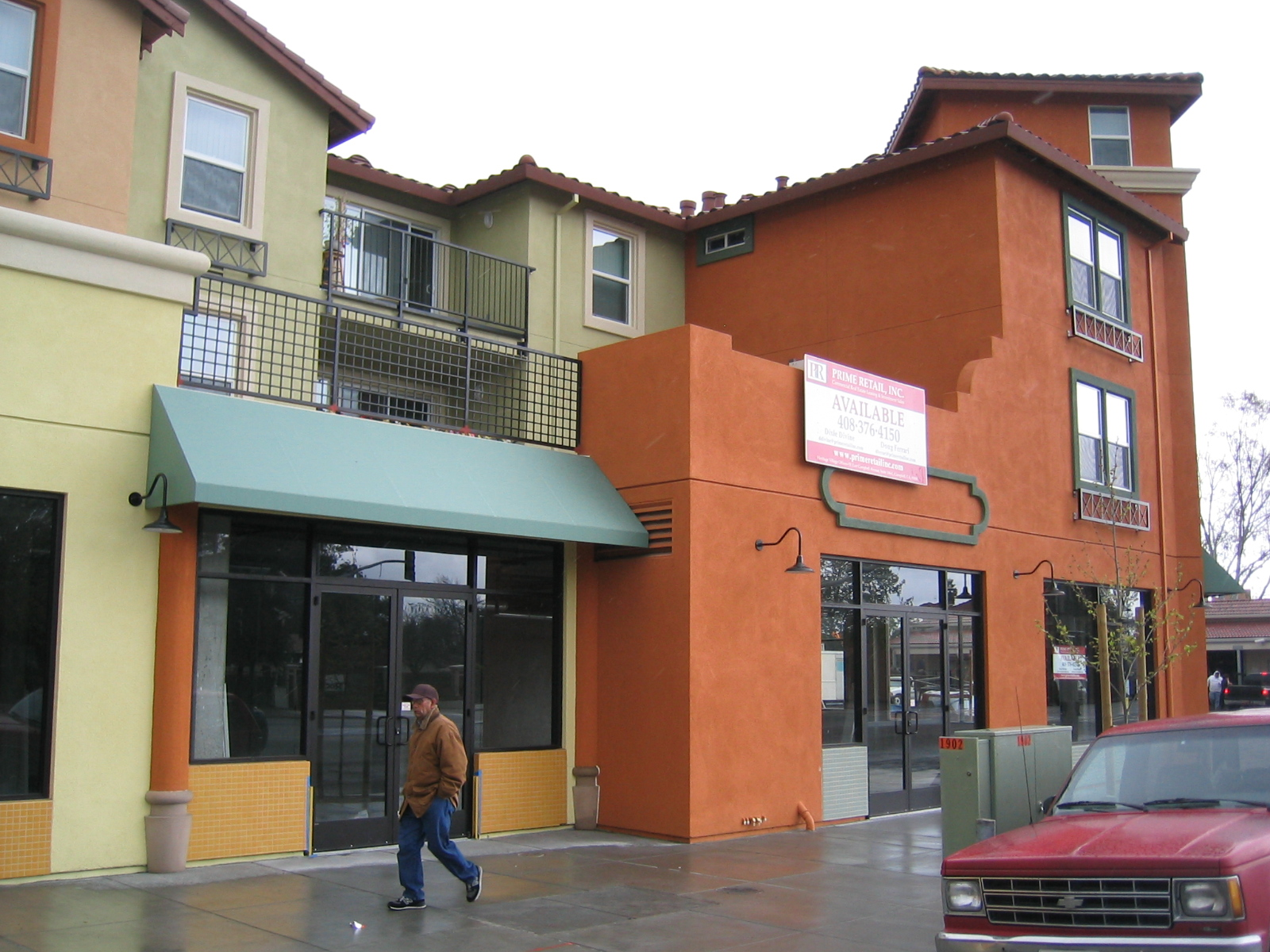
Shops on Alum Rock Ave.

Mayfair is located within East San Jose. It is east of Little Portugal, which it borders at King Road. The Sinclair Freeway (CA-680) forms Mayfair's eastern and southern border, separating it from the King & Story neighborhood to the south and from the Alum Rock district to the east.

== Culture ==
Mayfair is an important center for Chicano art and Chicano/Mexican-American culture. It hosts the Mexican Heritage Plaza, a notable cultural center and school of Chicano/Mexican arts.

The neighborhood hosts the Mayferia (portmanteau of "Mayfair" and "feria", Spanish for fair), a celebration of the community and greater East San Jose's Chicano/Mexican heritage.

== Education ==
Mayfair is served by the Alum Rock Union School District, which operates:

- César Chávez Elementary School
- San Antonio Elementary School

== Parks and plazas ==
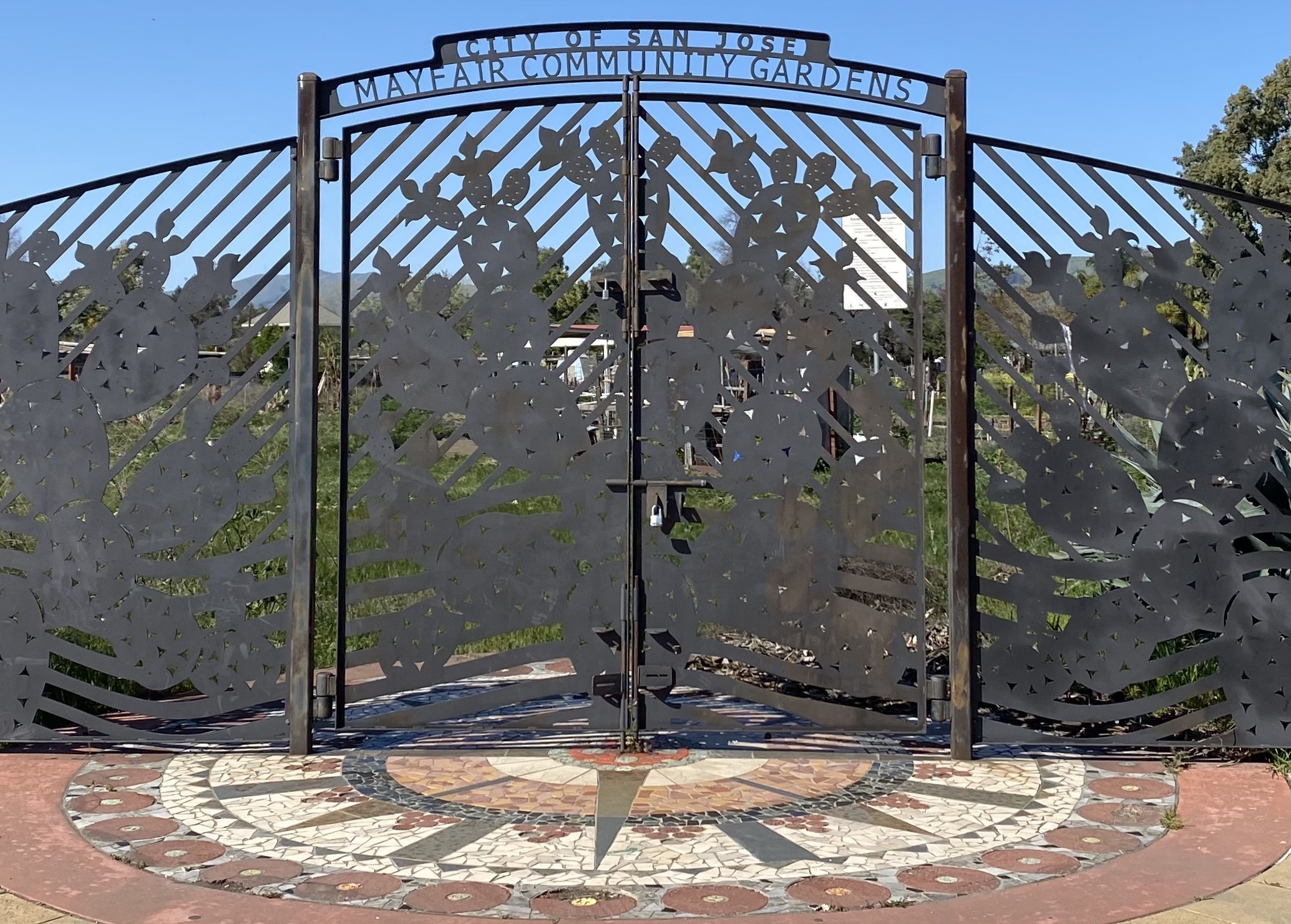
Mayfair Community Gardens.

- Rancho del Pueblo Municipal Golf Course
- Mayfair Park
- Mayfair Community Gardens
- Parque de la Amistad
- Mayfair Skatepark
- Zolezzi Park
- Mexican Heritage Plaza

== Landmarks ==
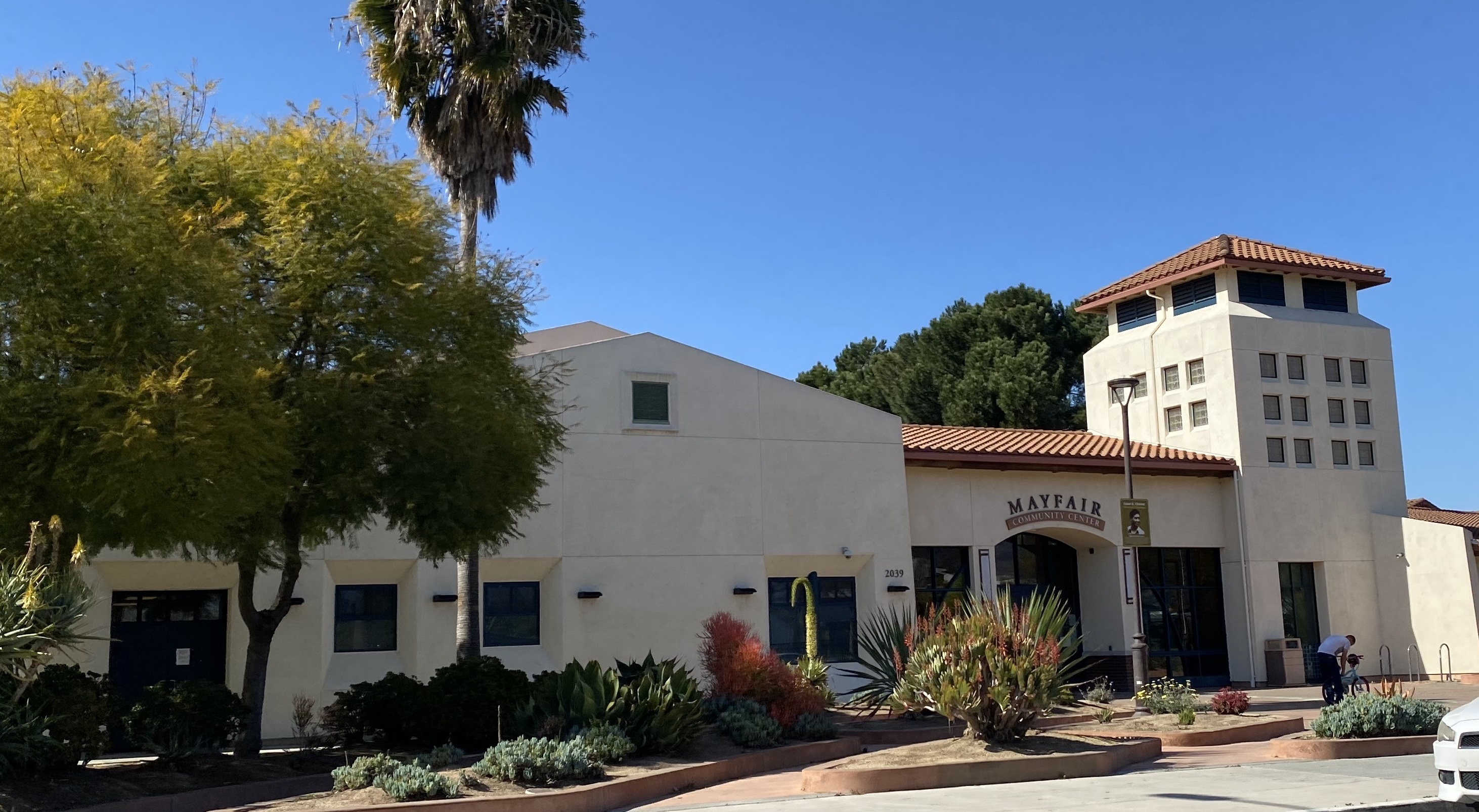
Mayfair Community Center.

- The César Chávez Memorial Walkway is a 5-mile long walking path stretching from Plaza de César Chávez in Downtown passes through Paseo de César Chávez at San José State University and onwards to five sites located in Mayfair:
  - Mexican Heritage Plaza
  - Mayfair Community Center
  - César Chávez Elementary School
  - Our Lady of Guadalupe Church
  - Chávez Family Home

== Gallery ==
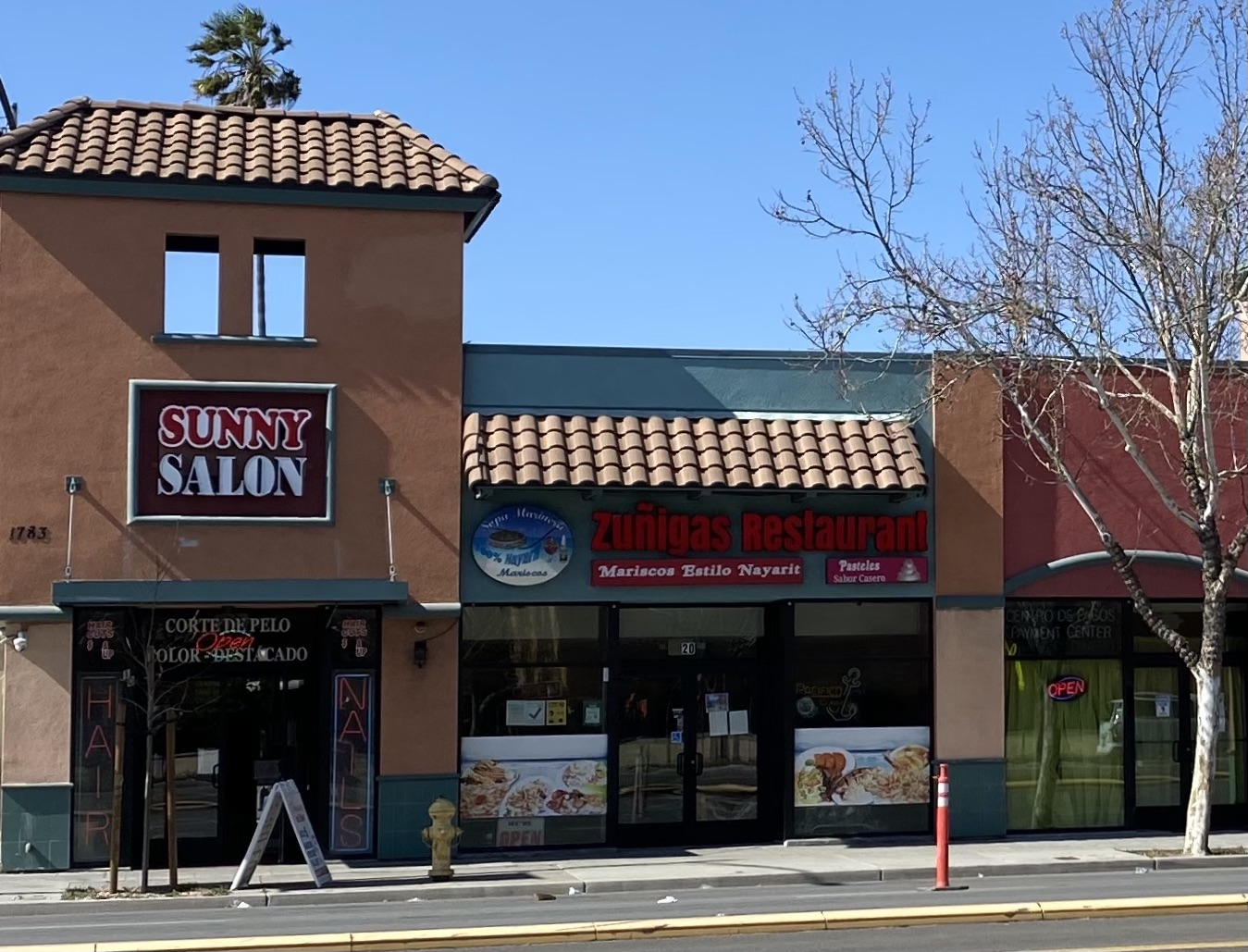
Shops along Alum Rock Ave.

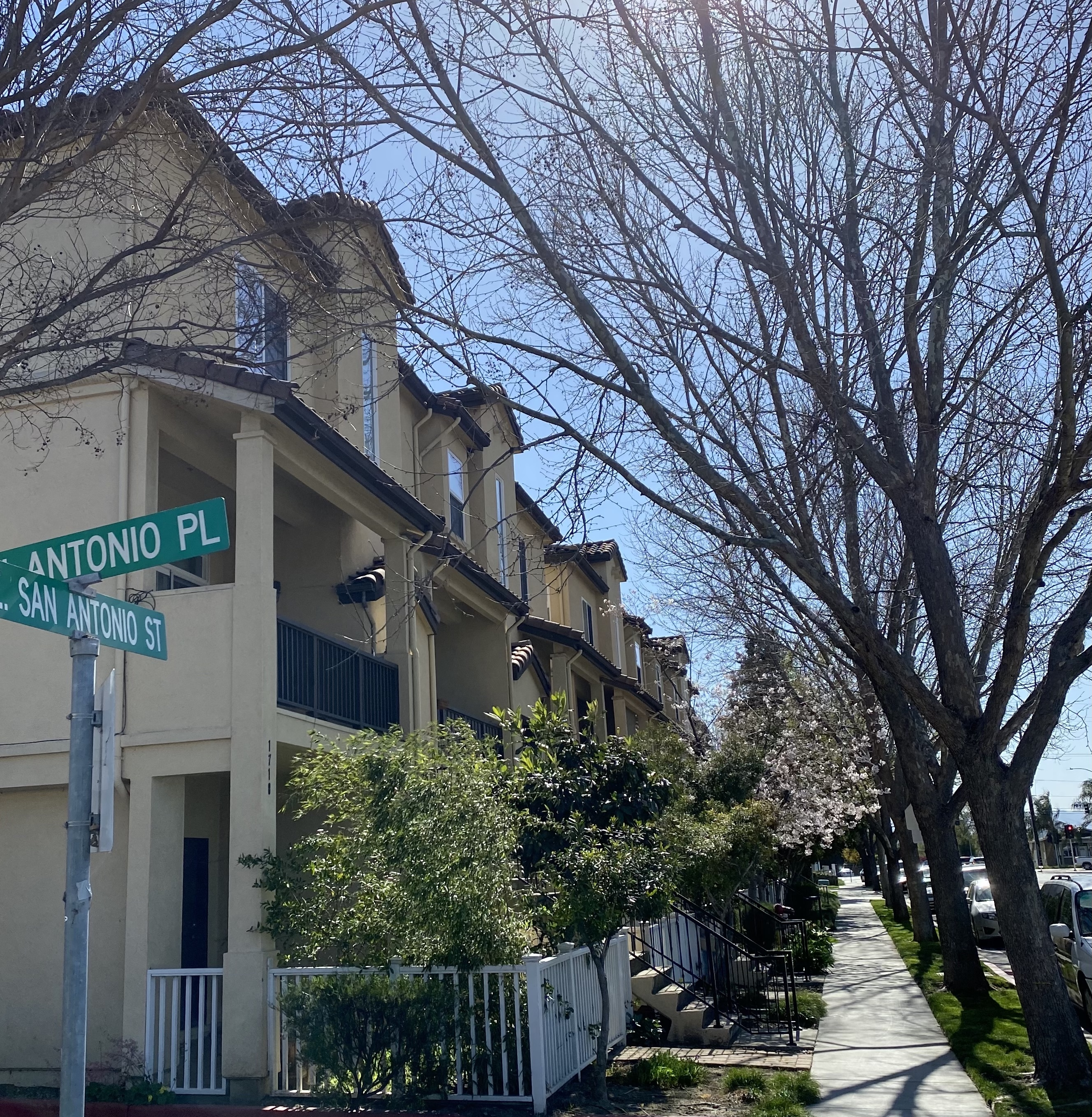
Townhomes on San Antonio St.

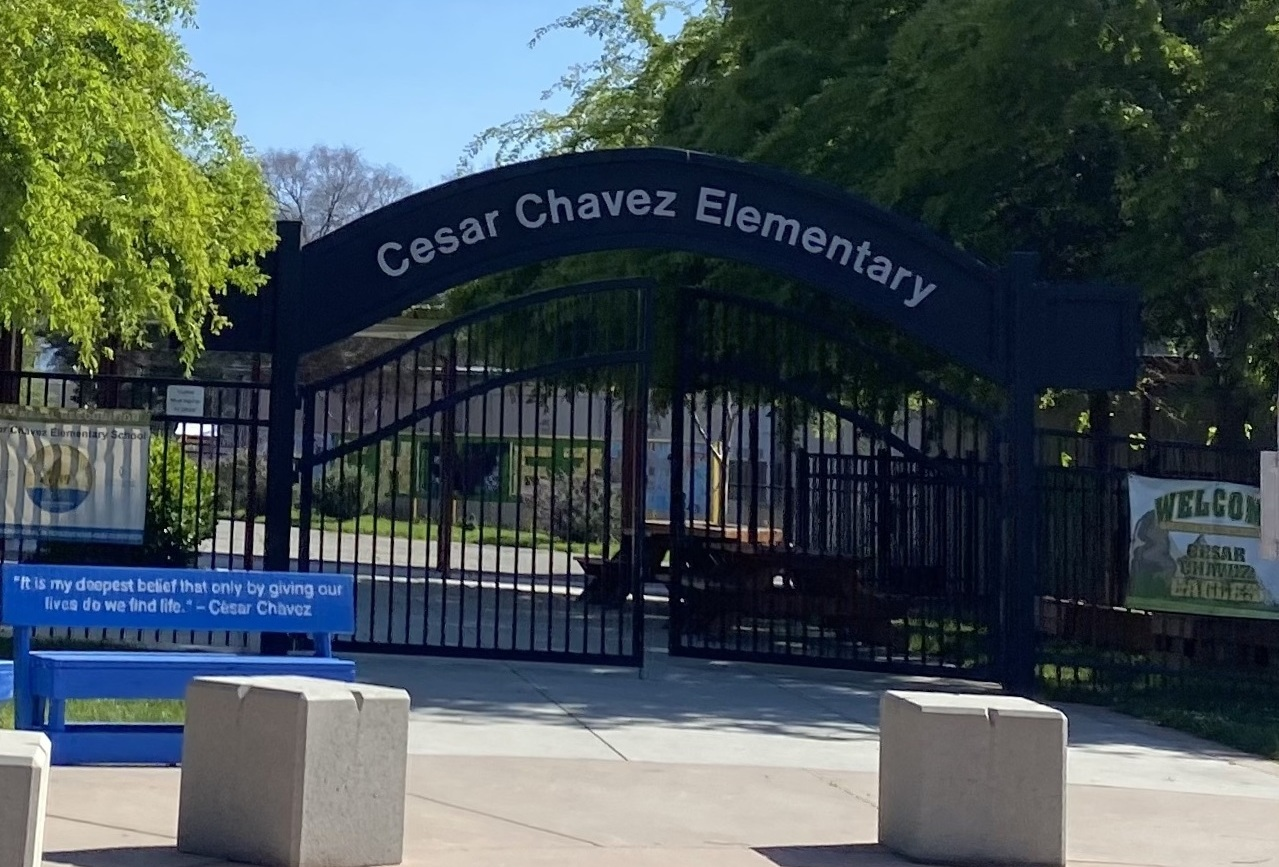
César Chávez Elementary School

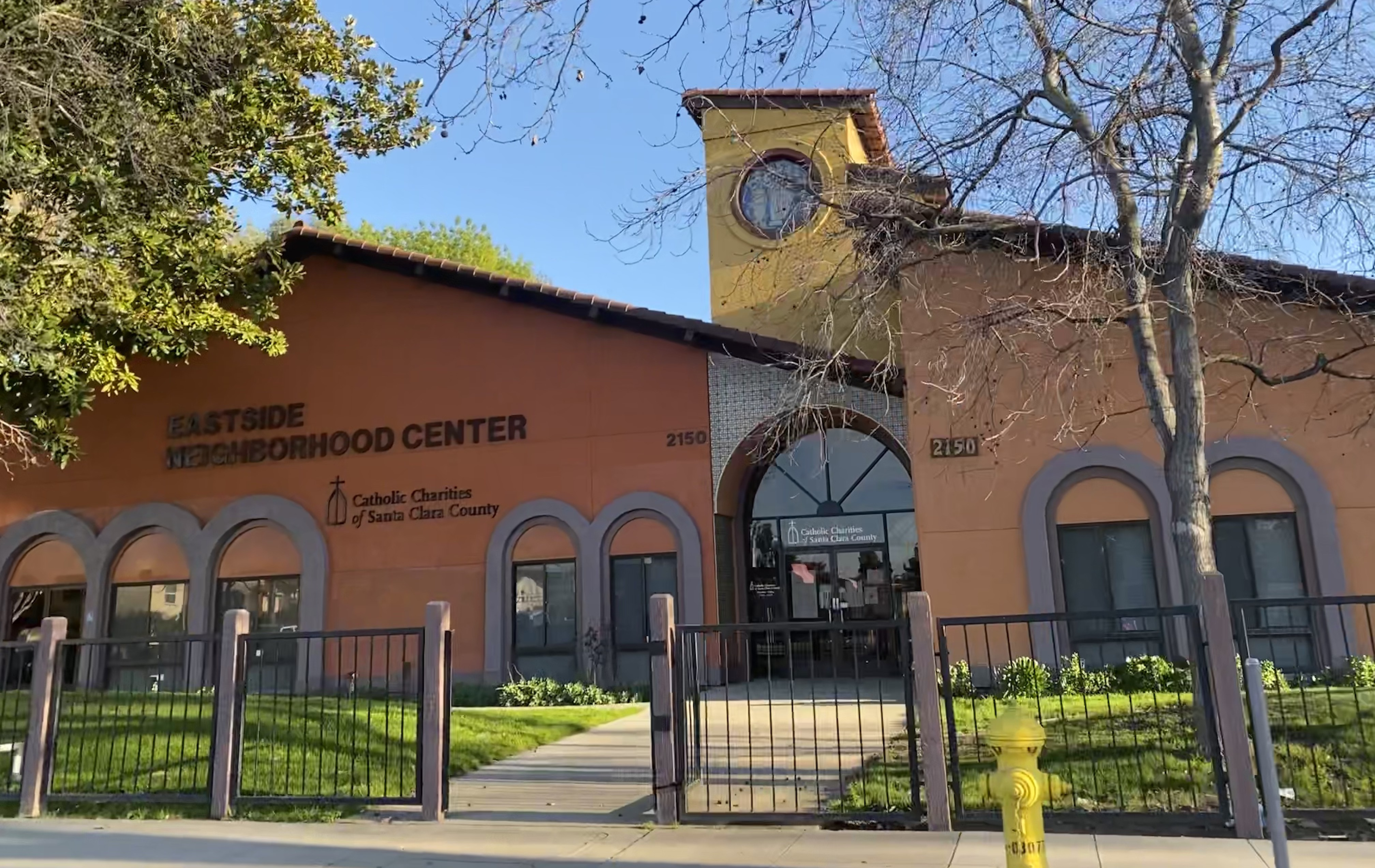
Eastside Neighborhood Center of the Diocese of San Jose charities

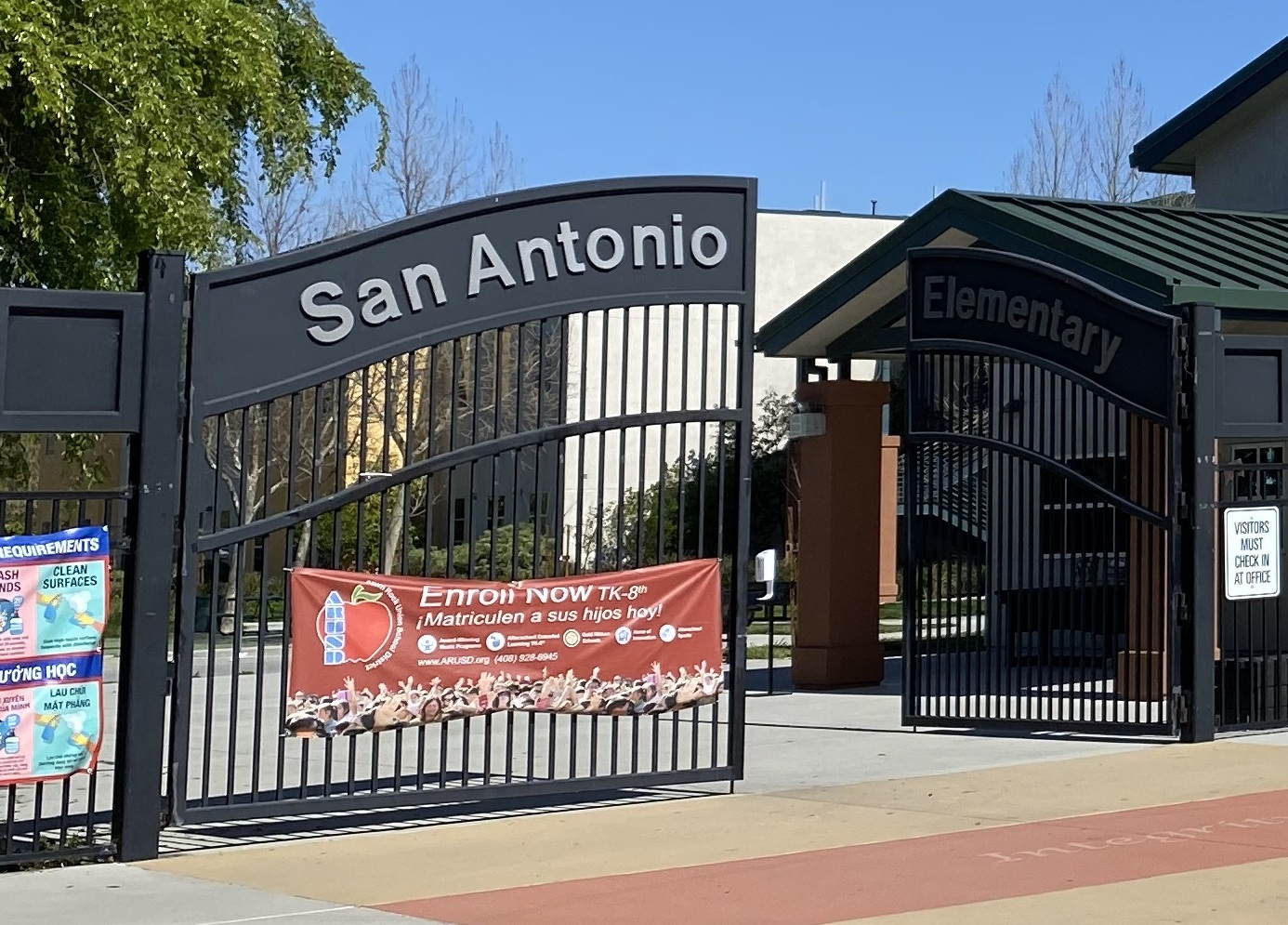
San Antonio Elementary School

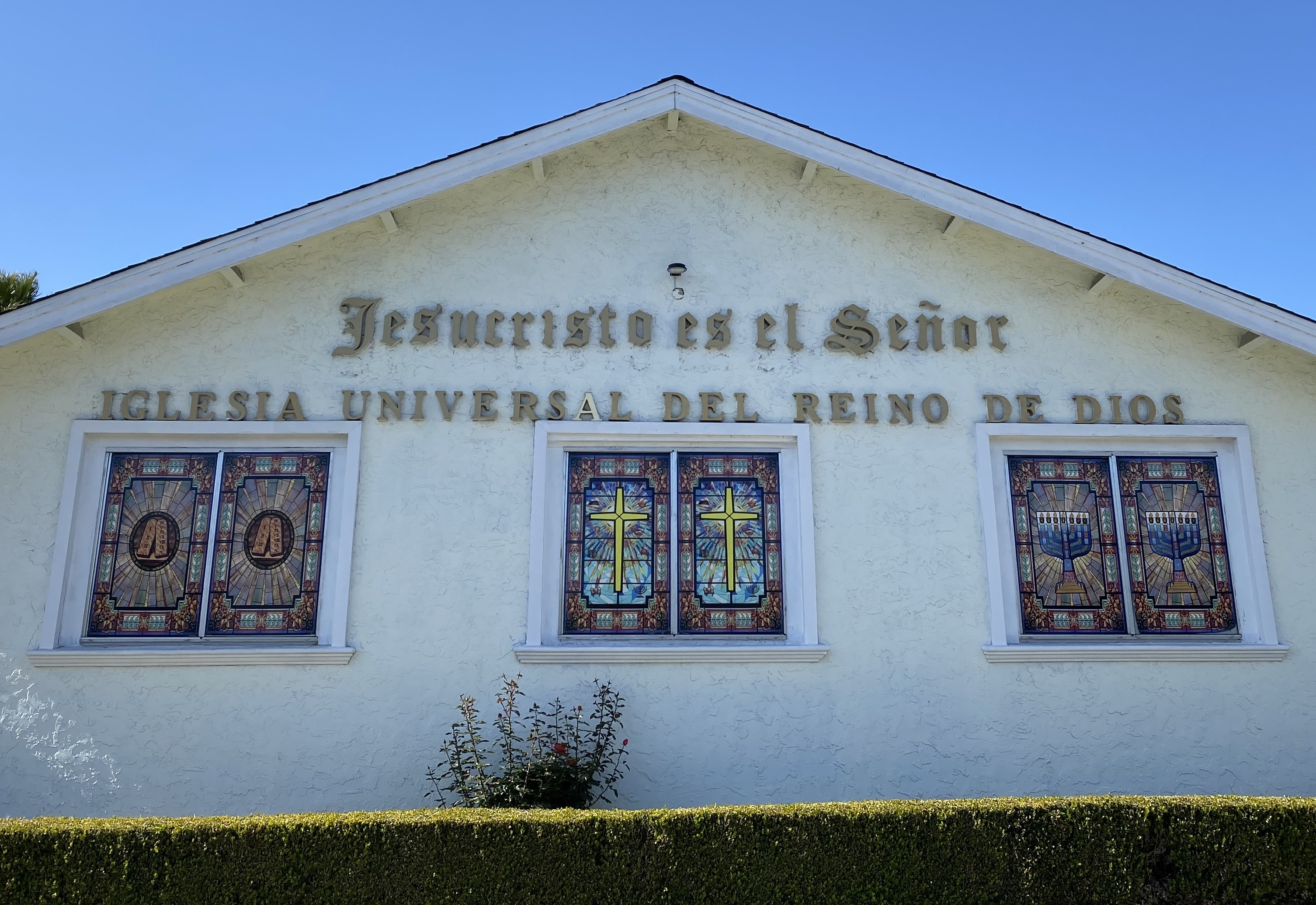
Iglesia Universal del Reino de Dios
