= Meadowfair, San Jose =

Neighborhood of San Jose, California, USA

Coordinates: 37.316787°N 121.820276°W

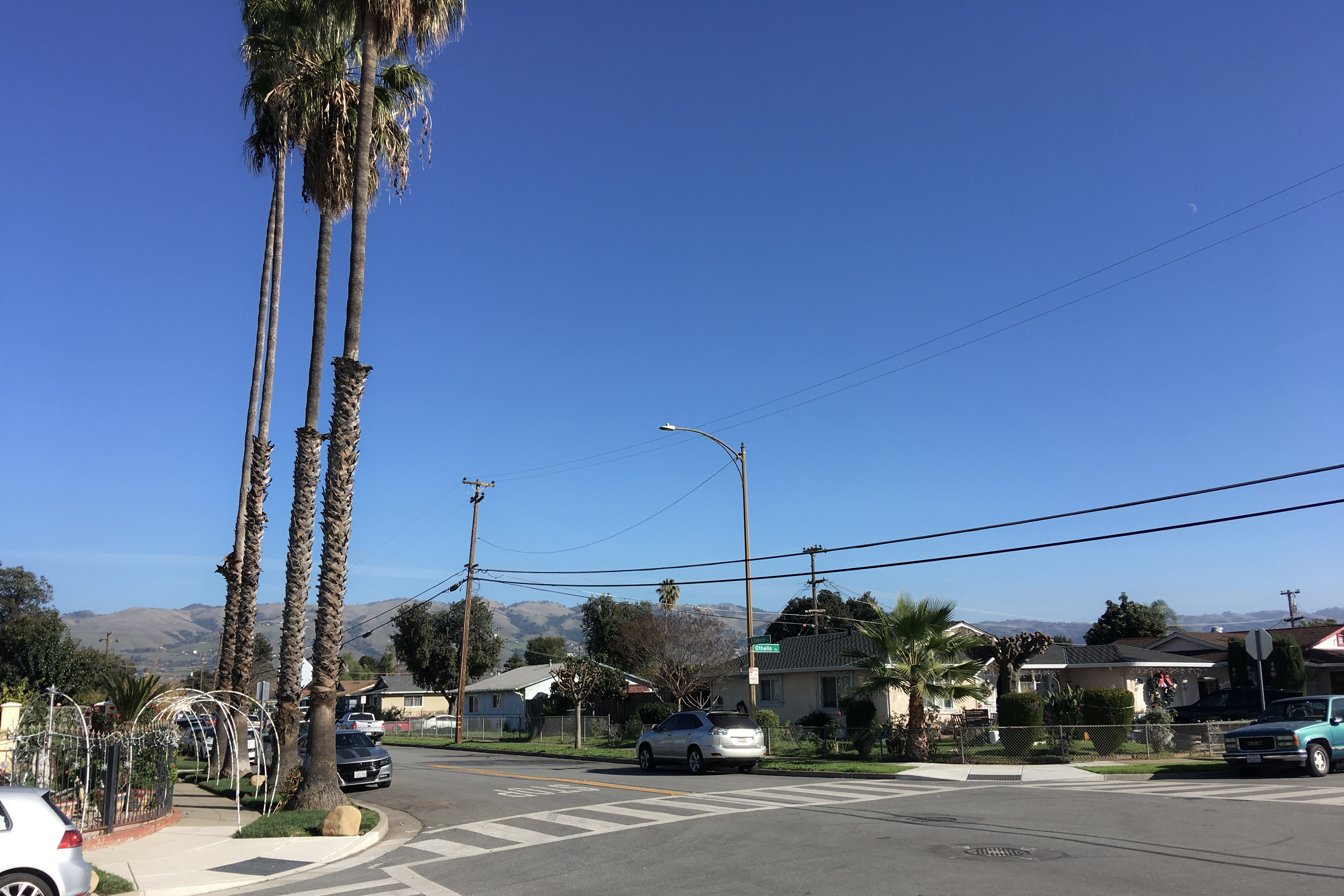
Meadowfair, San Jose, California, US

Meadowfair is a small neighborhood of San Jose, California, located in East San Jose. It is one Eastside San Jose's historic Chicano/Mexican-American neighborhoods.

== Geography ==
Meadowfair is in District 8 of San Jose and adjacent to Eastridge Mall; its other boundaries are Capitol Expressway and King Road.

Most of the neighborhood consists of a development of two-story houses, which is shaped like a piano and has street names with a musical theme. Meadowfair Park is located on part of one of the last remaining orchards in the area.
