= Our Lady of Guadalupe Church (San Jose, California) =

- Our Lady of Guadalupe Mission Chapel (1953-1960)
- U.S. National Register of Historic Places
- U.S. National Historic Landmark
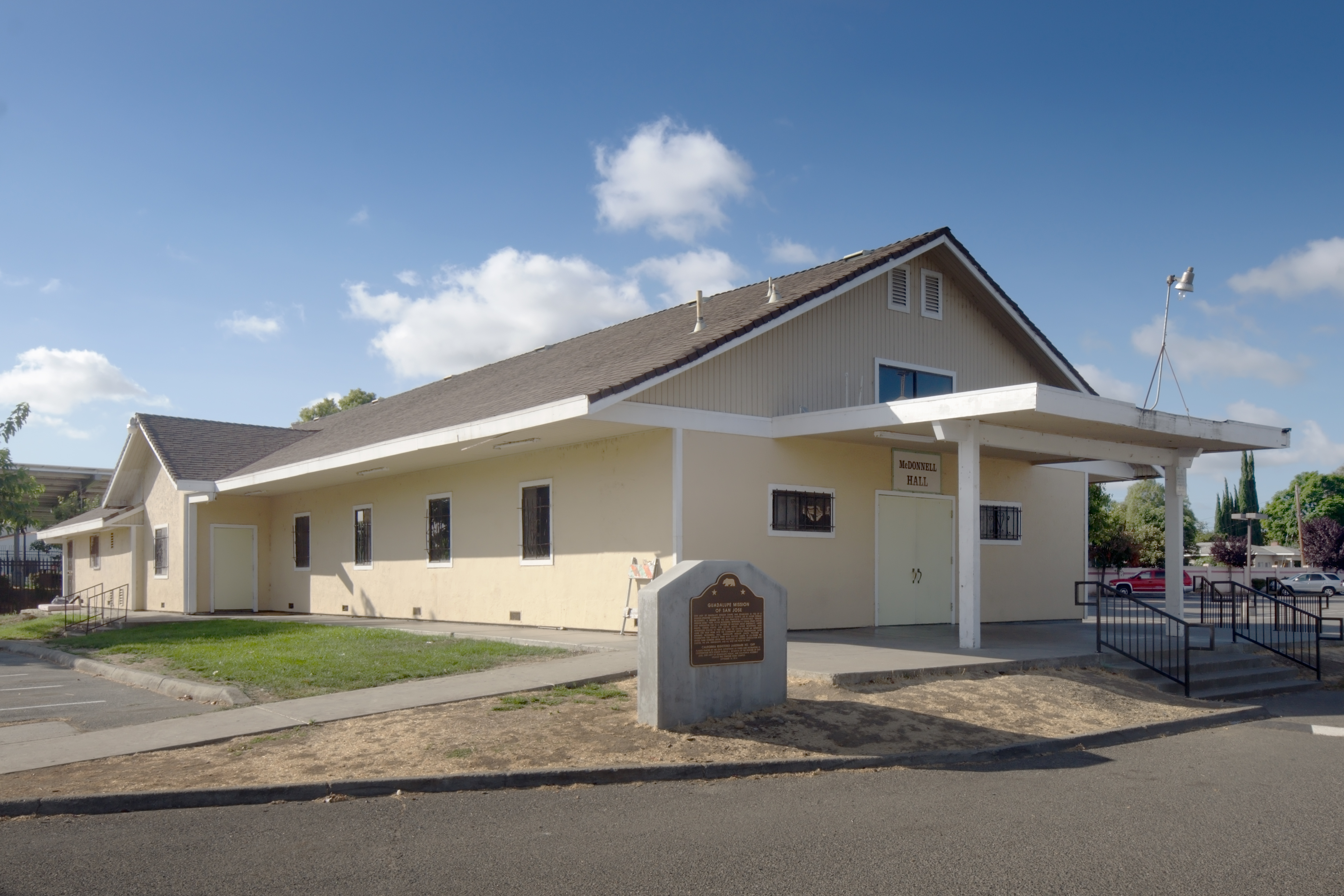
- McDonnell Hall

- Location within California Location within the United States
- Location: 2020 East San Antonio St., San Jose, California
- Coordinates: 37°21′09.2″N 121°50′40.7″W
- Area: less than one acre
- NRHP reference No.: 100000836

Significant dates
- Added to NRHP: December 23, 2016
- Designated NHL: December 23, 2016

Our Lady of Guadalupe Church is a Roman Catholic church in San Jose, California, located in the Mayfair neighborhood of East San Jose. It is historically important for its association with Californian civil rights activist César Chávez, who attended the church and conducted labor and community organizing activities out of the old church building, which now serves as the parish hall under the name McDonnell Hall. The building was designated a National Historic Landmark in 2016.

== Description and history ==
Our Lady of Guadalupe Church is located northeast of downtown San Jose in its Mayfair neighborhood, on the south side of East San Antonio Street east of its junction with South Sunset Avenue. The main church building is a six-sided modern structure, built in 1968. McDonnell Hall stands in the parking area on the east side of the church building. It is a basically rectangular single-story wood-frame structure, with a gabled roof and stucco exterior. The north-facing short facade houses its main entrance, sheltered by a gabled portico. The interior has been substantially altered for use from its original religious functions, to house meeting spaces, a kitchen, classrooms, and storage.

McDonnell Hall was built in 1914 to a design by San Jose architect Louis Lenzen, and was originally located in West San Jose, where it housed the congregation called St. Martin of Tours. In 1923, this congregation added wings to each side of the building, giving it a cruciform shape; it was again renovated in 1948. In 1953, the St. Martin's congregation sold the building to the Roman Catholic parish of St. Patrick's, which wanted to establish a mission in Mayfair to better serve the large Mexican and Mexican-American Catholic population that lived there. The building was broken down and reconstructed near its present location, and from 1953 to 1968 it housed the growing Our Lady of Guadalupe congregation. The building was formally upgraded from a chapel to a church in 1960. After construction of the modern church, the building was moved 450 feet (140 m) northwest, in order to accommodate the city's development of Mayfair Park. It was moved and deconsecrated in 1974–75.

The building is historically significant for its association with labor leader and civil rights activist César Chávez. Chávez, a Roman Catholic, was a friend of Father Donald McDonnell, the priest who first led Our Lady of Guadalupe, and helped in the relocation of the building and its reconsecration as a Roman Catholic chapel in 1953. The chapel became home to Chávez's chapter of the Community Service Organization, an important training ground for his later activism. Chávez moved from San Jose to Oxnard in 1958.

== See also ==
- List of National Historic Landmarks in California
- National Register of Historic Places listings in Santa Clara County, California
- List of monuments and memorials to Cesar Chavez
