= Mexican Heritage Plaza =

Cultural center in San Jose, California, US

- Centro Cultural de San José
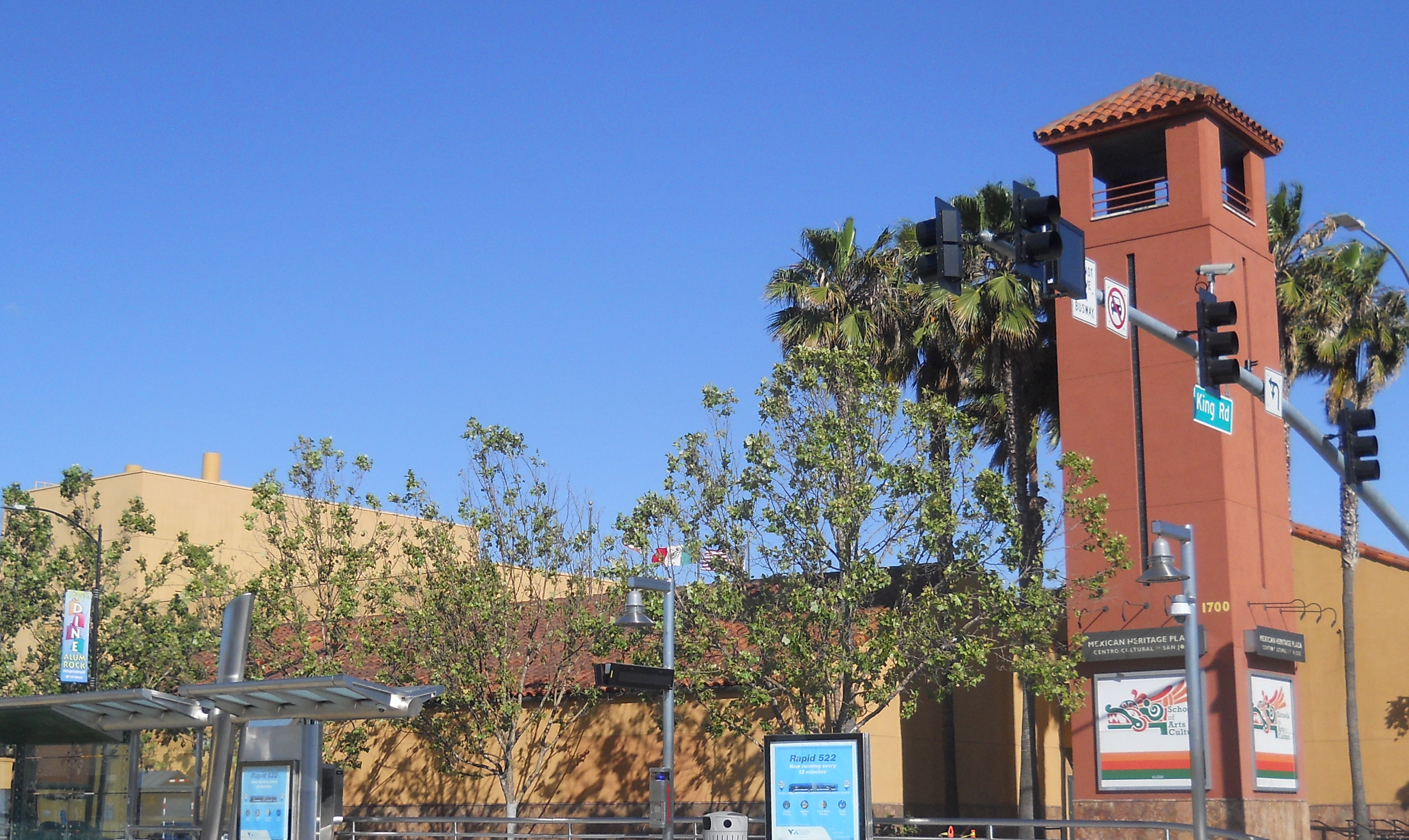
- Interactive map of Mexican Heritage Plaza
- Address: 1700 Alum Rock Avenue
- Location: San Jose, California
- Coordinates: 37.352748°N 121.853957°W
- Owner: City of San Jose
- Operator: School of Arts and Culture
- Capacity: Plaza: 1,020; Theater: 500

Construction
- Built: 1999

Website
- www.mhplaza.com

The Mexican Heritage Plaza - Centro Cultural de San José is a Chicano/Mexican-American cultural center in San Jose, California, located in the Mayfair neighborhood of East San Jose. It also hosts the School of Arts and Culture. It is a space where art and history come together hosting mariachi, ballet folklórico, and teatro campesino groups, as well as inviting speakers like Dolores Huerta to share with the community.

== History ==
Mexican Heritage Plaza opened in 1999 as a part of San Jose's "redevelopment" initiative headed by their Redevelopment Agency and was constructed to be a prominent cultural monument in San Jose. The building is in the Mayfair district of San Jose, a historically Mexican-American community as a result of "restrictive covenants" introduced during the 1920s. The cultural center was fully funded by the San Jose Redevelopment Agency and partially funded by the Mexican Heritage Corporation who had been advocating for the construction of the center since 1988.

The Mexican Heritage Corporation is a local foundation, created with the intention to fund art and cultural events for San Jose's Mexican residents. Their main project was the foundation and subsequent funding of the Mexican Heritage Plaza. This funding was reevaluated in 2007 as the Mexican Heritage Plaza underwent a financial reassessment. There was concerns from the community that the center was not being used as originally intended.

The center was created as a space for Chicano and recently arrives Mexican immigrants in San José to come together to celebrate Mexican arts and culture, something that was not emphasized in public school education at the time. The plans to construct the Mexican Heritage Plaza came after a long history of young people, particularly student, discontent with the lack of Chicano visibility in their universities and city public spaces during the late 1960s. Residents also spoke of the construction of the plaza hopefully as a place for families to go with their children as a community family-friendly space.

The Heritage Plaza however, received criticisms from the surrounding communities of East San Jose. Many neighbors in the early 2000s after its opening. East Side residents stated that they did not use the plaza on a regular basis and the project put a financial strain on its investors and the community. Further there have been a number of residents advising that the best way to move forward is to open up the center to the community, in other words, to make it a multicultural center rather than one only for the Mexican community in San Jose. This is an important intervention as San Jose, and particularly the East Side is culturally diverse, with both Mexican and Vietnamese communities having historical residence in the area. Others had suggested to turn the space into a "zocalo" in the city, while still others emphasized the need for an arts education center.

== Facilities ==
The plaza includes a 500-seat theater, gardens, classrooms, and meeting spaces.

== Art ==
The Corazón y Espíritu de Mayfair mural was painted in 2004 by Precita Eyes Muralists and planned by Susan Cervantes.

A series of mosaic tributes to Chicano and Mexican-American artists lines the northwestern entrance to the plaza. Tributes include guitarist Carlos Santana (Bay Area native), musical group Los Tigres del Norte (who began their recording career in San Jose), playwright Luis Valdez (who grew up in San Jose), and singer Linda Ronstadt (who serves as the honorary chair of the SJ Mexican Heritage Festival).

Teatro Campesino played a large role in the beginnings of the Mexican Heritage Plaza. The Plaza regularly hosts the theater troupe, Teatro Visión who have performed productions such as "El Vagon", "Bless Me, Ultima", and "Departera". Their ties to the Plaza began in 1999 at its opening with their performance of "Harvest Moon".

The Plaza also hosted an array of both visual and performing art including works by: José and Malaquías Montoya (two Chicano artists from New Mexico), Wosne Worke Kosrof (and Ethiopian) artist), and Martín Ramírez (a Mexican Artist).

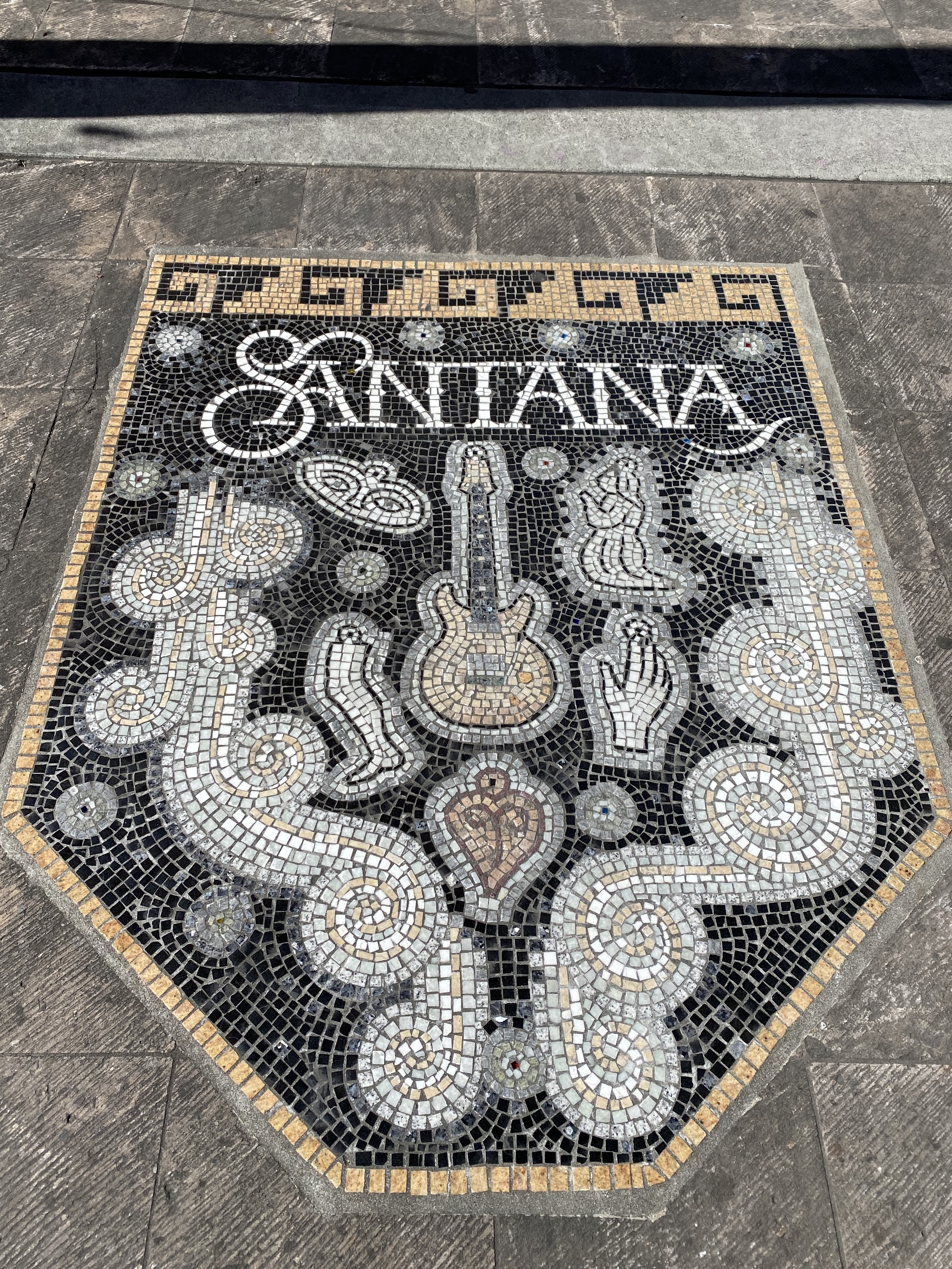
Tribute to Carlos Santana

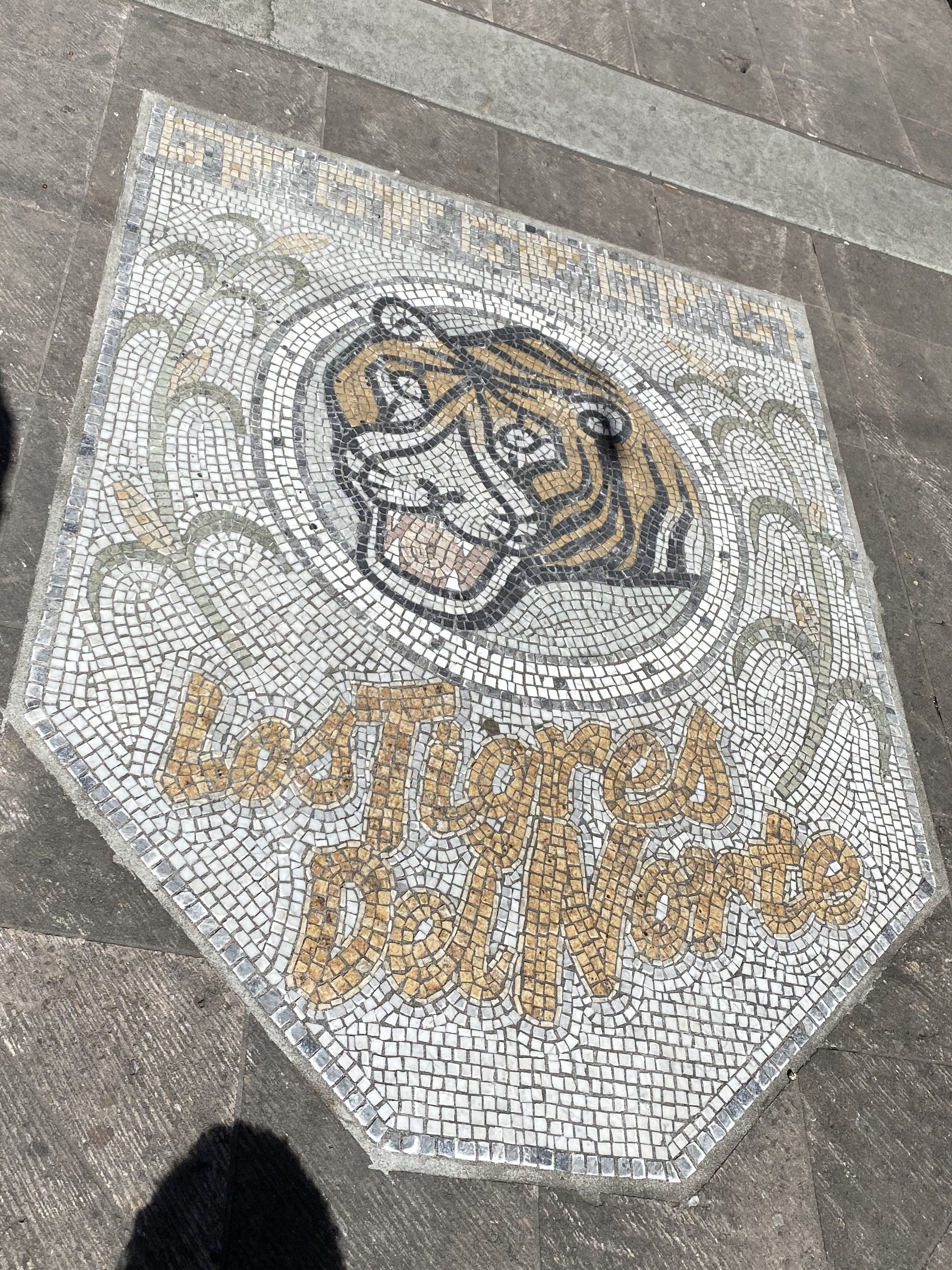
Tribute to Los Tigres del Norte

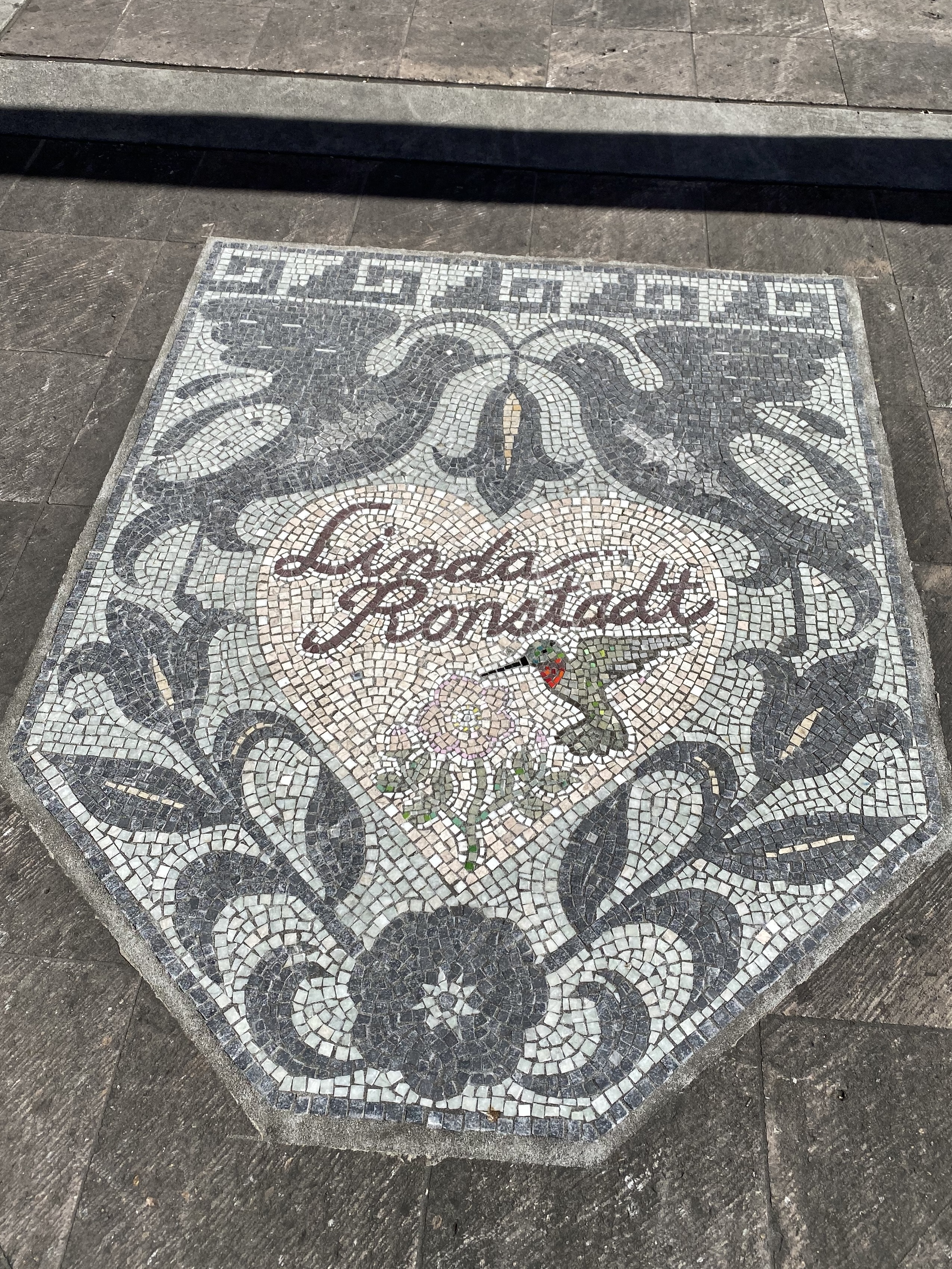
Tribute to Linda Ronstadt

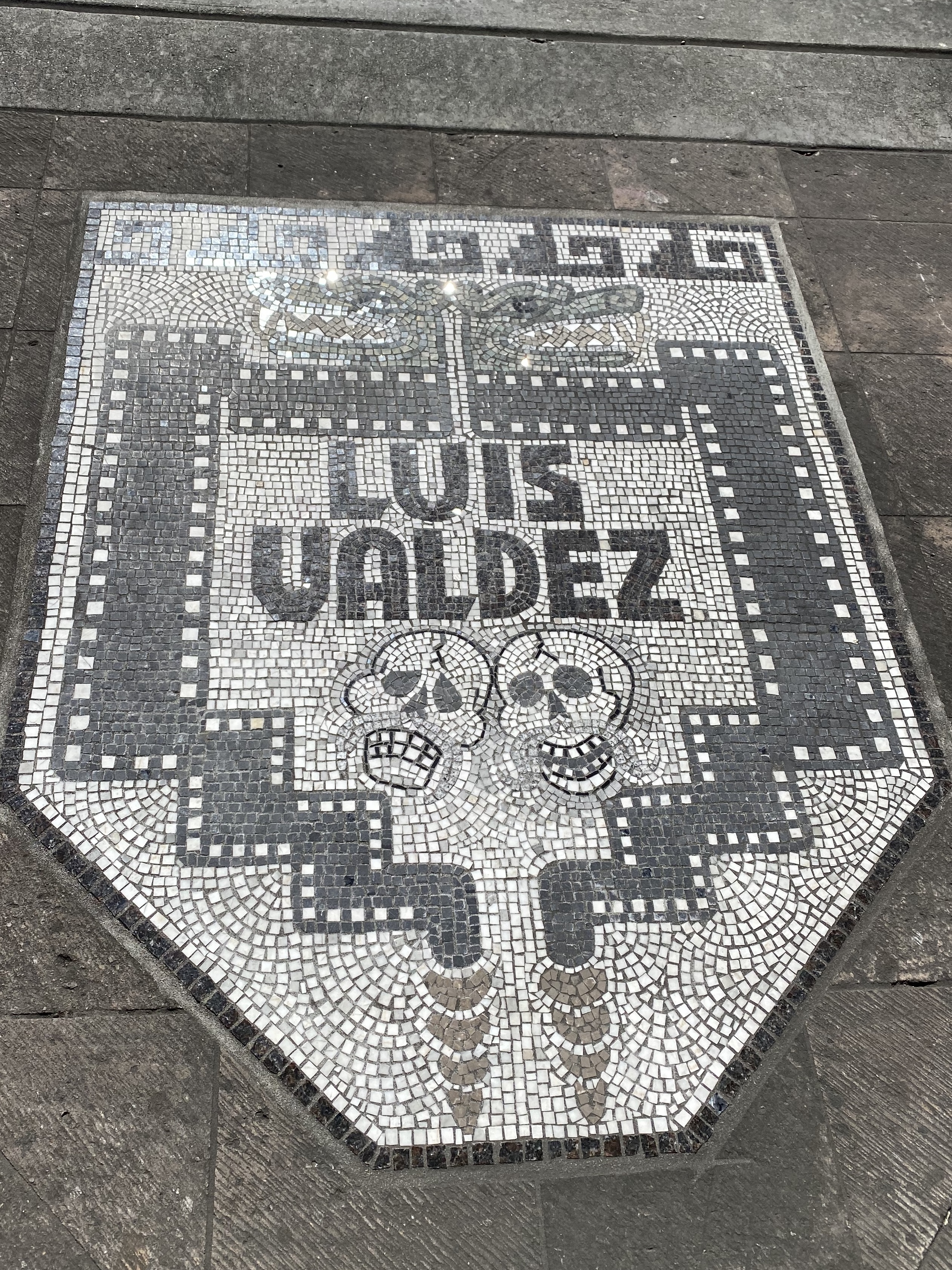
Tribute to Luis Valdez

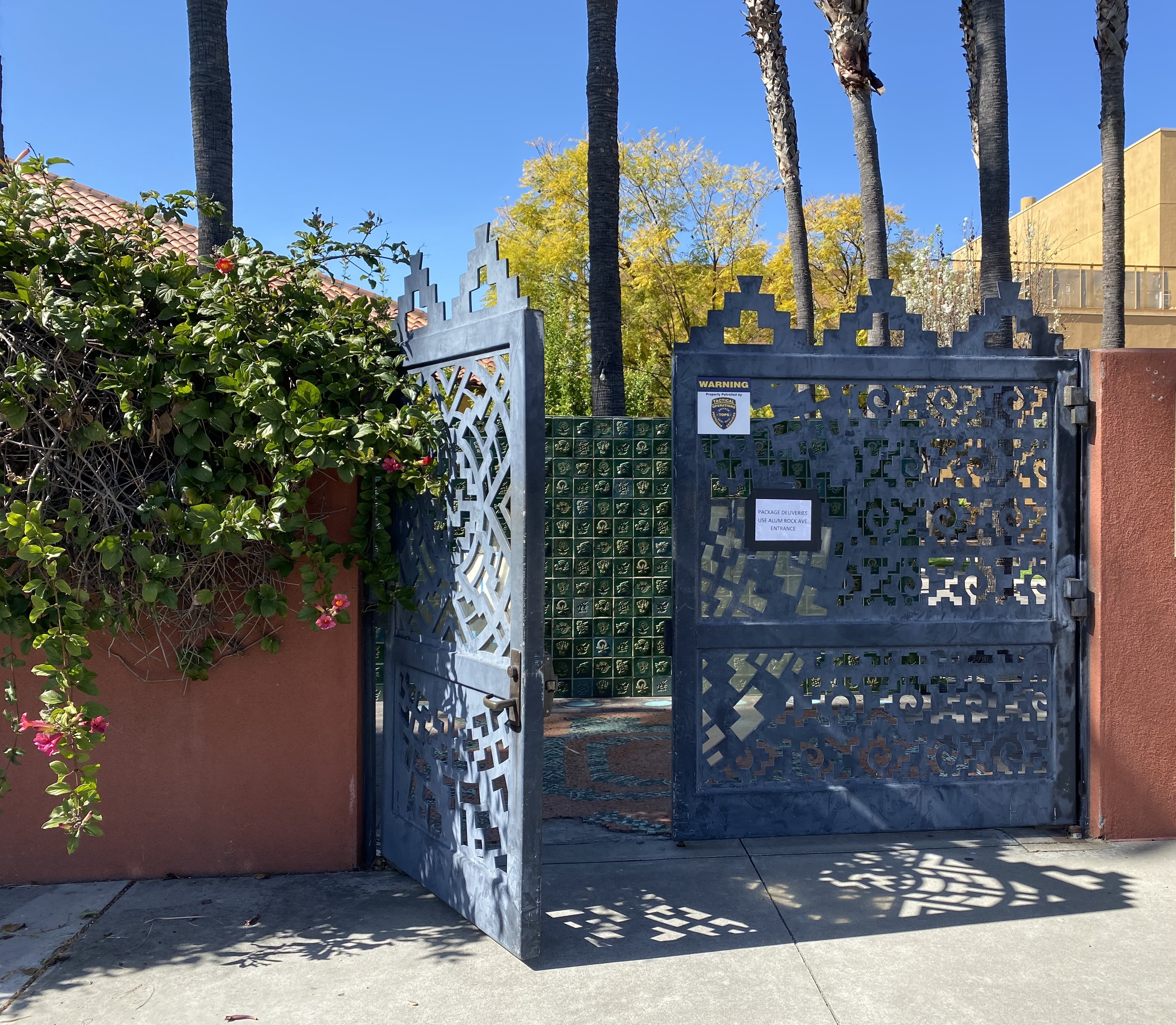
Aztec-inspired ironwork

== Book ==
"Mexican Heritage Plaza: A Symbol of Resilience and Perseverance" is a book written by author Eddie Garcia, a long time San Jose resident. The book was published in February 2026. He narrates the beginnings of the plaza and the people and civil actors involved in its creation.
