= East San Jose =

East San Jose The East Side
- Region of San Jose, California
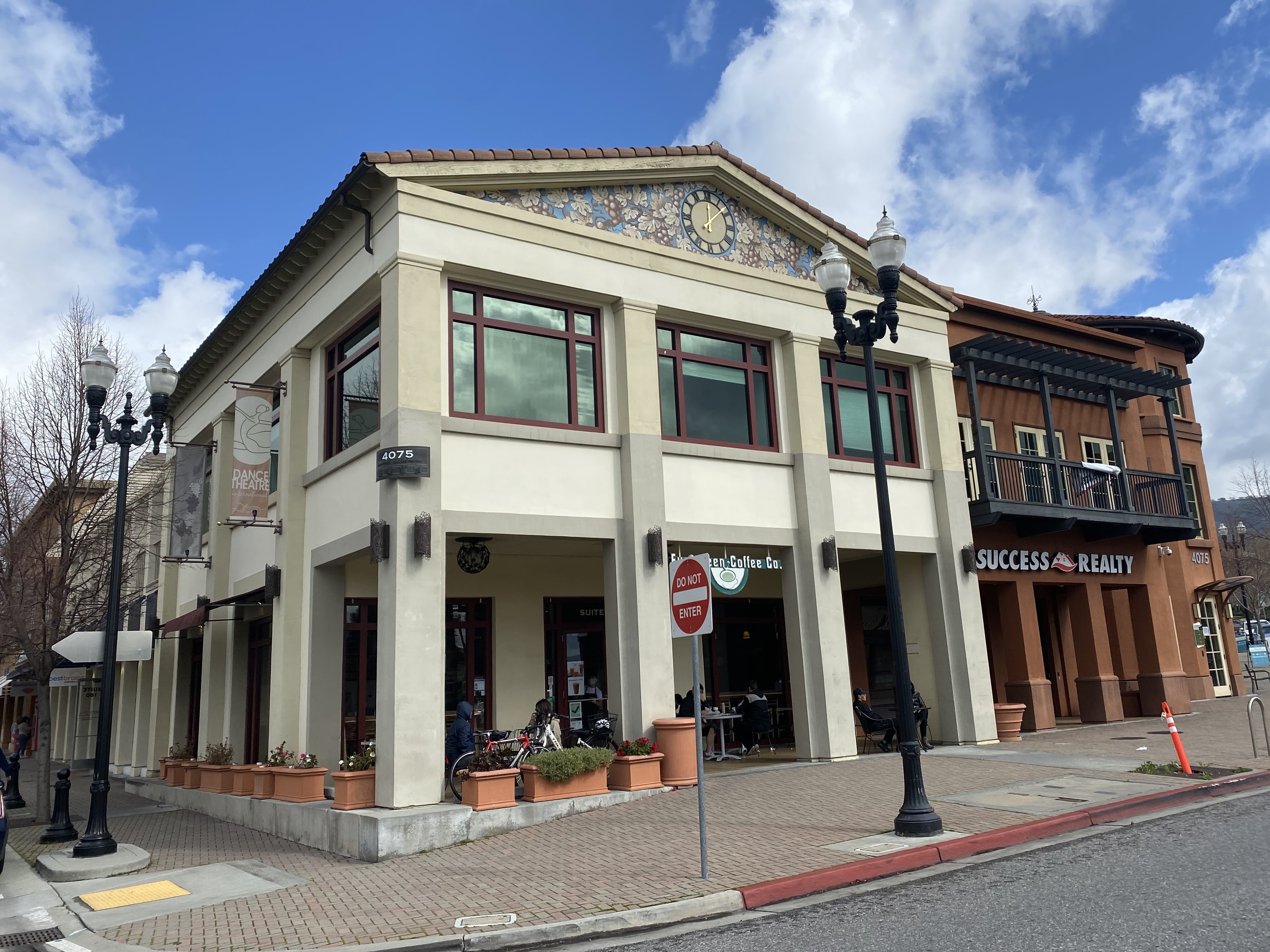
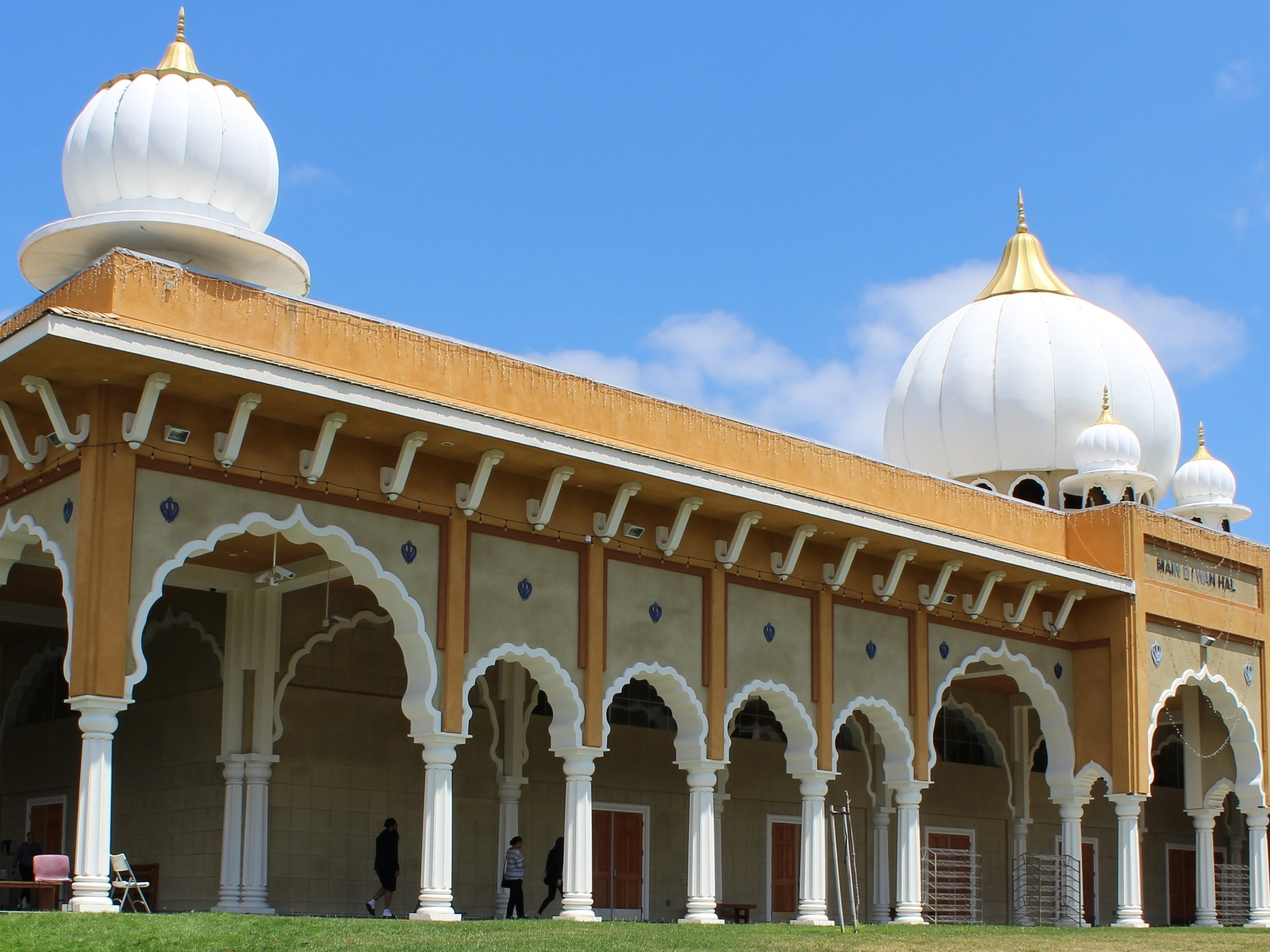
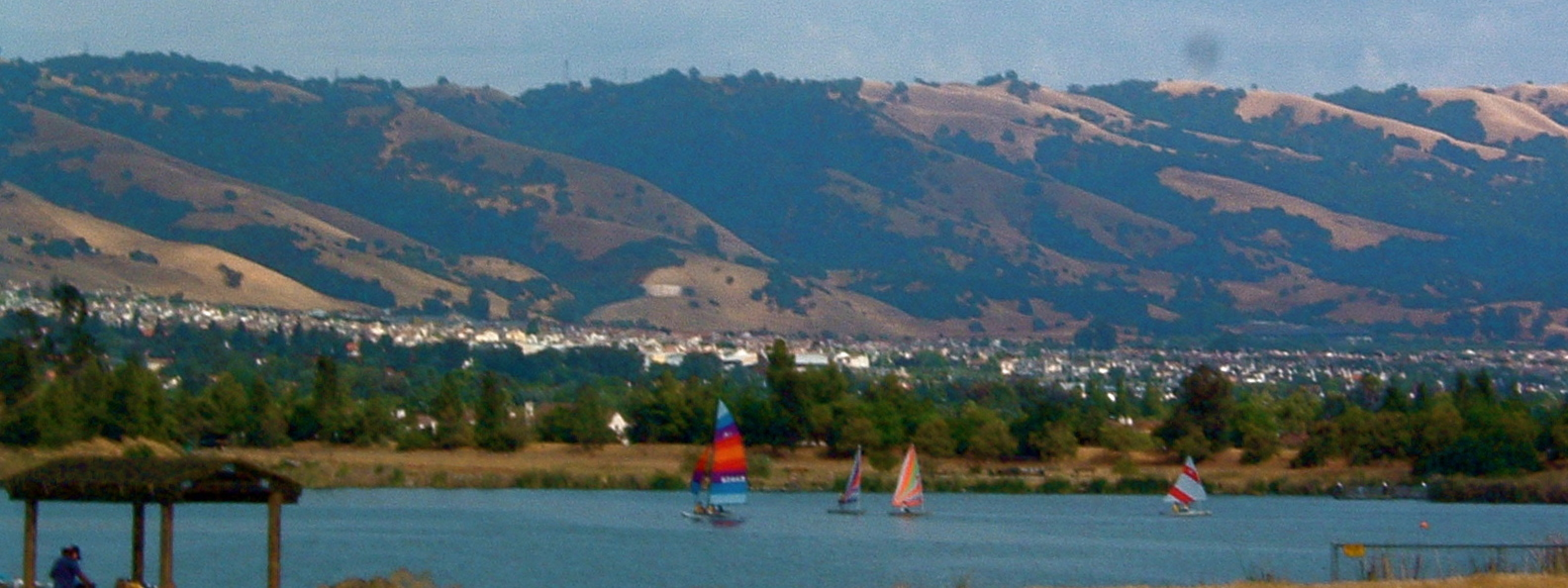
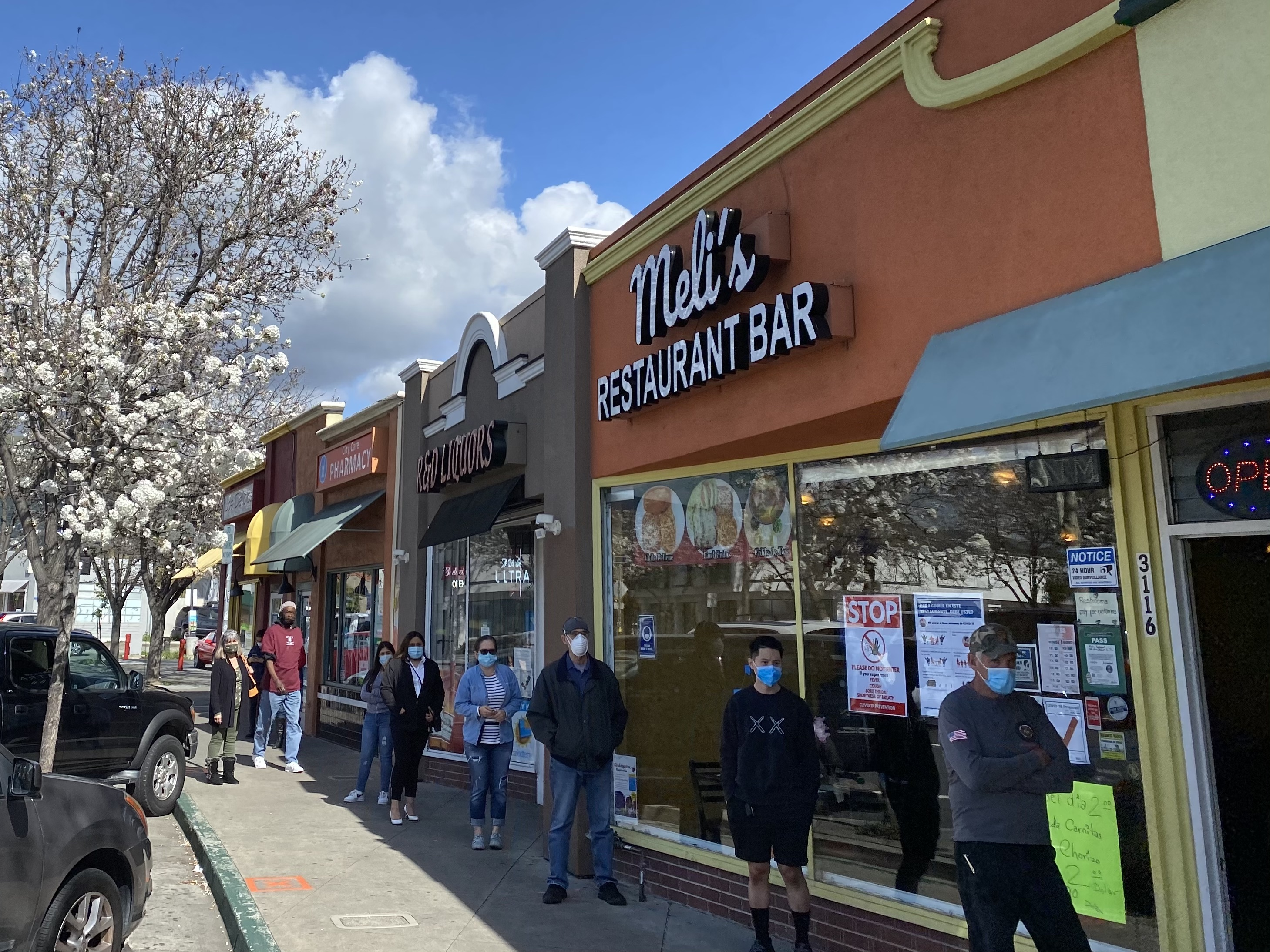
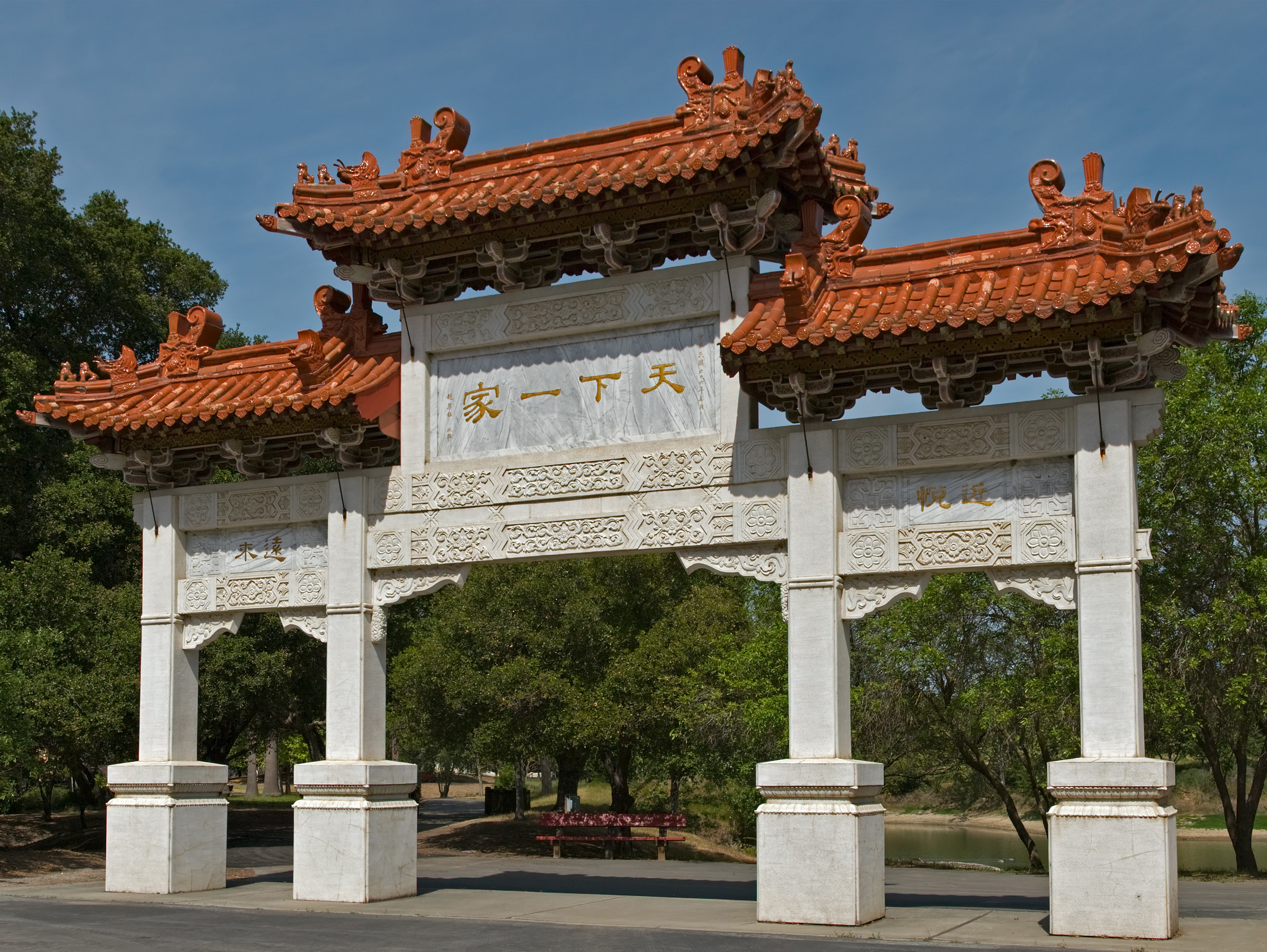
- Top: Evergreen Village Square, Gurdwara Sahib of San Jose; middle: Lake Cunningham; bottom: Alum Rock Village; Overfelt Gardens.

- Location within San Jose
- Coordinates: 37.329423°N 121.815689°W
- Country: United States
- State: California
- County: Santa Clara
- City: San Jose

East Side San Jose (abbreviated as ESSJ), commonly called The East Side and less commonly as the East Valley, is the eastern region of the city of San Jose, California. The East Side is made up of numerous neighborhoods grouped into two larger districts: Alum Rock and Evergreen. East San Jose is bordered by the Diablo Range to the east and south, the Coyote Creek to the west, and Mabury Road to the North.

East San Jose is one of the city's most diverse regions, home to landmarks such as the historic Chicano/Mexican-American neighborhoods of Mayfair and King & Story, as well as the Gurdwara Sahib of San Jose, the largest Sikh temple in the world outside of India.

== History ==
East San Jose originally referred to a small former city that sat to the east of San Jose, which was annexed by the City of San Jose in 1911. That area now falls within Central San Jose.

The Alum Rock neighborhood of Mayfair is famed for its historical association with Californian civil rights activist César Chávez, who lived in the neighborhood in the 1950s and began his career as a grassroots activist at Our Lady of Guadalupe Church in Mayfair.

Evergreen is the site of flight experiments conducted in 1911 by John J. Montgomery, who is best known for his invention of controlled heavier-than-air flying machines.

== Districts and neighborhoods ==
East San Jose is divided into two districts, Alum Rock and Evergreen, which are then each divided into individual neighborhoods.

- District of Alum Rock
  - Little Portugal
  - Little Saigon
  - Mayfair
  - Naglee Park
  - King & Story
  - East Foothills
- District of Evergreen
  - Silver Creek Valley
  - Meadowfair

== Landmarks ==
- Eastridge Center
- Lake Cunningham/Raging Waters San Jose
- Mexican Heritage Plaza
- Reid-Hillview Airport
- East San José Carnegie Branch Library
- Lion Plaza

== See also ==
- North San Jose
- West San Jose
- South San Jose
