= Rancho Los Huecos =

Mexican land grant in California

Coordinates: 37.290°N 121.620°W

Rancho Los Huecos was a 39,951-acre (161.68 km^{2}) Mexican land grant in present-day Santa Clara County, California, given in 1846 by Governor Pio Pico to Luis Arenas and John A. Rowland. The grant extended along the San Felipe Valley between present day Gilroy and Hollister at the foot of the Diablo Range. The grant lay to the southwest of Isabel Creek.

== History ==
Luis Arenas came to California in 1834, and was the grantee of Rancho El Susa in 1841. Luis Arenas son, Cayetano Arenas, was secretary to Governor Pio Pico. J. L. Hornsby acquired Arenas interest in the grant. Rowland, usually referred to as "John Roland" in the land grant records, was a grantee of Rancho La Puente. He sold his shares to Naglee, McDermott and Patterson.

The grant was a nine square league sobrante (surplus land remaining) from Rancho Cañada de San Felipe y Las Animas made in 1839, and Rancho Cañada de Pala made in 1839. When Rowland and Arenas petitioned for the grant, they did not provide a map of the land solicited, but offered to furnish a map to the governor at a convenient time—that is, whenever there might be occasion for its use. No map was ever produced.

With the cession of California to the United States following the Mexican-American War, the 1848 Treaty of Guadalupe Hidalgo provided that the land grants would be honored. As required by the Land Act of 1851, a claim for was Rancho Los Huecos filed with the Public Land Commission in 1852, but rejected by the Commission in 1854, on the grounds that original grant documents did not include a map. On appeal to the US Supreme Court, the grant was patented to John Rowland and J. L. Hornsby in 1876.
