= Coyote Creek (Santa Clara County) =

Creek in California, United States

Coyote Creek Spanish: Arroyo Coyote
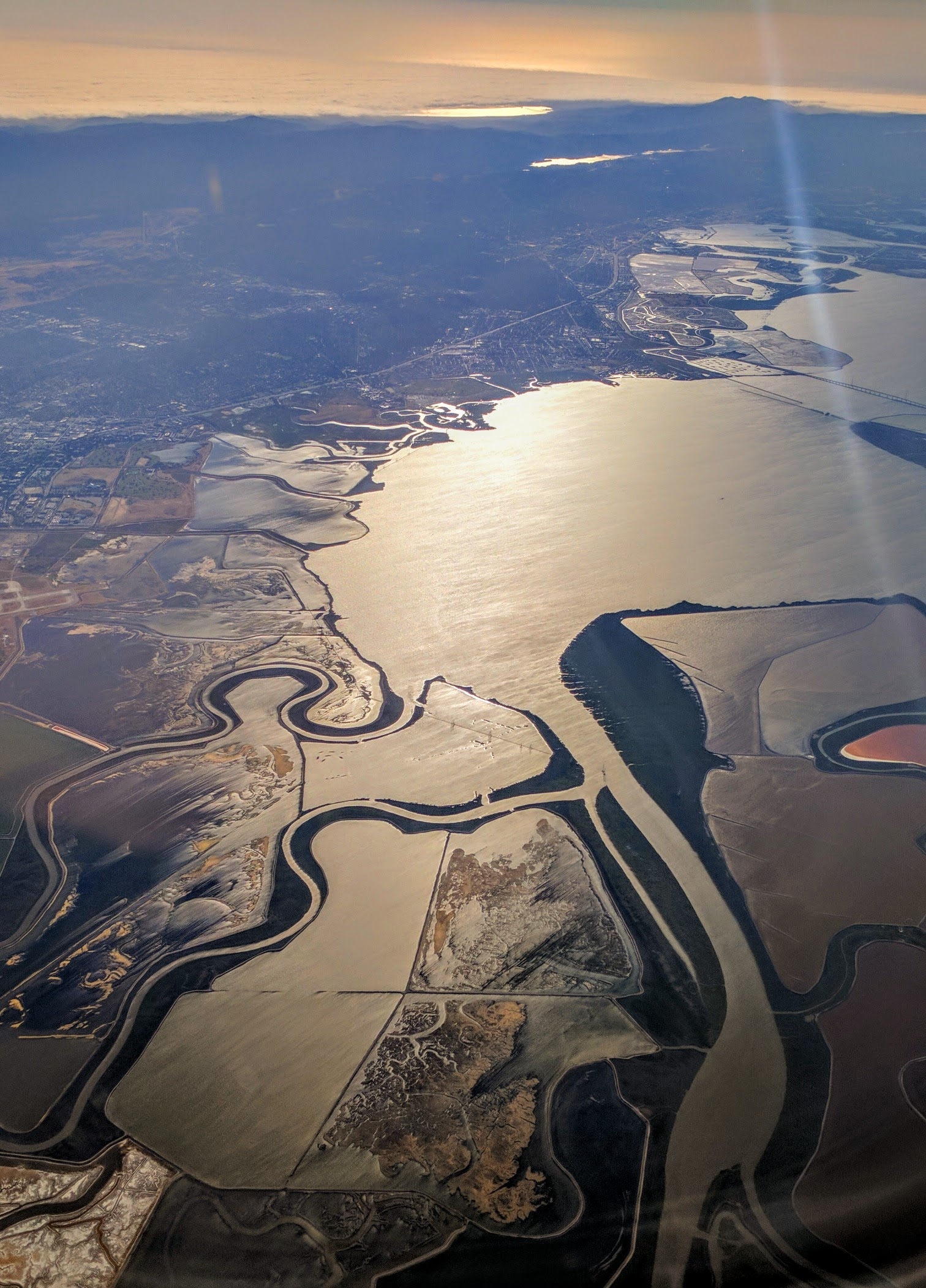
- Coyote Creek (lower right) where it flows into the San Francisco Bay

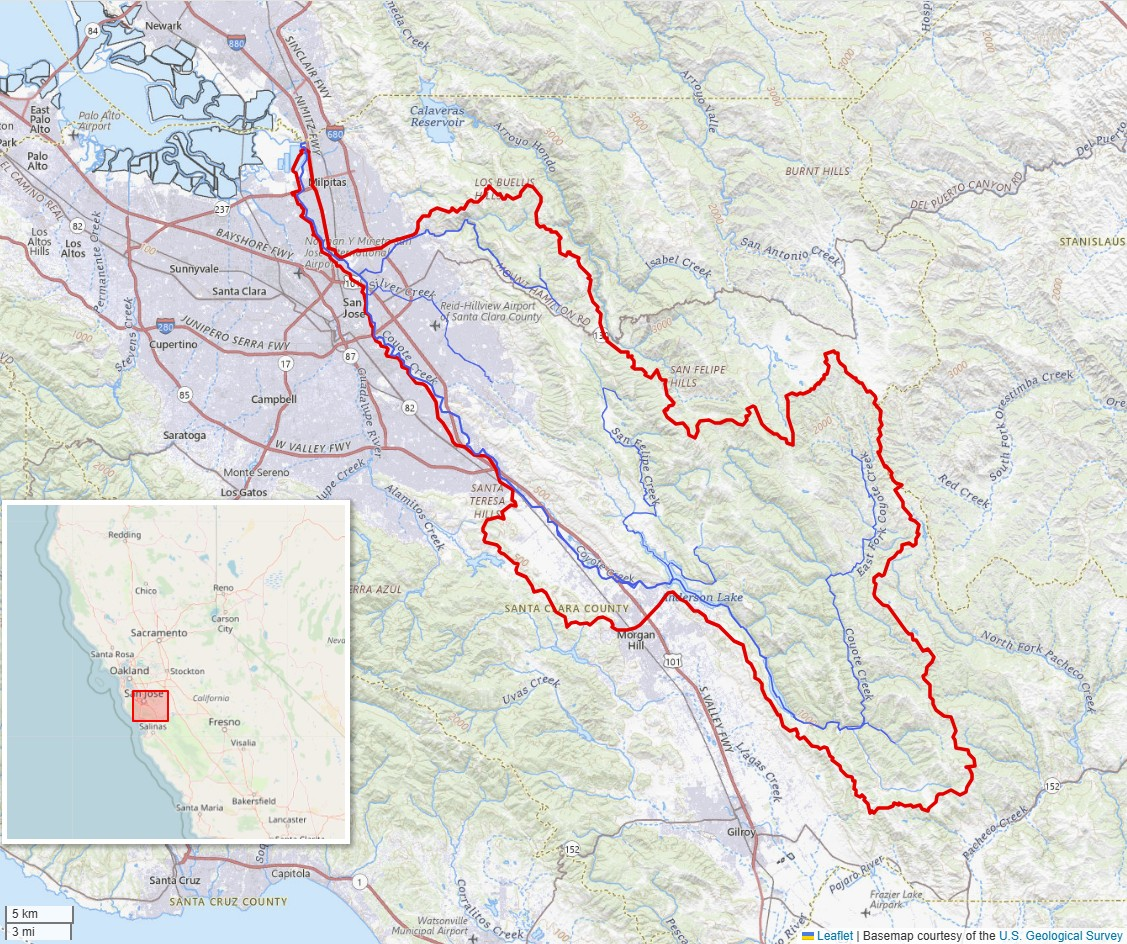
- Coyote Creek watershed (Interactive map)
- Native name: Máyyan Rúmmey (Northern Ohlone)

Location
- Country: United States
- State: California
- Region: Santa Clara County, Alameda County
- City: San Jose, California

Physical characteristics
- Source: East Fork Coyote Creek
  - location: 14 mi (20 km) northeast of Morgan Hill
  - coordinates: 37°19′0″N 121°29′47″W
  - elevation: 2,630 ft (800 m)
- 2nd source: Middle Fork Coyote Creek
  - coordinates: 37°16′53″N 121°33′40″W
  - elevation: 3,400 ft (1,000 m)
- Source confluence: Confluence of Middle and East Forks
  - location: Henry W. Coe State Park
  - coordinates: 37°10′24″N 121°29′42″W
  - elevation: 1,171 ft (357 m)
- Mouth: South San Francisco Bay near Calaveras Point
  - location: 8 mi (13 km) west of Milpitas, California
  - coordinates: 37°27′26″N 122°2′56″W
  - elevation: 0 ft (0 m)
- Length: 63.6 mi (102.4 km)confluence to mouth

Basin features
- Tributaries
  - left: Fisher Creek
  - right: San Felipe Creek, Upper Silver Creek, Lower Silver Creek, Upper and Lower Penitencia Creeks

Coyote Creek (Spanish: Arroyo Coyote) is a river that flows through the Santa Clara Valley in Northern California. Its source is on Mount Sizer, in the mountains east of Morgan Hill. It eventually flows into Anderson Lake in Morgan Hill and then northwards through Coyote Valley to San Jose, where it empties into the San Francisco Bay.

== History ==
Coyote Creek was originally named Arroyo del Coyote by Padre Pedro Font when the de Anza Expedition reached it on Sunday, March 31, 1776. However, modern Spanish usage is simply Arroyo Coyote.

== Watershed ==
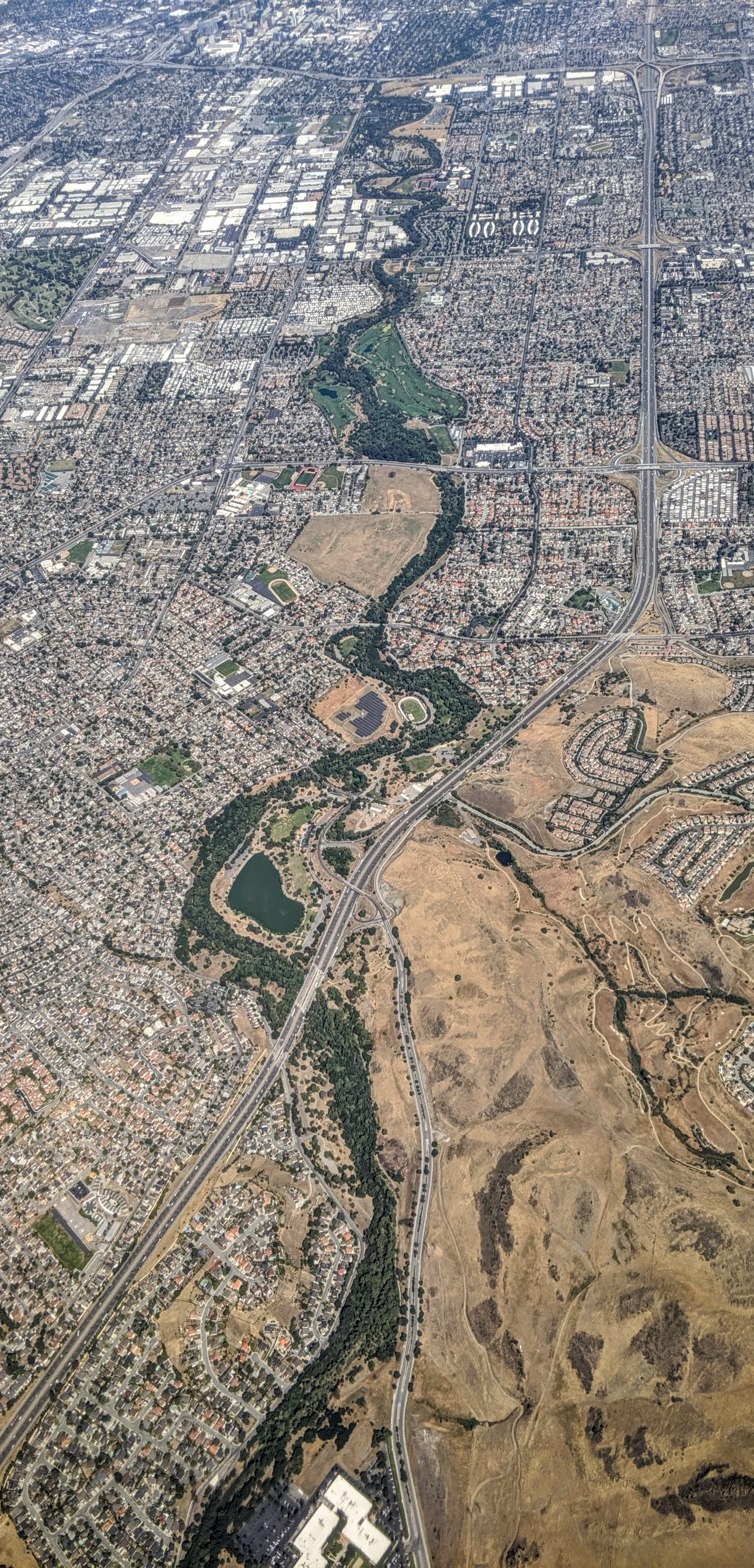
Coyote Creek aerial view from the south in San Jose, from south of Hellyer County Park up to Interstate 280

Although it is called a "creek", Coyote Creek is actually a river whose watershed drains 320 square miles (830 km^{2}). The Coyote Creek mainstem runs 63.6 miles (102.4 km) from the confluence of its East Fork and Middle Fork to the southeast San Francisco Bay. The river's main source is on Mount Sizer near Henry W. Coe State Park and the surrounding hills in the Diablo Range, northeast of Morgan Hill, California. At the base of the Diablo Range, the creek is impounded by two dams, first Coyote Reservoir and then Anderson Lake. Nine major tributaries lie within the area that drains to these two reservoirs: Cañada de los Osos, Hunting Hollow, Dexter Canyon, and Larios Canyon Creeks drain to Coyote Reservoir; Otis Canyon, Packwood, San Felipe, Las Animas, and Shingle Valley Creeks drain to Anderson Lake. Coyote Reservoir Dam was built across the active 1000-ft wide trace of the Calaveras fault by the Santa Clara Valley Water District (SCVWD) between 1934 and 1936, storing 10,000 acre-feet (12,000,000 m^{3}) of water.

From Anderson Lake, Coyote Creek continues northwards from Morgan Hill through Coyote Valley, the narrowest point between the Diablo Range and the coastal Santa Cruz Mountains, where it picks up Fisher Creek before entering San Jose. As Coyote Creek forms the eastern boundary of downtown San Jose, it winds its way into North San Jose. There, Upper Silver Creek was diverted to Coyote Creek south of Singleton Road. Further downstream Lower Silver Creek (including its sub-tributaries Miguelita Creek and Thompson Creek), Penitencia Creek, and Berryessa Creek are all tributaries. Coyote Creek then bypasses the Newby Island landfill and empties into the San Francisco Bay.

There is a chain of parks along Coyote Creek called the Coyote Creek Park Chain, which contains the Coyote Creek Trail. The feasibility of a trail connecting the parks within this chain to Almaden Park was first examined in 1989.

The river is managed by the SCVWD. In 1983, torrential rains caused by el Niño resulted in significant flooding of Coyote Creek in the Alviso neighborhood. The SCVWD, with advice from Santa Clara Basin Watershed Management Initiative (WMI) stakeholders, produced a stream stewardship plan for the Coyote Creek watershed in 2002. The plan includes over sixty projects to benefit flood protection, habitat enhancement, parks, and trails.

The Silver Creek Fault runs generally parallel to Coyote Creek.

== Risk of Anderson Dam failure from earthquakes ==
Updated findings from an ongoing study of Anderson Dam were released in October, 2010, indicated that the dam could fail if a magnitude 7.25 earthquake occurred within 2 kilometers of the dam, potentially releasing a wall of water 35 feet (11 m) high into downtown Morgan Hill in 14 minutes, and 8 feet (2.4 m) deep into San Jose within three hours. In response SCVWD has lowered the water to 54 percent full, which is 60 feet (18 m) below the dam crest. According to the SCVWD, remediation of the problem will likely require lengthy construction that would take up to six years and cost as much as $100 million.

Because Coyote Reservoir Dam was built right across the Calaveras fault and there is a substantial risk of a seismic-triggered landslide on the east side of the reservoir at the dam site, an earthquake could cause failure of this dam upstream of the Anderson Dam, and the release of water could increase risk of failure of the Anderson Dam.

On February 24, 2020, the Federal Energy Regulatory Commission ordered that Anderson Lake should be drained due to earthquake risk. It was drained to 3% capacity by the end of the year, increasing the city's reliance on imported water. The dam is to be entirely rebuilt, a process expected to take about a decade.

== 2017 Coyote Creek flood ==
After unusually heavy rainfalls, on February 20 and 21, 2017, the Anderson Reservoir reached as high as 104 percent of capacity, creating a large flow over the spillway into Coyote Creek, which overflowed and flooded neighborhoods of San Jose along US Highway 101 between the reservoir and the south San Francisco Bay.

The 2017 flood was the worst one since 1997. By 4 p.m. February 20, 2017, San Jose City opened an overnight shelter for residents who chose to voluntarily evacuate their homes in low-lying areas along Coyote Creek. Subsequent days, the city started issuing mandatory and advisory evacuation areas. On February 21, 2017, five people were rescued from the Coyote Creek floodwaters at Los Lagos Golf Course. The flood on that day forced the closure of US 101 in Morgan Hill. Twenty-eight horses were stranded at Cooksy Family Stables in South San Jose and at nearby Happy Hollow Park & Zoo in San Jose. Nearly 500 homes were evacuated at Senter Road and Phelan Avenue. The entire William Street park was flooded. A parking garage at San Jose International Airport was also flooded. About 14,000 people were forced out of their homes as a result of the flood. By February 23, 2017, nearly 4,000 people were still placed under evacuation orders. The creek reached a record height of 14.4 feet (4.4 m).

In the weeks following the flood, citizen anger and anguish about the emergency response to the flood led to disagreements between the City of San Jose and the SCVWD. At a hearing at City Hall on March 9, 2017, the City took some responsibility for giving late evacuation notices to residents but also blamed the water district for giving them flawed information. For example, although the district had estimated that the flows would have to exceed 7400 cubic feet per second (209.6 m^{3} per second) for flooding to occur, flows peaked only slightly higher, at 7428 cubic feet per second (210.3 m^{3} per second), and only well after flooding had already commenced; flooding had commenced at less than two thirds of the district's stated capacity. Later in the month, the two parties disagreed about whose responsibility it is to maintain and repair the creek. As of March 2017, the damage from the flood is estimated to cost more than $100 million to repair.

== Habitat and wildlife ==
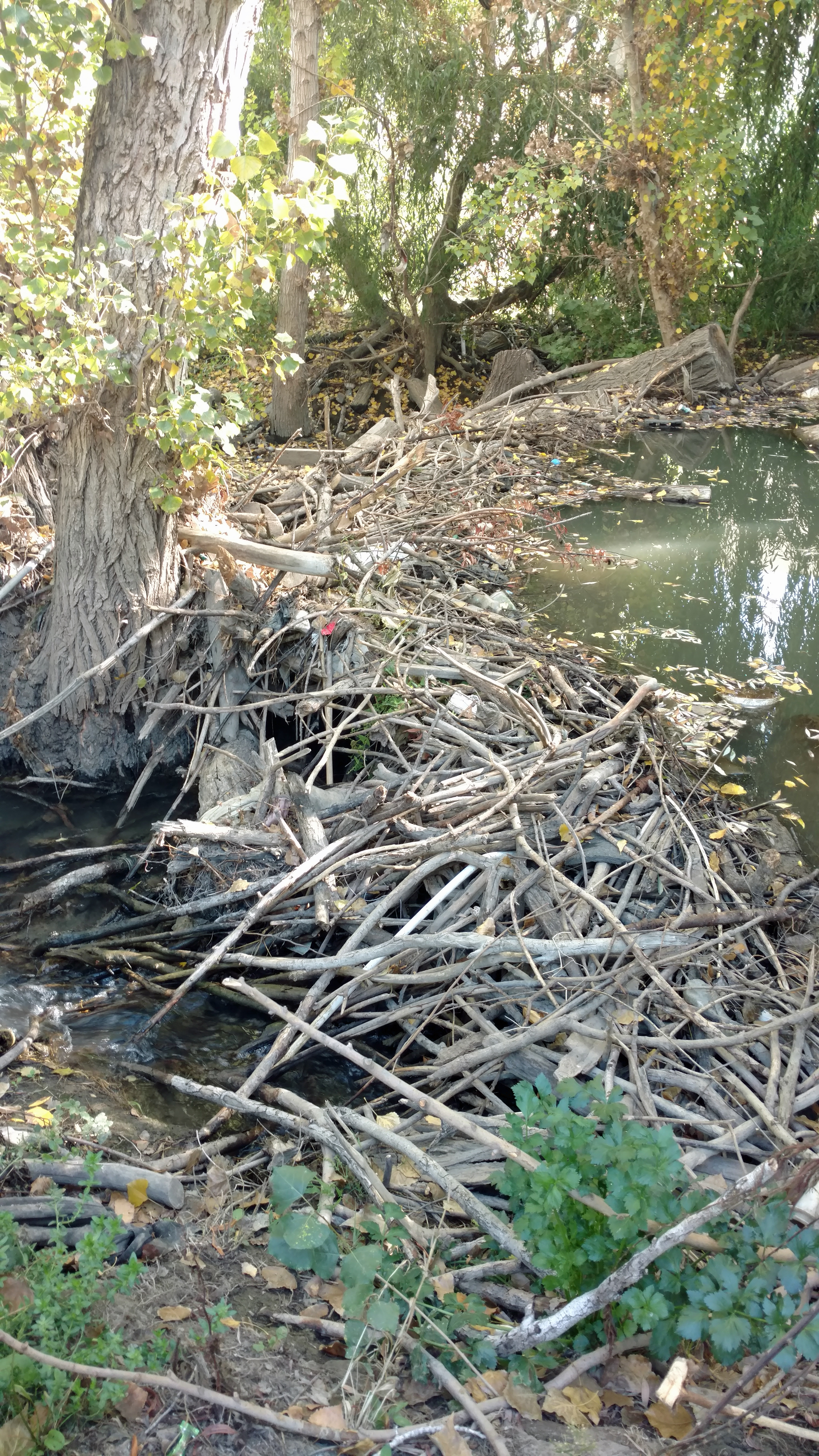
Beaver dam on Coyote Creek in San Jose November, 2018, Courtesy South Bay Clean Creeks Coalition.

Coyote Creek has historically, and still does support the most diverse fish fauna among the Santa Clara Valley Basin watersheds. It supports 10 to 11 native fish species out of the original 18. Species known to occur currently include Pacific lamprey (Lampetra tridentata), steelhead/resident rainbow trout (Oncorhynchus mykiss), Chinook salmon (Oncorhynchus tshawytscha), California roach, Hitch (Lavinia exilicauda), Sacramento blackfish (Orthodon microlepidotus), Sacramento pikeminnow, Sacramento sucker, three-spined stickleback, prickly sculpin (Cottus asper), riffle sculpin (Cottus gulosus), staghorn sculpin, and tule perch (Hysterocarpus traskii). Three species, the thicktail chub, splittail, and Sacramento perch have been extirpated from the drainage; the thicktail chub is extinct.

1962 report indicated that Coyote Creek, from its mouth to the headwaters in Henry Coe State Park, was an historical migration route for steelhead trout. SCVWD studies have shown that Standish Dam and percolation ponds have posed barriers to outmigrating trout. Based on these results, the seasonal Standish Dam barrier has not been installed since 2000. The on-channel percolation ponds constructed on Coyote Creek severely degrade steelhead habitat by harboring non-native fish predators, such as largemouth bass (Micropterus salmoides) which prey on salmonid fingerlings, and also by releasing warm water flows. Moving Ogier Ponds and Metcalf Percolation Ponds off-channel would significantly enhance rearing habitat for steelhead.

The Chinook salmon run in Coyote Creek may be the most viable for restoration in the South Bay, since the breeding salmon in the Guadalupe River declined subsequent to installation of extensive concrete channels in the river in downtown San Jose, California by the SCVWD. These are "fall run" fish primarily adapted to the Sacramento and San Joaquin River watersheds. Since Chinook salmon spawn in early winter and juveniles migrate to the ocean in their first spring, they are able to use habitats that turn very warm or have low water quality in summer. In 2012, the Santa Clara Valley Habitat Plan reported that Chinook salmon currently spawn in Coyote Creek as well as the Guadalupe River and its tributaries.

Coho salmon (Oncorhynchus kisutch) were present in the Coyote Creek watershed until the 1950s, suggesting that some spawning and rearing habitat was located in the watershed downstream from Coyote Reservoir which was completed in 1936—blocking access to 120 square miles (310 km^{2}) of upstream watershed. Historically, suitable habitat for coho salmon in the Coyote Creek watershed was likely restricted to the San Felipe Creek and Upper Penitencia Creek watersheds and possibly perennial reaches of Coyote Creek, and a few spring-fed tributaries upstream from Gilroy Hot Springs. Assuming the Coyote Percolation Reservoir was not a complete barrier to coho salmon; the construction of Anderson Dam in 1950 would have eliminated any coho salmon that occurred in the San Felipe Creek watershed that now flows into Anderson Lake. However, if the Coyote Creek Percolation Reservoir were a migration barrier, then only Upper Penitencia Creek would have provided suitable habitat for coho salmon after 1934. San Felipe Creek currently contains habitat potentially suitable to coho salmon with low stream temperatures related to cool groundwater discharges in the Calaveras Fault zone. During early June and late-July 1997, the senior author recorded water temperatures within the San Felipe Creek watershed within pools containing rainbow trout between 51.8 to 55.9 °F (11 to 13.3 °C) and 57.9 to 63.9 °F (14.4 to 17.7 °C), respectively. Zones of groundwater discharge along the Calaveras Fault zone that traverses the watershed maintain cool summer water temperatures. Upper Penitencia Creek, which enters lower Coyote Creek near its mouth and drains the steep coastal hills to the east also may have contained suitable coho salmon habitat.

A 1962 California Department of Fish and Wildlife report indicates that North American beaver (Castor canadensis) lived in Coyote Creek historically. This report is consistent with Alexander McLeod's report on the progress of the first Hudson's Bay Company fur brigade sent to California in 1829, "Beaver is become an article of traffic on the Coast as at the Mission of St. Joseph alone upwards of Fifteen hundred Beaver Skins were collected from the natives at a trifling value and sold to Ships at 3 Dollars". Physical proof of historical beaver in south San Francisco Bay tributaries is a Castor canadensis subauratus skull in the Smithsonian Institution National Museum of Natural History collected by zoologist James Graham Cooper in Santa Clara, California on Dec. 31, 1855. Beaver recolonized Coyote Creek in the 2010s (see photo of beaver dam), apparently using the Bay to move from the Guadalupe River watershed. In late 2023, a Chinook salmon hen was photographed building a redd just below a beaver dam above Charcot Avenue in San Jose (see Photo Gallery below).

A 1995 study showed high levels of toxic substances in receiving waters and sediments along urban areas of the creek versus undeveloped areas. This correlates to the density of storm drains suggesting that the pollution is from urban run-off.

The Friends of Coyote Creek community group merged with the South Bay Clean Creeks Coalition in 2018.

Coyote Creek photo gallery:

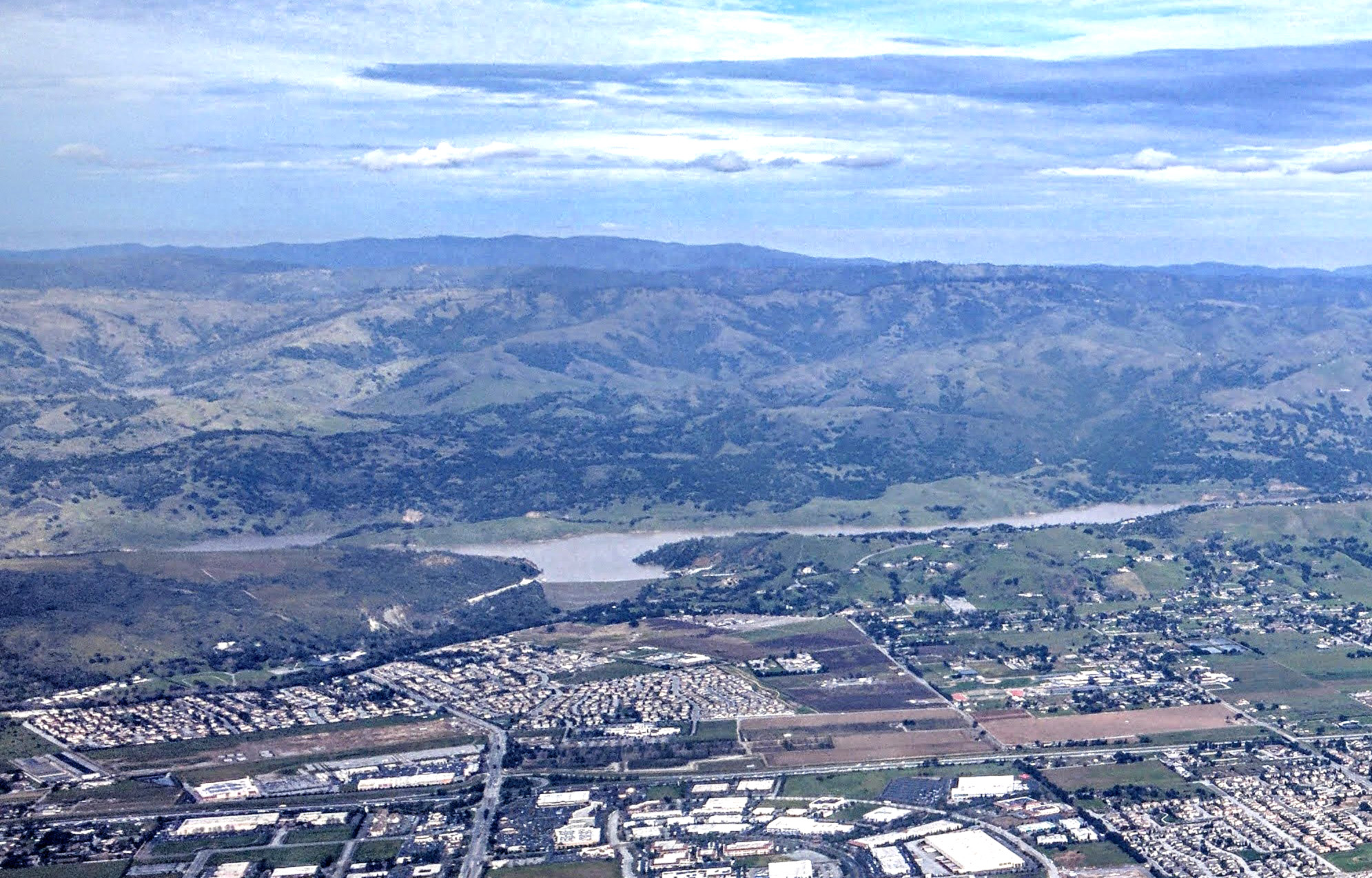
Anderson Reservoir, above Morgan Hill and San Jose, California, near capacity, two weeks after its overflow flooded neighborhoods in San Jose in 2017

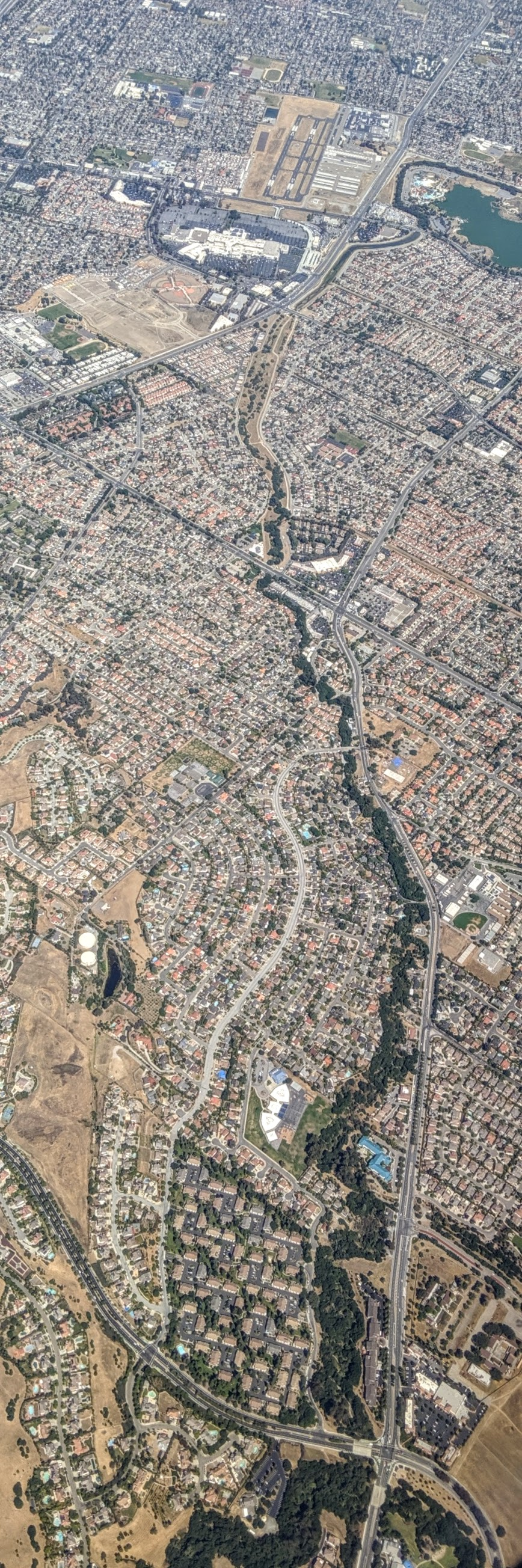
Paralleling Coyote Creek to the east is its tributary Thompson Creek, along San Felipe Road with Reid–Hillview Airport and Lake Cunningham at top, Yerba Buena Road at bottom

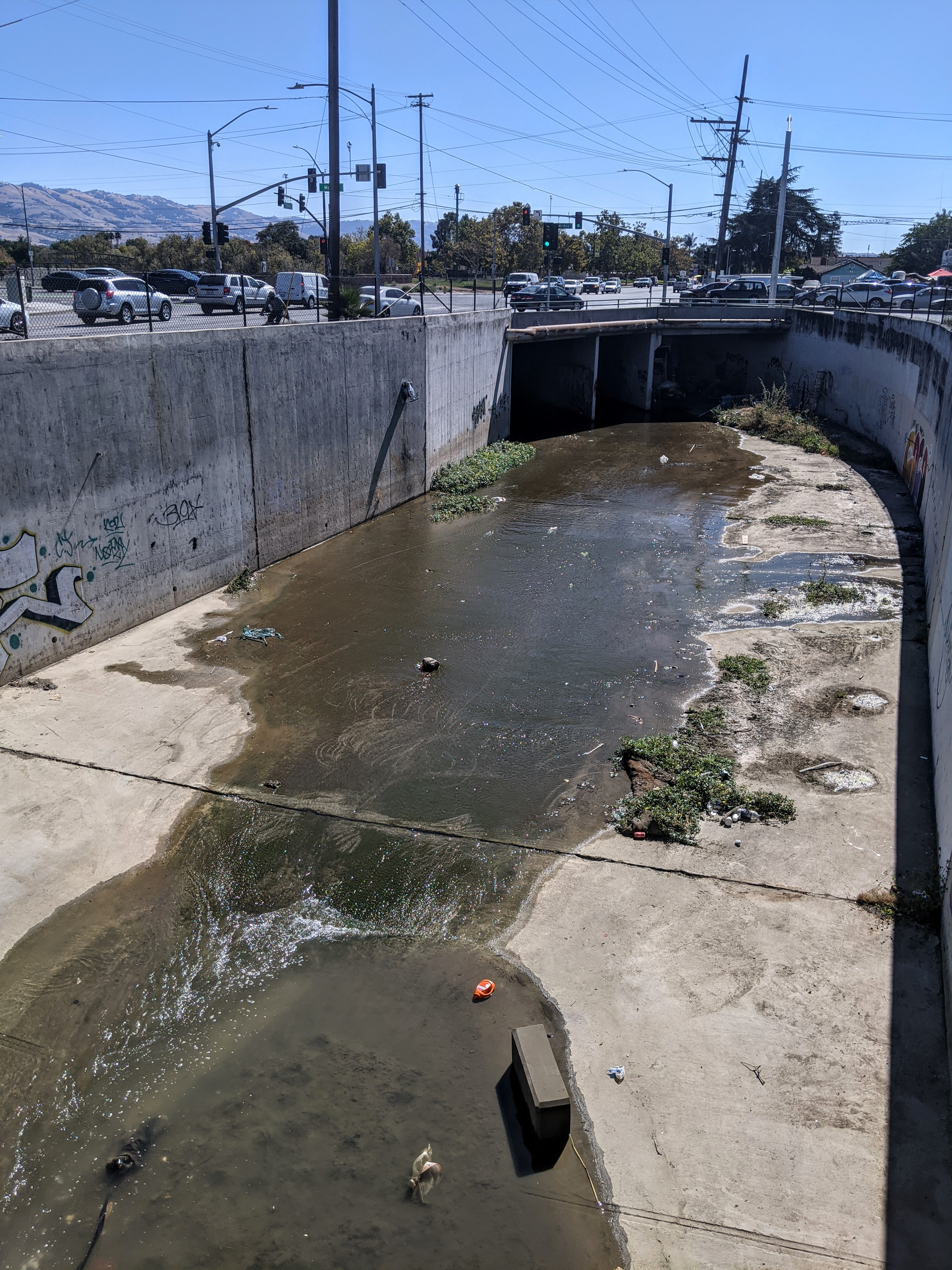
Lower Silver Creek tributary where it comes from under McKee Road and King Road to join Coyote Creek

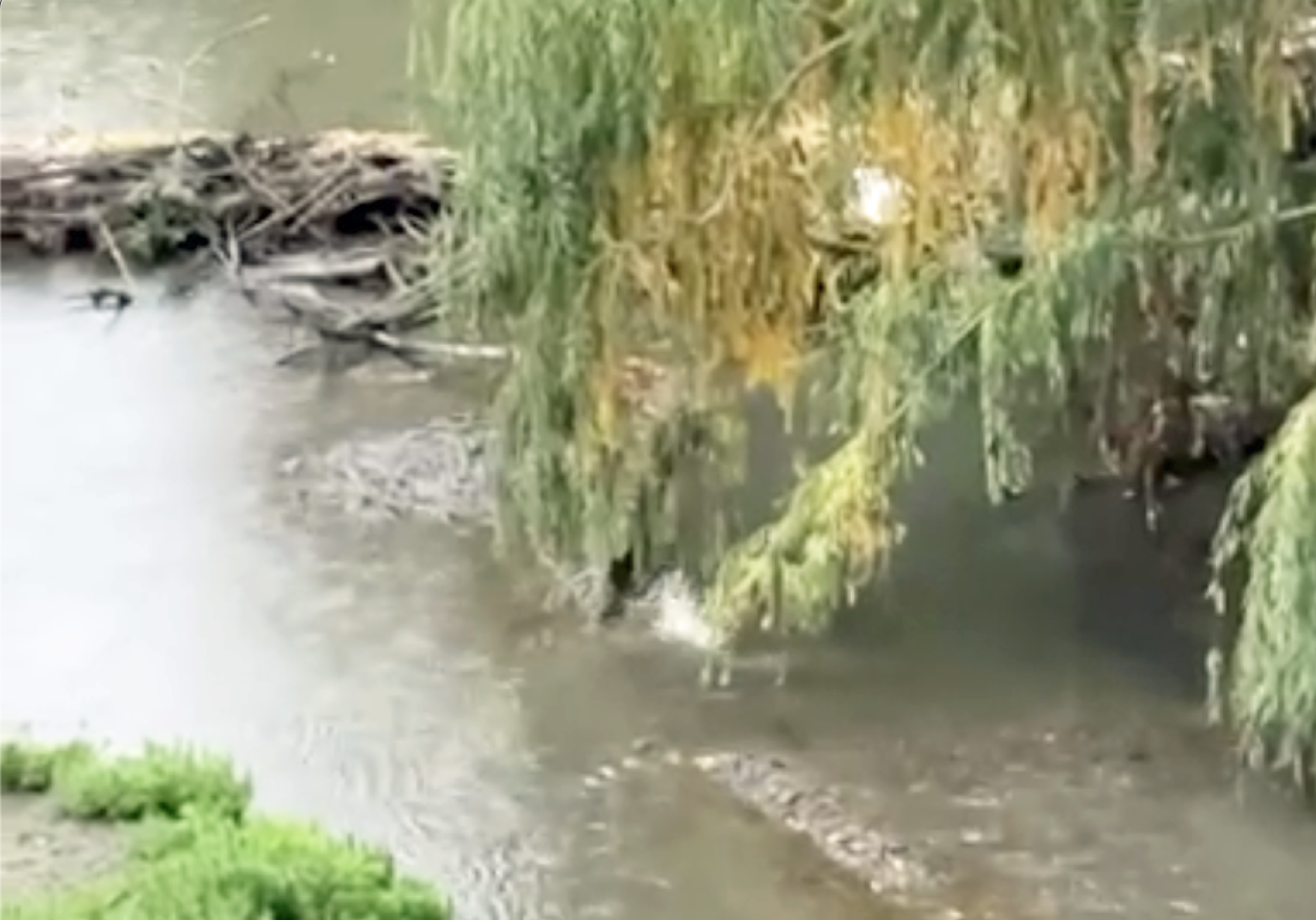
Large Chinook salmon hen building redd (see splash where willow branches touch the water) just below Coyote Creek beaver dam at Charcot Avenue

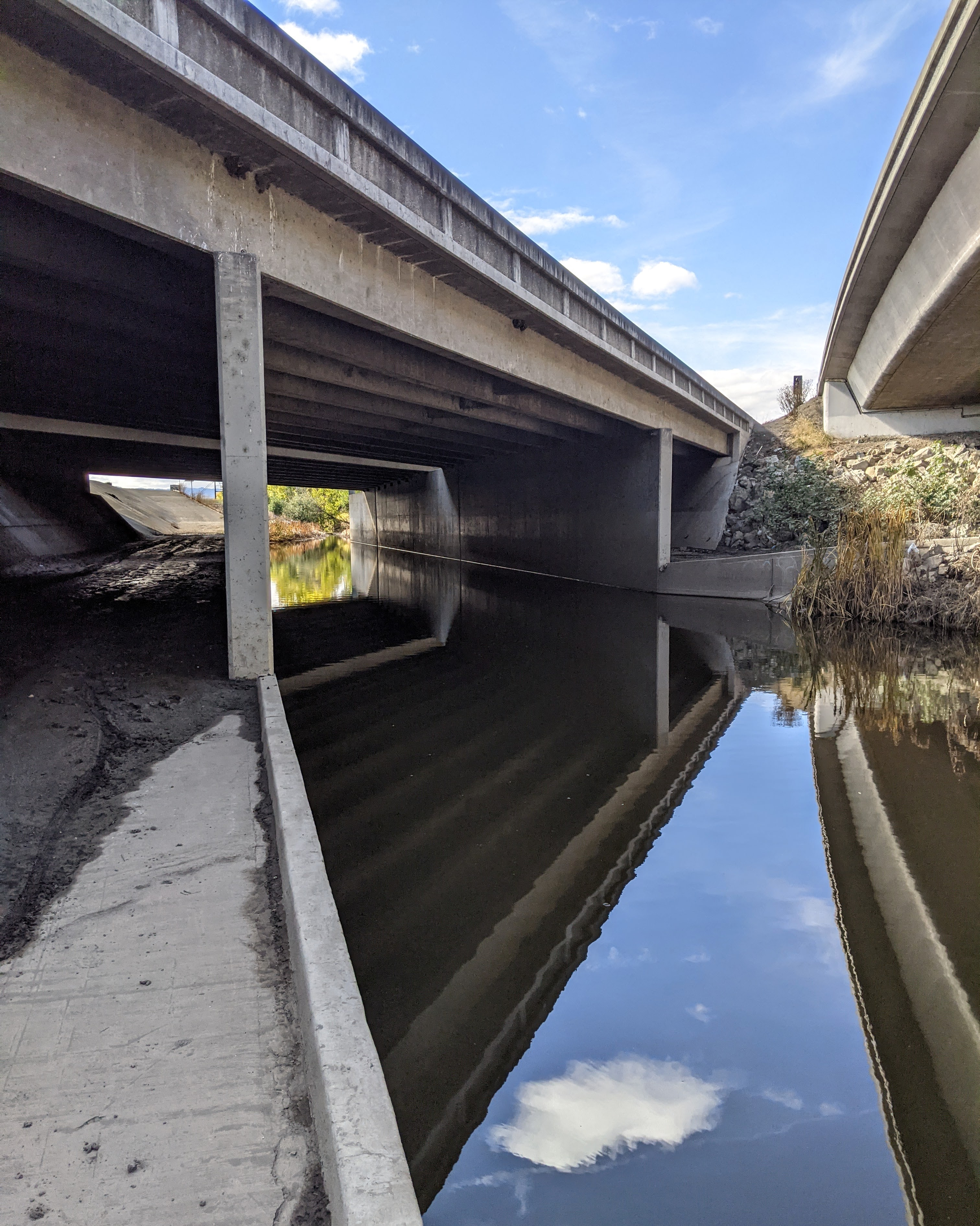
Coyote Creek under Highway 237

== See also ==
- List of rivers in California
- List of watercourses in the San Francisco Bay Area
- The Jungle (homeless encampment) – former homeless encampment located along Coyote Creek
