= Blue Oak Ranch Reserve =

Part of the University of California Natural Reserve System

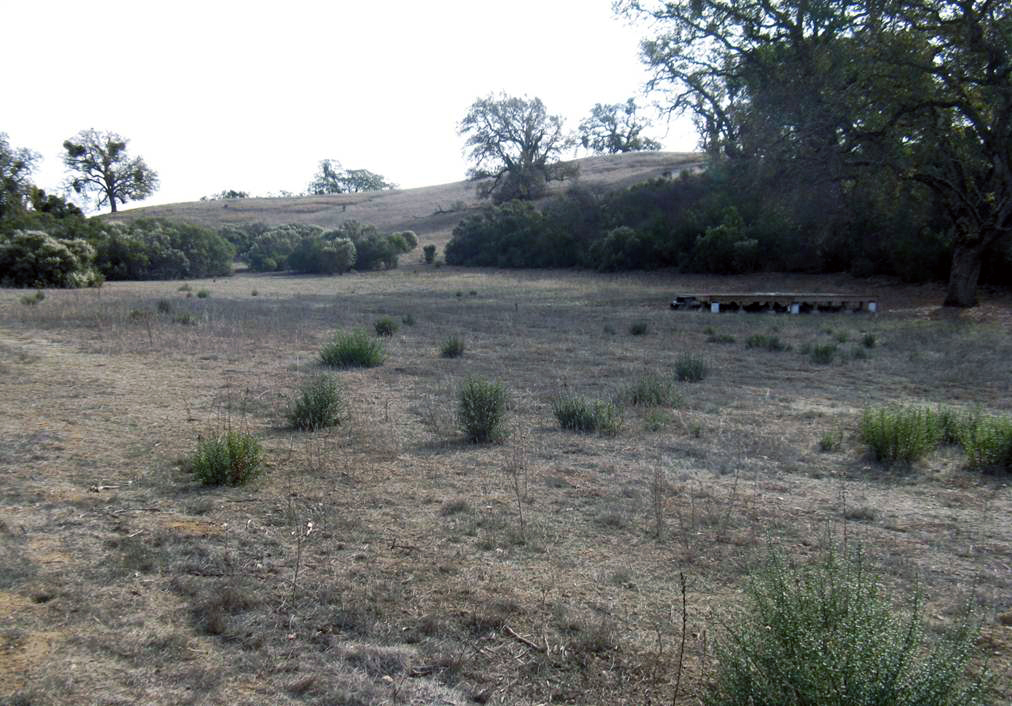

- Location within California Location within the United States
- Location: Santa Clara County, California
- Coordinates: 37°22′53″N 121°44′14″W
- Area: 3,260 acres (5.09 mi^{2})
- Elevation: 1,500 ft (460 m)
- Governing body: University of California, Berkeley
- Website: http://www.blueoakranchreserve.org

The Blue Oak Ranch Reserve, a unit of the University of California Natural Reserve System, is an ecological reserve and biological field station in Santa Clara County, California. It is located on 3,260 acres (13.2 km^{2}) in the Diablo Range, northwest of Mount Hamilton, at 1,500 ft (460 m) elevation.

The land, part of the 19th century Mexican land grant of Rancho Cañada de Pala, was donated to the University of California on December 1, 2007, by the Blue Oak Ranch Trust, an anonymous benefactor.

Overnight accommodations for academic researchers and educational groups may be made by permission only.

== Flora ==
Flora of Blue Oak Ranch Reserve includes:

- purple needle grass (Nassella pulchra)
- barley (Hordeum)
- bluegrass (Poa spp.)
- three-awn (Aristida spp.)
- melic (Melica sspspp
- wildrye (Elymus and Leymus spp.)

Invasive introduced species

- yellow starthistle (Centaurea solstitialis)
- medusahead grass (Taeniatherum caput-medusae)
- Italian thistle (Carduus pycnocephalus)
- tocalote (Centaurea melitensis)
- Canada thistle (Cirsium arvense)
- bull thistle (Cirsium vulgare)

Plant communities

- valley oak woodland
- black oak woodland
- coast live oak woodland
- riparian forest
- chamise chaparral
- Diablan sage scrub
- non-native annual grassland
- wildflower field
- native perennial grassland

== Fauna ==
Fauna of Blue Oak Ranch Reserve includes:

- Western toad
- Pacific tree frog
- Pacific chorus frog
- red-legged frog
- California newt
- California tiger salamander
- Western pond turtle
- red-winged blackbird
- pied-billed grebe
- Canada goose
- American coot
- wood duck

Invasive fish

- sunfish
- largemouth bass
- mosquitofish

== See also ==
- Quercus douglasii — Blue oak
- California oak woodlands — a plant community within the ranch
- California interior chaparral and woodlands — the plant community that the ranch is within
- California chaparral and woodlands ecoregion — ecoregion of the Mediterranean forests, woodlands, and scrub Biome, that the ranch is within
- List of California native plants
- Restoration ecology
