= Cañada de los Osos =

Stream in the United States

- Location within California

Location
- Country: United States
- State: California
- Region: Santa Clara County

Physical characteristics
- Source: Kickham Peak
  - location: 11.5 mi (20 km) east of Gilroy
  - coordinates: 37°02′10″N 121°23′037″W
  - elevation: 1,920 ft (590 m)
- Mouth: Coyote Creek
  - location: 7 mi (11 km) east of San Martin
  - coordinates: 37°04′21″N 121°28′42″W
  - elevation: 830 ft (250 m)
- Length: 8 mi (13 km)confluence to mouth

Cañada de los Osos is an 8 miles (13 km) stream that flows west and then north to join Coyote Creek in the Diablo Range south of Henry Coe State Park in southern Santa Clara County, California, United States. It is now protected within the 5,800 acre Cañada de los Osos Ecological Preserve, managed by the California Department of Fish and Wildlife about 10 miles (16 km) east of Gilroy, California.

== Etymology ==
Cañada de los Osos is Spanish for "Valley of the Bears".

== Ecology ==
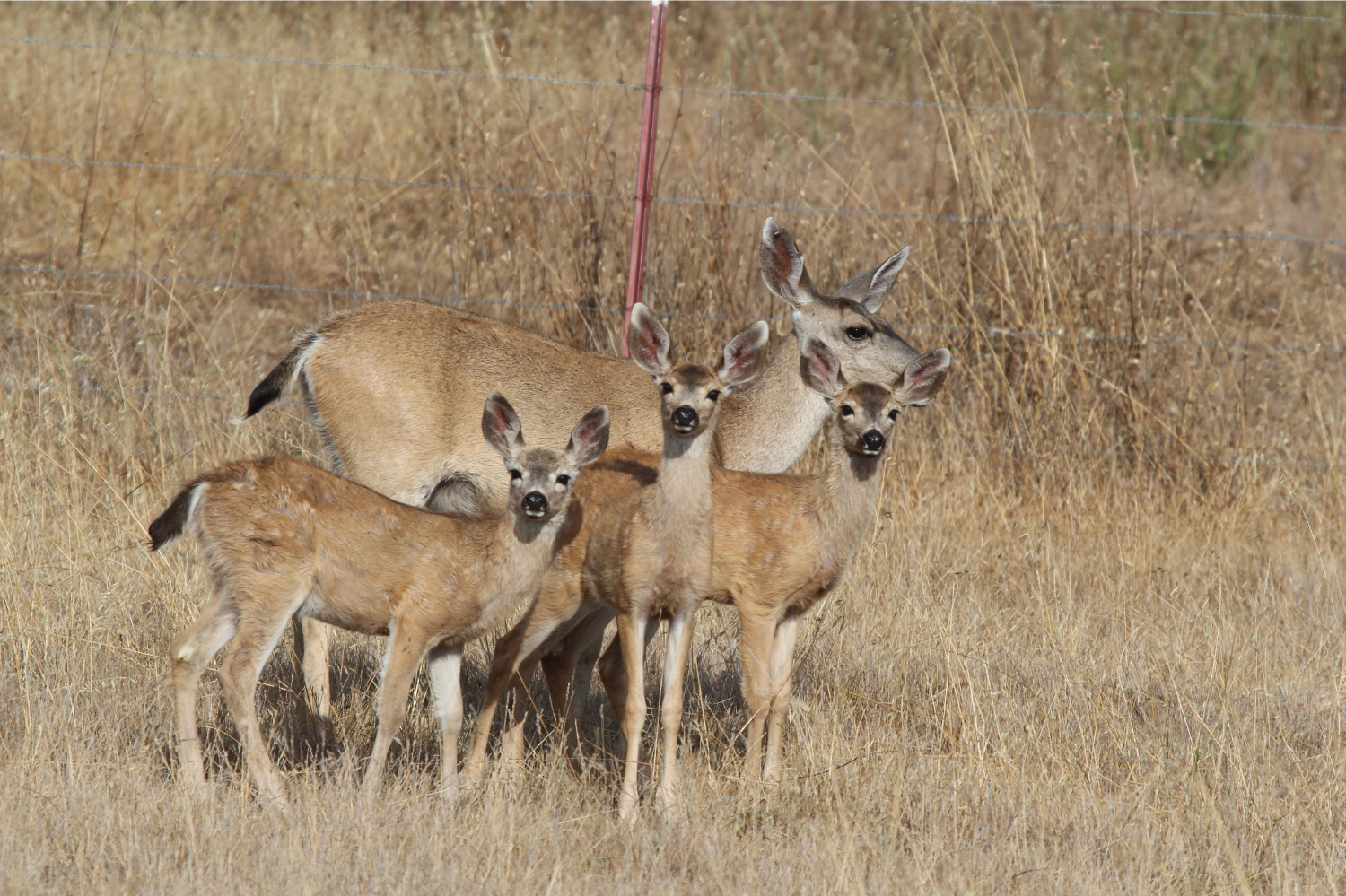
California mule deer doe with triplet fawns reflecting ecological health of Cañada de los Osos Ecological Reserve, courtesy of Henry Coletto

The Cañada de los Osos Ecological Reserve was formerly known as Stevenson Ranch, and was designated as an ecological reserve by the California Fish and Game Commission in 2003. After almost two decades of restoration the Reserve hosts native grasses, cottonwoods, valley oaks (Quercus lobata) and animals such as tule elk (Cervus canadensis nannodes) and pronghorn (Antilocapra americana) where once thousands of cattle were ranched. A volunteer organization called The Friends of the Cañada de los Osos is headed by former County Wildlife Ranger and Game Warden, Henry Coletto, who led the original translocations restoring elk and pronghorn to Santa Clara County.

Fawn survival and overall California mule deer (Odocoileus hemionus californicus) numbers on the Cañada de Los Osos Ecological Reserve are higher than other parts of the Diablo Range, coinciding with water development, protection from livestock, and other habitat improvements on the Reserve over the last 20 years. Over 40 springs have been upgraded by removing old livestock troughs and replacing them with small ground-level wildlife watering facilities, or wildlife drinkers. The drinkers provide high quality clean water compared to stock ponds that dry up or have poor water quality by mid-summer.

== See also ==
- Coyote Creek
- Henry Coe State Park
