= San Felipe Creek =

San Felipe Creek may mean;

- San Felipe Creek (Salton Sea), a stream in Imperial and San Diego Counties of California
- San Felipe Creek (Santa Clara County, California), a stream in Santa Clara County, California
- San Felipe Creek (Texas), a stream in Val Verde County, Texas, tributary to the Rio Grande
