= San Felipe Creek (Santa Clara County) =

Stream in the United States

San Felipe Creek San Felipe River

Location
- Country: United States
- State: California
- Region: Santa Clara County

Physical characteristics
- Source: Master's Hill in the western Diablo Range
  - location: Western edge of Joseph D. Grant County Park
  - coordinates: 37°20′19″N 121°44′07″W
  - elevation: 2,200 ft (670 m)
- Mouth: Confluence with Las Animas Creek, just upstream of Anderson Lake
  - location: 8 mi (13 km) west of Milpitas, California
  - coordinates: 37°12′48″N 121°39′24″W
  - elevation: 650 ft (200 m)
- Length: 14 mi (23 km)

Basin features
- Tributaries
  - left: Boyds Creek, Cow Creek (San Felipe Creek), Carlin Canyon Creek

San Felipe Creek is a 14 miles (23 km) stream that originates in the western Diablo Range in Santa Clara County, California. It flows south by southeast through two historic ranchos, Rancho Los Huecos and Rancho Cañada de San Felipe y Las Animas before it joins Las Animas Creek just above Anderson Reservoir. One of the nine major tributaries of Coyote Creek, the creek's waters pass through the Santa Clara Valley and San Jose on the way to San Francisco Bay.

== History ==
The San Felipe Creek and San Felipe Valley place names are preserved in the records of the Rancho Cañada de San Felipe y Las Animas Mexican land grants in 1938 and 1844. The creek was called San Felipe River on Wilkes's map of 1841.

The families of HP pioneers Bill Hewlett and David Packard bought the lands of the San Felipe Valley, and assembled the 28,359 acres (114.76 km^{2}) San Felipe Ranch. Maintained as a working ranch for some 50 years, the ranch is now protected by a Nature Conservancy conservation easement.

== Watershed ==
San Felipe Creek begins on the eastern side of Master's Hill, just west of Joseph D. Grant County Park. It descends east along Quimby Road into the park just south of the Mt. Hamilton Road and park entry kiosk and Visitor Center. From there it heads south through Hall's Valley and then the San Felipe Valley, picking up Boyds Creek, Cow Creek and then Carlin Canyon Creek (all enter San Felipe Creek from the left heading downstream). It traverses 14 miles (23 km) and its watershed drains 8 square miles (21 km^{2}) before it joins Las Animas Creek just above Anderson Reservoir.

== Habitat and wildlife ==
A 1962 report indicated that San Felipe Creek, as well as much of the Coyote Creek's mainstem and other tributaries, was an historical migration route for steelhead trout (coastal rainbow trout) (Oncorhynchus mykiss irideus). Recent surveys for steelhead trout found that stream resident rainbow trout were abundant in San Felipe Creek and its Cow Creek tributary.

Coho salmon (Oncorhynchus kisutch) were present in the Coyote Creek watershed until the 1950s, suggesting that some spawning and rearing habitat was located in the watershed downstream from Coyote Reservoir which was completed in 1936 (blocking access to 310 square kilometers of upstream watershed). Historically, suitable habitat for coho salmon in the Coyote Creek watershed was likely restricted to the San Felipe Creek and Upper Penitencia Creek watersheds and possibly perennial reaches of Coyote Creek, and a few spring-fed tributaries upstream from Gilroy Hot Springs. Assuming the Coyote Percolation Reservoir was not a complete barrier to coho salmon; the construction of Anderson Dam in 1950 would have eliminated any coho salmon that occurred in the San Felipe Creek watershed that now flows into Anderson Lake. However, if the Coyote Creek Percolation Reservoir were a migration barrier, then only Upper Penitencia Creek would have provided suitable habitat for coho salmon after 1934. San Felipe Creek currently contains habitat potentially suitable to coho salmon with low stream temperatures related to cool groundwater discharges in the Calaveras Fault zone. During early June and late-July 1997, the senior author recorded water temperatures within the San Felipe Creek watershed within pools containing rainbow trout between 11 and 13.3 °C and 14.4-17.7 °C, respectively. Zones of groundwater discharge along the Calaveras Fault zone that traverses the watershed maintain cool summer water temperatures.

Tule elk (Cervus canadensis spp. nannodes) were re-introduced to the San Felipe Ranch in three translocations from 1978 to 1981. These elk were thought to have been extirpated until a breeding pair were discovered in the San Joaquin Valley in 1874–1875. Currently an estimated 400 tule elk roam 1,875 square kilometres (724 sq mi) in northeastern Santa Clara County and southeastern Alameda County. A 1985 study showed that more than 50% of the tule elk diet were grasses.

Rare amphibians that depend on San Felipe Creek include the California red-legged frog (Rana aurora draytonii), Foothill yellow-legged frog (Rana boylii) and the Western pond turtle (Actinemys marmorata ).

== See also ==
- Coyote Creek (Santa Clara County)
- List of watercourses in the San Francisco Bay Area
- Anderson Lake
