= Joseph D. Grant County Park =

Park in California, United States

Coordinates: 37.345495°N 121.687170°W

Directional signage to Joseph D. Grant County Park begins at the ascent of SR 130 to Mount Hamilton.

Joseph D. Grant County Park is the largest county park in Santa Clara County, California. Also known as Grant Ranch Park, this site is situated in the Diablo Range foothills of the eastern Santa Clara Valley. The park is one of 28 owned by Santa Clara County and managed by the Santa Clara County Parks and Recreation Department.

Joseph D. Grant, son of a wealthy San Francisco merchant, began buying what had been the Rancho Cañada de Pala Mexican land grant. Grant used the property for grazing cattle, recreating, and hunting game. Joseph D. Grant died in 1942. Santa Clara County purchased approximately 9,553 acres (38.7 km^{2}) of the land in 1975, and created this public park.

Joseph D. Grant County Park is situated in the Diablo Range, near Mount Hamilton. Elevations range from about 1,400 feet (427 m) in Halls Valley to peaks over 2,985 feet (910 m) on the Park's eastern edge. This upward gradient leads to even higher peaks in the crest of the range and to Mount Hamilton itself at 4,209 feet (1,283 m). The western slopes of Mount Hamilton drop into Smith Creek which forms the eastern boundary of the Park.

The park is known for mountain biking, birdwatching and hiking. Some of the special status biota within Joseph D. Grant County Park are the burrowing owl and the Western pond turtle. The park also offers camp sites.

== Gallery ==
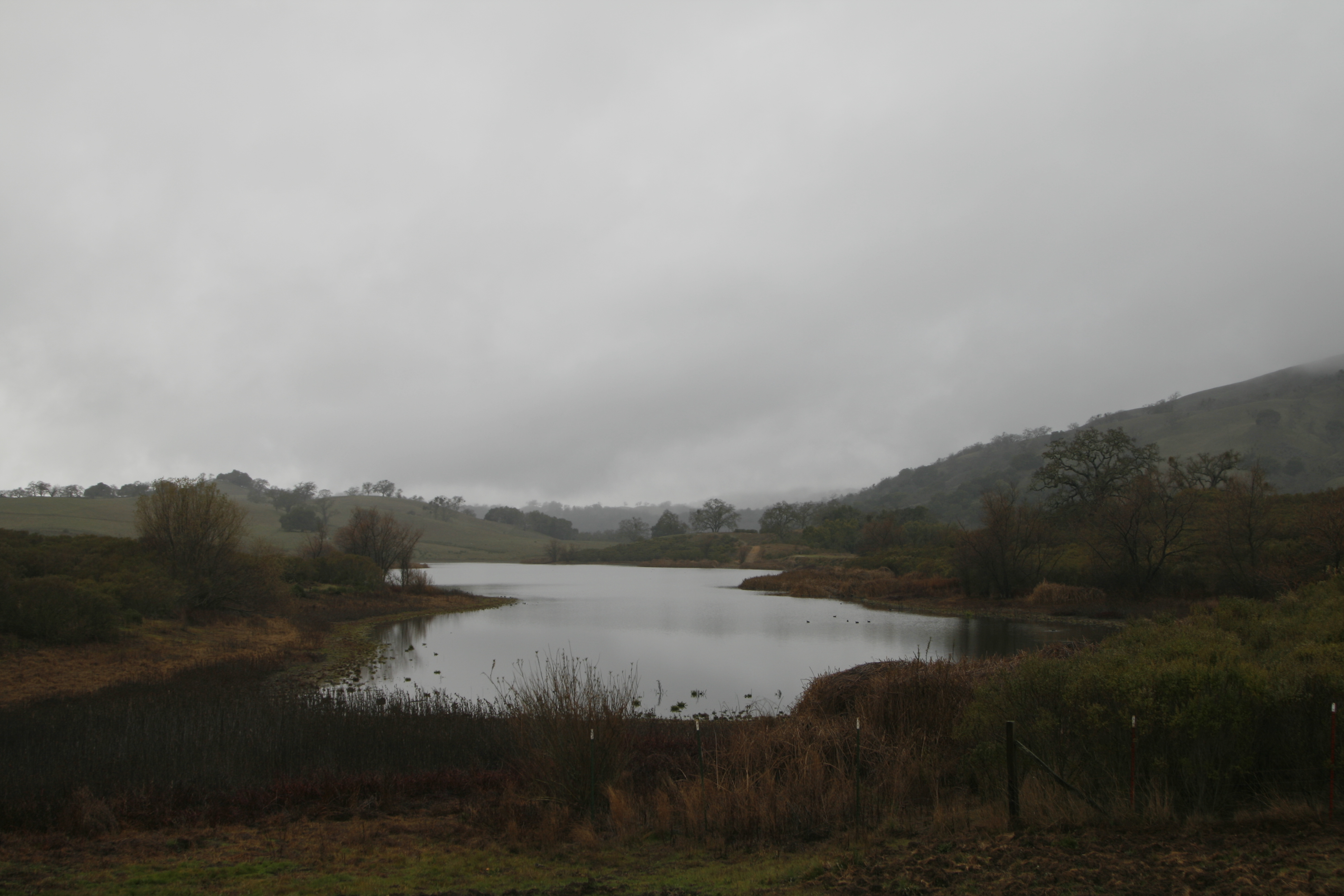
Joseph D Grant Ranch Park, Grant Lake, Midwinter

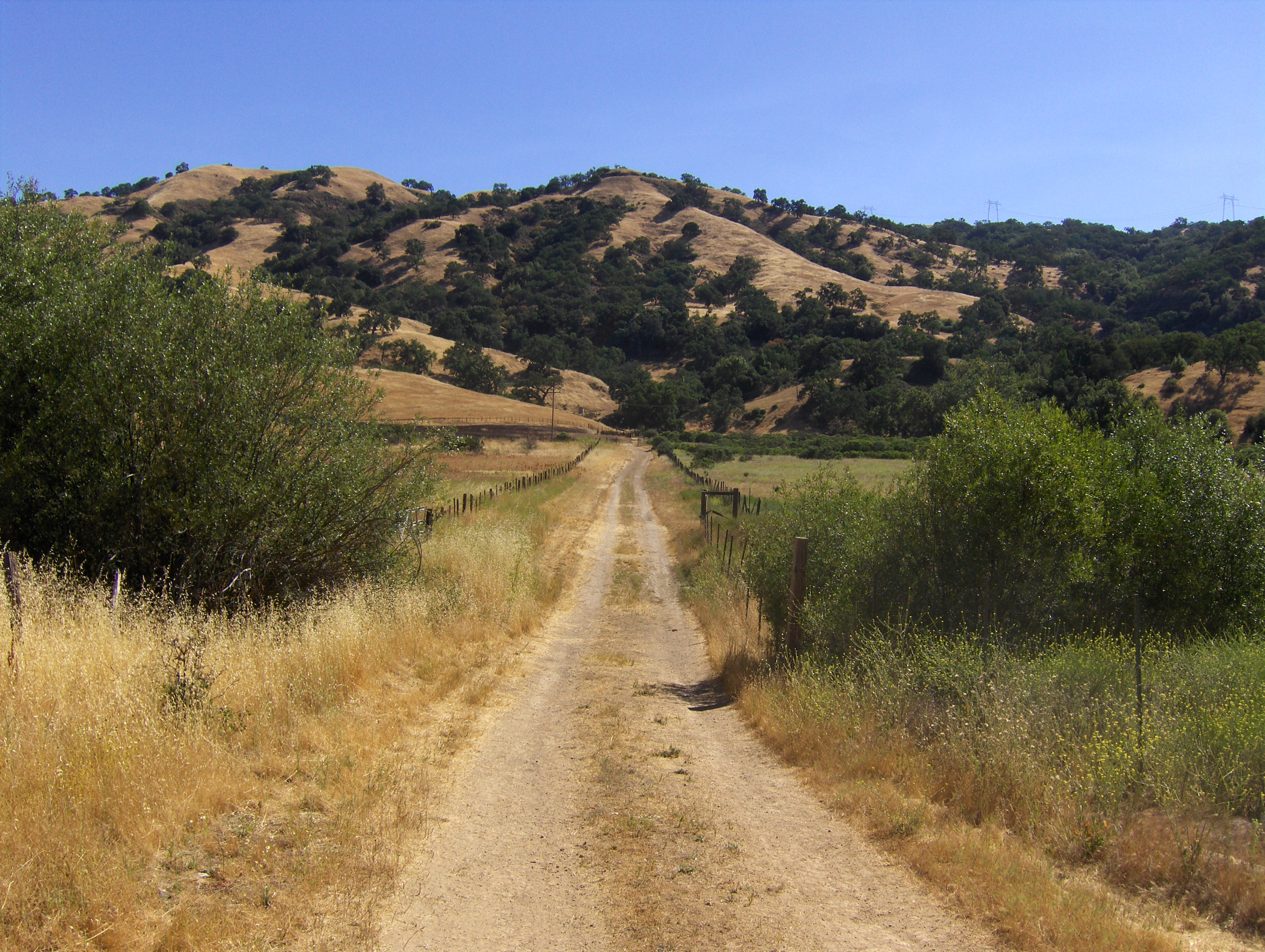
Joseph D Grant Ranch Park, Corral Trail, Midsummer

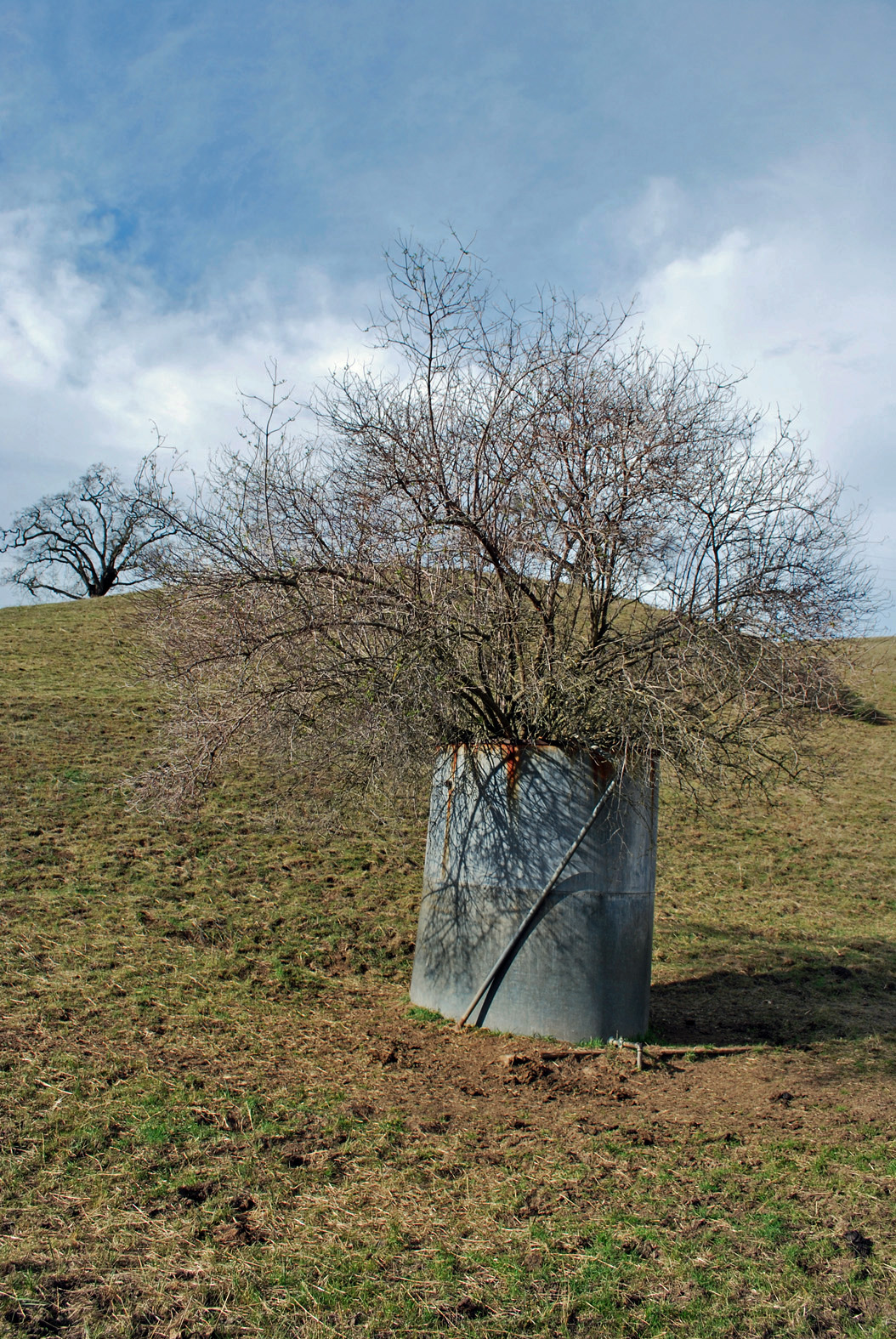
Rusted Water Tank hosts a tree

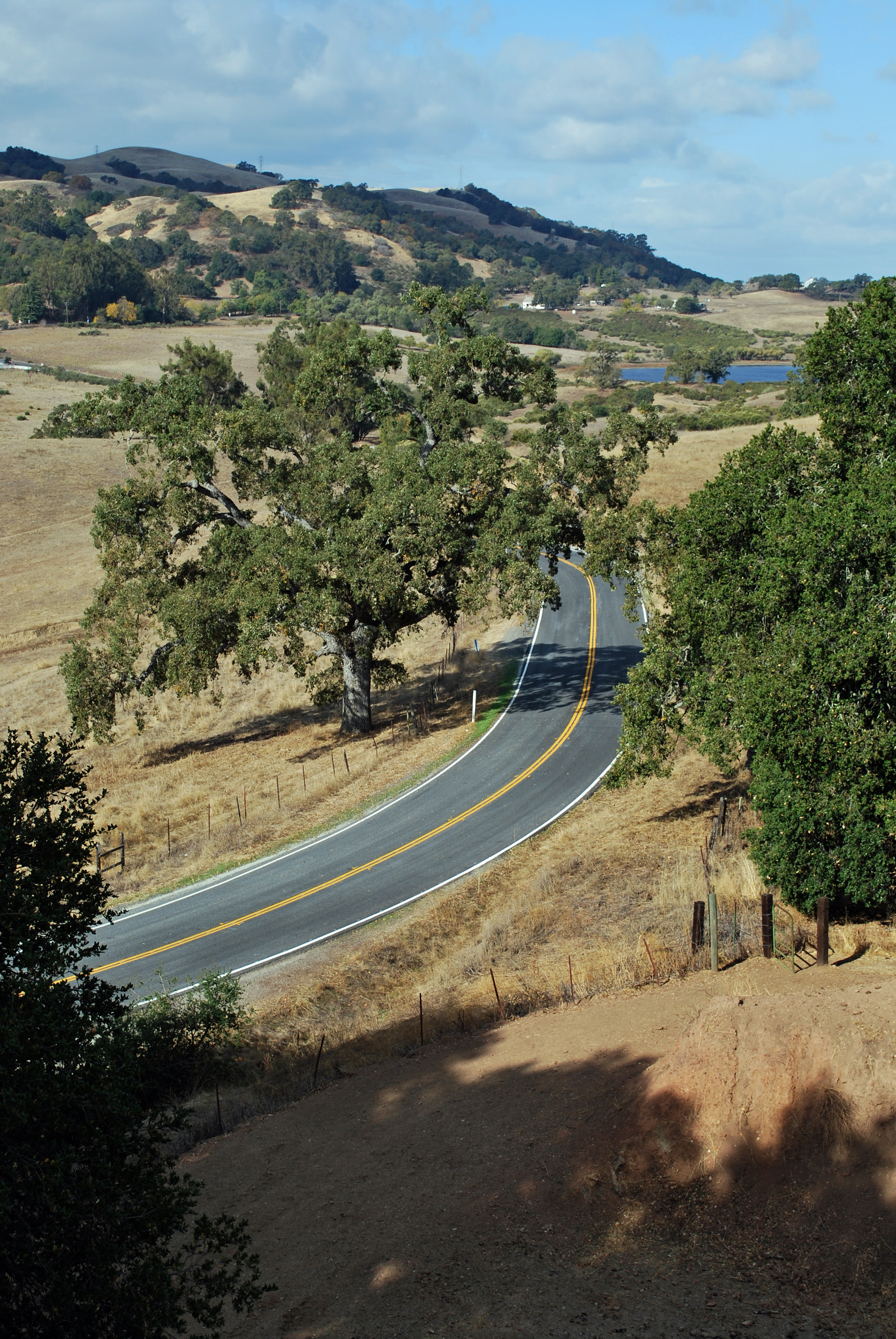
Mount Hamilton Road

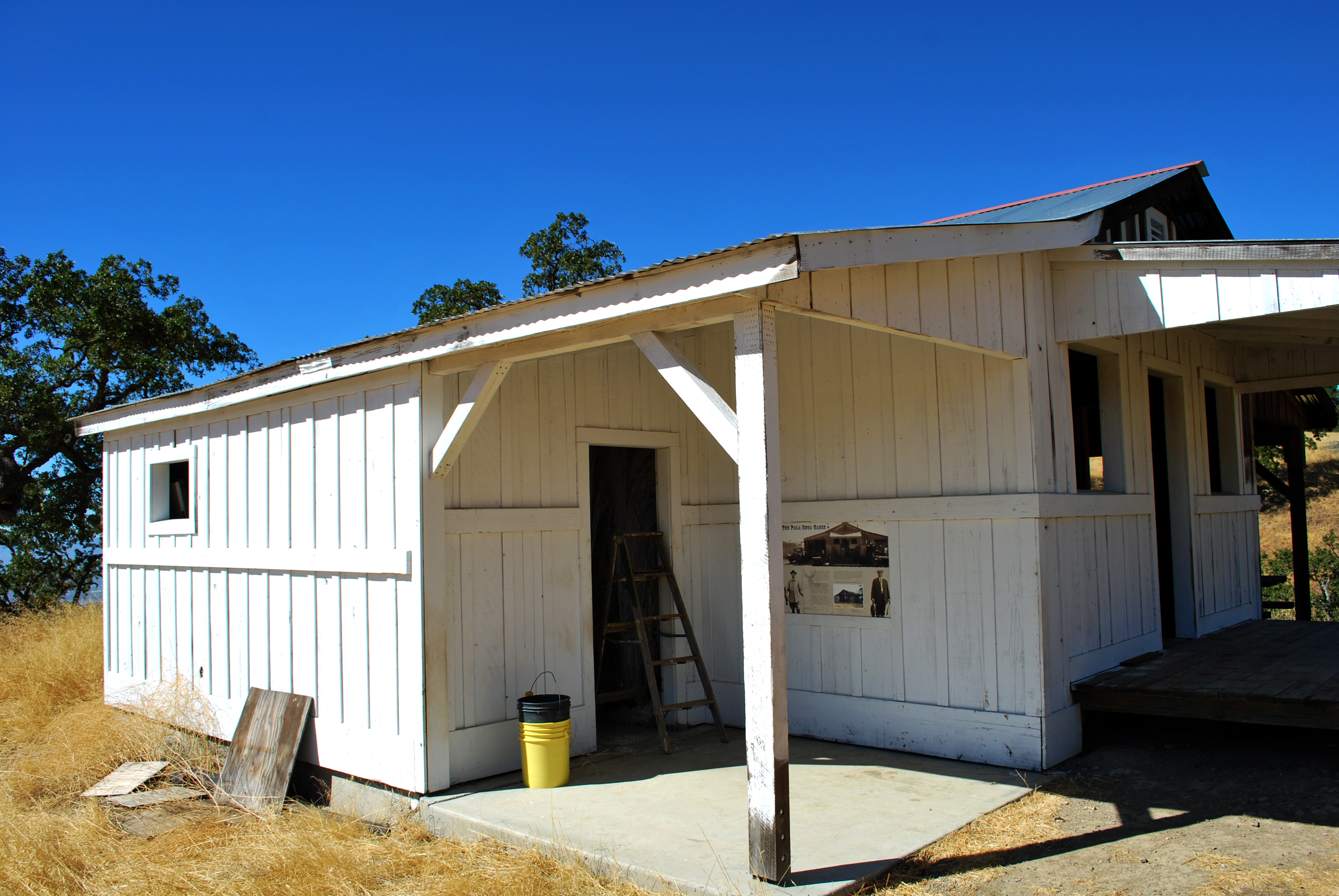
Historic cabin used for hunting and fishing

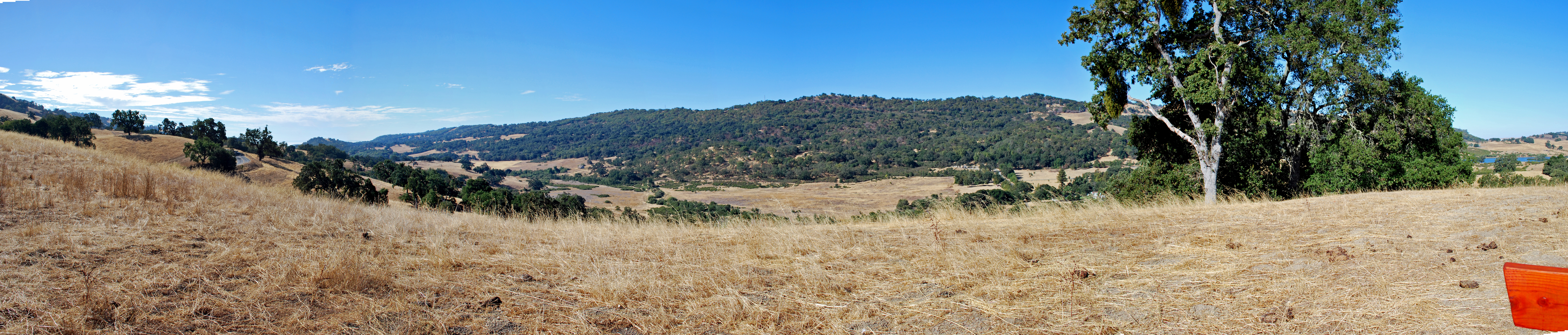
Panoramic View from Mano Seca Cowpie Bench, September 2012

== See also ==
- Blue Oak Ranch Reserve
- Mount Hamilton
