= Silver Creek Fault =

The Silver Creek Fault is a potentially seismically active, northwest–southeast trending strike-slip fault structure in Santa Clara County, California. The Silver Creek Fault runs through and adjacent to the 25-mile-long (40 km), 5-mile-wide (8 km) Evergreen Basin, and generally lies parallel and between the Guadalupe River and Coyote Creek, running directly through the center of San Jose. It also runs parallel to the Hayward Fault, which is located 5 miles (8 km) to the east.

No historic activity of the Silver Creek Fault has been recorded. The City of San José considers the fault to be a rupture hazard only in the foothills but not in the Santa Clara Valley floor. Studies in 2003 and 2004 for the Silicon Valley BART extension, which will cross the fault, found that the northern segment may be as shallow as 100 feet (30 m) deep but found no evidence of surface rupture. A 2017 article suggests that the fault may have effectively become dormant or abandoned roughly 1.5 to 2.5 million years ago.

Research in 2003 suggested that an extension of the Silver Creek Fault may run the entire length of the East Bay, but by 2010 the California Geological Survey's state Fault Activity Map had truncated the Silver Creek Fault south of Fremont.

== See also ==
- Richter scale
- Silicon Valley
