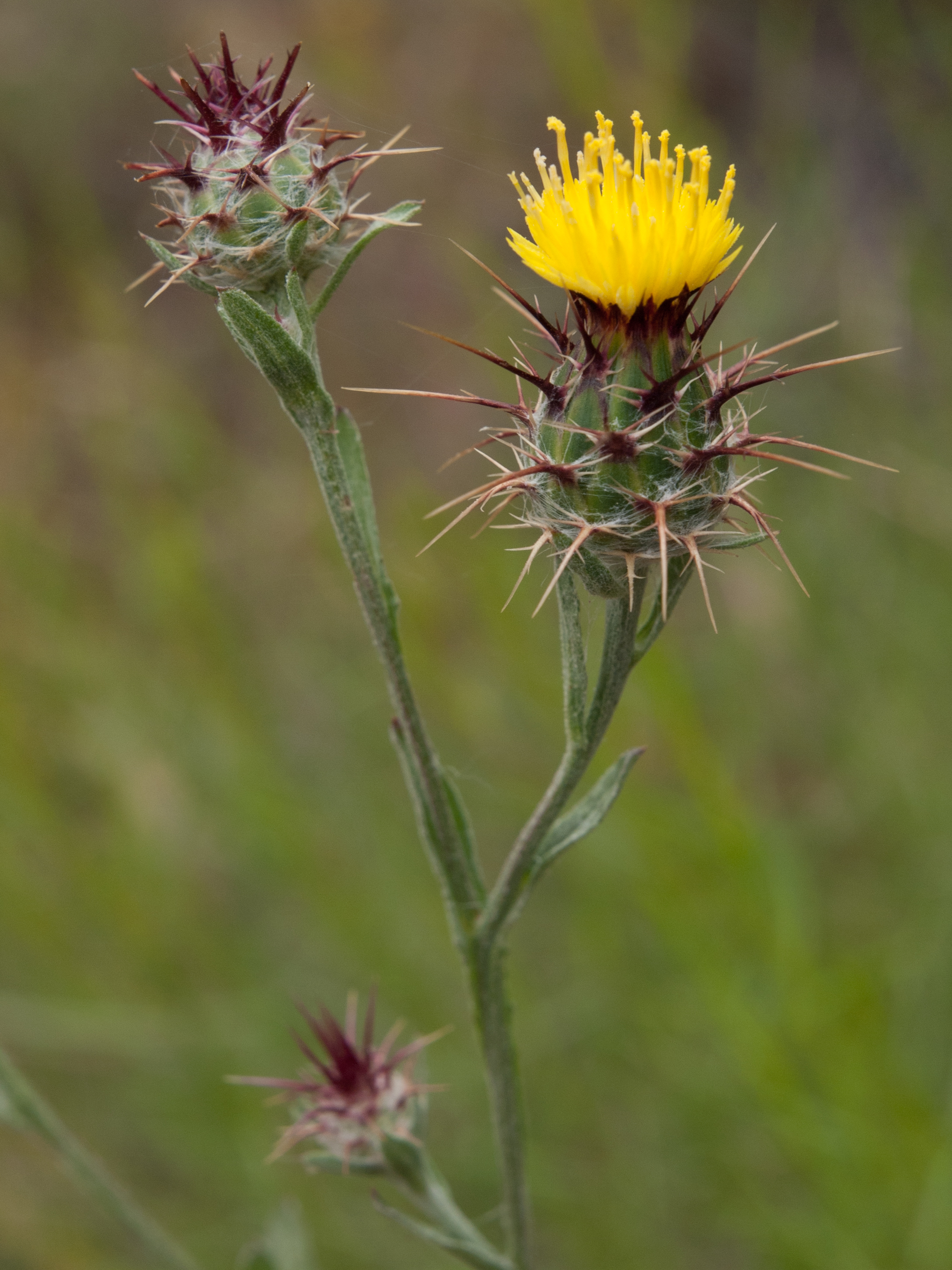

Scientific classification
- Kingdom: Plantae
- Clade: Tracheophytes
- Clade: Angiosperms
- Clade: Eudicots
- Clade: Asterids
- Order: Asterales
- Family: Asteraceae
- Genus: Centaurea
- Species: C. melitensis

Binomial name
- Centaurea melitensis L.

= Centaurea melitensis =

Species of flowering plant

Centaurea melitensis (called Maltese star-thistle in Europe, tocalote or tocolote in western North America) is an annual plant in the family Asteraceae, 1 to 11 decimetres (4 to 43 in) high, with resin-dotted leaves and spine-tipped phyllaries. This plant is native to the Mediterranean region of Europe and Africa. It was introduced to North America in the 18th century; the first documented occurrence in California is in the adobe of a building constructed in San Fernando in 1797. It is also naturalized on a number of Pacific islands.

== Conservation ==
It is considered rare on the Maltese Islands, being listed in the Red Data Book.

== Gallery ==
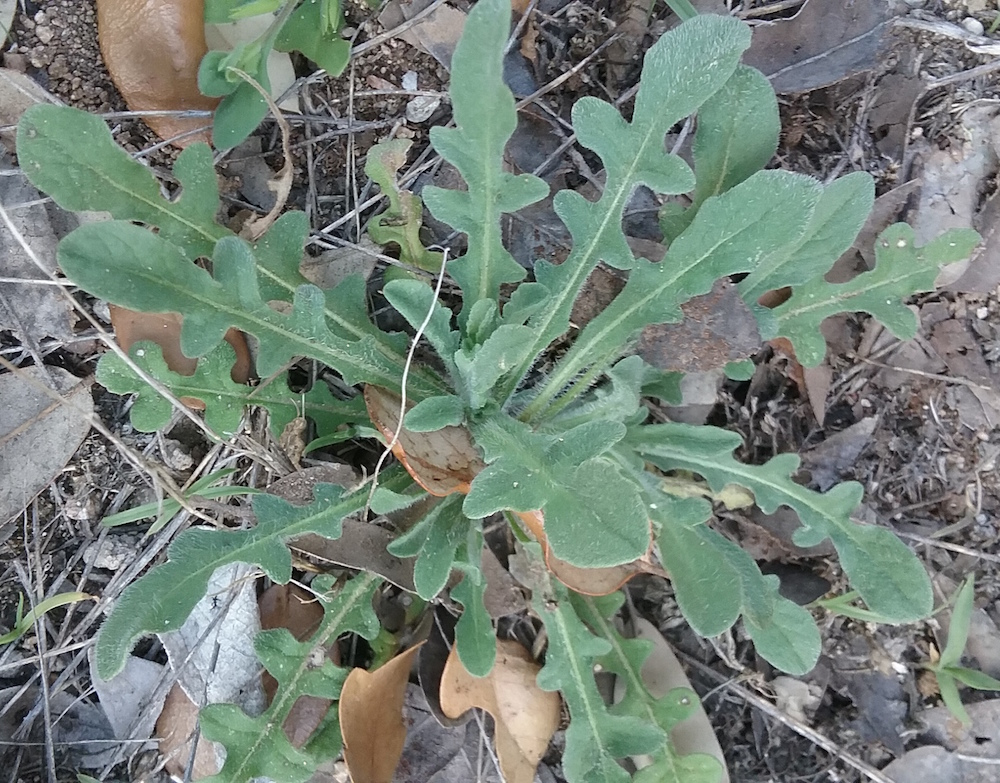

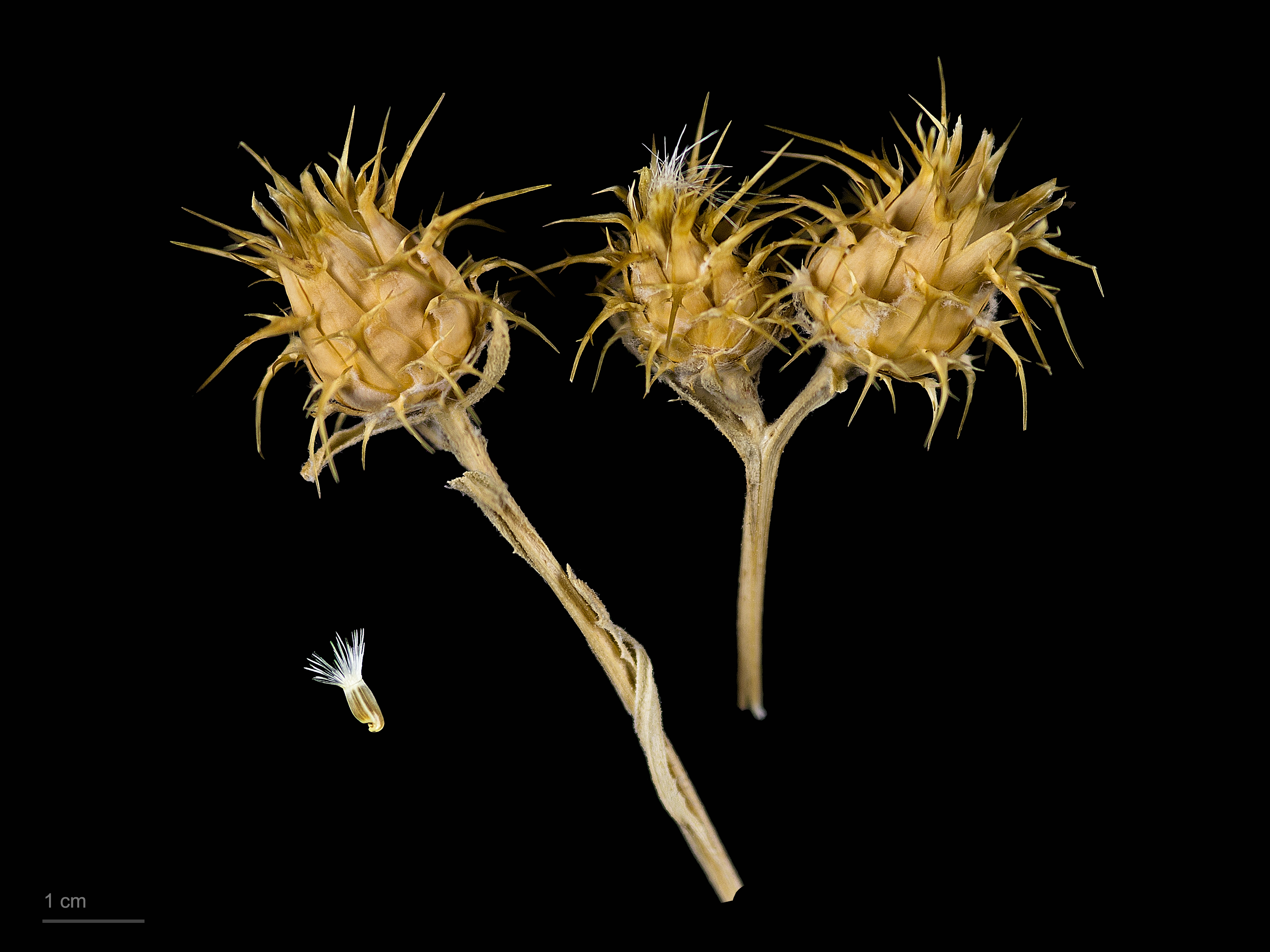
