= Mount Sizer =

Mountain in California, United States

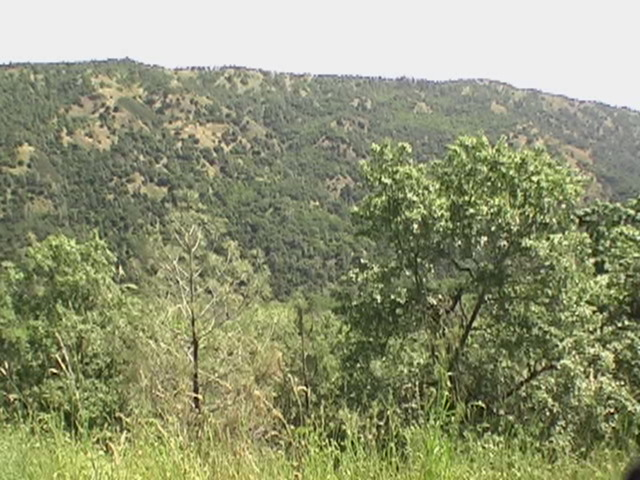
- Mount Sizer, highest point in photo as seen from Hobbs Road just above Deer Horn Spring.

Highest point
- Elevation: 3,219 ft (981 m) NAVD 88
- Coordinates: 37°12′50″N 121°30′49″W

Geography
- Location: Santa Clara County, California, U.S.
- Parent range: Diablo Range
- Topo map: USGS Mount Sizer

Climbing
- Easiest route: Hike

Mount Sizer is a prominent peak located on Blue Ridge in Henry W. Coe State Park, just east of Morgan Hill, California. Because Mount Sizer is the highest point on Blue Ridge and under 10 miles (16 km) from the park's headquarters, it makes it an ideal destination for day hikers. There are two ways to reach the summit. One by trails and one by a combination of trail and fire road. The fire road route leads almost directly up Blue Ridge to Mount Sizer and is affectionately nicknamed "The Shortcut". This road rises roughly 1,500 feet (457 m) in 1.3 miles (2.1 km) giving it an average grade of 22%. The park map by Pine Ridge Association lists the peak at 3216' elevation, but some other sources seem to place it at 3219 feet.
