= Rancho Cañada de Pala =

Mexican land grant in California

Coordinates: 37.350°N 121.730°W

Rancho Cañada de Pala was a 15,714-acre (63.59 km^{2}) Mexican land grant in present-day Santa Clara County, California given in 1839 by Governor Juan B. Alvarado to José de Jesús Bernal. The origin of the name Cañada de Pala is the subject of debate. The word "pala" translates as "shovel" in Spanish, but means "water", in many Native Californian dialects. The grant was in the foothills and mountains of the Diablo Range, east of San Jose and included most of what is now Grant Ranch Park and all of present-day Blue Oak Ranch Reserve.

== History ==
José de Jesús Bernal was granted Rancho Cañada de Pala in 1839. Jose de Jesus and his two brothers built adobes around a spring-fed pond on a ridge overlooking the Santa Clara Valley. They pastured cattle and horses on this land. Bernal's uncle, Joaquin Bernal, occupied the nearby Rancho Santa Teresa.

With the cession of California to the United States following the Mexican–American War, the 1848 Treaty of Guadalupe Hidalgo provided that the land grants would be honored. As required by the Land Act of 1851, a claim for Rancho Cañada de Pala was filed with the Public Land Commission in 1852, and the grant was patented to José de Jesús Bernal, José Antonio Bernal and Juan Bernal in 1863.

The "Halls Valley" area which encompasses most of the present-day Grant Ranch Park was deeded to Bernal's attorney, Frederick Hall, to pay for processing his claim. In 1850, the southern third of the rancho was sold to Samuel Q. Broughton (1824–). Broughton, a native of Kentucky, came overland to California in 1846. Adam Grant was a founder of Murphy, Grant, & Company, a dry goods store which sold supplies to gold miners, bought his initial holding of Cañada de Pala in 1880. Grant's son, Joseph D. Grant, eventually owned approximately 9,533 acres (38.6 km^{2}). In 1974, Grant Ranch was purchased by Santa Clara County for park use.
