= Wild rye =

Wild rye is a common name used for several grasses. Wild ryes belong to any of three genera:

- Elymus (wheatgrasses)
- Leymus
- Psathyrostachys
