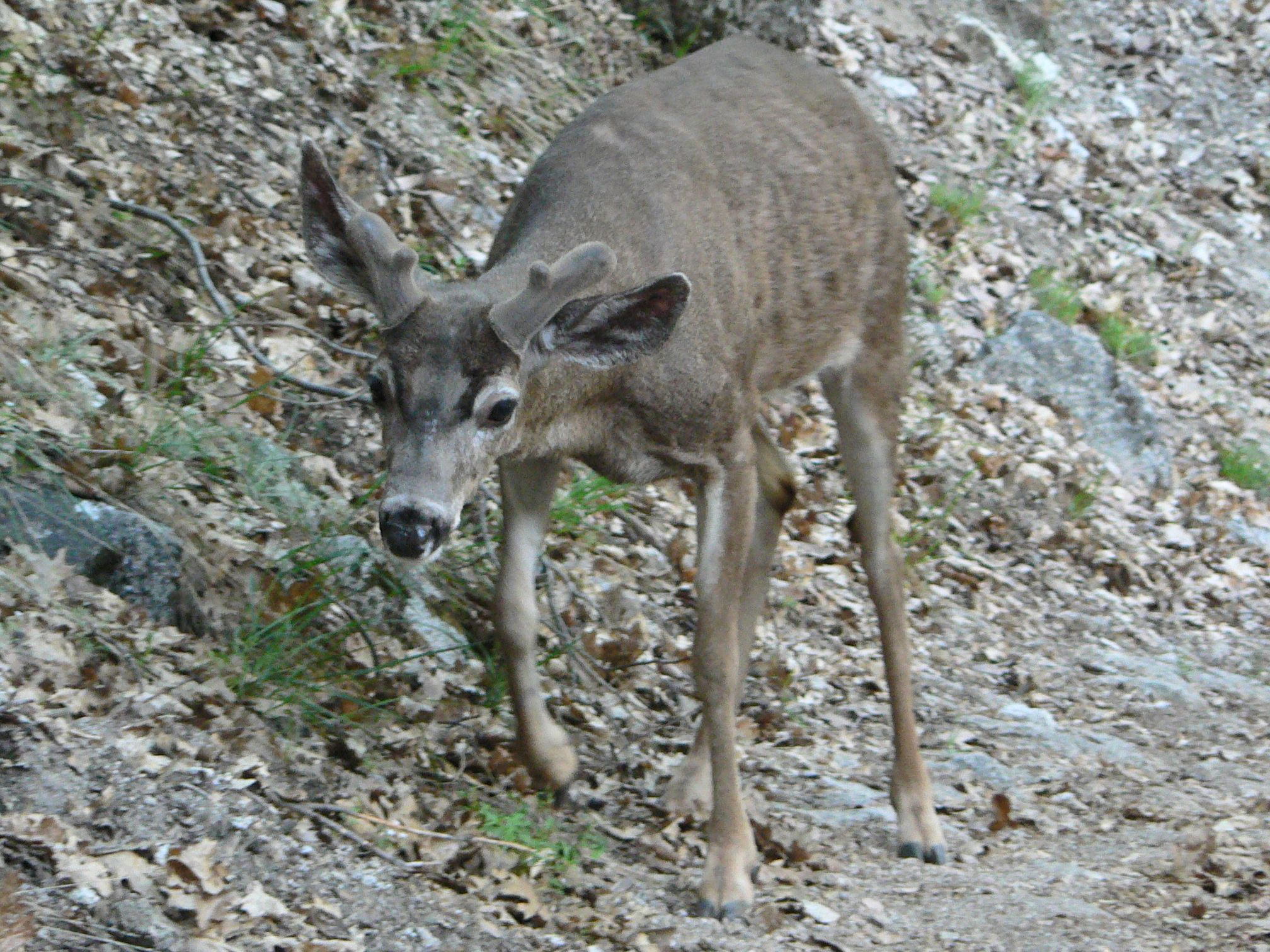
- A young buck in Yosemite National Park

Scientific classification
- Kingdom: Animalia
- Phylum: Chordata
- Class: Mammalia
- Order: Artiodactyla
- Family: Cervidae
- Subfamily: Capreolinae
- Genus: Odocoileus
- Species: O. hemionus
- Subspecies: O. h. californicus

Trinomial name
- Odocoileus hemionus californicus (Caton, 1876)

= California mule deer =

Subspecies of deer

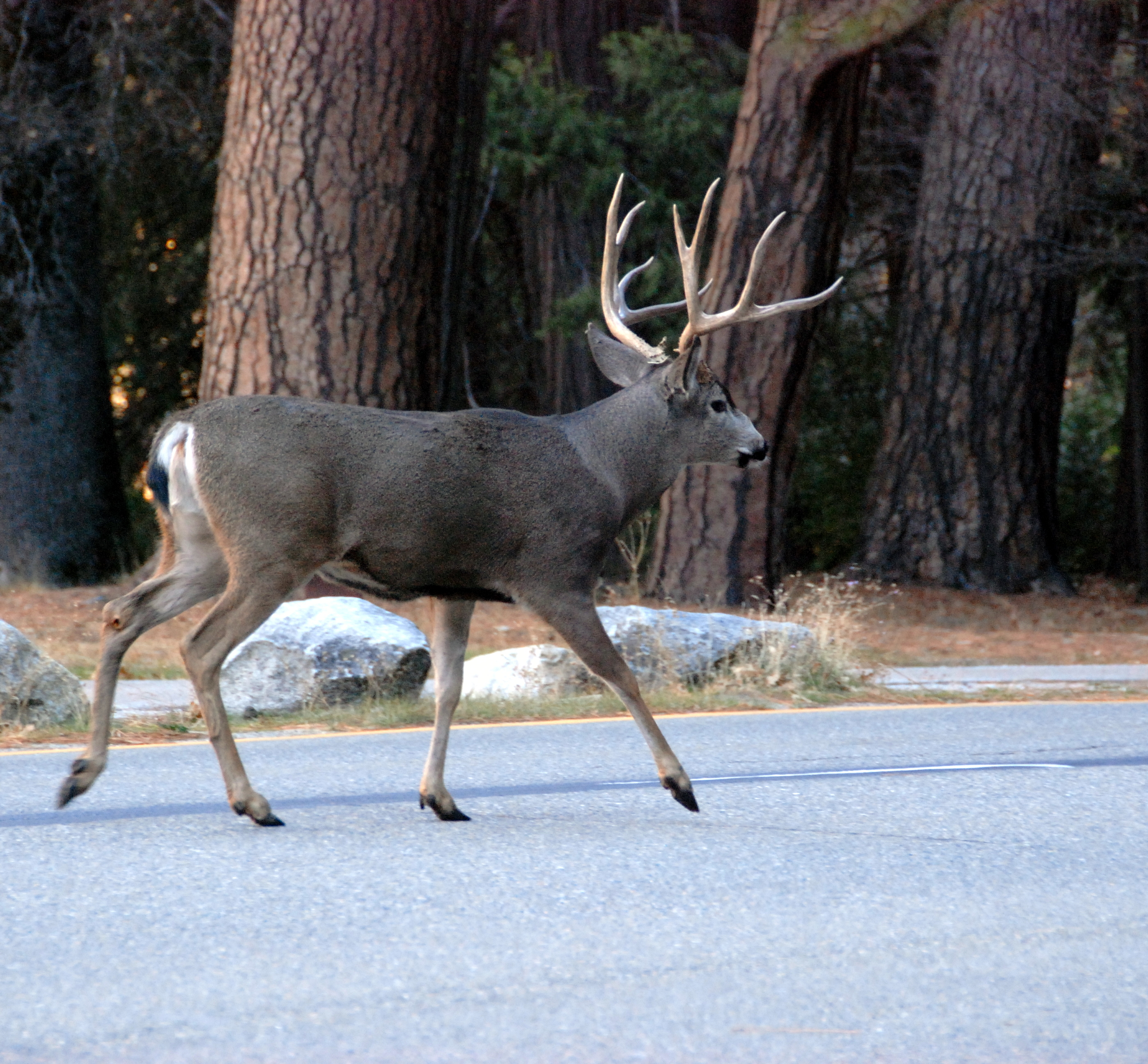
A mature buck in Yosemite National Park

The California mule deer (Odocoileus hemionus californicus) is a subspecies of mule deer whose range covers much of the state of California.

== Anatomy ==
A typical mature male mule deer stands at around 40 inches in height at the shoulder and measures approximately 57 inches in total length, weighing in around 150 pounds in females and 200 pounds in males. Individuals may live up to 22 years in the wild, inhabiting various habitats from coastal prairies to mountains.

The coat color of the California mule deer undergoes seasonal changes, allowing it to adapt to different environmental conditions. In the warmer months, their coat tends to be a lighter, reddish-brown shade, which helps them blend into the dry, sunlit landscapes. During the colder months, the coat becomes a darker, more muted brown, offering better camouflage in the denser, shadowed terrains and against the backdrop of leafless trees or snow. These seasonal changes in coat color are essential for evading predators.

== Distribution ==
This subspecies, O. h. californicus, is widespread throughout northern and central California in the California coastal prairie, as well as inner coastal ranges and interior mountains, especially the Sierra Nevada. This deer is much less frequently found on the floor of the interior valleys, and then mostly frequently in riparian zones. In northern areas including Inyo and Mono counties, their summer ranges are typically located at higher elevations and are characterized by a higher plant density for foraging and fawning areas. They will migrate to lower elevations with more limited food during the winter as the higher elevations become covered with snow. In more southern areas of California including the San Bernardino mountains this migratory shift consists of seasonal elevations migrations rather than a complete shift in ranges.

== Habitat ==
The California Mule deer's habitat generally consists of hilly terrain in oak woodlands. They are abundant throughout Sequoia, King's Canyon, and Yosemite national parks as well as their surrounding areas.

== Diet and behavior ==
California Mule deer often browse for food within a 1-2 mile radius of a water source (including rivers and lakes). They may flatten grass into beds roughly 2 meters in diameter. Frequently used beds may appear significantly more level and decomposed compared to their surrounding environment. This behavior is often observed among bucks during the later fall season as temperatures drop. They will choose a sunny spot, remove any rocks or branches, and take a nap. These beds are often located on grasses or dry leaves under a tree or a rock, or on flattened areas of snow if there is nothing else available.

Mule deer are opportunistic browsers and will consume a large variety of vegetation including stalks, flowers, fruits, forbs, buds, leaves, bark, fungi, lichens, algae, mosses, and ferns. In summer, California mule deer mainly browse on leaves of small trees, shrubs, and herbaceous plants, but also consume many types of berries (including blackberry, huckleberry, salal, and thimbleberry). In winter, they may expand their forage to conifers (particularly twigs of Douglas fir), aspen, willow, dogwood, juniper, and sage. Year-round, they feed on acorns; grasses are a secondary food source. Where humans have encroached on historic deer habitat by suburban development or orchards, California mule deer diversify their diet with garden plant material, tree fruit, and occasionally, pet food.

Fawns and does tend to browse together in familial groupings, while bucks tend to travel singly or with other bucks. California mule deer browse most actively near dawn and dusk, but also forage at night in open agricultural areas or when experiencing hunting pressure.

Mule deer will often form family groups made up of 2 or more generations of females and their fawns. Grown bucks leave these groups and will occasionally form groups with other adult bucks but are more often observed living solitarily. Females will spend their summers isolated in fawning areas after their young have sufficiently grown, where they will remain until the breeding season begins again in the fall.

A doe and her fawns in Auburn, California

== Breeding ==
Mule deer have been classified as occasionally polygamous and occasionally polygynous. The average lifespan of the California Mule Deer is twenty-two years, making it one of the longer-lived mule deer subspecies. Males may wander in search of females, and females will occasionally seek out a dominant buck. Rutting season occurs in autumn starting as early as September and lasting occasionally until March. During this time, the does will come into estrus for a period lasting several days. Males exhibit aggressive behavior in competing for mates. Does begin estrus again if they do not become pregnant in a process that will be repeated up to 5 times with intervals of 22–29 days between estrous periods. The gestation period for these deer is about 200 days, culminating in the birth of fawns during the spring season.

Does typically give birth to one to two fawns per season. Notably, first-time mothers or those in their 2nd year of birthing tend to have singleton births, contributing to an average litter size of approximately 1.5.

Fawns are highly dependent on their mothers, staying close to them throughout the summer months. They gradually become more independent as they are weaned in the autumn, usually at the age of about six months. The familial structure during this period is typically a mother-and-fawn unit, while mature bucks generally keep to themselves or form small bachelor groups. Since young fawns are more susceptible to predators like mountain lions, bobcats, and coyotes, does care for the fawns by teaching them how to forage and avoid dangers, key survival skills that they will carry into their adulthood.

The buck's antlers fall off in the winter, and commence growing once more in spring in anticipation of next autumn's rut.

== Predation ==
Bobcats, mountain lions, coyotes, and American black bears are all common predators of California Mule Deer. Occasionally, these predators will hunt large healthy deer; however, these predators most often prey on weak, sick, or young deer or scavenge remains of dead deer.

== Disease and Parasites ==
The California mule deer often falls victim to the woodtick, which is extremely common throughout its habitat. Additionally lungworms and the nasal botfly will enter and parasitize the deer's lungs and nasal passageways. Parasitic eye worms of the genus Thelisa or Thelazia have also been found parasitizing the deer.

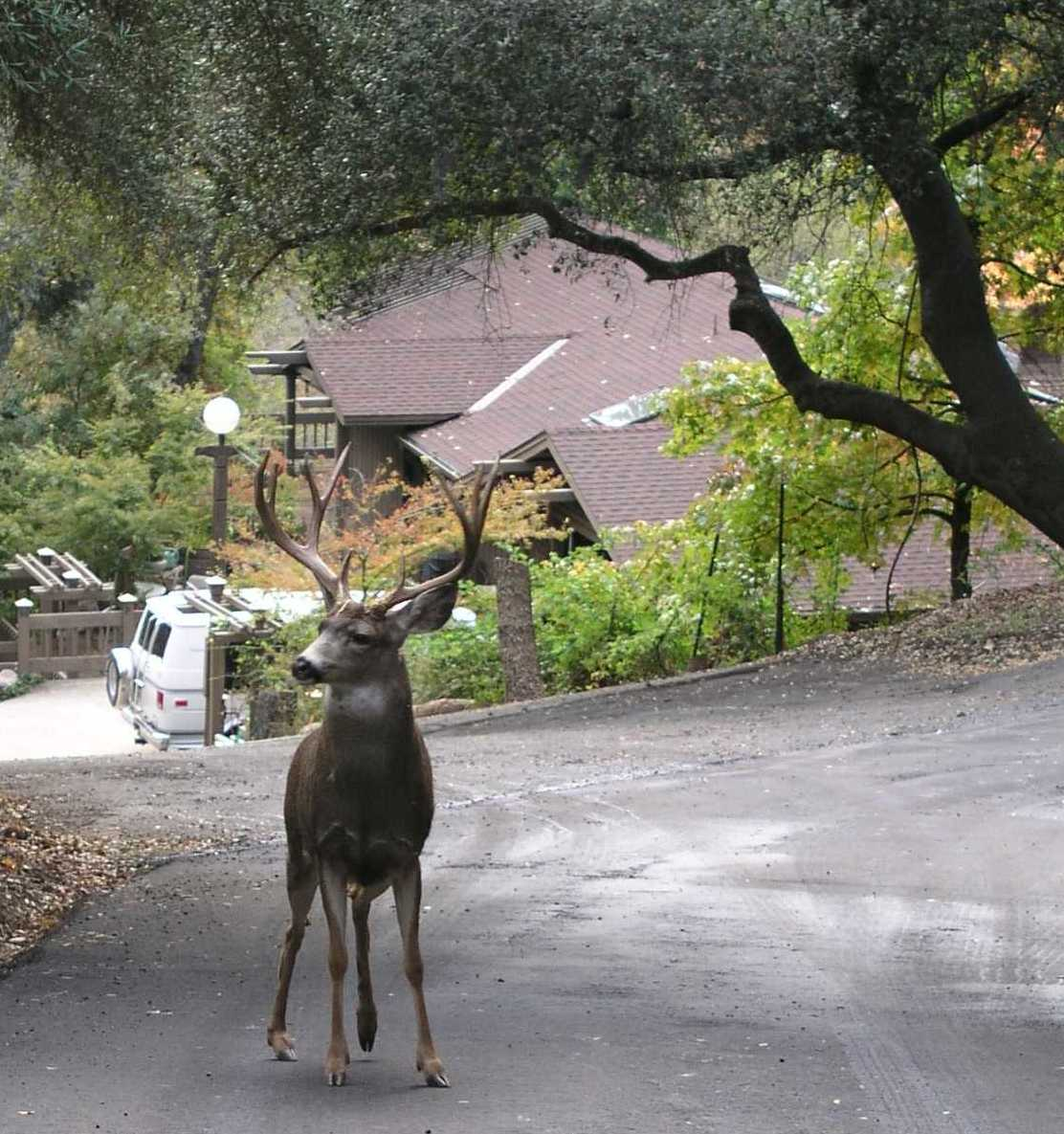
A buck during the rut in rural Auburn

== Human interactions ==
Since prehistoric times, the Native American indigenous peoples of California are known to have hunted California mule deer. Thus, since about 12,000 BCE, Gage suggests that human populations have served as a control to the numbers of California mule deer.

In the modern era, since European colonists and Euro-Americans settled in California, hunting pressure intensified as the human population expanded and hunting became an activity not just associated with food supply. In addition, human population growth (through urban development) in California has consumed large amounts of natural habitat of the California mule deer starting in the late 19th century and continuing through the present.
