= Rancho Cañada de San Felipe y Las Animas =

Mexican land grant in California

Coordinates: 37.200°N 121.640°W

Rancho Cañada de San Felipe y Las Animas was a 8,788-acre (35.56 km^{2}) Mexican land grant in present-day Santa Clara County, California, given in 1839 by Governor pro temp Manuel Jimeno to Thomas Bowen. The grant extended along San Felipe Creek and Las Animas Creek in the Diablo Range, north east of Morgan Hill. Much of the grant is now under the waters of Anderson Lake.

== History ==
Thomas Bowen (Tomas Boun) and Nathan Daly came to California in 1834 and received the two square league Rancho Cañada de San Felipe y Las Animas from Governor pro tem Manuel Jimeno Casarin in 1839.

Carl David Maria Weber (also known as Charles M. Weber I), born in what is now Germany, immigrated to America in 1836. He arrived in California with the Bartleson-Bidwell Party in 1841. Weber settled in the Pueblo of San José in 1842. He was a grantee of Rancho Campo de los Franceses. Captain Charles Weber took part, for the United States in the Mexican–American War, and in 1849 founded the city of Stockton. Weber acquired Rancho Cañada de San Felipe y Las Animas, which became known as the "Weber Ranch" and later managed by his son, Charles M. Weber II.

With the cession of California to the United States following the Mexican-American War, the 1848 Treaty of Guadalupe Hidalgo provided that the land grants would be honored. As required by the Land Act of 1851, a claim was filed with the Public Land Commission in 1852, and the grant was patented to Charles M. Weber in 1866.
