= Sport in Guernsey =

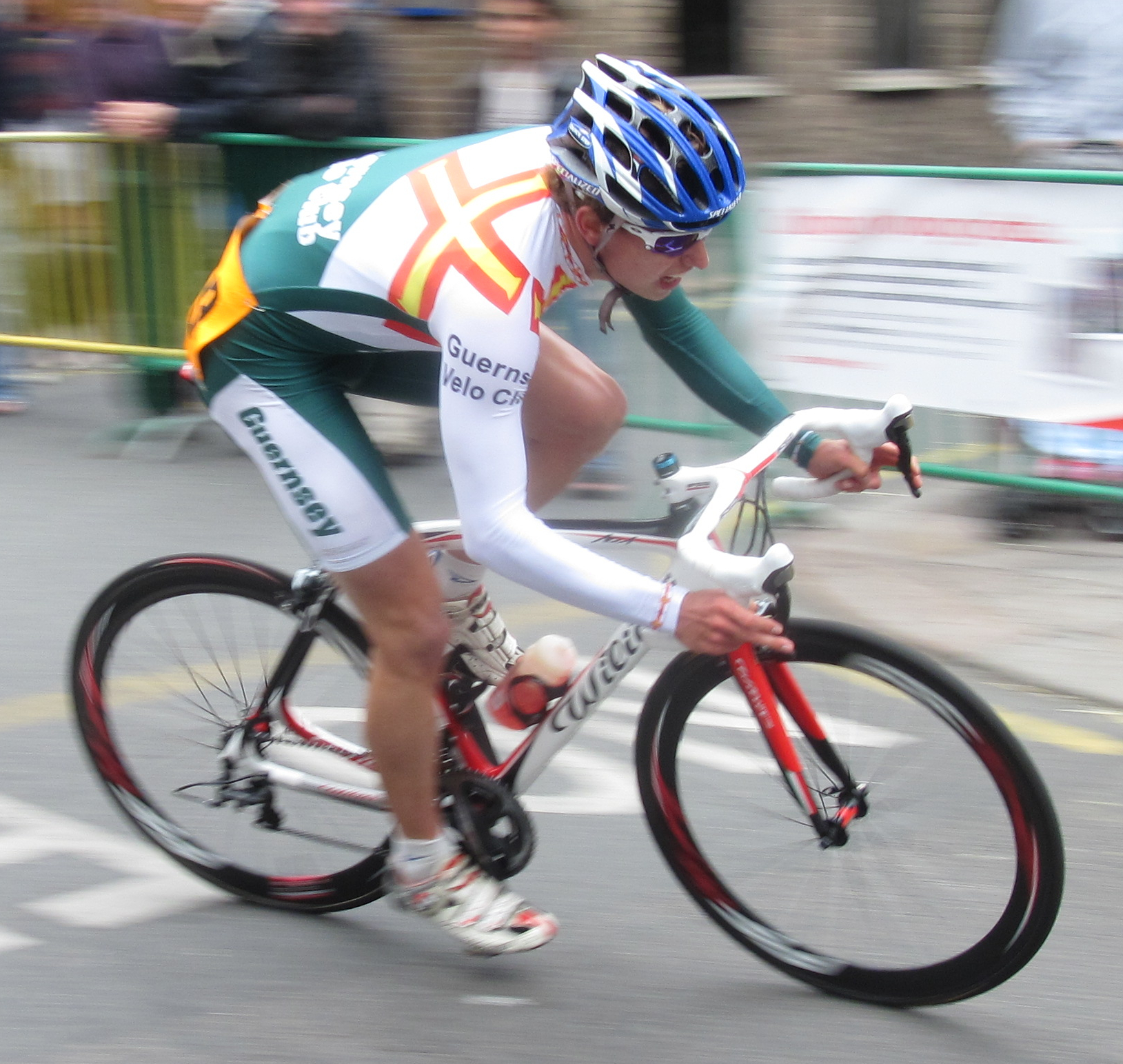
Joshua Gosselin racing for the Guernsey Velo Club, a cycling club in Guernsey

Guernsey participates in its own right in the Commonwealth Games.

Guernsey participates in the bi-annual Island Games, which it hosted in 1987, 2003 and 2023. In sporting events in which Guernsey does not have international representation, when the British Home Nations are competing separately, islanders that do have high athletic skill may choose to compete for any of the Home Nations – there are, however, restrictions on subsequent transfers to represent another Home Nation. The football player Matt Le Tissier for example, tried out for the Scotland national football team but ended up playing for England.

Major individual sports include athletics, shooting, swimming, football and fencing. Guernsey's home football team, Guernsey F.C. competes in the Isthmian League Division One South and Guernsey has received a number of Commonwealth games medals for shooting. Fencing is a sport that is rapidly increasing in popularity with GB fencers such as Fraser Ward originating from the island.

Sport in Guernsey is governed by the Guernsey Sports Commission with another association, Sport Guernsey developing elite athletes.

The island's sporting county is Hampshire.

The island's traditional colour (e.g. for sporting events) is green.

== Aikido ==
The Japanese martial art showing 'the way of spiritual harmony'

== Archery ==
Bowmen of Guernsey http://www.roversac.net/Archery.htm

Gold medals won at the Island Games

Island Games	Archery (gold)	
Event	Winner	Ref
Men's compound head-to-head	2003	
Women's recurve	Julie Nash 1999; Paula Rowland 2001; Chantelle Goubert 2015	
Women's recurve head-to-head	Lisa Gray 2015	
Women's compound	Terri Tough 2001	
Team compound head-to-head knockout	2011	

== Artistic Roller Skating ==
Islanders compete in the Guernsey Eisteddfod

== Association Football ==
The Guernsey Football Association runs Guernsey football. The top tier of Guernsey football is the FNB Priaulx League where there are 9 teams (Belgrave Wanderers, Northerners, Sylvans, St Martin's, Rovers, Guernsey Rangers, Vale Recreation, Mazur and Alderney). The current champions are Rovers. The second tier is the Jackson League which is a mixture of top league players, lower players and youth players. The third tier is the Railway League.

Guernsey teams can compete for the Guernsey FA Cup.

The Corbet Football Field donated by Jurat Wilfred Corbet OBE in 1932 has fostered the sport greatly over the years. Although more recently the island has upgraded to a larger, better quality stadium, called Footes Lane.

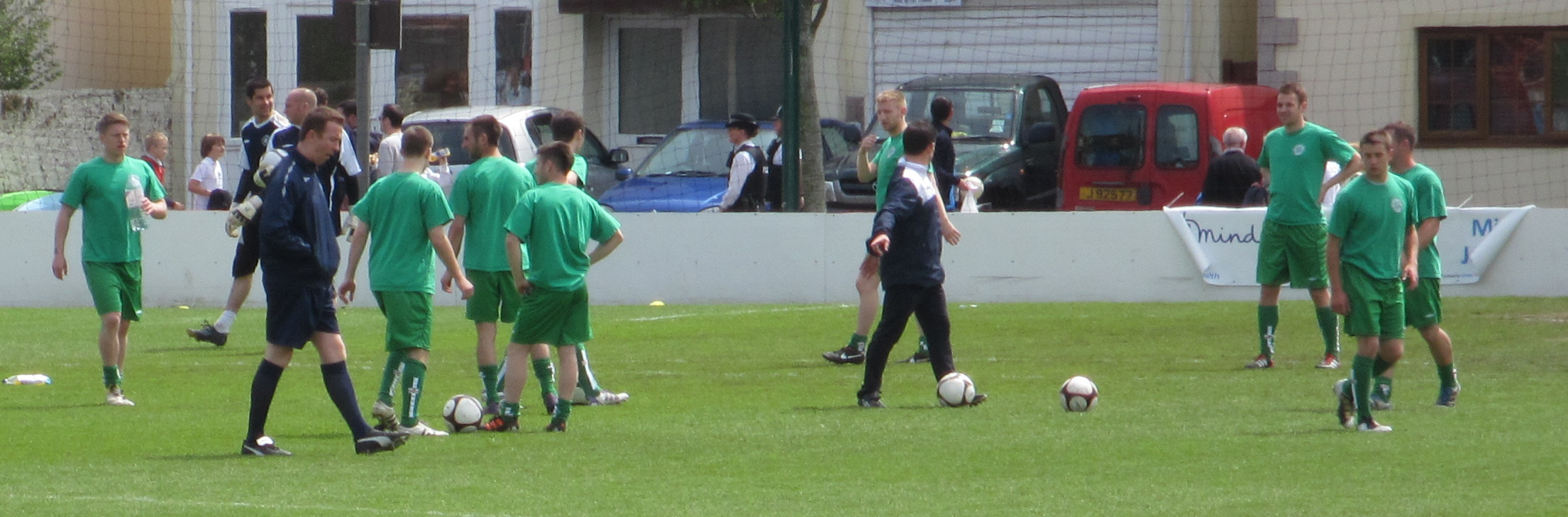
Guernsey footballers warm up before the 2012 Muratti final

The annual Muratti match between the Channel Islands gives an airing to the traditional rivalry between Guernsey and Jersey, Alderney also play either Guernsey or Jersey in the semi-final in Alderney.

In 2011, Guernsey F.C. was founded and became a member of the English Combined Counties Football League Division One, winning it in its inaugural season. earning promotion to the Combined Counties Football League Premier Division in 2012–13 and then promotion to the Isthmian League Division One South in 2013–14 which also gave entitlement to compete in the FA Cup.

Gold medals won at the Island Games

- Men 2001, 2003, 2015

see: Guernsey FA Guernsey FC

== Athletics ==
Using the all-weather track at Footes Lane, Guernsey athletes compete in a number of disciplines in Island Games and the Commonwealth Games.

Guernsey has produced several Olympians, Guernsey-born Percy Hodge competed for Great Britain at the 1920 Antwerp Olympics, winning gold in the 3000m Steeplechase. Dale Garland was a member of the Team GB 4x400m relay team at the 2008 Beijing Olympics, while Lee Merrien competed for Team GB in the Marathon at the 2012 London Olympics.

Gold Medals won at the Island Games include:

Island Games	Athletics – Men's (gold)	
Event	Winner	Ref
Men 100m	Ryan de Haaff 2003; Dale Garland 2005	
Men 400m	Dale Garland 2003, 2007; Tom Druce 2009, 2011; Cameron Chalmers 2015	
Men 800m	Tom Druce 2005, 2007, 2009	
Men 1,500m	Lee Merrien 2003, 2005, 2007, 2009	
Men 5,000m	Lee Merrien 2005, 2007, 2009	
Men 3,000m steeplechase	Lee Garland 1995, 2001, 2003, 2005	
Half Marathon	Alan Rowe 2003; Lee Merrien 2011, 2017	
Men 110m Hurdles	Dale Garland 2003, 2005; Glenn Etherington 2009, 2011	
Men 400m Hurdles	Dale Garland 2003; Sam Wallbridge 2013; Alastair Chalmers 2017	
Men Long Jump	Dale Garland 2003, 2005	

Island Games	Athletics – Women's (gold)	
Event	Winner	Ref
Women 100m	Kylie Robilliard 2011	
Women 200m	Hannah Lesbirel 2017	
Women 400m	Kimberley Goodall 2003, 2005, 2007	
Women 800m	Kimberley Goodall 2003	
Women 5,000m	Louise Perrio 2009, 2011; Sarah Mercier 2013, 2015	
Women 10,000m	Louise Perrio 2009, 2011, 2017	
Women Half Marathon	Penny Buckingham 2003; Louise Perrio 2017	
Women 100m Hurdles	Kylie Robilliard 2009	
Women Long Jump	Kimberley Goodall 2003, 2005	
Women High Jump	Erica Bodman 2003, 2005, 2007	
Women Hammer Throw	Emma King 2001	

Island Games	Athletics - Team (gold)	
Event	Winner	Ref
Men 4 × 100 m relay	2015	
Men 4 × 400 m relay	2003, 2005, 2007, 2009, 2011, 2015	
Men Half marathon Team	2003, 2011, 2015	
Women 4 × 100 m relay	2003, 2005, 2007, 2011	
Women 4 × 400 m relay	2003, 2005	
Women Half Marathon Team	2003, 2009	

see http://www.guernseyathletics.org.gg

== Badminton ==
Popular in Guernsey with players competing in the Commonwealth Games

Gold medals won at the Island Games:

Island Games	Badminton (gold)	
Event	Winner	Ref
Men's Singles	Mark Leadbeater; Jimmy McKenna; Glen MacFarlane 2001; Darren Le Tissier 2003; Paul Le Tocq 2013	
Women's singles	Sally Podger; Elena Johnson 2003, 2013	
Men's Doubles	2001, 2003	
Mixed Doubles	2001, 2003, 2011, 2017	
Women's Doubles	2003, 2009, 2011	
Team Event	2001, 2003, 2011, 2013, 2017	

see http://www.guernseybadminton.co.uk/

== Bar Billiards ==
A popular sport in Guernsey, the local association holds an annual Guernsey Open event

see: http://www.guernseybarbilliards.org.uk/

== Basketball ==
Islanders compete in and has won medals at Basketball at the Island Games

Gold medals won at the Island Games

- Women 2003

see http://guernseybasketball.co.uk

== Bell Ringing (Campanology) ==
With four ringable towers in Guernsey the Islanders form part of the Channel Islands district of Winchester and Portsmouth Diocesan Guild of Church Bell Ringers.

== Bowls ==
Indoor

Guernsey competes in the World Indoor Bowls Championships

- Winning World Indoor Women's Singles Champion in 1990 Fleur Bougard, 2009Alison Merrien MBE, 2011 Alison Merrien MBE
- Winning World Indoor Mixed Pairs Championship 2011 Alison Merrien MBE and Simon Skelton

and at the British Isles Indoor Bowls Championship

- Winning British Isles Indoor Women's Singles Championship 2002, 2006, 2008, 2009, 2012, 2015 Alison Merrien MBE
- Winning British Isles Indoor Women's Pairs Championship 2005, 2013, 2014, 2015 Alison Merrien MBE with Carol Ingrouille then Shirley Petit
- Winning British Isles Indoor Men's Triples Championship 2006
- Winning British Isles Indoor Women's Fours Championship 2001
- Winning British Isles Indoor Men's Fours Championship 2010

and the WIBC Championships

- Winning WIBC Indoor Ladies champion - Alison Merrien MBE 2009, 2015
- Winning WIBC Indoor Mixed Pairs Championship - Alison Merrien MBE 2001, 2004

Gold medals won at the Island Games include:

Island Games	Bowls (gold)	
Event	Winner	Ref
Men's Singles	Paul Ingrouille 2005	
Men's Pairs	2005	
Men's Fours	2005	
Men's Team Event	2005	
Women's Singles	Alison Merrien 2005	
Women's Four's	2005	
Women's Team Event	2005	

Lawn

Medals won at the Commonwealth Games

- Silver 1986 Lawn Bowls Women's Doubles - Jennifer "Jennie" Nicolle and Marie Smith

== Boxing ==
Organised by the Amalgamated Boys Club since 1936, the sport has been strong in Guernsey for over 100 years.

Ladies are also training and competing in competitions.

== Canoeing and Sea Kayaking ==
A sport that has been increasing in popularity over recent years as equipment quality has increased.

see: http://guernseycanoeclub.com/file/Home.html

== Chess ==
With divisions, knock-out competitions, an annual open international chess festival and with teams representing the Island at International competitions and the Chess Olympiad, you could say chess is a popular sport in the island.

See: http://www.guernseychessclub.org.gg/

== Cheerleaders ==
For 4- to 27-year-old boys and girls, they perform at special local Guernsey events and UK competitions.

== Cricket ==
Guernsey was declared an affiliate member by the International Cricket Council (ICC) in 2005. Competing in the World Cricket League, having won promotion to 2016 ICC World Cricket League Division Five

There is a Channel Islands League in which Guernsey teams participate as well as an annual Inter-insular match against Jersey

Guernsey cricket team competing in the 2015 ICC Europe Division One of Twenty20 having won promotion from Division Two in 2010

From 2016, Guernsey is playing limited matches in Division 2 of the Sussex Cricket League after Sussex clubs voted unanimously to allow the island to join the competition.

According to the ICC, "Guernsey is believed to have the highest cricket participation rate per capita with around 3,000 (circa 5%) of the island's entire population playing the game either as adults in league cricket or as youngsters in the school system".

see http://www.guernseycricket.com/

== Cycling ==
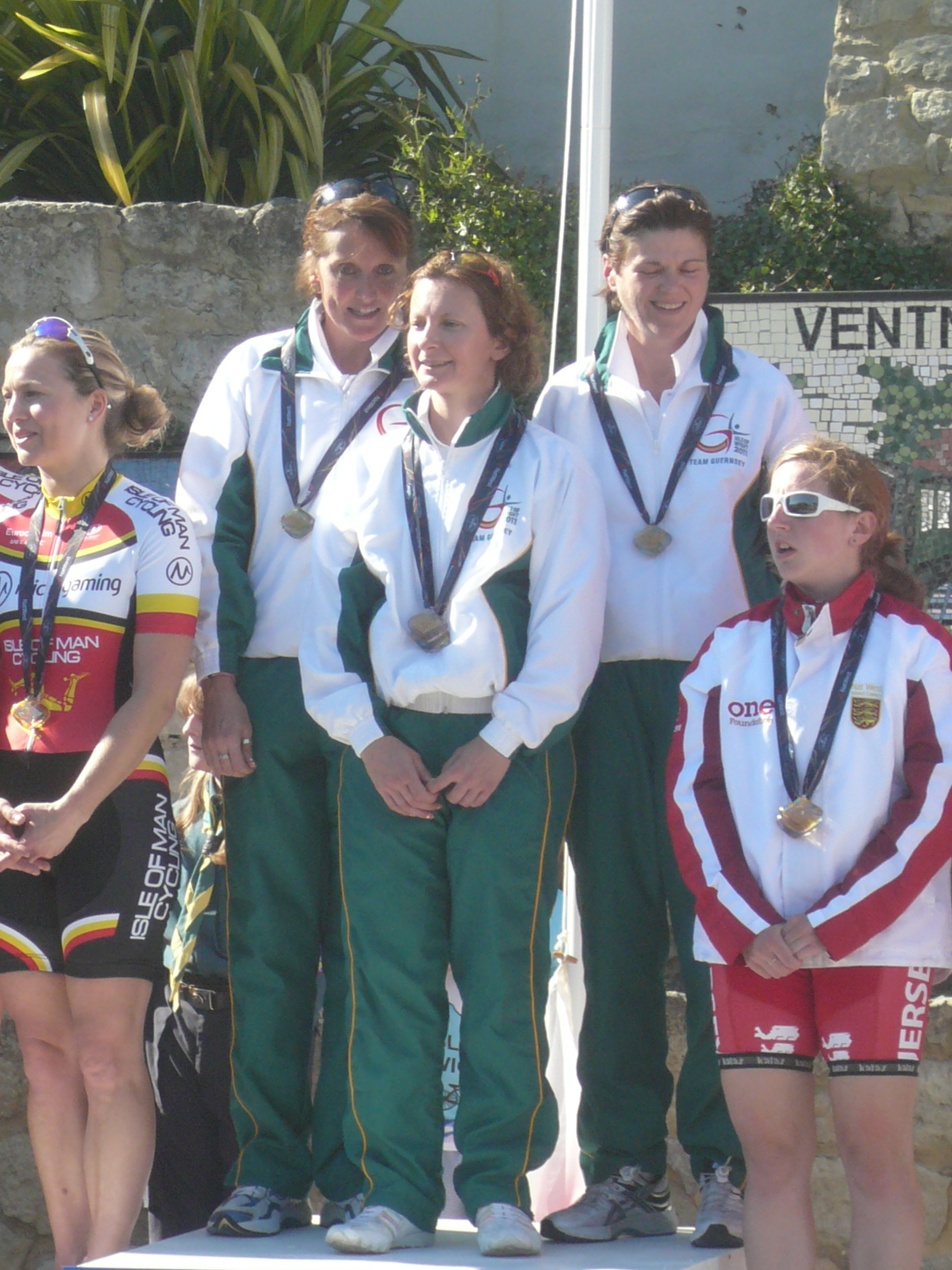
Island Games 2011: Guernsey women's team Town Centre Criterium cycling gold medal winners

Cycling is very popular in Guernsey with Velo Club races throughout the year, including an annual inter insular event.

Guernsey cyclists compete in GHS UK events, the Island Games and the Commonwealth Games

Gold medals won at the Island Games include:

Island Games	Cycling - Individual (gold)	
Event	Winner	Ref
Men's Individual Town Centre Criterium	Tobyn Horton 2007, 2011, 2013	
Men's Individual Road Race	Tobyn Horton 2013	
Men's Mountain Bike Cross Country	Rob Smart 2011; James Roe 2017	
Men's Mountain Bike Criterium	Rob Smart 2011	
Women's Individual 25 km Time Trial	Ann Bowditch 2001	
Women's Individual Time Trial	Ann Bowditch 2003, 2013	
Women's Town Centre Criterion	Ann Bowditch 2003, 2011, 2013	
Women's Individual Mountain Bike Criterium	Ann Bowditch 2003; Meggie Bichard 2007	
Women's Individual Mountain Bike Cross Country	Ann Bowditch 2003; Meggie Bichard 2007	

Island Games	Cycling - Team (gold)	
Event	Winner	Ref
Men's Team Road Race	2013	
Men's Team Mountain Bike Cross Country	2003, 2011, 2013	
Women's Time Trial Team Event	2011, 2013, 2017	
Women's Team Town Centre Criterium	2011	

see http://www.gvc.gg/

For more relaxed cycling, there are regular charity cycling events, such as "Rock To Rocque", and the States of Guernsey promote cycle routes through the country parishes.

== Dance ==
Many types of dance are undertaken, including:

- Argentine Tango
- Ballet
- Ballroom
- Burlesque
- Charleston
- Guernsey traditional
- Irish
- Latin American
- Modern
- Morris
- Pole
- Salsa
- Scottish
- Street
- Tap
- Zumba

With dance festivals and competitions organised by dance schools.

See: - Dance

== Darts ==
It is a popular sport in Guernsey for men and women, with several leagues and inter-island competitions organised.

See: http://www.guernseydarts.com/

== Disability sports ==
Guernsey Sports Association for the Disabled offer general sports aimed at people with a variety of abilities across different ages with an annual participation in a UK Disability Games competition.

== Equestrian ==
Including:

- Show jumping
- Pony club
- Horse driving
- Riding and hunting

with some events held at the annual West Show.

See: http://www.bsguernsey.co.uk/

== Euchre ==
With divisions, leagues and knock out competitions, this card game is played by many in Guernsey locations.

see: http://guernseyeuchre.com

== Fencing ==
Guernsey is renowned for its strong fencing ability. The island competes at a number of levels, competing in national competitions all the way up to the Commonwealths. Guernsey has won two medals at Commonwealth Junior level. GB Fencers such as Fraser Ward are from Guernsey.

see: http://www.guernseyfencing.com/

== Fishing ==
Sea fishing from the shore and boats is very popular, with a number of British records being held with fish caught in Bailiwick waters.

== Five-a-Side football ==
It is regularly played at Beau Sejour.

== 6-a-side football ==
Guernsey has a Wednesday league.

see: Wednesday League

== Futsal football ==
The Brazilian game is proving popular in Guernsey, where soccer skills can be improved with this indoor 5-a-side team sport.

see: http://www.icg.gg/sports/futsal-football

== Gaelic Football ==
The Guernsey Gaels was founded in 1996 and competes in the European Gaelic football leagues. The island hosts its own tournament each year, with teams from all over Europe visiting the island.

Guernsey became European Gaelic Football Champions in 2011.

see: https://www.facebook.com/groups/78377631839/

== Geocaching ==
A fairly new world sport, with lots of objects to find in Guernsey

see: http://www.geocaching.com/

== Golf ==
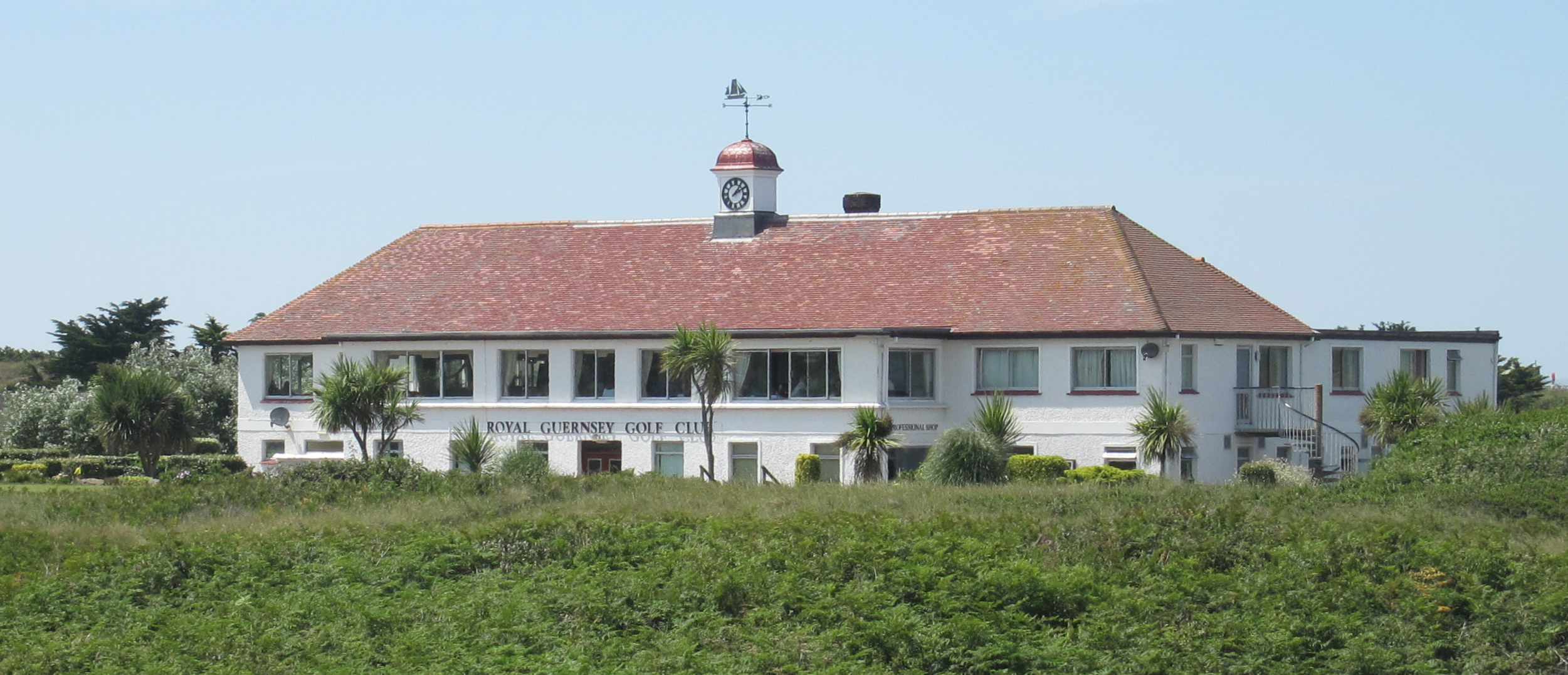
Royal Guernsey Golf Club

There are two 18-hole courses and one 9-hole course in the island, with a nine-hole course in Alderney.

Juniors are encouraged with competitions and cups to play for.

Islanders and clubs compete in inter Island competitions in both Jersey and Alderney, in the Island Games and in Hampshire and other English competitions.

Gold medals in the Island Games include:

Island Games	Golf (gold)	
Event	Winner	Ref
Men's Individual	Robert Eggo 1991, 2003	
Women's Individual	Aimee Ponte 2015	
Men's team event	2003	
Ladies Team Event	2013	

== Hockey ==
Actively played by men and women, who compete in English knockout competitions. There are also annual inter-island games.

The men's team won the England Hockey Trophy in 2008–09, and were runners-up in 2011–12 and 2012–13 before winning again in 2013–14.

The women's team won the England Hockey Vase in 2012–13, having been runners-up in 2010–11.

see http://www.guernseyhockey.com/

== Horse racing ==
The racecourse on L'Ancresse Common was re-established in 2004, and races are held on most Bank Holidays, with competitors from Guernsey as well as Jersey, France and the UK participating.

== Judo ==
Guernsey competes in the Island Games

Gold medals won in Island Games include:

- Men's 73 kg - Roberto Mascherucci 2007

Mitch Agnelli won the World Veterans Judo Championship in Amsterdam in the over 75-80 under 81 kg category, in 2015.

In 2016 Louis Plevin won gold in the under 81 kg English Junior Open.

see http://guernseyjudo.com/

== Modern Pentathlon ==
Modern Pentathlon is a relatively new sport for Guernsey however the island is extremely strong in all of its individual disciplines.

see https://web.archive.org/web/20160422035310/http://www.pentathlon.org.gg/

== Motor Sports ==
Guernsey also enjoys various motor sports covering production cars, sports cars, racing cars, motor cycles, motorcycles with sidecars, quad bikes, karts and historic cars and bikes

- Off Road
- Motor Cycle Trials
- Sprints
- Hill climbs

In season, regular races take place on the sands on Vazon beach on the west coast including the British Sand Ace Championship

Le Val des Terres, a steeply winding road rising south from St Peter Port to Fort George, is often the focus of both local and international hill-climb races.

Zef Eisenberg set the ACU British Land Speed Record in 2012 and with the Mad Max racing team set the World Turbine Bike Record with a speed of 233.7 mph in 2015.

The 2005, 2006, and 2007 World Touring Car Champion Andy Priaulx is a Guernseyman, whilst his son Seb currently competes in Formula 4.

see:

- Guernsey Motor Cycle & Car Club LBG
- Guernsey Kart & Motor Club

== Mountaineering ==
An unusual sport for Guernsey, but Andrew May made it to the top of Everest in May 2013.

== Netball ==
With three divisions of teams, netball has been a popular sport in the Island for over 70 years.

Guernsey Panthers pay in England in Division Two South.

An annual competition against Jersey is played towards the end of the season.

see Guernsey Netball

== Petanque ==
The traditional French game is also popular in Guernsey.

With an annual Guernsey Open competition held at the Petanque centre.

see: Guernsey Petanque

== Power Boating ==
Guernsey has had World Offshore Power Boating competitors. Local power boating races for rigid hulls and ribs are regularly held

UIM 2014 class 3A and 3B World Powerboat Championships will be held in Guernsey

Guernsey power boater Peter Wilson has held British Water Speed records for IIIB 1.3 litre

see: Guernsey Powerboat Association

== Rowing ==
Since 1894 Men's and Women's teams have been competing in local open sea races, with singles, pairs and fours.

Inter Island races, including the popular Sark to Jersey race and international coastal races and regattas.

In 1997 Jon Van Katwyk and Geoff Gavey completed the inaugural Atlantic Rowing Race.

In 2005-6 Lois Rawlins-Duquemin, Sarah Day, Kathy Tracey and Paula Van Katwyk was the first all female crew to row an ocean, crossing the atlantic in 67-7-20

In 2008, Sam De Kooker and Simon Johns established a Guinness World Record for rowing non-stop on an indoor rowing machine in support of Multiple Sclerosis. They achieved a distance of over 300,000 metres.

In 2009 Margi Jorgensen won a silver medal in the ladies single in the World Coastal Rowing Championships.

In 2013 James Plumley was part of the "Islanders" rowing team who broke the world record for rowing 2,000 miles around the British coast in a time of 26-9-9-58.

see: Guernsey Rowing Club

== Rugby Union ==
Guernsey RFC was founded in 1928 (GRUFC) and competes in the English leagues. Guernsey players are eligible for inclusion in the Hampshire Rugby Football Union County team who compete for the County Championship Shield

Guernsey RFC 2nd XV and the only one other senior team in Guernsey, St. Jacques RUFC, which was founded in 1978, compete in the Jersey League.

Guernsey competes for the Siam Cup annually against Jersey. The trophy awarded its winner is the second oldest rugby honour contested in the world after the Calcutta Cup.

Guernsey Ladies Rugby have competed in the English non-contact leagues since the 2014–15 season.

see: GRFC

== Running ==
Marathons have been run in the island for over 100 years, there is an annual marathon together with a number of half marathons and shorter runs organised annually. There is an annual ultramarathon which follows the coast of the island for 36 miles. The Easter running festival is also popular with its cross-country course.

Athletes also compete within and for Hampshire County. Charity running events are well represented.

Hash House Harriers, Hash House Harriets, and Guernsey Full Moon HHH events add to the fun of the sport. A weekly 5 km Parkrun event takes place on Saturday mornings at Pembroke Bay.

Mike Meinke completed the 156 mile Marathon des Sables across the Sahara in 2013, starting a trend with three local runners completing the course in the 2014 race and three more in the 2015 race. A Guernsey woman, Ali Moullin competing in 2017.

see: Guernsey hhharriettes
see: parkrun

== Sailing ==
Dingy and yacht racing are popular in Guernsey. Sailors compete in Island Games

Gold Medals won at the Island Games include:

Island Games	Sailing (gold)	
Event	Winner	Ref
Laser Radial Rig	Michael Henning 2001	
Laser Standard Rig	Barney Chandler 2003	
Sailing Team Event	2001, 2003	

see: http://www.gyc.org.gg/ Sailing Trust

== Shooting ==
Shooters regularly compete at National Rifle Association of the United Kingdom ranges at Bisley and in the Island Games and the Commonwealth Games and have represented Great Britain at the Olympics.

Gold medals won at the Island Games include:

Island Games	Shooting (gold)	
Event	Winner	Ref
Men's ISSF 10m Air Pistol	2003	
Men's ISSF 10m Pair Air Pistol	2003	
Men's ISSF 10m Air Rifle	Paul Gillou 2015	
Men's ISSF 25m Centrefire	Jacek Hanca 2015	
Men's NPA Service Pistol B	Andy Torode 2001	
Open Service Pistol B	Andy Torode 2015	
ISSF Open Skeet	2003	
Women's ISSF 10m Air Pistol	Teresa Roland 2001, 2003, 2011	
Women's ISSF 10m Pair Air Pistol	2003, 2005	
Women's ISSF 25m Standard Pistol	Nikki Trebert 2007, 2017	
Women's Olympic Trap Individual	Marlene Place 2007	
NPA Service Pistol B	2001, 2003	
Police Pistol 1	2001, 2015	
Police Pistol 2	2001, 2015	
Women's ISSF 10m Air Pistol Team	2011, 2013	
Women's ISSF 25m Sport Pistol Team	2013	

Medals won at the Commonwealth Games

- Gold 1990 Rapid Fire Pistol - Men - Adrian Breton
- Silver 1982 Shooting Men's Air Rifle - Matthew Guille
- Silver 1986 Shooting Men's Rapid Fire Pistol - Adrian Breton
- Bronze 1982 Shooting Fullbore Rifle Queen's Prize Open - Charles Trotter
- Bronze 1994 Shooting Men's Rapid Fire Pistol Team - Adrian Breton and Graham le Maitre

National Rifle Association

- QUEENS Prize Gold Badge for first place 1899 - Private William A Priaulx
- QUEENS Prize Gold Badge for first place 1975 - Charles MY Trotter
- Grand Aggregate Silver Cross for second place 2008 - Nicholas C Mace

== Skateboarding ==
Introduced to Guernsey in the 1960s, a new park built in 2013 at Beau Sejour attracts many new participants

Guernsey Extreme Sports Association organises pro riders and skaters events

== Skittles ==
With three divisions of leagues, it has been a popular sport in Guernsey for many years, played at the Hampshire Lodge.

see: Sarnia Skittles

== Snooker & Billiards ==
Guernsey Snooker run four team leagues, three individual leagues, knockouts and annual Open Competitions for both Snooker and Billiards.

Inter-insular competitions also take place.

see: Guernsey Snooker

== Softball ==
Two divisions of teams with an Inter Island competition at the end of each season.

Guernsey Softball Association see Guernsey Softball

== Squash ==
Guernsey holds a Guernsey Open Championship annually.

Guernsey's Chris Simpson is a world ranked squash player.

Guernsey players compete in the Island Games, the Commonwealth Games and from 2017 in the European Team Championships Div 3

Gold medals won in Island Games include

- Men Singles - Chris Simpson 2005
- Women's Doubles - 2005

== Surfing ==
Surfing at Vazon beach on Guernsey's west coast has been a popular sport for many years.

Johnny Wallbridge coming first in the seniors division of 2015 Magic Seaweed British National Surf Championships.

see: http://www.guernseysurfclub.com/

== Swimming ==
Water based sports, both sea and pool based are popular, with many Islanders competing in the annual Charity Swimarathon and competitively in the Island Games and Commonwealth Games

Gold Medals won at the Island Games include:

Island Games	Swimming – Men's (gold)	
Event	Winner	Ref
Men's 50m Backstroke	Thomas Hollingsworth 2005; Ian Powell 2011, 2015	
Men's 50m Breaststroke	Matthew Robert 2005	
Men's 50m Freestyle	Miles Munro 2015, 2017	
Men's 100m Backstroke	Ian Powell 2011; Thomas Hollingsworth 2005, 2015, 2017	
Men's 100m Butterfly	Ben Lowndes 2009; Ian Powell 2011; Thomas Hollingsworth 2017	
Men's 100m Freestyle	Jeremy Osborne 2007; Miles Munro 2017	
Men's 100m Individual Medley	Ben Lowndes 2007, 2009; Thomas Hollingsworth 2005, 2011	
Men's 200m Backstroke	Ian Powell 2003, 2005, 2011; Thomas Hollingsworth 2017	
Men's 200m Butterfly	Ben Lowndes 2009, Ian Powell 2011	
Men's 200m Freestyle	Jonathan Le Noury 2005	
Men's 200m Individual Medley	Ian Powell 2003; Jeremy Osborne 2007; Thomas Hollingsworth 2005, 2011	
Men's 400m Freestyle	Jonathan Le Noury 2005	
Men's 200m Individual Medley	Ian Powell 2003; Jeremy Osborne 2007; Thomas Hollingsworth 2005, 2011	

Island Games	Swimming – Women's (gold)	
Event	Winner	Ref
Women's 50m Breaststroke	Jennifer Salmon 2005	
Women's 50m Butterfly	Kristina Neves 2011	
Women's 50m Freestyle	Gail Strowbridge 2005	
Women's 100m Backstroke	Courtney Butcher 2015	
Women's 100m Breaststroke	Gail Strowbridge 2003, 2005	
Women's 100m Butterfly	Robyn Le Friec 2009; Kristina Neves 2011	
Women's 100m Freestyle	Gail Strowbridge 2003	
Women's 200m Backstroke	Courtney Butcher 2015	
Women's 200m Breaststroke	Gail Strowbridge 2003, 2005	
Women's 200m Butterfly	Kristina Neves 2011	
Women's 200m Freestyle	Gail Strowbridge 2003; Kristina Neves 2011	
Women's 400m Freestyle	Kristina Neves 2011	
Women's 400m Individual Medley	Gail Strowbridge 2003	
Women's 800m Freestyle	Kristina Neves 2011	

Island Games	Swimming - Team (gold)	
Event	Winner	Ref
Men's 4 x 50m Freestyle Relay	2009, 2013, 2015, 2017	
Men's 4 x 50m Medley Relay	2011, 2013, 2017	
Men's 4 × 100 m Freestyle Relay	2007, 2009, 2015, 2017	
Men's 4 × 100 m Medley Relay	2009, 2011, 2013	
Mixed 4 x 50m Freestyle Relay	2005, 2013, 2017	
Women's 4 × 100 m Freestyle Relay	2003, 2005	
Women's 4 x 50 m Freestyle Relay	2017	

see http://www.gasa.org.gg/

== Table Tennis ==
Member of the European Table Tennis Union

The GTTA centre, located next to the Hougue du Pommier, is equipped with 12 match tables, 6 training tables, a bar and a small café area.

Guernsey teams compete in UK leagues and in Island Games and the Commonwealth Games

Gold medals won in the Island Games include:

Island Games	Table Tennis (gold)	
Event	Winner	Ref
Men's Doubles	2011	
Women's Singles	Alice Loveridge 2007, 2011, 2015	
Women's Doubles	2003, 2007, 2011, 2015	
Mixed Doubles	2011	
Team Event	2005, 2011, 2015, 2017	

see http://www.gtta.org.uk/

== Tag Rugby ==
This non contact sport is played by men and women of all ages, with all primary schools participating in the sport.

see: http://www.tryrugby.gg/index.php/tag_rugby/

== Tennis ==
As Guernsey has the second oldest tennis club in the world, at Kings, with courts built in 1875, you would be quite correct in saying that Tennis is a sport Guernsey loves.

With six indoor and outdoor facilities at a number of locations, clubs are associated to the Lawn Tennis Association

Guernsey's Heather Watson is a world ranked tennis player and WTA title holder. Competing for Team GB in the 2012 and 2016 Olympic Games, and winning Wimbledon Mixed Doubles in 2016

Guernsey players compete in the Island Games and Commonwealth Games as well as playing Inter Island games against Jersey and competing in Channel Island Teams in Aegon County Cup summer and winter events.

Gold medals won in the Island Games include:

Island Games	Tennis (gold)	
Event	Winner	Ref
Men's Doubles	2009	
Men's Team	2007, 2009, 2013	
Mixed Doubles	2015	
Women's Singles	Ella Taylor 2015	
Women's Doubles	2003	
Women's Team	2015	

== Tenpin Bowling ==
With leagues for men and women, organised by the Guernsey Tenpin Bowling Association

Guernsey has competed tenpin bowling at the Island Games

== Touch Football (Rugby league) ==
Men's Women's and Mixed teams competing in leagues, an annual Inter Island competition, and the Island competes in Touch Europe and the Touch Football World Cup

In 2011 Guernsey won the World Cup Mixed Open Bowl Trophy having beaten the US in the final.

see: http://guernseytouch.org.gg/

== Triathlon ==
Guernsey participants compete in a number of events including the Island Games and Commonwealth Games

Gold medals won in the Island Games include:

- Women's Tournament - Sam Herridge 2007
- Women's Team 2007

see http://www.guernseytriathlon.com/

== Volleyball ==
With leagues for Men and Women and a Mixed League, as well as an annual Guernsey Open Competition and inter-insular against Jersey.

see: http://volleyballguernsey.com/

== Walking ==
Sarnia Walking Club hold events throughout the year for men and women covering many different distances.

The annual church-to-church competition, where competitors have to touch each parish church in a 19.4 mile race is a special Guernsey event attracting world class competitors. This race has been walked for well over 70 years, although if you believe the Guppy 'Stone de Croze' cartoons, its more like 7,000 years.

Guernsey competitors also compete in English Race Walking Association events and the 20 km walk in the Commonwealth Games.

Annual charity walks also take place including a round the Island race.

== Water Polo ==
Used to be played in Saint Peter Port harbour, but nowadays in pools, such as at St Sampson's school.

Inter insular matches are held regularly.

== Windsurfing/Sailboarding ==
Guernsey's west coast provides good facilities for keen windsurfers. Island competitors have entered International Formula Windsurfing Class events.

Gold medals won at the Island Games include:

Island Games	Sailboarding (gold)	
Event	Winner	Ref
Individual	Mike Birch 1993; James Briggs 2005	
Long distance individual	2005	
Team Event	1993, 1995, 1997, 2015	

see http://www.gbsa.org.gg/

== See also ==
- Guernsey at the Commonwealth Games
- Island Games
- Sport in the United Kingdom
- Sport in Jersey
- Sport in Alderney
- Guernsey Sports
