= Bowls at the Island Games =

Sporting event

Bowls have been part of the Island Games events on three occasions since their introduction in 1987. If the host nation chooses to include bowls as an event, they have the option of one of indoor bowls, outdoor bowls or ten pin bowling.

Indoor bowls were part of the 1987 and 2005 Games, whilst ten-pin bowling was part of the 1999 Games and is on the list of prospective events for the 2019 Games. To date, no outdoor bowls competition has been held at an Island Games.

Medals are awarded in both individual and team competitions, with varying number of medal events between the games. Each island to submit one competitor/team for each medal event.

== Events ==
Event		II 1987	III	IV	V	VI	VII	VIII 1999	IX	X	XI 2005	XII	XIII	XIV	XV	XVI	XVII	XVIII 2019	XIX 2023
Indoor bowls
Indoor bowls	Singles	X	No bowls events held								X	No bowls events held							X
Indoor bowls	Pairs	X	No bowls events held								X	No bowls events held							X
Indoor bowls	Triples		No bowls events held									No bowls events held							X
Indoor bowls	Fours		No bowls events held								X	No bowls events held							
Indoor bowls	Team	X	No bowls events held								X	No bowls events held							
Ten pin bowling
Ten pin bowling	Singles							X										X	
Ten pin bowling	Team							X										X	

== Indoor bowls ==
=== Top medalists ===
	Gold Medals		Total Medals	
	No:	Team	No:	Team
Singles	5	Guernsey	7; 3	Guernsey; Isle of Man Jersey Shetland
Pairs	4	Guernsey	7; 6	Guernsey; Jersey
Triples and Fours	3	Guernsey	4; 3	Guernsey; Jersey
Team	3	Guernsey	4; 3	Guernsey; Jersey Isle of Man

=== Singles ===
Year	Games	Host	Event				
Year	Games	Host	Event	Gold	Silver	Bronze	Bronze
1987	II	Guernsey	Men; Women	M Nicoll Guernsey; J Nicoll Guernsey	Guernsey; Isle of Man	Shetland; Jersey	
2005	XI	Shetland	Men; Women	Paul Ingrouille Guernsey; Alison Merrien Guernsey	Isle of Man; Isle of Wight	Jersey; Isle of Man	Shetland; Shetland
2023	XIX	Guernsey	Open	Alison Merrien Guernsey	Guernsey	Bermuda	Jersey

=== Pairs ===
Year	Games	Host	Event				
Year	Games	Host	Event	Gold	Silver	Bronze	Bronze
1987	II	Guernsey	Men; Women	Guernsey; Guernsey	Jersey; Jersey	Shetland; Guernsey	
2005	XI	Shetland	Men; Women	Guernsey; Shetland	Isle of Man; Guernsey	Jersey; Alderney	Shetland; Jersey
2023	XIX	Guernsey	Open	Guernsey	Guernsey	Jersey	Jersey

=== Triples ===
Year	Games	Host	Event				
Year	Games	Host	Event	Gold	Silver	Bronze	Bronze
2023	XIX	Guernsey	Open	Guernsey	Falkland Islands	Jersey	Guernsey

=== Fours ===
Year	Games	Host	Event				
Year	Games	Host	Event	Gold	Silver	Bronze	Bronze
2005	XI	Shetland	Men; Women	Guernsey; Guernsey	Jersey; Isle of Wight	Isle of Man; Jersey	Shetland; Shetland

=== Team ===
Year	Games	Host	Event			
Year	Games	Host	Event	Gold	Silver	Bronze
1987	II	Guernsey	Men; Women	Guernsey; Jersey	Jersey; Guernsey	Isle of Man; Isle of Man
2005	XI	Shetland	Men; Women	Guernsey; Guernsey	Isle of Man; Shetland	Jersey; Isle of Wight

== Ten pin bowling ==
=== Top medalists ===
	Gold Medals		Total Medals	
	No:	Team	No:	Team
Men's	4	Åland Islands	9; 6	Åland; Bermuda
Women's	6	Gotland	11; 7	Gotland; Åland Islands

=== Men's results ===
Year	Games	Host	Event			
Year	Games	Host	Event	Gold	Silver	Bronze
1999	VIII	Gotland	Singles; Team	Gotland; Gotland	Åland; IOM	Åland; Guernsey
2019	XVIII	Gibraltar	Singles; Doubles; Team; Mixed; Masters	Gotland; Åland; Åland; Åland; Åland	Bermuda; Åland; Bermuda; Bermuda; Bermuda	Åland; Bermuda; Gotland; Åland; Bermuda

=== Women's results ===
Year	Games	Host	Event			
Year	Games	Host	Event	Gold	Silver	Bronze
1999	VIII	Gotland	Singles; Team	Gotland; Gotland	Gotland; Åland	Gotland; Jersey
2019	XVIII	Gibraltar	Singles; Doubles; Team; Mixed; Masters	Gotland; Gotland; Gotland; Åland; Gotland	Åland; Åland; Åland; Bermuda; Åland	Gotland; Gotland; Bermuda; Åland; Gotland
