= Table tennis at the Island Games =

Table Tennis is an event at the Island Games, the biennial multi-sports event for island nations, territories and dependencies.

Table Tennis was first included in the Island Games in 1987. Table Tennis is not always chosen as a sport in the games.

- Men's and Women's Singles - a maximum of 4 competitors per Member Island
- Men's and Women's Doubles - a maximum of 2 pairs per Member Island
- Mixed Doubles - a maximum of 4 competitors per Member Island
- Team per Member Island consisting of:

Men Maximum of 4 and a minimum of 2 competitors
Women Maximum of 4 and a minimum of 1 competitor

- Age - minimum 13

== Events ==
Event	II 1987	III 1989	IV 1991	V 1993	VI 1995	VII 1997	VIII 1999	IX 2001	X 2003	XI 2005	XII 2007	XIII 2009	XIV 2011	XV 2013	XVI 2015	XVII 2017	XVIII 2019	XIX 2023
Men's singles	X	X	X	X	X	X	X	X	X	X	X	X	X	X	X	X	X	X
Women's singles	X	X	X	X	X	X	X	X	X	X	X	X	X	X	X	X	X	X
Men's doubles		X	X	X	X	X	X	X	X	X	X	X	X	X	X	X	X	X
Women's doubles		X	X	X	X	X	X	X	X	X	X	X	X	X	X	X	X	X
Mixed doubles		X	X	X	X	X	X	X	X	X	X	X	X	X	X	X	X	X
Team event	X	X	X	X	X	X	X	X	X	X	X	X	X	X	X	X	X	X

== Top Medalists ==
	Gold Medals		Total Medals	
	No:	Team	No:	Team
Men's singles	8; 5	Gotland; Isle of Wight	31; 7	Gotland; Isle of Wight
Men's doubles	6; 4	Gotland; Isle of Wight	18; 11	Gotland; Jersey
Women's singles	8; 3	Gotland; Guernsey Isle of Wight	22; 15	Gotland; Guernsey
Women's doubles	9; 5	Gotland; Guernsey	17; 14	Gotland; Guernsey
Mixed doubles	5	Gotland Isle of Wight	22; 11	Gotland; Guernsey
Team Event	7; 5	Gotland; Guernsey	15; 11	Gotland; Guernsey

== Men's singles ==
Year	Games	Host				
Year	Games	Host	Gold	Silver	Bronze	Bronze
1987	II	Guernsey	Gotland	Gotland	Gotland	Isle of Man
1989	III	Faroe Islands	Gotland	Gotland	Gotland	
1991	IV	Åland	Gotland	Gotland	Gotland	
1993	V	Isle of Wight	Gotland	Gotland	Gotland	
1995	VI	Gibraltar	Isle of Wight	Gotland	Guernsey	Gotland
1997	VII	Jersey	Isle of Wight	Faroe Islands	Gotland	Gotland
1999	VIII	Gotland	Isle of Wight	Gotland	Gotland	Gotland
2001	IX	Isle of Man	Isle of Wight	Gotland	Jersey	Faroe Islands
2003	X	Guernsey	Isle of Wight	Gotland	Faroe Islands	Isle of Man
2005	XI	Shetland	Faroe Islands	Guernsey	Faroe Islands	Gotland
2007	XII	Rhodes	Rhodes	Gibraltar	Gotland	Rhodes
2009	XIII	Åland	Åland	Jersey	Gotland	Guernsey
2011	XIV	Isle of Wight	Gotland	Isle of Wight	Gotland	Jersey
2015	XVI	Jersey	Gotland	Jersey	Gotland	
2017	XVII	Gotland	Björn Axelsson; Gotland	Ivik Nielsen; Greenland	Garry Dodd; Guernsey	Nisse Lundberg; Gotland
2019	XVIII	Gibraltar	Ivik Nielsen; Greenland	Garry Dodd; Guernsey	George Downing; Isle of Wight	Jordan Luke Wykes; Jersey
2023	XIX	Guernsey	Max Hedbom; Gotland	Jordan Wykes; Jersey	Luc Miller; Jersey	Ivik Nielsen; Greenland

== Men's doubles ==
Year	Games	Host				
Year	Games	Host	Gold	Silver	Bronze	Bronze
1989	III	Faroe Islands	Gotland	Isle of Man	Greenland	
1991	IV	Åland	Gotland	Faroe Islands	Åland	
1993	V	Isle of Wight	Gotland	Jersey	Åland	
1995	VI	Gibraltar	Isle of Wight	Jersey	Gotland	Gotland
1997	VII	Jersey	Isle of Wight	Gotland	Gotland	Guernsey
1999	VIII	Gotland	Gotland	Isle of Wight	Gotland	Faroe Islands
2001	IX	Isle of Man	Isle of Wight	Gotland	Jersey	Faroe Islands
2003	X	Guernsey	Isle of Wight	Gotland	Guernsey	Jersey
2005	XI	Shetland	Jersey	Shetland Islands	Faroe Islands	Guernsey
2007	XII	Rhodes	Rhodes	Gotland	Gibraltar	Guernsey
2009	XIII	Åland	Gotland	Gotland	Guernsey	Åland
2011	XIV	Isle of Wight	Guernsey	Jersey	Åland	Jersey
2015	XVI	Jersey	Gotland	Jersey	Gotland	
2017	XVII	Gotland	Greenland	Guernsey	Jersey	Gotland
2019	XVIII	Gibraltar	Jersey	Greenland	Isle of Wight	Guernsey
2023	XIX	Guernsey	Jersey	Gotland	Greenland	Guernsey

== Women's singles ==
Year	Games	Host				
Year	Games	Host	Gold	Silver	Bronze	Bronze
1987	II	Guernsey	Gotland	Gotland	Guernsey	
1989	III	Faroe Islands	Gotland	Gotland	Greenland	
1991	IV	Åland	Gotland	Prince Edward Island	Gotland	
1993	V	Isle of Wight	Isle of Wight	Gotland	Gotland	
1995	VI	Gibraltar	Gotland	Isle of Wight	Gotland	Isle of Man
1997	VII	Jersey	Gotland	Isle of Wight	Guernsey	Gotland
1999	VIII	Gotland	Gotland	Isle of Wight	Gotland	Guernsey
2001	IX	Isle of Man	Isle of Wight	Gotland	Guernsey	Jersey
2003	X	Guernsey	Isle of Wight	Guernsey	Gotland	Greenland
2005	XI	Shetland	Gotland	Guernsey	Isle of Wight	Orkney Islands
2007	XII	Rhodes	Guernsey	Gotland	Guernsey	Isle of Man
2009	XIII	Åland	Gotland	Jersey	Gotland	Guernsey
2011	XIV	Isle of Wight	Guernsey	Shetland Islands	Gotland	Guernsey
2015	XVI	Jersey	Guernsey	Åland	Jersey	
2017	XVII	Gotland	Björn Axelsson; Åland	Henrietta Nielsen; Faroe Islands	Dawn Morgan; Guernsey	Evelina Carlsson; Gotland
2019	XVIII	Gibraltar	Marina Donner; Åland	Karlinannguaq Lundblad; Greenland	Katerine Vinas; Isle of Man	Dawn Morgan; Guernsey
2023	XIX	Guernsey	Hannah Silcock; Jersey	Marina Donner; Åland	Alice Edwards; Guernsey	Katherine Vinas; Isle of Man

== Women's doubles ==
Year	Games	Host				
Year	Games	Host	Gold	Silver	Bronze	Bronze
1989	III	Faroe Islands	Gotland	Greenland	Isle of Man	
1991	IV	Åland	Greenland	Gotland	Isle of Man	
1993	V	Isle of Wight	Gotland	Greenland	Isle of Wight	
1995	VI	Gibraltar	Gotland	Isle of Man	Isle of Wight	Jersey
1997	VII	Jersey	Gotland	Isle of Wight	Guernsey	(Anglesey) Ynys Môn
1999	VIII	Gotland	Gotland	Gotland	Guernsey	Jersey
2001	IX	Isle of Man	Gotland	Jersey	Isle of Man	Guernsey
2003	X	Guernsey	Guernsey	Jersey	Guernsey	Isle of Man
2005	XI	Shetland	Gotland	Shetland Islands	Guernsey	Shetland Islands
2007	XII	Rhodes	Guernsey	Shetland Islands	Guernsey	Orkney Islands
2009	XIII	Åland	Gotland	Guernsey	Gotland	Jersey
2011	XIV	Isle of Wight	Guernsey	Jersey	Faroe Islands	Gotland
2015	XVI	Jersey	Guernsey	Faroe Islands	Gotland	
2017	XVII	Gotland	Faroe Islands	Gotland	Gotland	Guernsey
2019	XVIII	Gibraltar	Gotland	Guernsey	Faroe Islands	Isle of Man
2023	XIX	Guernsey	Guernsey	Jersey	Gotland	Greenland

== Mixed doubles ==
Year	Games	Host				
Year	Games	Host	Gold	Silver	Bronze	Bronze
1989	III	Faroe Islands	Gotland	Gotland	Greenland	
1991	IV	Åland	Gotland	Gotland	Greenland	
1993	V	Isle of Wight	Gotland	Gotland	Isle of Man	
1995	VI	Gibraltar	Isle of Wight	Gotland	Isle of Man	Jersey
1997	VII	Jersey	Isle of Wight	Jersey	Gotland	Gotland
1999	VIII	Gotland	Isle of Wight	Gotland	Gotland	Isle of Man
2001	IX	Isle of Man	Isle of Wight	Guernsey	Jersey	Jersey
2003	X	Guernsey	Isle of Wight	Gotland	Guernsey	Guernsey
2005	XI	Shetland	Gotland	Guernsey	Greenland	Shetland Islands
2007	XII	Rhodes	Rhodes	Gotland	Guernsey	Jersey
2009	XIII	Åland	Gotland	Gotland	Gotland	Jersey
2011	XIV	Isle of Wight	Guernsey	Guernsey	Jersey	Gotland
2015	XVI	Jersey	Åland Islands	Guernsey	Gotland	
2017	XVII	Gotland	Åland Islands	Gotland	Jersey	Guernsey
2019	XVIII	Gibraltar	Åland Islands	Isle of Wight	Gotland	Guernsey
2023	XIX	Guernsey	Guernsey	Gotland	Åland Islands	Jersey

== Team Event ==
Year	Games	Host				
Year	Games	Host	Gold	Silver	Bronze	Bronze
1987	II	Guernsey	Gotland	Isle of Man	Guernsey	
1989	III	Faroe Islands	Gotland	Isle of Man	Faroe Islands	
1991	IV	Åland	Gotland	Faroe Islands	Greenland	
1993	V	Isle of Wight	Gotland	Jersey	Isle of Man	
1995	VI	Gibraltar	Isle of Wight	Gotland	Isle of Man	Jersey
1997	VII	Jersey	Isle of Wight	Gotland	Jersey	
1999	VIII	Gotland	Gotland	Isle of Wight	Guernsey	
2003	X	Guernsey	Isle of Wight	Jersey	Guernsey	
2005	XI	Shetland	Guernsey	Gotland	Faroe Islands	Shetland Islands
2007	XII	Rhodes	Gotland	Guernsey	Isle of Wight	Rhodes
2009	XIII	Åland	Gotland	Jersey	Greenland	Guernsey
2011	XIV	Isle of Wight	Guernsey	Gotland	Jersey	Menorca
2015	XVI	Jersey	Guernsey	Gotland	Åland	
2017	XVII	Gotland	Guernsey	Greenland	Åland Islands	Gotland
2019	XVIII	Gibraltar	Guernsey	Jersey	Gotland	Greenland
2023	XIX	Guernsey	Jersey	Guernsey	Gotland	Isle of Wight
