= Shooting at the Island Games =

Shooting sports events at the biennial Island Games

Shooting is an event at the Island Games, the biennial multi-sports event for island nations, territories and dependencies.

Shooting at the Island Games has had Men, Women and Open events since the games started in 1985.

Host Island should endeavour to put on a Programme of Events (to a maximum of 10 Events to include a maximum of 3 Events specifically for Ladies) from the following:-

- ISSF - Olympic Skeet - requires 8 firing stations and 2 towers
- ISSF - Automatic Ball Trap - requires 1 house with a single trap machine
- ISSF - Double Trap - requires 1 house with 3 trap machines
- ISSF - Olympic Trap - requires a bank of 15 trap machines
- FITASC - Universal Trench - requires a bank of 5 trap machines
- FITASC - Sporting Clay - Format to be agreed by Host Island and Technical Committee

IGR Island Games Record NGR New Games Record

== Events ==
Event		I 1985	II	III	IV	V	VI 1995	VII	VIII	IX	X	XI 2005	XII	XIII	XIV	XV	XVI 2015	XVII	XVIII	XIX 2023
Current events
Clay target
Clay target	Trap			X	X		X	X		X	X				X	X	X		X	
Clay target	Automatic ball trap	X	X			X		X	X	X	X	X	X	X	X	X	X	X	X	X
Clay target	Skeet	X	X	X	X	X	X	X	X	X	X	X	X	X	X	X	X	X	X	X
Rifle
Rifle	10 m air rifle	X	X		X	X	X	X	X	X	X	X	X	X	X	X	X	X	X	X
Rifle	50 m rifle prone	X	X			X	X	X	X	X			X	X	X	X	X	X	X	
Rifle	50 m rifle three positions		X			X			X	X				X		X	X	X	X	
Rifle	100yd rifle prone				X			X							X		X	X	X	
Rifle	Fullbore Kings (formerly Queens)		X					X			X						X			X
Pistol
Pistol	10 m air pistol	X	X		X	X		X	X	X	X	X	X	X	X	X	X	X	X	X
Pistol	25 m pistol				X	X		X	X	X			X	X	X	X	X	X	X	X
Pistol	25m sport pistol							X	X	X			X	X	X	X	X	X	X	X
Pistol	25m centrefire (ISSF)		X			X	X	X	X			X	X	X	X	X	X	X	X	X
Pistol	25 m rapid fire pistol		X					X	X				X	X		X	X	X	X	
Pistol	50 m pistol	X	X			X		X	X	X				X	X	X	X	X	X	X
Pistol	Police pistol					X		X	X	X							X	X	X	X
Pistol	Service pistol							X	X	X	X						X	X	X	X
Pistol	Standard division																X	X	X	
Pistol	Open division																X	X	X	
Pistol	1500 PPC							X	X	X							X	X	X	
Black powder shooting
Black powder shooting	25 m revolver							X	X	X	X		X				X	X	X	
Past events
Clay target
Clay target	Sporting							X		X	X	X	X	X	X		X			
Clay target	Universal trench												X			X				
Rifle
Rifle	Centre fire rifle							X	X						X					
Pistol
Pistol	Practical target		X																	
Pistol	25m centrefire (non ISSF/CISM)												X							

== Island Games records ==
Island Games shooting records.

=== Black Powder ===
Black Powder
Event	Athlete	Island	Record	Year
25m Black Powder - Revolver	Mick Radcliffe	Jersey	96	2003
25m Black Powder - Revolver Team	Team	Jersey	183	2003
25m Black Powder - Single Shot	Mick Radcliffe	Jersey	89	2007
25m Black Powder - Single Shot Team	Team	Jersey	168	2007

=== Air Pistol and Rifle ===
Air Pistol and Air Rifle
Event	Athlete	Island	Record	Year
Air Pistol - Men	Morgan Johansson Cropper	Gotland	574	2023
Air Pistol - Men Pairs	Pairs	Shetland	1120	1997
Air Pistol - Women	Iryna Tyletskaya	Åland Islands	468	2007
Air Rifle - Men	Scott Douglas	Jersey	676.30	2005
Air Rifle - Open Pairs	Pairs	Gotland	1156	1997

=== Automatic Ball Trap ===
Automatic Ball Trap
Event	Athlete	Island	Record	Year
Automatic Ball Trap - Men	Alex Johannesen	Faroe Islands	140	2019
Automatic Ball Trap - Open	Alex Johannesen	Faroe Islands	140	2019

=== English Sporting ===
English Sporting
Event	Athlete	Island	Record	Year
English Sporting - Men	Tom Thomas	Ynys Môn	85	1997
English Sporting - Women	Sheila Davy	Jersey	55	2003
English Sporting - Team Men	Team event	Jersey	159	1997
English Sporting - Team Women	Team event	Jersey	86	2003

=== ISSF ===
ISSF
Event	Athlete	Island	Record	Year
ISSF 10m Air Pistol - Men	Morgan Johansson Cropper	Gotland	574	2023
ISSF 10m Air Pistol – Team Men	Team	Shetland	1120	1997
ISSF 10m Air Pistol – Team Women	Team	Jersey	732	2015
ISSF 10m Air Pistol – Women	Iryna Tyletskaya	Åland Islands	374	2007
ISSF 10m Air Rifle – Men	Cameron Pirouet	Jersey	247.9 GR	2019
ISSF 10m Air Rifle – Team Men	Team	Gotland	1205.4	2017
ISSF 10m Air Rifle – Team Mixed	Team	Jersey	483.4 FGR	2019
ISSF 10m Air Rifle – Team Women	Team	Gibraltar	759	2009
ISSF 10m Air Rifle – Women	Team	Gotland	245.1 GR	2017
ISSF 25m Centrefire – Men	Peter Nordgren	Gotland	580	2003
ISSF 25m Centrefire – Team Men	Team	Jersey	1134	1997
ISSF 25m Rapidfire – Men	Peter Nordgren	Gotland	545	2007
ISSF 25m Rapidfire – Team Men	Team	Gotland	1083	2007
ISSF 25m Sport Pistol – Men	Peter Nordgren	Gotland	572	2001
ISSF 25m Sport Pistol – Team Men	Team	Gotland	1124	1997
ISSF 25m Sport Pistol – Team Women	Team	Isle of Wight	1103	2017
ISSF 25m Sport Pistol – Women	Imogen Moss	Isle of Wight	556	2017
ISSF 25m Standard Pistol – Men	Peter Nordgren	Gotland	570	2009
ISSF 25m Standard Pistol – Team Men	Team	Gotland	1122	1999
ISSF 25m Standard Pistol – Team Women	Team	Isle of Wight	1113	2017
ISSF 25m Standard Pistol – Women	Nikki Trebert	Guernsey	531	2017
ISSF 300m Centre Fire Prone Rifle	Bruce Horwood	Jersey	596	1997
ISSF 300m Centre Fire Prone Rifle - Team	Team	Jersey Gotland	1160	1997 2017
ISSF 50m 3 Position Smallbore Rifle - Men	Simon Henry	Cayman Islands	430	2017
ISSF 50m 3 Position Smallbore Rifle – Team Men	Team	Gotland	1116	2017
ISSF 50m 3 Position Smallbore Rifle – Team Women	Team	Gotland	1035	2015
ISSF 50m 3 Position Smallbore Rifle – Women	Jemma Toms	Isle of Wight	426.7	2015
ISSF 50m Free Pistol – Men	Mattias Steffenburg	Gotland	534	1999
ISSF 50m Free Pistol – Team Men	Team	Gotland	1045	2017
ISSF 50m Prone Smallbore Rifle – Men	Andrew Chapman	Jersey	242.4	2017
ISSF 50m Prone Smallbore Rifle – Team Men	Team	Isle of Wight	1233.8	2019
ISSF 50m Prone Smallbore Rifle – Team Women	Team	Jersey	1221.9	2019
ISSF 50m Prone Smallbore Rifle –Women	Sarah Campion	Jersey	598.4	2017
ISSF Skeet Individual	Andre Carre	Guernsey	137	2003

=== Non ISSF ===
ISSF
Event	Athlete	Island	Record	Year
Non ISSF 25m Rapid Fire CISM	Peter Nordgren	Gotland	560	2007
Non ISSF 25m Rapid Fire CISM - Team	Team	Jersey	1057	2007

=== NPA ===
NPA
Event	Athlete	Island	Record	Year
NPA Police Pistol 2 - Team	Team	Guernsey	1142	2015
NPA Police Pistol B - Open	Andy Torode	Guernsey	111	2015

=== NRA ===
NRA
Event	Athlete	Island	Record	Year
NRA 1500 PPC - Open	Mark Littleton	Jersey	1463	2015
NRA 1500 PPC - Team	Team	Jersey	2891	1999

=== NSRA ===
NSRA
Event	Athlete	Island	Record	Year
NSRA 100 Yards Prone Rifle - Men	Andy Potter	Isle of Man	590	2015
NSRA 100 Yards Prone Rifle - Women	Rachel Glover	Isle of Man	585	2011
NSRA 100 Yards Prone Rifle – Team Men	Team	Gibraltar	1164	2011
NSRA 100 Yards Prone Rifle – Team Women	Team	Jersey	1158	2017

=== Olympic ===
Olympic
Event	Athlete	Island	Record	Year
Olympic Skeet - Men	Andre Carre	Guernsey	137	2003
Olympic Skeet – Team Men	Team	Isle of Man	186	2001
Olympic Trap – Men	Juan Manuel Bagur Bosch	Menorca	136	2007
Olympic Trap – Women	Marlene Place	Guernsey	59	2007
Olympic Trap – Team Men	Team	Menorca	186	2007
