= Archery at the Island Games =

Archery is an event at the Island Games, the biennial multi-sports event for island nations, territories and dependencies. There have been men's, women's and team events at almost every games since 1987. Modern competitive archery is governed by the World Archery Federation, abbreviated WA (formerly FITA - Fédération Internationale de Tir à l'Arc).

Recurve Individual

- Men - 4 competitors per Island
- Women - 2 competitors per Island

Recurve Team - 1 team with up to 6 competitors per Island

Compound Individual

- Men - 4 competitors per Island
- Women - 2 competitors per Island

Compound Team - 1 team with up to 6 competitors per Island

Minimum age 13 on day of opening ceremony.

== Events ==
Event		II 1987	III 1989	IV 1991	V 1993	VI 1995	VII 1997	VIII 1999	IX 2001	X 2003	XI 2005	XII 2007	XIII 2009	XIV 2011	XV	XVI 2015	XVII 2017	XVIII	XIX 2023
Current events
Recurve
Recurve	Single WA 1440 (formerly FITA) recurve				X	X	X	X	X	X	X	X	X	X		X	X		X
Recurve	Recurve knockout									X	X	X	X	X		X	X		X
Recurve	Recurve 720										X	X		X		X	X		n
Compound
Compound	Single WA 1440 (formerly FITA) compound					X	X	X	X	X	X	X	X	X		X	X		X
Compound	Compound knockout									X	X	X	X	X		X	X		X
Compound	Compound 720										X	X		X		X	X		n
Past events
Double FITA		X	X	X															

n = non medal competition

== Overall medal table ==
	Gold Medals		Total Medals	
	No:	Team	No:	Team
Single FITA Recurve	9	Faroe Islands	20	Faroe Islands
Recurve Knockout	4	Faroe Islands	15	Faroe Islands
Recurve 720	3	Faroe Islands	7	Faroe Islands
Single FITA Compound	19	Faroe Islands	36	Faroe Islands
Compound Knockout	12	Faroe Islands	21	Faroe Islands
Compound 720	5	Faroe Islands	8	Faroe Islands
Double FITA	3	Guernsey Malta	5	Åland Guernsey

== Single WA 1440 (formerly FITA) recurve ==
Firing 144 arrows in total, being 3 dozen at each of 30m, 50m, 70m and 90m targets for men and 30m, 50m, 60m and 70m for women.

=== Top medalists ===
	Gold Medals		Total Medals	
	No:	Team	No:	Team
Single FITA Recurve	9; 7	Faroe Islands; IOW	20; 17	Faroe Islands; Guernsey

=== Results ===
Year	Games	Host	Event			
Year	Games	Host	Event	Gold	Silver	Bronze
1993	V	IOW	Men; Women; Team	Jersey NGR; IOW NGR; IOW NGR	Åland (Anglesey) Ynys Môn; Isle of Man	Isle of Man; Saaremaa; Jersey
1995	VI	Gibraltar	Men; Women; Team	Jersey NGR; IOW; IOW	Åland; Shetland; Jersey	Shetland; Shetland; Shetland
1997	VII	Jersey	Men; Women; Team	Åland; IOW; IOW	Faroe Islands; Guernsey; Shetland	Shetland (Anglesey) Ynys Môn; Faroe Islands
1999	VIII	Gotland	Men; Women; Team	Shetland; Guernsey; Shetland	Åland; Guernsey; IOW	Jersey; Gotland; Guernsey
2001	IX	Isle of Man	Men; Women; Team	Shetland; Guernsey; Shetland	Faroe Islands; Shetland; IOW	Åland; Jersey; Faroe Islands
2003	X	Guernsey	Men; Women; Team	(Anglesey) Ynys Môn; Isle of Man NGR; Jersey	Åland; Isle of Man; Shetland	Shetland; IOW; IOW
2005	XI	Shetland	Men; Women; Team	(Anglesey) Ynys Môn; Jersey; Faroe Islands	Orkney Islands; IOW; Orkney Islands	Shetland; Isle of Man; Shetland
2007	XII	Rhodes	Men; Women; Team	(Anglesey) Ynys Môn; Faroe Islands; Faroe Islands	Rhodes; Rhodes; Rhodes	Faroe Islands; Guernsey (Anglesey) Ynys Môn
2009	XIII	Åland	Men; Women; Team	Menorca; Faroe Islands; Faroe Islands	Jersey; Rhodes; Rhodes	Faroe Islands; Guernsey; Åland
2011	XIV	Isle of Wight	Men; Women; Team	Orkney Islands; Åland NGR; Faroe Islands	IOW; Guernsey; Guernsey	Faroe Islands; Faroe Islands; Åland
2015	XVI	Jersey	Men; Women; Team	Menorca NGR; Guernsey; IOW	Rhodes; Isle of Man; Guernsey	Faroe Islands; Åland; Åland
2017	XVII	Gotland	Men; Women; Team	Faroe Islands; Guernsey; Guernsey	Guernsey; Guernsey; Åland	Faroe Islands; Åland; Faroe Islands
2023	XIX	Guernsey	Men; Women; Team	Faroe Islands; Gotland; Faroe Islands	Bermuda; Guernsey; Guernsey	Åland Islands; Jersey; Jersey

== Recurve knockout ==
Firing 12, 18 or 36 arrows.

=== Top medalists ===
	Gold Medals		Total Medals	
	No:	Team	No:	Team
Single FITA Recurve	4; 3	Faroe Islands; Åland Islands	15; 10	Faroe Islands; Guernsey

=== Results ===
Year	Games	Host	Event			
Year	Games	Host	Event	Gold	Silver	Bronze
2003	X	Guernsey	Men's Head to Head; Women's Head to Head; Team Head to Head	IOW; IOM; Shetland NGR	Jersey; IOM; Jersey	Orkney Islands; Jersey; Guernsey
2005	XI	Shetland	Men's Head to Head; Women's Head to Head; Team Head to Head	(Anglesey) Ynys Môn; Shetland; Faroe Islands	Faroe Islands; IOM; Shetland	IOW; IOW; Orkney Islands
2007	XII	Rhodes	Men's Head to Head; Women's Head to Head; Team Head to Head	Rhodes; Rhodes (Anglesey) Ynys Môn	IOM; Faroe Islands; Faroe Islands	Faroe Islands; IOM; Orkney Islands
2009	XIII	Åland	Men's Head to Head; Women's Head to Head; Team Head to Head	IOM; Faroe Islands; Faroe Islands	Faroe Islands; Rhodes; Rhodes	Menorca; Guernsey; Åland
2011	XIV	Isle of Wight	Men's Head to Head; Women's Head to Head; Team Head to Head	Menorca; Åland; Faroe Islands	Faroe Islands; Guernsey; Jersey	Gotland; Gotland; Åland
2015	XVI	Jersey	Men's Head to Head; Women's Head to Head; Team Head to Head	Jersey; Guernsey; IOW	Falkland Islands; Guernsey; Jersey	Menorca; Åland; Guernsey
2017	XVII	Gotland	Men's Head to Head; Women's Head to Head; Team Head to Head	Menorca; Åland; Jersey	Faroe Islands; Guernsey; Menorca	Faroe Islands; Guernsey; Faroe Islands
2023	XIX	Guernsey	Men's Head to Head; Women's Head to Head; Team Head to Head; Mixed Head to Head	Åland Islands; Gotland; Falkland Islands; Gotland	Falkland Islands; Jersey; Guernsey; Faroe Islands	Bermuda; Guernsey; Faroe Islands; Jersey

== Recurve 720 ==
Firing 72 arrows.

Year	Games	Host	Event			
Year	Games	Host	Event	Gold	Silver	Bronze
2005	XI	Shetland	Men's 720; Women's 720	Faroe Islands NGR; IOW NGR	Shetland; Shetland	(Anglesey) Ynys Môn; Faroe Islands
2007	XII	Rhodes	Men's 720; Women's 720	Faroe Islands; Rhodes	(Anglesey) Ynys Môn; Faroe Islands	Rhodes; Guernsey
2011	XIV	Isle of Wight	Men's 720; Women's 720	Orkney Islands NGR; Åland NGR	Faroe Islands; Faroe Islands	Gotland; Guernsey
2015	XVI	Jersey	Men's 720; Women's 720	Faroe Islands NGR; Jersey	Rhodes; Guernsey	Jersey; Åland
2017	XVII	Gotland	Men's 720; Women's 720	Åland; Guernsey	Faroe Islands; Åland	Faroe Islands; Falkland Islands

== Single WA 1440 (formerly FITA) compound ==
Firing 144 arrows in total, being 3 dozen at each of 30m, 50m, 70m and 90m targets for men and 30m, 50m, 60m and 70m for women.

=== Top Medalists ===
	Gold Medals		Total Medals	
	No:	Team	No:	Team
Single FITA Compound	19; 5	Faroe Islands; IOM	36; 18	Faroe Islands; Jersey

=== Results ===
Year	Games	Host	Event			
Year	Games	Host	Event	Gold	Silver	Bronze
1995	VI	Gibraltar	Men; Women	IOW; Faroe Islands	Faroe Islands; Faroe Islands	Jersey; Jersey
1997	VII	Jersey	Men; Women; Team	IOW; Faroe Islands NGR; Faroe Islands	Guernsey; Jersey; Jersey	Faroe Islands; IOW; IOW
1999	VIII	Gotland	Men; Women; Team	Faroe Islands NGR; Isle of Man; Faroe Islands NGR	Faroe Islands; Faroe Islands; Isle of Man	Jersey; Guernsey
2001	IX	Isle of Man	Men; Women; Team	Faroe Islands; Guernsey; Faroe Islands NGR	Faroe Islands; Faroe Islands; Guernsey	Jersey; Isle of Man; Jersey
2003	X	Guernsey	Men; Women; Team	Jersey; Shetland; Jersey	Jersey; Isle of Man; Faroe Islands	Faroe Islands; Faroe Islands; Isle of Man
2005	XI	Shetland	Men; Women; Team	Faroe Islands; Isle of Man; Faroe Islands	Jersey; Jersey; Guernsey	Guernsey; Faroe Islands; Jersey
2007	XII	Rhodes	Men; Women; Team	Faroe Islands; Faroe Islands NGR; Faroe Islands NGR	Faroe Islands; Shetland; Shetland	Guernsey; IOW; Guernsey
2009	XIII	Åland	Men; Women; Team	Shetland NGR; Isle of Man NGR; Faroe Islands NGR	Faroe Islands; Faroe Islands; Isle of Man	Orkney Islands; Shetland; Shetland
2011	XIV	Isle of Wight	Men; Women; Team	Faroe Islands NGR; Isle of Man NGR; Faroe Islands NGR	Faroe Islands; Jersey; Shetland	Gotland; Isle of Man; Jersey
2015	XVI	Jersey	Men; Women; Team	IOW; Isle of Man NGR; Faroe Islands	Orkney Islands; Jersey; IOW	Faroe Islands; Guernsey; Guernsey
2017	XVII	Gotland	Men; Women; Team	Gotland; Faroe Islands; Faroe Islands	Gotland; Guernsey; Guernsey	Faroe Islands; Guernsey; Gotland
2023	XIX	Guernsey	Men; Women; Team	Faroe Islands; Jersey; Jersey	Orkney; Isle of Man; Isle of Man	Isle of Man; Guernsey; Guernsey

== Compound knockout ==
Firing 12, 18 or 36 arrows.

=== Top Medalists ===
	Gold Medals		Total Medals	
	No:	Team	No:	Team
Single FITA Recurve	12; 6	Faroe Islands; Jersey	21; 13	Faroe Islands; Guernsey Isle of Man

=== Results ===
Year	Games	Host	Event			
Year	Games	Host	Event	Gold	Silver	Bronze
2003	X	Guernsey	Men's Head to Head; Women's Head to Head; Team Head to Head	Guernsey; Shetland; Faroe Islands	Jersey; Isle of Man; Guernsey	Faroe Islands; IOW; Jersey
2005	XI	Shetland	Men's Head to Head; Women's Head to Head; Team Head to Head	Jersey; Isle of Man NGR; Faroe Islands	Faroe Islands; Isle of Man; Shetland	Faroe Islands; Jersey; Jersey
2007	XII	Rhodes	Men's Head to Head; Women's Head to Head; Team Head to Head	Faroe Islands; Faroe Islands; Faroe Islands	Guernsey; Shetland; Shetland	Guernsey; Isle of Man; Guernsey
2009	XIII	Åland	Men's Head to Head; Women's Head to Head; Team Head to Head	Faroe Islands NGR; Isle of Man; Orkney Islands NGR	Menorca; Isle of Man; Faroe Islands	Menorca; Guernsey; Shetland
2011	XIV	Isle of Wight	Men's Head to Head; Women's Head to Head; Team Head to Head	Gotland; Jersey; Guernsey	Guernsey; Isle of Man; Faroe Islands	Faroe Islands; Faroe Islands; IOW
2015	XVI	Jersey	Men's Head to Head; Women's Head to Head; Team Head to Head	Faroe Islands; Jersey; Faroe Islands	Gotland; Guernsey; Jersey	IOW; Isle of Man; Isle of Man
2017	XVII	Gotland	Men's Head to Head; Women's Head to Head; Team Head to Head	Faroe Islands; Faroe Islands; Faroe Islands	Gotland; Guernsey; Guernsey	Faroe Islands; Jersey; Isle of Man
2023	XIX	Guernsey	Men's Head to Head; Women's Head to Head; Team Head to Head; Mixed Head to head	Faroe Islands; Jersey; Jersey; Jersey	Isle of Man; Jersey; Isle of Man; Guernsey	Jersey; Guernsey; Faroe Islands; Isle of Man

== Compound 720 ==
Firing 72 arrows.

Year	Games	Host	Event			
Year	Games	Host	Event	Gold	Silver	Bronze
2005	XI	Shetland	Men's 720; Women's 720	Faroe Islands NGR; IOM NGR	Jersey; IOM	Shetland; Faroe Islands
2007	XII	Rhodes	Men's 720; Women's 720	Faroe Islands; Faroe Islands	Guernsey; Shetland	Guernsey; IOW
2011	XIV	Isle of Wight	Men's 720; Women's 720	Faroe Islands; IOM	Faroe Islands; Jersey	Faroe Islands; IOM
2015	XVI	Jersey	Men's 720; Women's 720	Faroe Islands NGR 605; Jersey NGR	IOW; Guernsey	IOW; Jersey
2017	XVII	Gotland	Men's 720; Women's 720	Gotland; Guernsey	Gotland; Faroe Islands	Faroe Islands; Guernsey

== Double FITA ==
Year	Games	Host	Event			
Year	Games	Host	Event	Gold	Silver	Bronze
1987	II	Guernsey	Men; Women; Team	Malta; Malta; Malta	Åland (Anglesey) Ynys Môn; Guernsey	Malta; IOW; IOW
1989	III	Faroe Islands	Men; Women; Team	Guernsey; Guernsey; Guernsey	Åland (Anglesey) Ynys Môn; IOM	IOW; Shetland; IOW
1991	IV	Åland	Men; Women; Team	Åland NGR; Saaremaa; Åland	Åland (Anglesey) Ynys Môn; Jersey	Faroe Islands; Shetland; Guernsey

== Notes ==
- NGR in tables indicates New Games Record
