= Athletics at the Island Games =

Athletics is an event at the Island Games, the biennial multi-sports event for island nations, territories and dependencies.

Athletics at the Island Games has been a part of the games since the beginning in 1985. The events are for both men and women.

There are limits on the number of teams and competitors that can enter from each Island. The minimum age is 15, except for the half marathon which is 18.

== Events ==
| Event | I 1985 | II | III | IV | V | VI 1995 | VII | VIII | IX | X | XI 2005 | XII | XIII | XIV | XV | XVI 2015 | XVII 2017 | XVIII 2019 | XIX 2023 |
Current events (track)
| 100 m | X | X | X | X | X | X | X | X | X | X | X | X | X | X | X | X | X | X | X |
| 200 m | X | X | X | X | X | X | X | X | X | X | X | X | X | X | X | X | X | X | X |
| 400 m | X | X | X | X | X | X | X | X | X | X | X | X | X | X | X | X | X | X | X |
| 800 m | X | X | X | X | X | X | X | X | X | X | X | X | X | X | X | X | X | X | X |
| 1500 m | X | X | X | X | X | X | X | X | X | X | X | X | X | X | X | X | X | X | X |
| 5000 m | X | X | X | X | X | X | X | X | X | X | X | X | X | X | X | X | X | X | X |
| 10,000 m | | | X | X | X | X | X | X | X | X | X | X | X | X | X | X | X | X | X |
| 100 m hurdles | X | X | X | X | X | X | X | X | X | X | X | X | X | X | X | X | X | X | X |
| 110 m hurdles | X | X | X | X | X | X | X | X | X | X | X | X | X | X | X | X | X | X | X |
| 400 m hurdles | | X | X | X | X | X | X | X | X | X | X | X | X | X | X | X | X | X | X |
| 4 × 100 m relay | X | X | X | X | X | X | X | X | X | X | X | X | X | X | X | X | X | X | X |
| 4 × 400 m relay | | X | X | X | X | X | X | X | X | X | X | X | X | X | X | X | X | X | X |
| 3000 m steeplechase | | | | X | X | X | X | X | X | X | X | X | X | X | X | X | X | X | X |
| Half marathon | X | X | X | X | X | X | X | X | X | X | X | X | X | X | X | X | X | X | X |
| Half marathon team | X | X | X | X | X | X | X | X | X | X | X | X | X | X | X | X | X | X | X |
Current events (field)
| Long jump | X | X | X | X | X | X | X | X | X | X | X | X | X | X | X | X | X | X | X |
| Triple jump | X | X | X | X | X | X | X | X | X | X | X | X | X | X | X | X | X | X | X |
| High jump | X | X | X | X | X | X | X | X | X | X | X | X | X | X | X | X | X | X | X |
| Discus throw | X | X | X | X | X | X | X | X | X | X | X | X | X | X | X | X | X | X | X |
| Hammer throw | | | | X | X | X | X | X | X | X | X | X | X | X | | X | X | X | X |
| Javelin throw | X | X | X | X | X | X | X | X | X | X | X | X | X | X | X | X | X | X | X |
| Shot put | X | X | X | X | X | X | X | X | X | X | X | X | X | X | X | X | X | X | X |
Past events
| Marathon | | | X | | | | | | | | | | | | | | | | |
| 10 km walk | X | X | | | | | | | | | | | | | | | | | |
| Pole vault | | | | X | X | X | X | X | | X | X | X | | | | | | | |

== Games records ==
- As of 2025

=== Men ===
Men
| Event | Athlete | Island | Record | Date | Ref |
|---|---|---|---|---|---|
| 100 m | Harold Houston | Bermuda | 10.34 | 2013 | |
| 200 m | Harold Houston | Bermuda | 21.05 | 2013 | |
| 400 m | Jónas Gunnleivsson Isaksen | Faroe Islands | 46.02 | 2023 | |
| 800 m | Michael Guegan | Jersey | 1:50.37 | 1993 | |
| 1500 m | Keith Gerrard | Isle of Man | 3:48.45 | 2011 | |
| 5000 m | Osian Perrin | Ynys Môn | 14:11.85 | 2023 | |
| 10,000 m | Corrin Leeming | Isle of Man | 29:56.11 | 14 July 2025 | |
| 110 m hurdles | Dale Garland | Guernsey | 14.65 | 2005 | |
| 400 m hurdles | Alastair Chalmers | Guernsey | 49.83 | 2023 | |
| 3000 m steeplechase | Mikael Nordblom | Åland Islands | 8:57.46 | 1991 | |
| 4 × 100 m relay | team event | Cayman Islands | 41.10 | 2013 | |
| 4 × 400 m relay | team event | Guernsey | 3:11.95 | 2023 | |
| High jump | Martin Aram | Isle of Man | 2.13 | 2003 | |
| Long jump | Mattias Sunneborn | Gotland | 7.73 | 1993 | |
| Triple jump | Carl Morgan | Cayman Islands | 15.68 | 2011 | |
| Shot put | Zane Duquemin | Jersey | 18.10 | 2015 | |
| Discus | Nicholas Percy | Isle of Wight | 58.33 | 2023 | |
| Javelin | Alexander Pascal | Cayman Islands | 73.39 | 2017 | |
| Hammer throw | Andrew Frost | Isle of Wight | 70.61 | 2011 | |
| Half marathon | Janne Holmén | Åland Islands | 1:06:34 | 2009 | |

=== Women ===
Women
| Event | Athlete | Island | Record | Date | Ref |
|---|---|---|---|---|---|
| 100 m | Sara Wiss | Åland Islands | 11.86 | 2023 | |
| 200 m | Cydonie Mothersill | Cayman Islands | 23.27 | 2007 | |
| 400 m | Catherine Reid | Isle of Man | 53.39 | 2015 | |
| 800 m | Rachael Franklin | Isle of Man | 2:09.87 | 2019 | |
| 1500 m | Rachael Franklin | Isle of Man | 4:20.42 | 2023 | |
| 5000 m | Rachael Franklin | Isle of Man | 16:05.80 | 2023 | |
| 10,000 m | Ann-Catrin Nordman | Åland Islands | 36:11.68 | 1997 | |
| 100 m hurdles | Kelly Sotherton | Isle of Wight | 14.39 | 1997 | |
| 400 m hurdles | Diana Lindqvist | Åland Islands | 1:00.72 | 1991 | |
| 3000 m steeplechase | Marina Olives | Menorca | 10:58.28 | 2019 | |
| 4 × 100 m relay | team event | Cayman Islands | 47.60 | 1999 | |
| 4 × 400 m relay | team event | Guernsey | 3:49.66 | 2023 | |
| High jump | Linda Treiel | Saaremaa | 1.78 | 2013 | |
| Long jump | Kim Murray | Isle of Wight | 5.95 | 2007 | |
| Triple jump | Jasmine Brunson | Bermuda | 12.64 | 2013 | |
| Shot put | Linda Treiel | Saaremaa | 14.16 | 2013 | |
| Discus | Shadine Duquemin | Jersey | 48.58 | 2015 | |
| Javelin | Lauren Therin | Jersey | 50.54 | 2007 | |
| Hammer throw | Marit Zahkna | Isle of Man | 48.89 | 2009 | |
| Half marathon | Brenda Walker | Isle of Man | 1:13:35 | 1991 | |
