= Golf at the Island Games =

Golf at the Island Games, the biennial multi-sports event for island nations, territories and dependencies, was first played in 1991 with the Ladies competitions starting in 1997. It has now become a regular sport in the Island Games.

Individual competitions

- Men – a maximum of 4 amateur competitors per Member Island
- Ladies – a maximum of 4 amateur competitors per Member Island

Team events

- Men – a maximum of 4 amateur competitors and a minimum of 3 amateur competitors per Member Island.
- Ladies – a maximum of 4 amateur competitors and a minimum of 3 amateur competitors per Member Island

Minimum age – 13

== Events ==
Event	IV 1991	V 1993	VI	VII 1997	VIII 1999	IX 2001	X 2003	XI 2005	XII 2007	XIII 2009	XIV 2011	XV 2013	XVI 2015	XVII 2017	XVIII	XIX 2023
Men's individual	X	X		X	X	X	X	X	X	X	X	X	X	X		X
Men's team	X	X		X	X	X	X	X	X	X	X	X	X	X		X
Women's individual				X	X	X	X	X	X	X	X	X	X	X		X
Women's team				X	X	X	X	X	X	X	X	X	X	X		X

== Top medalists ==
	Gold medals		Total medals	
	No:	Team	No:	Team
Men's individual	5	Isle of Man	11	Isle of Man
Men's team	5	Isle of Man	10	Isle of Man; Jersey
Women's individual	4	Åland	10	Jersey
Women's team	4	Jersey	8	Gotland

== Men's individual ==
Year	Games	Host	Gold	Silver	Bronze
1991	IV	Åland	Robert Eggo; Guernsey	Michael Burns; Jersey	Mark Harris; Jersey
1993	V	Isle of Wight	David McToldridge; Isle of Wight	Richard Harrop; Jersey	(Anglesey) Ynys Môn Emyr Jones; Guernsey Nigel Vaudin
1997	VII	Jersey	James Birch; Jersey	Kenneth Lindquist; Åland	Richard Williamson; Jersey
1999	VIII	Gotland	Kenneth Lindquist; Åland	Robert Eggo; Guernsey	Andrew Boxall; Jersey
2001	IX	Isle of Man	Kevin Moore; Isle of Man	Allyn Laing; Isle of Man	Andrew Challenor; Isle of Man
2003	X	Guernsey	Robert Eggo; Guernsey	Mick Marley; Guernsey	Guernsey Stephen Mahy; Isle of Man Andrew Challenor; Isle of Man Kevin Moore
2005	XI	Shetland	Kevin Moore; Isle of Man	Robert Eggo; Guernsey	Andrew Fraser Hunt; Bermuda
2007	XII	Rhodes	William Haddrell; Bermuda	Mark Bell; Isle of Wight	Nicholas Mansell; Bermuda
2009	XIII	Åland	Jarryd Dillas; Bermuda	David Jones; Isle of Man	Daniel Augustus; Bermuda
2011	XIV	Isle of Wight	Paul Lowey; Isle of Man	Brandon Robinson-Thompson; Isle of Wight	Damian Palanyandi; Bermuda
2013	XV	Bermuda	Gavin O'Neill; Jersey	Jarryd Dillas; Bermuda	Johan Lindholm; Åland
2015	XVI	Jersey	Tom Harris; Isle of Man	Gavin O'Neill; Jersey	Robert Eggo; Guernsey
2017	XVII	Gotland	Alex McAuley; Isle of Man	Tom Harris; Isle of Man	Colin Daly; Gotland
2023	XIX	Guernsey	Josef Hacker; Jersey	Jamie Blondel; Guernsey	Jeremy Nicolle; Guernsey

== Men's team event ==
Year	Games	Host	Gold	Silver	Bronze
1991	IV	Åland	Jersey	Guernsey	Åland
1993	V	Isle of Wight	Jersey	Guernsey	(Anglesey) Ynys Môn
1997	VII	Jersey	Jersey	Gotland	Isle of Man
1999	VIII	Gotland	Åland	Gotland	Jersey
2001	IX	Isle of Man	Isle of Man	Jersey	Guernsey
2003	X	Guernsey	Guernsey	Isle of Man	Jersey
2005	XI	Shetland	Isle of Man	Guernsey	Bermuda
2007	XII	Rhodes	Bermuda	Isle of Man	Åland
2009	XIII	Åland	Bermuda	Isle of Man	Jersey
2011	XIV	Isle of Wight	Isle of Man	Isle of Wight	Guernsey
2013	XV	Bermuda	Bermuda	IOW	Jersey
2015	XVI	Jersey	Isle of Man	Guernsey	Bermuda
2017	XVII	Gotland	Isle of Man	Jersey	Gotland
2023	XIX	Guernsey	Guernsey	Jersey	Isle of Man

== Women's individual ==
Year	Games	Host	Gold	Silver	Bronze
1997	VII	Jersey	Jenny Deeley; Jersey	Lynne Cummins; Jersey	Gloria Paradiso; Jersey
1999	VIII	Gotland	Lynne Cummins; Jersey	Victoria Leffler; Gotland	Anna-Karin Salmén; Åland
2001	IX	Isle of Man	Anna-Karin Salmén; Åland	Irene Tait; Shetland	Therese Ahx; Isle of Man
2003	X	Guernsey	Anna-Karin Salmén; Åland	Sophie Beardsall; Isle of Wight	Tanya Jansson; Åland
2005	XI	Shetland	Laura Robinson; Bermuda	Ebonie Burgess; Bermuda	Sophie Beardsell; Isle of Wight
2007	XII	Rhodes	Laura Robinson; Bermuda	Olivia Jordan-Higgins; Jersey	Sara Larsson; Gotland
2009	XIII	Åland	Jenny Häggblom; Åland	Olivia Jordan-Higgins; Jersey	Samantha Widmer; Cayman Islands
2011	XIV	Isle of Wight	Sara Larsson; Gotland	Emma Powell; Isle of Wight	Sophie Beardsall; Isle of Wight
2013	XV	Bermuda	Lina Billing; Gotland	Aimee Ponte; Guernsey	Samantha Widmer; Cayman Islands
2015	XVI	Jersey	Aimee Ponte; Guernsey	Flora Keites; Jersey	Jennifer Deeley; Jersey
2017	XVII	Gotland	Emma Lindman; Åland	Flora Keites; Jersey	Sophie Beardsall; Isle of Wight
2023	XIX	Guernsey	Ebonie Cox; Bermuda	Flora Keites; Jersey	Christella Winzell; Gotland

== Women's team event ==
Year	Games	Host	Gold	Silver	Bronze
1997	VII	Jersey	Jersey	Isle of Wight	Guernsey
1999	VIII	Gotland	Gotland	Jersey	Isle of Man
2001	IX	Isle of Man	Åland	Guernsey	Gotland
2003	X	Guernsey	Åland	Guernsey	Isle of Wight
2005	XI	Shetland	Shetland	Bermuda	Isle of Wight
2007	XII	Rhodes	Jersey	Gotland	Bermuda
2009	XIII	Åland	Bermuda	Åland	Gotland
2011	XIV	Isle of Wight	Isle of Wight	Gotland	Guernsey
2013	XV	Bermuda	Guernsey	Isle of Wight	Gotland
2015	XVI	Jersey	Jersey	Isle of Man	Guernsey
2017	XVII	Gotland	Gotland	Isle of Wight	Jersey
2023	XIX	Guernsey	Jersey	Bermuda	Gotland
