= Tennis at the Island Games =

Tennis is a sport that has been included in the program of the Island Games, which is a multi-sport event held every two years between teams representing islands that are members of the International Island Games Association. The event includes both men's and women's singles and doubles competitions, and the format is similar to that of other international tennis tournaments. The first Island Games were held in 1985 and included tennis as one of the sports. Since then, the sport has been included in every edition of the games.

- Member Islands could bring a maximum of 5 men and 5 women players to the Games.
- Singles - a maximum of 4 Men and 4 Women competitors per Member Island
- Doubles - a maximum of 2 Men and 2 Women pairs per Member Island
- Mixed Doubles - a maximum of 4 pairs per Member Island
- Team - A maximum of 1 Men's Team and 1 Ladies Team each to consist of a maximum of 4 players and a minimum of 2 players.
- Minimum age - 14

== Events ==
Event	IV 1991	V 1993	VI 1995	VII 1997	VIII 1999	IX 2001	X 2003	XI	XII 2007	XIII 2009	XIV 2011	XV 2013	XVI 2015	XVII 2017	XVIII 2019	XIX 2023
Men's singles	X	X	X	X	X	X	X		X	X	X	X	X	X	X	X
Men's doubles	X	X	X	X	X	X	X		X	X	X	X	X	X	X	X
Women's singles	X	X	X	X	X	X	X		X	X	X	X	X	X	X	X
Women's doubles	X	X	X	X	X	X	X		X	X	X	X	X	X	X	X
Mixed doubles	X	X	X	X	X	X	X		X	X	X	X	X	X	X	x
Team events	X	X	X	X	X	X	X		X	X	X	X	X	X	X	X

== Top Medalists ==
	Gold Medals		Total Medals	
	No:	Team	No:	Team
Men's singles	6	Jersey	16	Jersey
Men's doubles	6	Jersey	12	Jersey
Men's Team	6	Jersey	12	Jersey
Women's singles	7	Gibraltar	13	Åland
Women's doubles	4	Åland; Isle of Man	13	Isle of Man
Women's Team	6	Gibraltar	10	Gibraltar
Mixed doubles	3	Isle of Man	10	Gibraltar

== Men's ==
=== Men's singles ===
Year	Games	Host				
Year	Games	Host	Gold	Silver	Bronze	Bronze
1991	IV	Åland	Gotland	Gotland	Åland	Jersey
1993	V	Isle of Wight	Jersey	Gotland	Gibraltar	Gibraltar
1995	VI	Gibraltar	Jersey	Åland	Åland	Gibraltar
1997	VII	Jersey	Åland	Åland	Jersey	Jersey
1999	VIII	Gotland	Rhodes	Jersey	Cayman Islands	Gotland
2001	IX	Isle of Man	Jersey	Cayman Islands	Isle of Man	Rhodes
2003	X	Guernsey	Gotland	Jersey	Isle of Man	Saaremaa
2007	XII	Rhodes	Cayman Islands	Bermuda	Jersey	Menorca
2009	XIII	Åland	Cayman Islands	Åland	Guernsey	Isle of Man
2011	XIV	Isle of Wight	Cayman Islands	Bermuda	Menorca	Jersey
2013	XV	Bermuda	Isle of Man; Billy Harris	Guernsey; Dominic McLuskey	Guernsey; Patrick Ogier	Jersey; James Connelly
2015	XVI	Jersey	Isle of Man; Billy Harris	Jersey; Scott Clayton	Guernsey; Patrick Ogier	Jersey; Stuart Parker
2017	XVII	Gotland	Stuart Parker; Jersey	Patrick Ogier; Guernsey	Miguel Alberti Fuster; Menorca	Priit Suluste; Saare County
2019	XVIII	Gibraltar	Stuart Parker; Jersey	Oscar Mesquida-Berg; Menorca	Gavin Manders; Bermuda	Miguel Albertí-Fuster; Menorca
2023	XIX	Guernsey	Stuart Parker; Jersey	Oscar Richard Mesquida Berg; Menorca	Filip Devallius; Gotland	Zacharias Forsström; Åland

=== Men's doubles ===
Year	Games	Host				
Year	Games	Host	Gold	Silver	Bronze	Bronze
1991	IV	Åland	Gotland	Jersey	Åland	Guernsey
1993	V	Isle of Wight	Gibraltar; Gotland	abandoned - rain		
1995	VI	Gibraltar	Gibraltar	Jersey	Åland	Gotland
1997	VII	Jersey	Jersey	Åland	Åland	Gotland
1999	VIII	Gotland	Åland	Gotland	Jersey	Rhodes
2001	IX	Isle of Man	Cayman Islands	Åland	Isle of Man	Jersey
2003	X	Guernsey	Jersey	Gotland	Gibraltar	Isle of Man
2007	XII	Rhodes	Bermuda	Guernsey	Åland	Cayman Islands
2009	XIII	Åland	Guernsey	Isle of Man	Åland	Rhodes
2011	XIV	Isle of Wight	Bermuda	Bermuda	Menorca	Saaremaa
2013	XV	Bermuda	Jersey	Bermuda	Bermuda	Guernsey
2015	XVI	Jersey	Jersey	Guernsey	Gotland	Jersey
2017	XVII	Gotland	Jersey	Bermuda	Saaremaa	Guernsey
2019	XVIII	Gibraltar	Jersey	Bermuda	Menorca	Åland Islands
2023	XIX	Guernsey	Menorca	Åland Islands	Bermuda	Jersey

=== Men's Team ===
Year	Games	Host				
Year	Games	Host	Gold	Silver	Bronze	Bronze
1991	IV	Åland	Gotland	Jersey	Åland	
1993	V	Isle of Wight	Gotland	Jersey	(Isle of Wight) IOW	
1995	VI	Gibraltar	Jersey	Gibraltar	Åland	
1997	VII	Jersey	Åland	Jersey	Gotland	
1999	VIII	Gotland	Gotland	Åland	Jersey	
2001	IX	Isle of Man	Rhodes	Jersey	Cayman Islands	
2003	X	Guernsey	Jersey	Isle of Man	Gotland	
2007	XII	Rhodes	Guernsey	Bermuda	Cayman Islands	
2009	XIII	Åland	Guernsey	Cayman Islands	Isle of Man	
2011	XIV	Isle of Wight	Cayman Islands	Menorca	Isle of Man	
2013	XV	Bermuda	Guernsey	Jersey	Bermuda	Menorca
2015	XVI	Jersey	Jersey	Isle of Man	Åland	Guernsey
2017	XVII	Gotland	Jersey	Gotland	Bermuda	Guernsey
2019	XVIII	Gibraltar	Jersey	Menorca	Bermuda	Isle of Man
2023	XIX	Guernsey	Jersey	Menorca	Åland Islands	Bermuda

== Women's ==
=== Women's singles ===
Year	Games	Host				
Year	Games	Host	Gold	Silver	Bronze	Bronze
1991	IV	Åland Islands	Åland Islands	Åland Islands	Gotland	Guernsey
1993	V	Isle of Wight	Gibraltar	Jersey	Åland Islands	Guernsey
1995	VI	Gibraltar	Gibraltar	Åland Islands	Guernsey	Jersey
1997	VII	Jersey	Gibraltar	Åland Islands	Åland Islands	Isle of Wight
1999	VIII	Gotland	Åland Islands	Rhodes	Åland Islands	Gibraltar
2001	IX	Isle of Man	Åland Islands	Åland Islands	Gibraltar	Rhodes
2003	X	Guernsey	Gibraltar	Åland Islands	Isle of Man	Rhodes
2007	XII	Rhodes	Gibraltar	Åland Islands	Menorca	Rhodes
2009	XIII	Åland Islands	Gotland	Menorca	Åland Islands	Menorca
2011	XIV	Isle of Wight	Gibraltar	Menorca	Bermuda	Menorca
2013	XV	Bermuda	Bermuda; Tyler Smith	Isle of Man; Laura Feely	Menorca; Laura Moreno	Menorca; Sandra Moll
2015	XVI	Jersey	Guernsey; Ella Taylor	Isle of Wight; Reegan Greenwood	Gotland; Tzvetelina Havrén	Jersey; Natasha Forrest
2017	XVII	Gotland	Gemma Negre-Sánchez; Menorca	Laura Feely; Isle of Man	Tsvetelina Havrén; Gotland	Joanna Dyer; Guernsey
2019	XVIII	Gibraltar	Amanda Carreras; Gibraltar	Tsvetelina Havrén; Gotland	Clara Catchot-Sintes; Menorca	Laura Feely; Isle of Man
2023	XIX	Guernsey	Lauren Watson-Steele; Guernsey	Natasha Forrest; Jersey	Anna Kirk; Isle of Man	Shelby Madeiros; Bermuda

=== Women's doubles ===
Year	Games	Host				
Year	Games	Host	Gold	Silver	Bronze	Bronze
1991	IV	Åland Islands	Åland Islands	Guernsey	Jersey	Isle of Man
1993	V	Isle of Wight	Gibraltar	Guernsey	Jersey	Guernsey
1995	VI	Gibraltar	Gibraltar	Jersey	Guernsey	Isle of Man
1997	VII	Jersey	Åland Islands	Jersey	Gibraltar	Guernsey
1999	VIII	Gotland	Åland Islands	Gibraltar	Isle of Man	Rhodes
2001	IX	Isle of Man	Åland Islands	Gibraltar	Jersey	Isle of Man
2003	X	Guernsey	Guernsey	Åland Islands	Gibraltar	Jersey
2007	XII	Rhodes	Menorca	Åland Islands	Jersey	Isle of Man
2009	XIII	Åland Islands	Menorca	Gibraltar	Isle of Man	Isle of Man
2011	XIV	Isle of Wight	Gibraltar	Gibraltar	Menorca	Åland Islands
2013	XV	Bermuda	Bermuda	Isle of Man	Åland Islands	Bermuda
2015	XVI	Jersey	Isle of Man	Jersey	Åland Islands	Jersey
2017	XVII	Gotland	Isle of Man	Jersey	Åland Islands	Menorca
2019	XVIII	Gibraltar	Gibraltar	Isle of Man	Åland Islands	Jersey
2023	XIX	Guernsey	Guernsey	Isle of Man	Jersey	Jersey

=== Women's Team ===
Year	Games	Host				
Year	Games	Host	Gold	Silver	Bronze	Bronze
1991	IV	Åland Islands	Åland Islands	Isle of Man	Guernsey	
1993	V	Isle of Wight	Gibraltar	Jersey	Guernsey	
1995	VI	Gibraltar	Gibraltar	Jersey	Guernsey	
1997	VII	Jersey	Jersey	Guernsey	Åland Islands	
1999	VIII	Gotland	Åland Islands	Gibraltar	Isle of Man	
2001	IX	Isle of Man	Åland Islands	Gibraltar	Isle of Man	
2003	X	Guernsey	Gibraltar	Åland Islands	Guernsey	
2007	XII	Rhodes	Gibraltar	Menorca	Åland Islands	
2009	XIII	Åland Islands	Menorca	Gibraltar	Åland Islands	
2011	XIV	Isle of Wight	Gibraltar	Menorca	Isle of Man	
2013	XV	Bermuda	Bermuda	Menorca	Isle of Man	Gibraltar
2015	XVI	Jersey	Guernsey	Jersey	Isle of Man	Isle of Wight
2017	XVII	Gotland	Isle of Man	Menorca	Jersey	Guernsey
2019	XVIII	Gibraltar	Gibraltar	Isle of Man	Guernsey	Jersey
2023	XIX	Guernsey	Jersey	Gotland	Isle of Man	Guernsey

== Mixed doubles ==
Year	Games	Host				
Year	Games	Host	Gold	Silver	Bronze	Bronze
1991	IV	Åland Islands	Gotland	Åland Islands	Guernsey	Jersey
1993	V	Isle of Wight		abandoned - rain		
1995	VI	Gibraltar	Gibraltar	Jersey	Gibraltar	Jersey
1997	VII	Jersey	Åland Islands	Gibraltar	Jersey	Guernsey
2001	IX	Isle of Man	Rhodes	Guernsey	Cayman Islands	Rhodes
2003	X	Guernsey	Isle of Man	Gibraltar	Gibraltar	Isle of Man
2007	XII	Rhodes	Rhodes	Gibraltar	Isle of Man	Menorca
2009	XIII	Åland Islands	Menorca	Jersey	Åland Islands	Gotland
2011	XIV	Isle of Wight	Åland Islands	Gibraltar	Gibraltar	Guernsey
2013	XV	Bermuda	Isle of Man	Isle of Man	Åland Islands	Gibraltar
2015	XVI	Jersey	Guernsey	Isle of Man	Gotland	Åland Islands
2017	XVII	Gotland	Guernsey	Gotland	Isle of Man	Åland Islands
2019	XVIII	Gibraltar	Jersey	Isle of Man	Gotland	Åland Islands
2023	XIX	Guernsey	Isle of Man	Guernsey	Isle of Man	Cayman Islands
