= Sailing at the Island Games =

Sailing is an event at the Island Games, the biennial multi-sports event for island nations, territories and dependencies.

Sailing at the Island Games was first introduced as a sport in 1995.

Sailboarding (or as it is sometimes called Windsurfing, which was only invented in 1948), started earlier, in 1993.

All the participants in the Games are surrounded by water (except Gibraltar), so water sports are attractive.

- Sailing

- ILCA 7 Laser Standard Rig - A maximum of 2 entries per Member Island.
- ILCA 6 Laser Radial Rig - A maximum of 2 entries per Member Island.
- The team positions shall be calculated by adding the points of each team’s best three places for each race sailed (this is not necessarily the same 3 sailors in each race).
- Age - minimum 13

- Sailboarding

- A maximum of 4 entries per Member Island.
- The team positions shall be calculated by adding the points of each team’s best three places for each race sailed (this is not necessarily the same 3 sailors in each race).
- Age - minimum 13

== Events ==
Event	V 1993	VI 1995	VII 1997	VIII 1999	IX 2001	X 2003	XI 2005	XII 2007	XIII 2009	XIV 2011	XV 2013	XVI 2015	XVII	XVIII 2019	XIX 2023	XX 2025
Laser Standard		X	X	X	X	X	X	X	X	X	X	X		X	X	X
Laser Radial			X	X	X	X	X	X	X	X	X	X		X	X	X
Sailing Team					X	X	X	X	X	X	X	X		X	X	X
Sailboarding	X	X	X			X	X	X	X	X	X	X				
Sailboarding Team	X	X	X			X	X	X	X	X	X	X				

== Top Medalists ==
	Gold Medals		Total Medals	
	No:	Team	No:	Team
Sailing	9; 6	(Anglesey) Ynys Môn; Guernsey	16; 15	(Anglesey) Ynys Môn; Guernsey
Sailboarding	7; 5	Guernsey; Menorca	21; 13	Guernsey; Jersey

== Sailing ==
=== Sailing Laser Standard Rig ===
Year	Games	Host			
Year	Games	Host	Gold	Silver	Bronze
1995	VI	Gibraltar	Isle of Wight	Jersey	Gibraltar
1997	VII	Jersey	Jersey	Isle of Wight	Guernsey
1999	VIII	Gotland	Isle of Wight	Rhodes	Jersey
2001	IX	Isle of Man	Saaremaa	Guernsey	Guernsey
2003	X	Guernsey	Guernsey	Saaremaa	Guernsey
2005	XI	Shetland	Bermuda	Jersey	Jersey
2007	XII	Rhodes	(Anglesey) Ynys Môn	Isle of Wight	Menorca
2009	XIII	Åland	Åland	(Anglesey) Ynys Môn	(Anglesey) Ynys Môn
2011	XIV	Isle of Wight	(Anglesey) Ynys Môn	(Anglesey) Ynys Môn	Åland
2013	XV	Bermuda	Eifion Mon; Ynys Môn	Niklas Areschoug; Åland Islands	Dyfrig Mon; Ynys Môn
2015	XVI	Jersey	Eifion Mon (Anglesey) Ynys Môn	Harry Blowers; Isle of Wight	Kalin Hillier; Bermuda
2019	XVIII	Gibraltar	Dominic Breen-Turner; Ynys Môn	Andrew Bridgman; Guernsey	Peeter Kaju; Saaremaa
2023	XIX	Guernsey	Borja Torres Florit; Menorca	Dominic Breen-Turner; Ynys Môn	Nicole Stovell; Bermuda
2025	XX	Orkney	Arthur Farley; Isle of Wight	Josh Metcalfe; Ynys Môn	Harry White; Isle of Wight

=== Sailing Laser Radial Rig ===
Year	Games	Host			
Year	Games	Host	Gold	Silver	Bronze
1997	VII	Jersey	Isle of Wight	Isle of Wight	Isle of Wight
1999	VIII	Gotland	Gotland	Rhodes	Shetland
2001	IX	Isle of Man	Guernsey	Isle of Wight	Shetland
2003	X	Guernsey	Isle of Wight	Åland	Guernsey
2005	XI	Shetland	Bermuda	Jersey	Shetland
2007	XII	Rhodes	Saaremaa	Bermuda	Menorca
2009	XIII	Åland	Saaremaa	Isle of Wight	Rhodes
2011	XIV	Isle of Wight	Åland	Guernsey	Bermuda
2013	XV	Bermuda	Markus Rönnberg; Åland Islands	Bleddyn Mon; Ynys Môn	Kalin Hillier; Bermuda
2015	XVI	Jersey	Benjamin Todd (Anglesey) Ynys Môn	Kristo Õunap; Saaremaa	Milio Schauman; Åland
2019	XVIII	Gibraltar	Clementine Thompson; Guernsey	Silver Vahstein; Saaremaa	Daniel Rüütel; Saaremaa
2023	XIX	Guernsey	Andrew Bridgman; Guernsey	Per Sahlberg; Åland	James Tilley; Jersey
2025	XX	Orkney	Oliver Mayo; Isle of Wight	Ines Maria Abreu Garcia; Menorca	Will Jackson; Cayman Islands

=== Sailing Team ===
Year	Games	Host			
Year	Games	Host	Gold	Silver	Bronze
2001	IX	Isle of Man	Guernsey	Jersey	Isle of Man
2003	X	Guernsey	Guernsey	Isle of Man	Jersey
2005	XI	Shetland	Jersey	Bermuda	Shetland
2007	XII	Rhodes	Isle of Wight	Guernsey	Menorca
2009	XIII	Åland	Bermuda	Isle of Wight	Menorca
2011	XIV	Isle of Wight	(Anglesey) Ynys Môn	Åland	Bermuda
2013	XV	Bermuda	(Anglesey) Ynys Môn	Bermuda	Åland
2015	XVI	Jersey	(Anglesey) Ynys Môn	Åland	Isle of Wight
2019	XVIII	Gibraltar	Saaremaa	Guernsey	Bermuda
2023	XIX	Guernsey	Åland Islands	Isle of Wight	Ynys Môn
2025	XX	Orkney	Isle of Wight	Ynys Môn	Guernsey

== Sailboarding ==
	Gold Medals		Total Medals	
	No:	Team	No:	Team
Individual	3; 3	Guernsey; Menorca	12; 7	Guernsey; Menorca
Team	4; 2; 2	Guernsey; Jersey; Menorca	9; 6; 4	Jersey; Guernsey; Menorca

=== Sailboarding Individual ===
Year	Games	Host			
Year	Games	Host	Gold	Silver	Bronze
1993	V	Isle of Wight	Guernsey	Isle of Wight	Guernsey
1995	VI	Gibraltar	Isle of Wight	Guernsey	Jersey
1997	VII	Jersey	Isle of Wight	Guernsey	Isle of Wight
2003	X	Guernsey	Jersey	Guernsey	Guernsey
2005	XI	Shetland	Guernsey	Åland	Åland
2007	XII	Rhodes	Menorca	Menorca	Menorca
2009	XIII	Åland	Menorca	Menorca	Menorca
2011	XIV	Isle of Wight	Menorca	Guernsey	Bermuda
2013	XV	Bermuda	Andrew Petts; Cayman Islands	Pierre le Page; Guernsey	Alex Jones; Bermuda
2015	XVI	Jersey	Stephen Pertegas Melia; Jersey	David Kendell; Bermuda	Jo Robinson; Guernsey

=== Sailboarding Long Distance Individual ===
Year	Games	Host			
Year	Games	Host	Gold	Silver	Bronze
2005	XI	Shetland	Guernsey	Jersey	Guernsey

=== Sailboarding Team Event ===
Year	Games	Host			
Year	Games	Host	Gold	Silver	Bronze
1993	V	Isle of Wight	Guernsey	Isle of Wight	Jersey
1995	VI	Gibraltar	Guernsey	Jersey	Isle of Wight
1997	VII	Jersey	Guernsey	Isle of Wight	Jersey
2003	X	Guernsey	Jersey	Guernsey	Åland; Shetland
2005	XI	Shetland	Åland	Guernsey	
2007	XII	Rhodes	Menorca	Jersey	
2009	XIII	Åland Islands	Menorca	Jersey	
2011	XIV	Isle of Wight	Bermuda	Menorca	Jersey
2013	XV	Bermuda	Jersey	not awarded	not awarded
2015	XVI	Jersey	Guernsey	Jersey	Menorca
