= Judo at the Island Games =

Judo competition

Judo was an event at the Island Games, the biennial multi-sports event for island nations, territories and dependencies. Judo first appeared as a sport at the Island Games in 1989

Minimum age - 13

== Events ==
Event	III 1989	IV 1991	V 1993	VI 1995	VII XI	XII 2007	XIII 2009	XIV XVII	XVIII 2019
Men
-60kg	X	X	X	X		X	X		X
-65kg		X	X	X		X	X		
-66kg									X
-71kg	X	X	X	X					
-73kg						X	X		X
-78kg	X	X		X					
-81kg						X	X		X
-86kg	X	X	X	X					
-90kg						X	X		X
-95kg	X	X	X	X					
-100kg						X	X		X
+95kg	X			X					
+100kg						X	X		X
Open	X	X	X	X					X
Team		X	X	X		X	X		X
Women
-48kg						X			
-52kg						X			X
-56kg	X		X	X		X	X		
-61kg	X	X	X	X		X	X		
-63kg									X
-66kg			X						
-70kg						X			X
-78kg						X			X
Open									X

== Top Medalists ==
	Gold Medals		Total Medals	
	No:	Team	No:	Team
Men's	17; 8	Faroe Islands; IOW	60; 22	Faroe Islands; IOW
Women's	10; 9	Isle of Man; Åland	29; 23	Åland; Isle of Man

== Men's ==
=== Men's Individual ===
==== Men's 1 ====
Year	Games	Host	Weight				
Year	Games	Host	Weight	Gold	Silver	Bronze	Bronze
1989	III	Faroe Islands	<60 kg	Faroe Islands	Faroe Islands		
1991	IV	Åland	<60 kg	Faroe Islands	Faroe Islands	Jersey	
1993	V	Isle of Wight	<60 kg	Isle of Wight	Faroe Islands	Faroe Islands	
1995	VI	Gibraltar	<60 kg	Faroe Islands	Åland	Faroe Islands	Gibraltar
2007	XII	Rhodes	<60 kg	Rhodes	Faroe Islands	Åland	Prince Edward Island
2009	XIII	Åland	<60 kg	Rhodes	Åland	Saaremaa	Faroe Islands
2019	XVIII	Gibraltar	<60 kg	Aso Hosseini; Åland Islands	Damià Marí; Menorca	Pau Aguado; Menorca	Aiden Ward; Jersey

==== Men's 2 ====
Year	Games	Host	Weight				
Year	Games	Host	Weight	Gold	Silver	Bronze	Bronze
1991	IV	Åland	<65 kg	Jersey	Åland	Faroe Islands	
1993	V	Isle of Wight	<65 kg	Gibraltar	Faroe Islands	Jersey	
1995	VI	Gibraltar	<65 kg	Isle of Man	Jersey	Faroe Islands	Isle of Wight
2007	XII	Rhodes	<65 kg	Faroe Islands	Faroe Islands	Menorca	Rhodes
2009	XIII	Åland	<66 kg	Saaremaa	Isle of Man	Guernsey	Åland
2019	XVIII	Gibraltar	<66 kg	Bárður Hentze Lenvig; Faroe Islands	Taavi Eigo; Saaremaa	Linus Höglund; Åland Islands	Dánjal á Krákusteini; Faroe Islands

==== Men's 3 ====
Year	Games	Host	Weight				
Year	Games	Host	Weight	Gold	Silver	Bronze	Bronze
1989	III	Faroe Islands	<71 kg	Faroe Islands	Iceland	Isle of Man	
1991	IV	Åland	<71 kg	Åland	Faroe Islands	Isle of Man	
1993	V	Isle of Wight	<71 kg	Faroe Islands	Åland	Isle of Man	
1995	VI	Gibraltar	<71 kg	Faroe Islands	Isle of Man	Åland	Isle of Wight
2007	XII	Rhodes	<73 kg	Guernsey	Faroe Islands	Prince Edward Island	Rhodes
2009	XIII	Åland	<73 kg	Faroe Islands	Faroe Islands	Guernsey	Gibraltar
2019	XVIII	Gibraltar	<73 kg	Oscar Olives; Menorca	Jógvan Páll Kristiansen; Faroe Islands	Gunnar Magnussen; Faroe Islands	Lewis Bourgaize; Guernsey

==== Men's 4 ====
Year	Games	Host	Weight				
Year	Games	Host	Weight	Gold	Silver	Bronze	Bronze
1989	III	Faroe Islands	<78 kg	Åland	Åland	Faroe Islands	
1991	IV	Åland	<78 kg	Åland	Faroe Islands	Faroe Islands	
1995	VI	Gibraltar	<78 kg	Jersey	Isle of Wight	Gibraltar	Faroe Islands
2007	XII	Rhodes	<81 kg	Prince Edward Island	Faroe Islands	Saaremaa	Rhodes
2009	XIII	Åland	<81 kg	Faroe Islands	Rhodes	Faroe Islands	Menorca
2019	XVIII	Gibraltar	<81 kg	Búgvi Poulsen; Faroe Islands	Scott Ashley; Menorca	Jose Luís Arnau; Menorca	William Baker; Jersey

==== Men's 5 ====
Year	Games	Host	Weight				
Year	Games	Host	Weight	Gold	Silver	Bronze	Bronze
1989	III	Faroe Islands	<86 kg	Iceland	Isle of Man		
1991	IV	Åland	<86 kg	Jersey	Isle of Wight	Åland	
1993	V	Isle of Wight	<86 kg	Faroe Islands	Isle of Wight	Isle of Wight	
1995	VI	Gibraltar	<86 kg	Isle of Wight	Faroe Islands	Gibraltar	Isle of Wight
2007	XII	Rhodes	<90 kg	Rhodes	Rhodes	Saaremaa	Faroe Islands
2009	XIII	Åland	<90 kg	Åland	Rhodes	Faroe Islands	Saaremaa
2019	XVIII	Gibraltar	<90 kg	Soni Sorgetz; Menorca	Anders Berndtsson; Åland Islands	Oiol Masso; Menorca	Sigmundur Johansen; Faroe Islands

==== Men's 6 ====
Year	Games	Host	Weight				
Year	Games	Host	Weight	Gold	Silver	Bronze	Bronze
1989	III	Faroe Islands	<95 kg	Iceland	Isle of Man		
1991	IV	Åland	<95 kg	Jersey	Isle of Wight	Isle of Man	
1993	V	Isle of Wight	<95 kg	Isle of Wight	Isle of Wight	Gibraltar	
1995	VI	Gibraltar	<95 kg	Isle of Man	Faroe Islands	Faroe Islands	Isle of Wight
2007	XII	Rhodes	<100 kg	Åland	Faroe Islands	Menorca	Prince Edward Island
2009	XIII	Åland	<100 kg	Rhodes	Åland	Faroe Islands	Menorca
2019	XVIII	Gibraltar	<100 kg	Petur Sigurð Johannesen; Faroe Islands	Madis Laid; Saaremaa	Charles Tromans; Jersey	Benjamin Maher; Isle of Wight

==== Men's 7 ====
Year	Games	Host	Weight				
Year	Games	Host	Weight	Gold	Silver	Bronze	Bronze
1989	III	Faroe Islands	>95 kg	Faroe Islands	Isle of Man		
1995	VI	Gibraltar	>95 kg	Isle of Wight	Jersey	Faroe Islands	Jersey
2007	XII	Rhodes	>100 kg	Rhodes	Isle of Man	Rhodes	
2009	XIII	Åland	>100 kg	Isle of Man	Faroe Islands	Gibraltar	Rhodes
2019	XVIII	Gibraltar	>100 kg	Edvard Sigurdson Johannesen; Faroe Islands	Ethaniel Jeffries-mor; Gibraltar	not awarded	not awarded

==== Men's Open ====
Year	Games	Host				
Year	Games	Host	Gold	Silver	Bronze	Bronze
1989	III	Faroe Islands	Iceland	Iceland	Faroe Islands	Isle of Man
1991	IV	Åland	Isle of Wight	Jersey	Isle of Wight	
1993	V	Isle of Wight	Isle of Wight	Isle of Wight	Isle of Man	
1995	VI	Gibraltar	Isle of Man	Faroe Islands	Faroe Islands	Jersey
2019	XVIII	Gibraltar	Daniel Blinkhorn; Isle of Wight	Louis Plevin; Guernsey	Petur Sigurð Johannesen; Faroe Islands	Edvard Sigurdson Johannesen; Faroe Islands

=== Men's Team ===
Year	Games	Host				
Year	Games	Host	Gold	Silver	Bronze	Bronze
1991	IV	Åland	Jersey	Faroe Islands	Åland	
1993	V	Isle of Wight	Isle of Wight	Faroe Islands	Faroe Islands	
1995	VI	Gibraltar	Faroe Islands	Isle of Man	Isle of Wight	
2007	XII	Rhodes	Rhodes	Faroe Islands	Åland	Prince Edward Island
2009	XIII	Åland	Åland	Rhodes	Saaremaa	Faroe Islands
2019	XVIII	Gibraltar	Faroe Islands	Saaremaa	Åland Islands	Menorca

== Women's ==
=== Women's Individual ===
==== Women's 1 ====
Year	Games	Host	Weight				
Year	Games	Host	Weight	Gold	Silver	Bronze	Bronze
2007	XII	Rhodes	<48 kg	Prince Edward Island	Menorca	Faroe Islands	

==== Women's 2 ====
Year	Games	Host	Weight				
Year	Games	Host	Weight	Gold	Silver	Bronze	Bronze
2007	XII	Rhodes	<52 kg	Rhodes	Saaremaa	Guernsey	
2019	XVIII	Gibraltar	<52 kg	Hannah Niven; Isle of Wight	Mónica Torres; Menorca	Maiken Eivinnsdóttir Bringsberg; Faroe Islands	Maud Wickström; Åland Islands

==== Women's 3 ====
Year	Games	Host	Weight				
Year	Games	Host	Weight	Gold	Silver	Bronze	Bronze
1989	III	Faroe Islands	<56 kg	Iceland	Åland		
1993	V	Isle of Wight	<56 kg	Åland	Isle of Wight	Gibraltar	
1995	VI	Gibraltar	<56 kg	Gibraltar	Isle of Wight		
2007	XII	Rhodes	<57 kg	Rhodes	Menorca	Isle of Man	Rhodes
2009	XIII	Åland	<57 kg	Rhodes	Isle of Man	Isle of Man	Åland

==== Women's 4 ====
Year	Games	Host	Weight				
Year	Games	Host	Weight	Gold	Silver	Bronze	Bronze
1989	III	Faroe Islands	<61 kg	Isle of Man	Faroe Islands		
1991	IV	Åland	<61 kg	Åland	Isle of Man	Åland	
1993	V	IOW	<61 kg	Åland	Jersey	Isle of Man	
1995	VI	Gibraltar	<61 kg	Isle of Wight	Åland	Åland	Gibraltar
2007	XII	Rhodes	<63 kg	Prince Edward Island	Rhodes		
2009	XIII	Åland	<63 kg	Åland	Isle of Man	Isle of Man	
2019	XVIII	Gibraltar	<63 kg	Emily Niven; Isle of Wight	Tania Andreu; Menorca	Sanna Willford; Åland Islands	Sija Johannsen; Faroe Islands

==== Women's 5 ====
Year	Games	Host	Weight				
Year	Games	Host	Weight	Gold	Silver	Bronze	Bronze
1993	V	Isle of Wight	<66 kg	Prince Edward Island	Isle of Man	Jersey	
2007	XII	Rhodes	70 kg	Isle of Man	Rhodes	not awarded	
2019	XVIII	Gibraltar	<70 kg	Emma Pasanen; Åland Islands	not awarded	not awarded	

==== Women's 6 ====
Year	Games	Host	Weight				
Year	Games	Host	Weight	Gold	Silver	Bronze	Bronze
1989	III	Faroe Islands	>72 kg	Isle of Man	Åland		
1991	IV	Åland	>72 kg	Isle of Man	Åland	Iceland	
1993	V	Isle of Wight	>72 kg	Isle of Man	Isle of Wight	Åland	
1995	VI	Gibraltar	>72 kg	Åland	Isle of Man	Åland	

==== Women's 7 ====
Year	Games	Host	Weight				
Year	Games	Host	Weight	Gold	Silver	Bronze	Bronze
2007	XII	Rhodes	<78 kg	Åland	Isle of Man	Rhodes	
2019	XVIII	Gibraltar	<78 kg	Ilse Vuijsters Hammarström; Gotland	Sanna Nolsøe Djurhuus; Faroe Islands	not awarded	

==== Women's Open ====
Year	Games	Host				
Year	Games	Host	Gold	Silver	Bronze	Bronze
1989	III	Faroe Islands	Isle of Man	Åland	Iceland	
1991	IV	Åland	Isle of Man	Åland	Iceland	
1993	V	Isle of Wight	Isle of Man	Åland	Prince Edward Island	
1995	VI	Gibraltar	Isle of Wight	Åland	Isle of Man	Åland
2019	XVIII	Gibraltar	Ilse Vuijsters Hammarström; Gotland	Tania Andreu; Menorca	Llucia Vinent; Menorca	Emma Pasanen; Åland Islands

=== Women's Team ===
==== Women's Team ====
Year	Games	Host				
Year	Games	Host	Gold	Silver	Bronze	Bronze
1991	IV	Åland	Isle of Man	Åland	Jersey	
1993	V	Isle of Wight	Åland	Isle of Wight	Isle of Man	
1995	VI	Gibraltar	Åland	Isle of Man	Isle of Wight	

==== Women's Team Pool ====
Year	Games	Host				
Year	Games	Host	Gold	Silver	Bronze	Bronze
1995	VI	Gibraltar	Isle of Man	Åland	Isle of Wight	
