= Basketball at the Island Games =

Basketball is an event at the Island Games, the biennial multi-sports event for island nations, territories and dependencies.

Basketball has featured in every Island Games since being first chosen as a sport in 1999, excluding the 2005 and 2025 games.

Each Island can enter one team per gender. The minimum age is 13 on the opening day of the games.

== Events ==
Event	VIII 1999	IX 2001	X 2003	XI 2005	XII 2007	XIII 2009	XIV 2011	XV 2013	XVI 2015	XVII 2017	XVIII 2019	XIX 2023	XX 2025
Men's tournament	X	X	X	-	X	X	X	X	X	X	X	X	-
Women's tournament	X	X	X	-	X	X	X	X	X	X	X	X	-

== Top Medalists ==
	Gold Medals		Total Medals	
	No:	Team	No:	Team
Men's	3	Bermuda; Rhodes	6	Bermuda; Cayman Islands; Rhodes; Saaremaa
Women's	6; 2	Menorca; Gotland	6; 7	Gibraltar; Menorca

== Men's Results ==
Year	Games	Host			
Year	Games	Host	Gold	Silver	Bronze
1999	VIII	Gotland	Rhodes	Cayman Islands	Gotland
2001	IX	Isle of Man	Rhodes	Cayman Islands	Gibraltar
2003	X	Guernsey	Rhodes	Cayman Islands	Bermuda
2007	XII	Rhodes	Menorca	Bermuda	Rhodes
2009	XIII	Åland	Bermuda	Menorca	Rhodes
2011	XIV	Isle of Wight	Bermuda	Saaremaa	Rhodes
2013	XV	Bermuda	Bermuda	Saaremaa	
2015	XVI	Jersey	Saaremaa	Bermuda	Gibraltar
2017	XVII	Gotland	Cayman Islands	Gibraltar	Saaremaa
2019	XVIII	Gibraltar	Cayman Islands	Saaremaa	Gibraltar
2023	XIX	Guernsey	Saaremaa	Menorca	Cayman Islands

== Women's Results ==
Year	Games	Host			
Year	Games	Host	Gold	Silver	Bronze
1999	VIII	Gotland	Gotland	Gibraltar	IOM
2001	IX	Isle of Man	Cayman Islands	Gibraltar	Guernsey
2003	X	Guernsey	Guernsey	Gibraltar	Cayman Islands
2007	XII	Rhodes	Menorca	Prince Edward Island	Bermuda
2009	XIII	Åland	Menorca	Guernsey	Gibraltar
2011	XIV	Isle of Wight	Menorca	Gibraltar	Guernsey
2015	XVI	Jersey	Gotland	Menorca	Gibraltar
2017	XVII	Gotland	Menorca	Gotland	Guernsey
2019	XVIII	Gibraltar	Menorca	Gotland	Gibraltar
2023	XIX	Guernsey	Menorca	Cayman Islands	Guernsey
