= Squash at the Island Games =

Biennial multi-sports event

Squash is an event at the Island Games, the biennial multi-sports event for island nations, territories and dependencies.

Squash at the Island Games was first time played in 2005.

- Men's Singles - a maximum of 3 competitors per Member Island
- Women's Singles - a maximum of 3 competitors per Member Island
- Men's Doubles - a maximum of 1 pair per Member Island
- Women's Doubles - a maximum of 1 pair per Member Island
- Mixed Doubles - a maximum of 1 pair per Member Island
- Team Event - a maximum of 1 pair per Member Island
- Age - minimum 13

== Events ==
Event	XI 2005	XII	XIII	XIV 2011	XV 2013	XVI	XVII	XVIII 2019	XIX
Men's singles	X			X	X			X	
Women's singles	X			X	X			X	
Men's doubles	X			X	X			X	
Women's doubles	X			X	X			X	
Mixed doubles	X			X	X			X	
Team	X			X	X			X	

== Top Medalists ==
	Gold Medals		Total Medals	
	No:	Team	No:	Team
Men's'	3	Jersey; Cayman Islands	9	Jersey
Women's'	4	Cayman Islands	7	Guernsey
Mixed and Team	4	Jersey; Cayman Islands	7	Jersey

== Men's ==
=== Men's singles ===
Year	Games	Host				
Year	Games	Host	Gold	Silver	Bronze	Bronze
2005	XI	Shetland	Guernsey; Chris Simpson	Jersey; Michael Hopkins	Bermuda; James Stout	Bermuda; Nicholas Kyme
2011	XIV	Isle of Wight	Jersey; Nick Taylor	Isle of Wight; Alex Phillips	Jersey; Michael Hopkins	
2013	XV	Bermuda	Jersey; Nick Taylor	Jersey; Michael Hopkins	Bermuda; Micah Franklin	
2019	XVIII	Gibraltar	Cameron Stafford; Cayman Islands	David Norman; Isle of Man	Janick Radford; Guernsey	

=== Men's doubles ===
Year	Games	Host				
Year	Games	Host	Gold	Silver	Bronze	Bronze
2005	XI	Shetland	Bermuda	Jersey	IOW	
2011	XIV	Isle of Wight	Jersey	Cayman Islands	Gibraltar	
2013	XV	Bermuda	Cayman Islands	Jersey	Gibraltar	
2019	XVIII	Gibraltar	Cayman Islands	Gibraltar	Jersey	

== Women's ==
=== Women's singles ===
Year	Games	Host				
Year	Games	Host	Gold	Silver	Bronze	Bronze
2005	XI	Shetland	Jersey; Ronnie Jubb	Guernsey; Alison Strobridge	Guernsey; Karen Dunk	IOM; Isabell Klose
2011	XIV	Isle of Wight	Cayman Islands; Caroline Heal	Jersey; Sarah Taylor	Guernsey; Isabella Norman-Ross	
2013	XV	Bermuda	Jersey; Sarah Taylor	Shetland Islands; Joan Smith	Bermuda; Laura Robinson	
2019	XVIII	Gibraltar	Marlene West; Cayman Islands	Natalie Dodd; Guernsey	Amelie Haworth; Isle of Wight	

=== Women's doubles ===
Year	Games	Host				
Year	Games	Host	Gold	Silver	Bronze	Bronze
2005	XI	Shetland	Guernsey	Isle of Wight	Jersey	
2011	XIV	Isle of Wight	Jersey	Guernsey	Cayman Islands	
2013	XV	Bermuda	Cayman Islands	Guernsey	Shetland	
2019	XVIII	Gibraltar	Cayman Islands	Guernsey	Isle of Wight	

== Mixed doubles ==
Year	Games	Host			
Year	Games	Host	Gold	Silver	Bronze
2005	XI	Shetland	Jersey	Bermuda	Guernsey
2011	XIV	Isle of Wight	Jersey	Cayman Islands	Guernsey
2013	XV	Bermuda	Cayman Islands	Jersey	Guernsey
2019	XVIII	Gibraltar	Cayman Islands	Guernsey	Bermuda

== Team Event ==
Year	Games	Host			
Year	Games	Host	Gold	Silver	Bronze
2005	XI	Shetland	Jersey	Guernsey	Bermuda
2011	XIV	Isle of Wight	Jersey	IOW	Cayman Islands
2013	XV	Bermuda	Cayman Islands	Bermuda	Jersey
2019	XVIII	Gibraltar	Cayman Islands	Jersey	Guernsey
