= Football at the 2007 Island Games =

Football at the 2007 Island Games may refer to:

- Football at the 2007 Island Games – Men's tournament
- Football at the 2007 Island Games – Women's tournament
