= 1989 Island Games =

International multi-sport event

- Host: Faroe Islands
- Teams: 15 islands
- Athletes: 800
- Events: 11
- Opening: July 5, 1989
- Closing: July 13, 1989
- Main venue: Svangaskarð

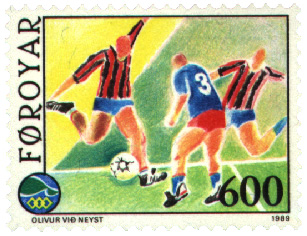
1989 Island Games stamp by Olivur við Neyst

The 1989 Island Games were the third Island Games. They were held in Faroe Islands, from 5 to 13 July.

== Medal table ==
* Host nation (Faroe Islands)

Rank	Nation	Gold	Silver	Bronze	Total
1	Isle of Man	34	28	23	85
2	Iceland	14	12	8	34
3	Faroe Islands*	13	5	10	28
4	Gotland	11	9	6	26
5	Guernsey	9	12	16	37
6	Isle of Wight	8	8	6	22
7	Åland	5	11	9	25
8	Jersey	5	8	7	20
9	Orkney	4	3	4	11
10	Gibraltar	1	1	6	8
11	Shetland	0	3	1	4
12	(Wales) Ynys Mon	0	3	0	3
13	Greenland	0	2	3	5
14	Frøya	0	0	0	0
14	Hitra Municipality	0	0	0	0
Totals (15 entries)		104	105	99	308

== Sports ==
The sports chosen for the games were:

- Archery - see results
- Athletics - see results
- Badminton - see results
- Cycling - see results
- Football (1)
- Gymnastics - see results
- Judo - see results
- Shooting - see results
- Swimming - see results
- Table tennis - see results
- Volleyball - see results
