= 1991 Island Games =

International multi-sport event

- Host: Åland
- Teams: 17 islands
- Athletes: 1700
- Events: 13
- Opening: June 23, 1991
- Closing: June 29, 1991
- Main venue: Wiklöf Holding Arena

The 1991 Island Games were the fourth Island Games, and were held in Åland, from 23 to 29 June.

== Medal table ==
* Host nation (Åland)

Rank	Nation	Gold	Silver	Bronze	Total
1	Åland (ALA)*	23	24	12	59
2	Jersey (JEY)	20	16	33	69
3	Isle of Man (IOM)	20	15	18	53
4	Gotland (Gotland)	19	11	14	44
5	Guernsey (GUE)	13	13	16	42
6	Iceland (ISL)	9	5	8	22
7	Saaremaa	8	7	3	18
8	Faroe Islands (FRO)	6	10	11	27
9	Isle of Wight (IOW)	2	10	10	22
10	Orkney Islands	2	5	1	8
11	Gibraltar (GIB)	2	4	2	8
12	Greenland (GRL)	2	1	6	9
13	Prince Edward Island	1	1	0	2
14	(Wales) Ynys Mon	0	2	1	3
15	Shetland (SHE)	0	1	1	2
16	Frøya	0	0	0	0
16	Sark	0	0	0	0
Totals (17 entries)		127	125	136	388

== Sports ==
The sports chosen for the games were:

- Archery - see results
- Athletics - see results
- Badminton - see results
- Cycling - see results
- Football (1)
- Golf - see results
- Gymnastics - see results
- Judo - see results
- Shooting - see results
- Swimming - see results
- Table tennis - see results
- Tennis - see results
- Volleyball - see results
