= 1993 Island Games =

International multi-sport event

- Host: Isle of Wight
- Teams: 19 islands
- Athletes: 1448
- Events: 14
- Opening: July 3, 1993
- Closing: July 10, 1993
- Main venue: St. George's Park

The 1993 Island Games were the fifth edition of Island Games, and were held on the Isle of Wight, from 3 to 10 July.

== Medal table ==
* Host nation (Isle of Wight)

Rank	Nation	Gold	Silver	Bronze	Total
1	Jersey	31	29	33.3	93.3
2	Isle of Wight*	26	23	18	67
3	Gotland	18.5	17.5	9	45
4	Iceland	17	19	9.7	45.7
5	Guernsey	17	17	18	52
6	Åland	17	13	14.5	44.5
7	Isle of Man	15	22	21.5	58.5
8	Gibraltar	5.5	0.5	6	12
9	Faroe Islands	5	5	13	23
10	Saaremaa	3	5	4.5	12.5
11	Prince Edward Island	1	0	1	2
12	Orkney	0	2	2	4
12	(Wales) Ynys Môn/Anglesey	0	2	2	4
14	Greenland	0	1	0.5	1.5
15	Shetland	0	0	2	2
16	Falkland Islands	0	0	1	1
17	Alderney	0	0	0	0
17	Frøya	0	0	0	0
17	Sark	0	0	0	0
Totals (19 entries)		156	156	156	468

== Sports ==
The sports chosen for the games were:

- Archery - see results
- Athletics - see results
- Badminton - see results
- Cycling - see results
- Football (1)
- Golf - see results
- Gymnastics - see results
- Judo - see results
- Shooting - see results
- Swimming - see results
- Table tennis - see results
- Tennis - see results
- Volleyball - see results
- Windsurfing - see results
