= 1997 Island Games =

International multi-sport event

- Host: Jersey
- Teams: 20 islands
- Athletes: ~ 2000
- Events: 14
- Opening: June 28, 1997
- Closing: July 4, 1997
- Opened by: Elizabeth II
- Main venue: Springfield Stadium

The 1997 Island Games were the seventh Island Games, and were held in Jersey, from June 28, to July 4, 1997.

== Medal table ==
* Host nation (Jersey)

Rank	Nation	Gold	Silver	Bronze	Total
1	Jersey*	75	47	48	170
2	Isle of Wight	22	14	14	50
3	Åland	20	13	8	41
4	Guernsey	18	39	39	96
5	Gotland	14	9	16	39
6	Isle of Man	13	26	20	59
7	Saaremaa	8	7	8	23
8	Faroe Islands	5	10	22	37
9	Shetland	3	5	6	14
10	Orkney	3	1	3	7
11	Wales	2	3	9	14
12	Gibraltar	2	1	2	5
13	Greenland	2	1	1	4
14	Falkland Islands	0	2	5	7
15	Alderney	0	1	0	1
16	Iceland	0	0	1	1
17	Frøya	0	0	0	0
17	Hitra Municipality	0	0	0	0
17	Saint Helena	0	0	0	0
17	Sark	0	0	0	0
Totals (20 entries)		187	179	202	568

== Sports ==
The sports chosen for the games were:

- Archery - see results
- Athletics - see results
- Badminton - see results
- Cycling - see results
- Football (1)
- Golf - see results
- Gymnastics - see results
- Sailing - see results
- Shooting - see results
- Swimming - see results
- Table tennis - see results
- Tennis - see results
- Volleyball - see results
- Windsurfing - see results
