= 1995 Island Games =

International multi-sport event

- Host: Gibraltar
- Teams: 18 islands
- Athletes: 1214
- Events: 14
- Opening: July 15, 1995
- Closing: July 22, 1995
- Main venue: Victoria Stadium

The 1995 Island Games were the sixth edition of Island Games, and were held in the British Overseas Territory of Gibraltar, from 15 to 22 July. The Government of Gibraltar furnished Lathbury Barracks with 1,000 bunkbeds to accommodate the competing athletes. The Royal Navy had previously used the barracks as a training camp.

== Medal table ==
* Host nation (Gibraltar)

Rank	Nation	Gold	Silver	Bronze	Total
1	Jersey	37	30	32	99
2	Isle of Man	24	16	21	61
3	Guernsey	23	27	26	76
4	Isle of Wight	16	6	18	40
5	Gotland	10	17	13	40
6	Faroe Islands	10	14	15	39
7	Åland	8	12	14	34
8	Saaremaa	8	10	3	21
9	Gibraltar*	5	7	10	22
10	Iceland	5	6	9	20
11	Orkney	2	3	2	7
12	Greenland	2	0	0	2
13	(Wales) Ynys Môn/Anglesey	0	3	8	11
14	Shetland	0	1	2	3
15	Alderney	0	0	0	0
15	Falkland Islands	0	0	0	0
15	Frøya	0	0	0	0
15	Sark	0	0	0	0
Totals (18 entries)		150	152	173	475

== Sports ==
The sports chosen for the games were:

- Archery - see results
- Athletics - see results
- Badminton - see results
- Cycling - see results
- Football (1)
- Gymnastics - see results
- Judo - see results
- Sailing - see results
- Shooting - see results
- Swimming - see results
- Table tennis - see results
- Tennis - see results
- Volleyball - see results
- Windsurfing - see results
