= 2001 Island Games =

International multi-sport event

- Host: Isle of Man
- Teams: 22 islands
- Athletes: 2020
- Events: 15
- Opening: July 7, 2001
- Closing: July 13, 2001
- Opened by: Elizabeth II
- Main venue: National Stadium

The 2001 Island Games were the ninth edition of the Island Games, and were held in Isle of Man, from July 7 to 13, 2001.

== Medal table ==
* Host nation (Isle of Man)

Rank	Nation	Gold	Silver	Bronze	Total
1	Jersey	51	42	39	132
2	Isle of Man*	41	25	39	105
3	Gotland	20	14	17	51
4	Guernsey	18	38	25	81
5	Faroe Islands	15	12	13	40
6	Åland	11	13	5	29
7	Isle of Wight	11	8	16	35
8	Cayman Islands	10	8	11	29
8	Rhodes	10	8	11	29
10	Saaremaa	5	7	7	19
11	Shetland	2	6	10	18
12	Wales	2	5	2	9
13	Gibraltar	0	3	10	13
14	Greenland	0	3	1	4
15	Orkney	0	2	2	4
16	Prince Edward Island	0	0	1	1
17	Alderney	0	0	0	0
17	Falkland Islands	0	0	0	0
17	Frøya	0	0	0	0
17	Hitra Municipality	0	0	0	0
17	Saint Helena	0	0	0	0
17	Sark	0	0	0	0
Totals (22 entries)		196	194	209	599

== Sports ==
The sports chosen for the games were:

- Archery - see results
- Athletics - see results
- Badminton - see results
- Basketball - see results
- Cycling - see results
- Football (2)
- Golf - see results
- Gymnastics - see results
- Sailing - see results
- Shooting - see results
- Swimming - see results
- Table tennis - see results
- Tennis - see results
- Triathlon - see results
- Volleyball - see results
