= 1999 Island Games =

International multi-sport event

- Host: Gotland, Sweden
- Teams: 22 islands
- Athletes: 1858
- Events: 14
- Opening: June 26, 1999
- Closing: July 2, 1999
- Opened by: Carl XVI Gustaf

The 1999 Island Games were the eighth Island Games, and were held in Gotland, Sweden, from June 26 to July 2, 1999. Gotland hosted Island Games again in June 2017.

== Medal table ==
* Host nation (Host nation (Gotland))

Rank	Nation	Gold	Silver	Bronze	Total
1	Gotland (Gotland)*	37	27	29	93
2	Guernsey (GUE)	27	27	31	85
3	Jersey (JEY)	24	30	29	83
4	Isle of Man (IOM)	16	18	21	55
5	Isle of Wight (IOW)	13	17	10	40
6	Cayman Islands (CAY)	11	2	9	22
7	Åland (ALA)	9	8	7	24
8	Rhodes	8	9	4	21
9	Faroe Islands (FRO)	7	12	9	28
10	Shetland (SHE)	6	3	8	17
11	Saaremaa	4	6	10	20
12	Greenland (GRL)	4	1	2	7
13	(Wales) Ynys Môn/Anglesey	2	1	3	6
14	Gibraltar	1	5	3	9
15	Falkland Islands	1	2	3	6
16	Orkney Islands	0	1	1	2
17	Alderney	0	0	1	1
17	Saint Helena	0	0	1	1
19	Frøya	0	0	0	0
19	Hitra	0	0	0	0
19	Prince Edward Island	0	0	0	0
19	Sark	0	0	0	0
Totals (22 entries)		170	169	181	520

== Sports ==
The sports chosen for the games were:

- Archery - see results
- Athletics - see results
- Badminton - see results
- Basketball - see results
- Cycling - see results
- Football (1)
- Golf - see results
- Sailing - see results
- Shooting - see results
- Swimming - see results
- Table tennis - see results
- Ten Pin Bowling - see results
- Tennis - see results
- Volleyball - see results
