= 2007 Island Games =

International multi-sport event

- Host: Rhodes, Greece
- Teams: 25 islands
- Athletes: ~ 3000
- Events: 14
- Opening: June 30, 2007
- Closing: July 6, 2007
- Opened by: Karolos Papoulias
- Main venue: Rhodes Stadium

The 2007 Island Games were the 12th edition of the Island Games. The week-long Games were held in Rhodes, Greece, from June 30 to July 6, 2007.

== Medal count ==
* Host nation (Rhodes)

Rank	Nation	Gold	Silver	Bronze	Total
1	Jersey	30	35	27	92
2	Faroe Islands	24	19	12	55
3	Guernsey	23	23	29	75
4	Gotland	23	21	10	54
5	Rhodes*	22	14	16	52
6	Isle of Man	11	15	16	42
7	Menorca	11	9	10	30
8	Cayman Islands	11	7	5	23
9	Bermuda	8	13	19	40
10	Åland	7	8	10	25
11	Saaremaa	7	6	8	21
12	Isle of Wight	6	2	5	13
13	Prince Edward Island	4	5	7	16
14	Gibraltar	4	2	7	13
15	(Wales) Ynys Môn/Anglesey	3	1	1	5
16	Shetland	2	11	2	15
17	Greenland	1	2	0	3
18	Western Isles	1	1	4	6
19	Hitra Municipality	1	0	0	1
20	Sark	0	1	2	3
21	Orkney	0	0	4	4
22	Alderney	0	0	0	0
22	Falkland Islands	0	0	0	0
22	Frøya	0	0	0	0
22	Saint Helena	0	0	0	0
Totals (25 entries)		199	195	194	588

== Sports ==
The sports chosen for the games were:

- Archery - see results
- Athletics - see results
- Basketball (2)
- Cycling - see results
- Football - Football at the 2007 Island Games
- Golf - see results
- Judo - see results
- Sailboarding - see results
- Sailing - see results
- Shooting - see results
- Swimming - see results
- Table tennis - see results
- Tennis - see results
- Triathlon - see results
- Volleyball - see results

== See also ==
- Basketball at the 2007 Island Games
- Women's Football at the 2007 Island Games
- Men's Football at the 2007 Island Games
