= Badminton at the Island Games =

Badminton, a racquet event, has been held at the Island Games, a biennial multi-sports event for island nations, territories and dependencies.

Badminton has been included since 1985. It was not held at the 2007 Island Games.

There are limits on the number of teams and competitors that each Island can enter. The minimum age is 13.

== Events ==
| Event | I 1985 | II 1987 | III 1989 | IV 1991 | V 1993 | VI 1995 | VII 1997 | VIII 1999 | IX 2001 | X 2003 | XI 2005 | XII 2007 | XIII 2009 | XIV 2011 | XV 2013 | XVI 2015 | XVII 2017 | XVIII 2019 | XIX 2023 |
|---|---|---|---|---|---|---|---|---|---|---|---|---|---|---|---|---|---|---|---|
| Men's singles | X | X | X | X | X | X | X | X | X | X | X | X | X | X | X | X | X | X | X |
| Women's singles | X | X | X | X | X | X | X | X | X | X | X | X | X | X | X | X | X | X | X |
| Men's doubles | X | X | X | X | X | X | X | X | X | X | X | X | X | X | X | X | X | X | X |
| Women's doubles | X | X | X | X | X | X | X | X | X | X | X | X | X | X | X | X | X | X | X |
| Mixed doubles | X | X | X | X | X | X | X | X | X | X | X | X | X | X | X | X | X | X | X |
| Team | X | X | X | X | X | X | X | X | X | X | X | X | X | X | X | X | X | X | X |

== Top Medalists ==
| | Gold Medals | | Total Medals | |
| | No: | Team | No: | Team |
| Men's singles | 10 | Guernsey | 23 | Guernsey |
| Women's singles | 5 | Jersey | 20 | Guernsey |
| Men's doubles | 7 | Guernsey | 23 | Guernsey |
| Women's doubles | 6 | Guernsey Jersey | 24 | Guernsey |
| Mixed doubles | 9 | Guernsey | 29 | Guernsey |
| Team | 9 | Guernsey | 15 | Guernsey |

== Men's singles ==
Top Medalists

| | Gold Medals | | Total Medals | |
| | No: | Team | No: | Team |
| Men's' | 10; 3 | Guernsey; Greenland | 23; 13 | Guernsey; Greenland |

Results

| Year | Games | Host | | | | |
| Year | Games | Host | Gold | Silver | Bronze | Bronze |
|---|---|---|---|---|---|---|
| 1985 | I | Isle of Man | Guernsey | Guernsey | Guernsey | Shetland |
| 1987 | II | Guernsey | Guernsey | Iceland | Iceland | Iceland |
| 1989 | III | Faroe Islands | Iceland | Iceland | Isle of Wight | Jersey |
| 1991 | IV | Åland | Guernsey | Greenland | Greenland | Jersey |
| 1993 | V | Isle of Wight | Guernsey | Guernsey | Greenland | Jersey |
| 1995 | VI | Gibraltar | Guernsey | Guernsey | Guernsey | Jersey |
| 1997 | VII | Jersey | Guernsey | Guernsey | Faroe Islands | Guernsey |
| 1999 | VIII | Gotland | Guernsey | Guernsey | Greenland | Jersey |
| 2001 | IX | Isle of Man | Guernsey | Greenland | Faroe Islands | Greenland |
| 2003 | X | Guernsey | Guernsey | Guernsey | Greenland | Isle of Man |
| 2005 | XI | Shetland | Greenland | Faroe Islands | Faroe Islands | Guernsey |
| 2009 | XIII | Åland | Greenland | Greenland | Faroe Islands | Menorca |
| 2011 | XIV | Isle of Wight | Isle of Man | Greenland | Guernsey | |
| 2013 | XV | Bermuda | Guernsey | Isle of Man | Menorca | |
| 2015 | XVI | Jersey | Jersey | Faroe Islands | Faroe Islands | |
| 2017 | XVII | Gotland | Jersey | Guernsey | Jersey | |
| 2019 | XVIII | Gibraltar | Menorca | Jersey | Faroe Islands | Greenland |
| 2023 | XIX | Guernsey | Greenland | Guernsey | Faroe Islands | Faroe Islands |
| 2025 | XX | Orkney | Faroe Islands | Greenland | Isle of Man | Menorca |

== Women's singles ==
Top Medalists

| | Gold Medals | | Total Medals | |
| | No: | Team | No: | Team |
| Women's' | 5; 4 | Jersey; Guernsey | 20; 13 | Guernsey; Jersey |

Results

| Year | Games | Host | | | | |
| Year | Games | Host | Gold | Silver | Bronze | Bronze |
|---|---|---|---|---|---|---|
| 1985 | I | Isle of Man | Guernsey | Guernsey | Iceland | Isle of Man |
| 1987 | II | Guernsey | Guernsey | Guernsey | Guernsey | Isle of Wight |
| 1989 | III | Faroe Islands | Iceland | Guernsey | Isle of Man | Jersey |
| 1991 | IV | Åland | Iceland | Jersey | Isle of Wight | (Anglesey) Ynys Môn |
| 1993 | V | Isle of Wight | Iceland | Guernsey | Guernsey | (Anglesey) Ynys Môn |
| 1995 | VI | Gibraltar | Jersey | Jersey | Guernsey | Jersey |
| 1997 | VII | Jersey | Jersey | Jersey | Gotland | (Anglesey) Ynys Môn |
| 1999 | VIII | Gotland | Jersey | Jersey | Gotland | Guernsey |
| 2001 | IX | Isle of Man | Jersey | Guernsey | Gotland | Guernsey |
| 2003 | X | Guernsey | Guernsey | Gotland | Guernsey | Jersey |
| 2005 | XI | Shetland | Jersey | Guernsey | Jersey | Shetland |
| 2009 | XIII | Åland | Faroe Islands | Greenland | Isle of Man | Isle of Man |
| 2011 | XIV | Isle of Wight | Isle of Wight | Guernsey | Isle of Man | |
| 2013 | XV | Bermuda | Guernsey | Guernsey | Faroe Islands | |
| 2015 | XVI | Jersey | Faroe Islands | Isle of Man | Guernsey | |
| 2017 | XVII | Gotland | Isle of Man | Greenland | Faroe Islands | |
| 2019 | XVIII | Gibraltar | (Estonia) Saaremaa | Isle of Man | Faroe Islands | Faroe Islands |
| 2023 | XIX | Guernsey | Greenland | Isle of Man | Guernsey | Faroe Islands |
| 2025 | XX | Orkney | Faroe Islands | Greenland | Isle of Man | Isle of Wight |

== Men's doubles ==
Top Medalists

| | Gold Medals | | Total Medals | |
| | No: | Team | No: | Team |
| Men's doubles | 7; 3 | Guernsey; Faroe Islands | 23; 14 | Guernsey; Jersey |

Results

| Year | Games | Host | | | | |
| Year | Games | Host | Gold | Silver | Bronze | Bronze |
|---|---|---|---|---|---|---|
| 1985 | I | Isle of Man | Jersey | Guernsey | Guernsey | Guernsey |
| 1987 | II | Guernsey | Iceland | Jersey | Guernsey | Guernsey |
| 1989 | III | Faroe Islands | Iceland | Jersey | Faroe Islands | Isle of Man |
| 1991 | IV | Åland | Guernsey | Jersey | Greenland | IOW |
| 1993 | V | Isle of Wight | Guernsey | Guernsey | Jersey | Jersey |
| 1995 | VI | Gibraltar | Guernsey | Guernsey | Isle of Man | Jersey |
| 1997 | VII | Jersey | Guernsey | Guernsey | Greenland | Jersey |
| 1999 | VIII | Gotland | Guernsey | Guernsey | Greenland | Jersey |
| 2001 | IX | Isle of Man | Guernsey | Greenland | Gotland | Shetland |
| 2003 | X | Guernsey | Guernsey | Guernsey | Greenland | Greenland |
| 2005 | XI | Shetland | Jersey | Greenland | Guernsey | Shetland |
| 2009 | XIII | Åland | Faroe Islands | Greenland | Gotland | Isle of Man |
| 2011 | XIV | Isle of Wight | Faroe Islands | Guernsey | Isle of Man | |
| 2013 | XV | Bermuda | Greenland | Guernsey | Menorca | |
| 2015 | XVI | Jersey | Greenland | Menorca | Jersey | |
| 2017 | XVII | Gotland | Menorca | Greenland | Jersey | |
| 2019 | XVIII | Gibraltar | Menorca | Jersey | Guernsey | Guernsey |
| 2023 | XIX | Guernsey | Faroe Islands | Menorca | Guernsey | Jersey |
| 2025 | XX | Orkney | Faroe Islands | Guernsey | Greenland | Menorca |

== Women's doubles ==
Top Medalists

| | Gold Medals | | Total Medals | |
| | No: | Team | No: | Team |
| Women's doubles | 6 | Guernsey; Jersey | 24; 12 | Guernsey; Jersey |

Results

| Year | Games | Host | | | | |
| Year | Games | Host | Gold | Silver | Bronze | Bronze |
|---|---|---|---|---|---|---|
| 1985 | I | Isle of Man | Guernsey | Guernsey | Iceland | Isle of Man |
| 1987 | II | Guernsey | Guernsey | Guernsey | Jersey | |
| 1989 | III | Faroe Islands | Jersey | Isle of Wight | Guernsey | Iceland |
| 1991 | IV | Åland | Guernsey | Guernsey | Iceland | Jersey |
| 1993 | V | Isle of Wight | Isle of Wight | Iceland | Guernsey | Jersey |
| 1995 | VI | Gibraltar | Jersey | Guernsey | Guernsey | Isle of Man |
| 1997 | VII | Jersey | Jersey | Guernsey | Isle of Man | Jersey |
| 1999 | VIII | Gotland | Jersey | Guernsey | Jersey | Shetland |
| 2001 | IX | Isle of Man | Jersey | Guernsey | Guernsey | Gotland |
| 2003 | X | Guernsey | Guernsey | Guernsey | Gotland | Shetland |
| 2005 | XI | Shetland | Jersey | Guernsey | Greenland | Shetland |
| 2009 | XIII | Åland | Guernsey | Faroe Islands | Isle of Man | Jersey |
| 2011 | XIV | Isle of Wight | Guernsey | Guernsey | Isle of Man | |
| 2013 | XV | Bermuda | Isle of Man | Faroe Islands | Guernsey | |
| 2015 | XVI | Jersey | Isle of Man | Gotland | Faroe Islands | |
| 2017 | XVII | Gotland | Isle of Man | Gotland | Guernsey | |
| 2019 | XVIII | Gibraltar | Isle of Man | Guernsey | Greenland | Greenland |
| 2023 | XIX | Guernsey | Isle of Man | Faroe Islands | Faroe Islands | Guernsey |
| 2025 | XX | Orkney | Faroe Islands | Isle of Man | Faroe Islands | Orkney |

== Mixed doubles ==
Top Medalists

| | Gold Medals | | Total Medals | |
| | No: | Team | No: | Team |
| Mixed doubles | 9; 6 | Guernsey; Jersey | 29; 14 | Guernsey; Jersey |

Results

| Year | Games | Host | | | | |
| Year | Games | Host | Gold | Silver | Bronze | Bronze |
|---|---|---|---|---|---|---|
| 1985 | I | Isle of Man | Jersey | Jersey | Guernsey | Isle of Man |
| 1987 | II | Guernsey | Jersey | Guernsey | Guernsey | |
| 1989 | III | Faroe Islands | Jersey | Iceland | Guernsey | Isle of Man |
| 1991 | IV | Åland | Jersey | Isle of Wight | Guernsey | Guernsey |
| 1993 | V | Isle of Wight | Guernsey | Jersey | Guernsey | Isle of Wight |
| 1995 | VI | Gibraltar | Guernsey | Guernsey | Guernsey | Jersey |
| 1997 | VII | Jersey | Guernsey | Guernsey | Jersey | Jersey |
| 1999 | VIII | Gotland | Guernsey | Jersey | Gotland | Jersey |
| 2001 | IX | Isle of Man | Guernsey | Greenland | Isle of Man | Shetland |
| 2003 | X | Guernsey | Guernsey | Guernsey | Guernsey | Isle of Man |
| 2005 | XI | Shetland | Jersey | Shetland | Guernsey | Jersey |
| 2009 | XIII | Åland | Jersey | Guernsey | Greenland | Isle of Man |
| 2011 | XIV | Isle of Wight | Guernsey | Faroe Islands | Isle of Wight | |
| 2013 | XV | Bermuda | Faroe Islands | Guernsey | Isle of Man | |
| 2015 | XVI | Jersey | Gotland | Shetland | Guernsey | |
| 2017 | XVII | Gotland | Guernsey | Guernsey | Faroe Islands | |
| 2019 | XVIII | Gibraltar | Guernsey | Guernsey | Faroe Islands | Guernsey |
| 2023 | XIX | Guernsey | Faroe Islands | Faroe Islands | Isle of Man | Guernsey |
| 2025 | XX | Orkney | Faroe Islands | Faroe Islands | Isle of Man | Greenland |

== Team ==
Top Medalists

| | Gold Medals | | Total Medals | |
| | No: | Team | No: | Team |
| Team | 9; 5 | Guernsey; Jersey | 16; 11 | Guernsey; Jersey |

Results

| Year | Games | Host | | | |
| Year | Games | Host | Gold | Silver | Bronze |
|---|---|---|---|---|---|
| 1985 | I | Isle of Man | Guernsey | Jersey | Isle of Wight |
| 1987 | II | Guernsey | Guernsey | Iceland | Jersey |
| 1989 | III | Faroe Islands | Iceland | Guernsey | Jersey |
| 1991 | IV | Åland | Guernsey | Jersey | Isle of Man |
| 1993 | V | Isle of Wight | Guernsey | Jersey | Isle of Wight |
| 1995 | VI | Gibraltar | Jersey | Guernsey | Isle of Man |
| 1997 | VII | Jersey | Jersey | Guernsey | Shetland |
| 1999 | VIII | Gotland | Jersey | Guernsey | Gotland |
| 2001 | IX | Isle of Man | Guernsey | Jersey | Gotland |
| 2003 | X | Guernsey | Guernsey | Greenland | Shetland |
| 2005 | XI | Shetland | Jersey | Shetland | Guernsey |
| 2009 | XIII | Åland | Faroe Islands | Greenland | Gotland |
| 2011 | XIV | Isle of Wight | Guernsey | Isle of Man | Faroe Islands |
| 2013 | XV | Bermuda | Guernsey | Isle of Man | Faroe Islands |
| 2015 | XVI | Jersey | Jersey | Faroe Islands | Isle of Man |
| 2017 | XVII | Gotland | Guernsey | Jersey | Isle of Man |
| 2019 | XVIII | Gibraltar | Greenland | Guernsey | Faroe Islands |
| 2023 | XIX | Guernsey | Faroe Islands | Greenland | Guernsey |
| 2025 | XX | Orkney | Greenland | Faroe Islands | Isle of Man |

== Gold Medal Winners ==
=== Individual competition ===
| Year | Men's singles | Women's singles | Men's doubles | Women's doubles | Mixed doubles |
|---|---|---|---|---|---|
| 1985 | (Guernsey) Mark Leadbeater | (Guernsey) Sally Podger | (Jersey) Steve Watson (Jersey) Ian Goodfellow | (Guernsey) Sally Podger (Guernsey) Wendy Luxton | (Jersey) Steve Watson (Jersey) Jean Lawson |
| 1987 | (Guernsey) Jimmy McKenna | (Guernsey) Sally Podger | (Iceland) Armann Thorvaldsson (Iceland) Adolfsson | (Guernsey) Sally Podger (Guernsey) Wendy Luxton | (Jersey) Steve Watson (Jersey) Jean Lawson |
| 1989 | (Iceland) Armann Thorvaldsson | (Iceland) Thordis Edwald | (Iceland) Armann Thorvaldsson (Iceland) Snorri Ingvarsson | (Jersey) Jean Lawson (Jersey) Sally Adams | (Jersey) Steve Watson (Jersey) Jean Lawson |
| 1991 | (Guernsey) Jimmy McKenna | (Iceland) Gudrún Júlíusdóttír | (Guernsey) Jimmy McKenna (Guernsey) Mark Leadbeater | (Guernsey) Wendy Trebert (Guernsey) Sarah Le Moigne | (Jersey) Steve Watson (Jersey) Sally Adams |
| 1993 | (Guernsey) Darren Le Tissier | (Iceland) Elsan Nielsen | (Guernsey) Darren Le Tissier (Guernsey) Ifthi Wangsa | (Isle of Wight) Sharon Hutchins (Isle of Wight) Nichola Hutchins | (Guernsey) Darren Le Tissier (Guernsey) Bridget Hunt |
| 1995 | (Guernsey) Mark Leadbeater | (Jersey) Elizabeth Cann | (Guernsey) Darren Le Tissier (Guernsey) Mark Leadbeater | (Jersey) Elizabeth Cann (Jersey) Danielle Le Feuvre | (Guernsey) Mark Leadbeater (Guernsey) Sarah Le Moigne |
| 1997 | (Guernsey) Glenn MacFarlane | (Jersey) Elizabeth Cann | (Guernsey) Glenn MacFarlane (Guernsey) Mark Leadbeater | (Jersey) Elizabeth Cann (Jersey) Danielle Le Feuvre | (Guernsey) Mark Leadbeater (Guernsey) Sarah Le Moigne |
| 1999 | (Guernsey) Darren Le Tissier | (Jersey) Danielle Le Feuvre | (Guernsey) Darren Le Tissier (Guernsey) Glenn MacFarlane | (Jersey) Kerry Duffin (Jersey) Danielle Le Feuvre | (Guernsey) Glenn MacFarlane (Guernsey) Sarah Le Moigne |
| 2001 | (Guernsey) Glenn MacFarlane | (Jersey) Kerry Duffin | (Guernsey) Glenn MacFarlane (Guernsey) Paul Le Tocq | (Jersey) Kerry Duffin (Jersey) Krystle Matthews | (Guernsey) Glenn MacFarlane (Guernsey) Sarah Le Moigne |
| 2003 | (Guernsey) Darren Le Tissier | (Guernsey) Elena Johnson | (Guernsey) Darren Le Tissier (Guernsey) Kevin Le Moigne | (Guernsey) Sarah Garbutt (Guernsey) Sally Wood | (Guernsey) Darren Le Tissier (Guernsey) Wendy Trebert |
| 2005 | (Greenland) Bror Madsen | (Jersey) Mariana Agathangelou | (Jersey) Anton Kriel (Jersey) Chris Cotillard | (Jersey) Mariana Agathangelou (Jersey) Kerry Coombs-Goodfellow | (Jersey) Chris Cotillard (Jersey) Mariana Agathangelou |
| 2007 | No competition | | | | |
| 2009 | (Greenland) Frederik Kjærholm Elsner | (Faroe Islands) Sigrun Smith | (Faroe Islands) Aksel Poulsen (Faroe Islands) Bjartur Lamhauge | (Guernsey) Gayle Lloyd (Guernsey) Kiara Green | (Jersey) Chris Cotillard (Jersey) Kimberly Ashton |
| 2011 | (Isle of Man) Joshua Green | (Isle of Wight) Anna Showan | (Faroe Islands) Niclas Højgaard Eysturoy (Faroe Islands) Aksel Poulsen | (Guernsey) Gayle Lloyd (Guernsey) Kiara Green | (Guernsey) Sarah Garbutt (Guernsey) Paul Le Tocq |
| 2013 | (Guernsey) Paul Le Tocq | (Guernsey) Elena Johnson | (Greenland) Bror Madsen (Greenland) Taatsiannguaq Pedersen | (Isle of Man) Kimberley Clague (Isle of Man) Cristen Marritt née Callow | (Faroe Islands) Rannvá Djurhuus Carlsson (Faroe Islands) Niclas Højgaard Eysturoy |
| 2015 | (Jersey) Mark Constable | (Faroe Islands) Rannvá Djurhuus Carlsson | (Greenland) Bror Madsen (Greenland) Jens Frederik Nielsen | (Isle of Man) Kimberley Clague (Isle of Man) Cristen Marritt née Callow | (Gotland) Bjorn Erikson (Gotland) Caroline Gate |
| 2017 | (Jersey) Mark Constable | (Isle of Man) Jessica Li | (Menorca) Eric Navarro (Menorca) Albert Navarro | (Isle of Man) Kimberley Clague (Isle of Man) Jessica Li | (Guernsey) Ove Svejstrup (Guernsey) Elena Johnson |
| 2019 | (Menorca) Eric Navarro | (Estonia) Getter Saar | (Menorca) Eric Navarro (Menorca) Albert Navarro | (Isle of Man) Kimberley Clague (Isle of Man) Jessica Li | (Guernsey) Jordan Trebert (Guernsey) Emily Trebert |
| 2023 | (Greenland) Jens Frederik Nielsen | (Greenland) Sara Jacobsen | (Faroe Islands) Wong Fai Yin (Faroe Islands) Magnus Dal-Christiansen | (Isle of Man) Kimberley Clague (Isle of Man) Jessica Li | (Faroe Islands) Wong Fai Yin (Faroe Islands) Mia Thorkildshøj |
| 2025 | (Faroe Islands) Rúni Øster | (Faroe Islands) Miriam í Grótinum | (Faroe Islands) Rúni Øster (Faroe Islands) Magnus Dal-Christiansen | (Faroe Islands) Miriam í Grótinum (Faroe Islands) Bjarnhild í Buð Justinussen | (Faroe Islands) Rúni Øster (Faroe Islands) Miriam í Grótinum |

== Successful Gold Medal winners ==
Below is the list of the most ever successful players in badminton at the Island Games:

| Name | MS | WS | MD | WD | XD | Total |
|---|---|---|---|---|---|---|
| (Guernsey) Darren Le Tissier | 3 | | 4 | | 2 | 9 |
| (Guernsey) Sarah Garbutt née Le Moigne | | | | 3 | 5 | 8 |
| (Guernsey) Mark Leadbeater | 2 | | 3 | | 2 | 7 |
| (Guernsey) Glenn MacFarlane | 2 | | 3 | | 2 | 7 |
| (Guernsey) Sally Wood née Podger | | 2 | | 3 | | 5 |
| (Jersey) Steve Watson | | | 1 | | 4 | 5 |
| (Isle of Man) Kimberley Clague | | | | 5 | | 5 |
| (Jersey) Elizabeth Cann | | 2 | | 2 | | 4 |
| (Jersey) Danielle Le Feuvre | | 1 | | 3 | | 4 |
| (Jersey) Jean Lawson | | | | 1 | 3 | 4 |
| (Isle of Man) Jessica Li | | 1 | | 3 | | 4 |
| (Jersey) Mariana Agathangelou | | 1 | | 1 | 1 | 3 |
| (Iceland) Armann Thorvaldsson | 1 | | 2 | | | 3 |
| (Jersey) Chris Cotillard | | | 1 | | 2 | 3 |
| (Greenland) Bror Madsen | 1 | | 2 | | | 3 |
| (Guernsey) Paul Le Tocq | 1 | | 1 | | 1 | 3 |
| (Guernsey) Elena Johnson | | 2 | | | 1 | 3 |
| (Menorca) Eric Navarro | 1 | | 2 | | | 3 |
