= Volleyball at the Island Games =

Volleyball is an event at the Island Games, the biennial multi-sports event for island nations, territories and dependencies.

Volleyball has been selected as a sport in every Island Games for both Men and Women since the games were started in 1985.

Beach Volleyball being introduced for the first time in 2007.

Volleyball

- A maximum of one Team per gender may be entered by each Member Island
- Each team may have 12 competitors and 5 bench personnel
- Age - 13 minimum

Beach Volleyball

- A maximum of one Team per gender may be entered by each Member Island
- Each team comprises 2 competitors per Member Island
- Age - 13 minimum

== Events ==
Event	I 1985	II 1987	III 1989	IV 1991	V 1993	VI 1995	VII 1997	VIII 1999	IX 2001	X 2003	XI 2005	XII 2007	XIII 2009	XIV 2011	XV 2013	XVI 2015	XVII 2017	XVIII 2019	XIX
Men's tournament	X	X	X	X	X	X	X	X	X	X	X	X	X	X	X	X	X		
Women's tournament	X	X	X	X	X	X	X	X	X	X	X	X	X	X	X	X	X		
Men's beach volleyball												X			X	X	X	X	
Women's beach volleyball												X			X	X	X	X	

== Top Medalists ==
	Gold Medals		Total Medals	
	No:	Team	No:	Team
Men's Volleyball	8	Saaremaa Åland	14	Åland Saaremaa
Women's Volleyball	7	Faroe Islands Saaremaa	16	Faroe Islands
Men's Beach Volleyball	1	Cayman Islands Gotland; Saaremaa Åland Islands	3	Gotland Saaremaa
Women's Beach Volleyball	2	Menorca	4	Menorca

== Volleyball ==
=== Men's Volleyball ===
Year	Games	Host			
Year	Games	Host	Gold	Silver	Bronze
1985	I	Isle of Man	Åland	Iceland	Faroe Islands
1987	II	Guernsey	Åland	Faroe Islands	Gibraltar
1989	III	Faroe Islands	Faroe Islands	Guernsey	Iceland
1991	IV	Åland	Saaremaa	Åland	Faroe Islands
1993	V	Isle of Wight	Åland	Saaremaa	Faroe Islands
1995	VI	Gibraltar	Åland	Saaremaa	Faroe Islands
1997	VII	Jersey	Åland	Saaremaa	Gotland
1999	VIII	Gotland	Åland	Saaremaa	Faroe Islands
2001	IX	Isle of Man	Åland	Gotland	Saaremaa
2003	X	Guernsey	Saaremaa	Faroe Islands	Åland
2005	XI	Shetland	Saaremaa	Bermuda	Faroe Islands
2007	XII	Rhodes	Saaremaa	Faroe Islands	Rhodes
2009	XIII	Åland	Saaremaa	Åland	Greenland
2011	XIV	Isle of Wight	Saaremaa	Faroe Islands	Åland
2013	XV	Bermuda	Saaremaa	Åland	Bermuda
2015	XVI	Jersey	Saaremaa	Faroe Islands	Åland
2017	XVII	Gotland	Åland	Saaremaa	Faroe Islands

=== Women's Volleyball ===
Year	Games	Host			
Year	Games	Host	Gold	Silver	Bronze
1985	I	Isle of Man	Åland	Faroe Islands	Iceland
1987	II	Guernsey	Faroe Islands	Guernsey	Åland
1989	III	Faroe Islands	Iceland	Faroe Islands	Åland
1991	IV	Åland	Saaremaa	Åland	Faroe Islands
1993	V	Isle of Wight	Saaremaa	Åland	Faroe Islands
1995	VI	Gibraltar	Saaremaa	Faroe Islands	Åland
1997	VII	Jersey	Saaremaa	Åland	Faroe Islands
1999	VIII	Gotland	Faroe Islands	Åland	Saaremaa
2001	IX	Isle of Man	Faroe Islands	Saaremaa	Guernsey
2003	X	Guernsey	Faroe Islands	Saaremaa	Greenland
2005	XI	Shetland	Faroe Islands	Saaremaa	Åland
2007	XII	Rhodes	Saaremaa	Faroe Islands	Menorca
2009	XIII	Åland	Faroe Islands	Saaremaa	Menorca
2011	XIV	Isle of Wight	Saaremaa	Faroe Islands	Menorca
2013	XV	Bermuda	Faroe Islands	Saaremaa	Greenland
2015	XVI	Jersey	Saaremaa	Faroe Islands	Menorca

== Beach Volleyball ==
=== Men's Beach Volleyball ===
Year	Games	Host			
Year	Games	Host	Gold	Silver	Bronze
2007	XII	Rhodes	Cayman Islands	Gotland	Rhodes
2013	XV	Bermuda	Saaremaa	Cayman Islands	Menorca
2015	XVI	Jersey	Gotland	Saaremaa	Jersey
2019	XVIII	Gibraltar	Åland Islands	Gotland	Saaremaa

=== Women's Beach Volleyball ===
Year	Games	Host			
Year	Games	Host	Gold	Silver	Bronze
2007	XII	Rhodes	Menorca	Rhodes	Saaremaa
2013	XV	Bermuda	Menorca	Cayman Islands	Gotland
2015	XVI	Jersey	Cayman Islands	Saaremaa	Menorca
2019	XVIII	Gibraltar	Gotland	Menorca	Cayman Islands
