= Swimming at the Island Games =

Biennial multi-sports event

Swimming is an event at the Island Games, the biennial multi-sports event for island nations, territories and dependencies. Swimming at the Island Games started in 1985 and has been a sport in the games on every occasion since then. Minimum age to compete is 13

== Events ==
The swimming events at the 1985 Island Games were swum in a 33m pool. All other games that were hosted had swimming events in 25m short course swimming pools.

Event		I 1985	II	III	IV	V	VI 1995	VII	VIII	IX	X	XI 2005	XII	XIII	XIV	XV	XVI 2015	XVII	XVIII	XVIII 2023
Freestyle
Freestyle	50m freestyle	X	X	X	X	X	X	X	X	X	X	X	X	X	X	X	X	X	X	X
Freestyle	100m freestyle	X	X	X	X	X	X	X	X	X	X	X	X	X	X	X	X	X	X	X
Freestyle	200m freestyle	X	X	X	X	X	X	X	X	X	X	X	X	X	X	X	X	X	X	X
Freestyle	400m freestyle			X	X	X	X	X	X	X	X	X	X	X	X	X	X	X	X	X
Freestyle	800m freestyle							X	X	X	X	X	X	X	X	X	X	X	X	X
Freestyle	1500m freestyle							X	X	X	X	X	X	X	X	X	X	X	X	X
Backstroke
Backstroke	50m backstroke		X	X	X	X	X	X	X	X	X	X	X	X	X	X	X	X	X	X
Backstroke	100m backstroke	X	X	X	X	X	X	X	X	X	X	X	X	X	X	X	X	X	X	X
Backstroke	200m backstroke			X	X	X	X	X	X	X	X	X	X	X	X	X	X	X	X	X
Breaststroke
Breaststroke	50m breaststroke		X	X	X	X	X	X	X	X	X	X	X	X	X	X	X	X	X	X
Breaststroke	100m breaststroke	X	X	X	X	X	X	X	X	X	X	X	X	X	X	X	X	X	X	X
Breaststroke	200m breaststroke			X	X	X	X	X	X	X	X	X	X	X	X	X	X	X	X	X
Butterfly
Butterfly	50m butterfly		X	X	X	X	X	X	X	X	X	X	X	X	X	X	X	X	X	X
Butterfly	100m butterfly	X	X	X	X	X	X	X	X	X	X	X	X	X	X	X	X	X	X	X
Butterfly	200m butterfly			X	X	X	X	X	X	X	X	X	X	X	X	X	X	X	X	X
Individual medley
Individual medley	100m individual medley											X	X	X	X	X	X	X	X	X
Individual medley	200m individual medley	X	X	X	X	X	X	X	X	X	X	X	X	X	X	X	X	X	X	X
Individual medley	400m individual medley					X	X	X	X	X	X	X	X	X	X	X	X	X	X	X
Team relay
Team relay	4x50m freestyle relay	X	X	X	X	X	X	X	X	X	X	X	X	X	X	X	X	X	X	X
Team relay	4x50m medley relay	X	X	X	X	X	X	X	X	X	X	X	X	X	X	X	X	X	X	X
Team relay	4x100m freestyle relay				X	X	X	X	X	X	X	X	X	X	X	X	X	X	X	X
Team relay	4x100m medley relay					X	X	X	X	X	X	X	X	X	X	X	X	X	X	X
Team relay	8x50m freestyle relay				X	X	X	X	X	X	X	X	X	X	X	X	X	X	X	

== Top Medalists ==
NGR New Games Record

	Gold Medals		Total Medals	
	No:	Team	No:	Team
Men's 50m Men's 100m Men's 200m Men's 400m Men's 1500m Men's Relay Team	16; 22; 26; 11; 7; 19	Isle of Man; Jersey; Jersey; Jersey; Faroe Islands; Jersey	41; 57; 71; 32; 14; 53	Jersey; Guernsey; Jersey; Jersey; Jersey; Jersey
Mixed Relay Team	5	Jersey	14	Guernsey
Women's 50m Women's 100m Women's 200m Women's 400m Women's 800m Women's Relay Team	19; 19; 24; 8; 5; 24	Jersey; Jersey; Jersey; Jersey; Faroe Islands; Jersey	48; 56; 72; 25; 10; 56	Jersey; Guernsey; Guernsey; Guernsey; Cayman Islands; Guernsey

== Men's Results ==
=== Men's 50m ===
Top Medalists

	Gold Medals		Total Medals	
	No:	Team	No:	Team
Men's 50m	16; 14; 11	Isle of Man; Jersey; Guernsey	41; 37; 35	Jersey; Faroe Islands; Guernsey

Results

Year	Games	Host	Event	Gold	Silver	Bronze				
Year	Games	Host	Event	1985	I	Isle of Man	66m Freestyle	Isle of Wight	Faroe Islands	Guernsey
1987	II	Faroe Islands	Freestyle	Jersey	Gibraltar	Faroe Islands				
1989	III	Faroe Islands	Backstroke; Breaststroke; Butterfly; Freestyle	Orkney Islands; Isle of Man; Isle of Man NGR; Faroe Islands	Iceland; Isle of Man; Faroe Islands; Isle of Man	Guernsey; Faroe Islands; Isle of Wight; Isle of Wight				
1991	IV	Åland	Freestyle	Isle of Man	Isle of Wight	Faroe Islands				
1993	V	Isle of Wight	Backstroke; Breaststroke; Butterfly; Freestyle	Isle of Man; Gibraltar; Isle of Man; Isle of Man	Jersey; Faroe Islands; Isle of Wight; Gotland	Åland; Jersey; Gotland; Åland				
1995	VI	Gibraltar	Backstroke; Breaststroke; Butterfly; Freestyle	Åland NGR; Faroe Islands; Guernsey; Orkney Islands NGR	Jersey; Orkney Islands; Iceland; Faroe Islands	Isle of Man; Jersey; Isle of Wight; Guernsey				
1997	VII	Jersey	Backstroke; Breaststroke; Butterfly; Freestyle	Jersey NGR; Isle of Wight NGR; Isle of Man; Guernsey NGR	Guernsey; Isle of Man; Faroe Islands; Faroe Islands	Isle of Man; Jersey; Isle of Man; Isle of Man				
1999	VIII	Gotland	Backstroke; Breaststroke; Butterfly; Freestyle	Isle of Man; Isle of Man; Faroe Islands; Guernsey	Isle of Wight; Isle of Wight; Faroe Islands; Faroe Islands	Faroe Islands; Faroe Islands; Isle of Wight; Jersey				
2001	IX	Isle of Man	Backstroke; Breaststroke; Butterfly; Freestyle	Jersey NGR; Faroe Islands; Isle of Man NGR; Jersey NGR	Cayman Islands; Isle of Man; Jersey (Anglesey) Ynys Môn	Isle of Man; Isle of Wight; Faroe Islands; Isle of Man				
2003	X	Guernsey	Backstroke; Breaststroke; Butterfly; Freestyle	Cayman Islands; Faroe Islands; Jersey; Bermuda	Jersey; Jersey; Jersey; Jersey	Isle of Wight; Bermuda; Guernsey (Anglesey) Ynys Môn				
2005	XI	Shetland	Backstroke; Breaststroke; Butterfly; Freestyle	Guernsey NGR; Guernsey; Jersey NGR; Jersey NGR	Jersey; Gibraltar; Guernsey; Faroe Islands	Jersey; Isle of Man; Jersey; Jersey				
2007	XII	Rhodes	Backstroke; Breaststroke; Butterfly; Freestyle	Cayman Islands; Jersey; Prince Edward Island NGR; Gotland NGR	Jersey; Jersey; Prince Edward Island; Prince Edward Island	Prince Edward Island; Faroe Islands; Jersey; Guernsey				
2009	XIII	Åland	Backstroke; Breaststroke; Butterfly; Freestyle	Isle of Man NGR; Jersey; Faroe Islands; Faroe Islands Gotland NGR	Faroe Islands; Faroe Islands; Isle of Man	Guernsey; Isle of Wight; Faroe Islands; Faroe Islands				
2011	XIV	Isle of Wight	Backstroke; Breaststroke; Butterfly; Freestyle	Guernsey NGR; Isle of Wight; Faroe Islands NGR; Faroe Islands	Faroe Islands; Isle of Wight Faroe Islands; Guernsey; Guernsey	Jersey Guernsey; Faroe Islands				
2013	XV	Bermuda	Backstroke; Breaststroke; Butterfly; Freestyle	Isle of Man NGR; Jersey; Cayman Islands NGR; Cayman Islands NGR	Jersey; Saaremaa; Cayman Islands; Guernsey	Guernsey; Jersey; Guernsey; Cayman Islands				
2015	XVI	Jersey	Backstroke; Breaststroke; Butterfly; Freestyle	Guernsey; Jersey NGR; Cayman Islands; Guernsey	Jersey; Faroe Islands; Cayman Islands; Jersey	Jersey; Isle of Man; Guernsey; Faroe Islands				
2017	XVII	Gotland	Backstroke; Breaststroke; Butterfly; Freestyle	Guernsey; Isle of Man; Saaremaa; Guernsey	Saaremaa; Faroe Islands; Guernsey; Guernsey	Guernsey; Isle of Man; Åland; Isle of Wight				
2019	XVIII	Gibraltar	Backstroke; Breaststroke; Butterfly; Freestyle	Jersey NGR; Faroe Islands; Jersey; Isle of Man	Guernsey; Guernsey; Isle of Man; Guernsey	Cayman Islands; Guernsey; Faroe Islands; Cayman Islands				
2023	XIX	Guernsey	Backstroke; Breaststroke; Butterfly; Freestyle	Jersey; Guernsey; Isle of Man; Isle of Man	Guernsey; Guernsey; Isle of Man; Jersey	Isle of Man; Faroe Islands; Jersey; Jersey				

=== Men's 100m ===
Top Medalists

	Gold Medals		Total Medals	
	No:	Team	No:	Team
Men's 100m	22; 18; 17	Jersey; IOM; Guernsey	57; 53; 42	Guernsey; Jersey; IOM

Results

Year	Games	Host	Event	Gold	Silver	Bronze				
Year	Games	Host	Event	1985	I	Isle of Man	Backstroke; Breaststroke; Butterfly; Freestyle	Jersey; IOM; Jersey; Jersey	IOW; IOW; IOW; Guernsey	IOM; Faroe Islands; IOM; IOW
1987	II	Guernsey	Backstroke; Breaststroke; Butterfly; Freestyle	IOW; IOM; IOM; IOM	Guernsey; IOM; Jersey; Guernsey	IOW; Faroe Islands; Faroe Islands; Faroe Islands				
1989	III	Faroe Islands	Backstroke; Breaststroke; Butterfly; Freestyle	Iceland; Faroe Islands; IOM; IOM NGR	Iceland; IOM; Iceland; Guernsey	Orkney Islands; IOM; IOW; Iceland				
1991	IV	Åland	Backstroke; Breaststroke; Butterfly; Freestyle	Iceland; Faroe Islands; IOM; IOM	Orkney Islands; Gibraltar; IOW; IOW	Faroe Islands; Faroe Islands; IOW; Faroe Islands				
1993	V	IOW	Backstroke; Breaststroke; Butterfly; Freestyle	IOM; Faroe Islands; IOW NGR; Gotland	Jersey; Jersey; Gotland; IOM	Jersey; IOW; Orkney Islands; Faroe Islands				
1995	VI	Gibraltar	Backstroke; Breaststroke; Butterfly; Freestyle	Jersey NGR; Faroe Islands NGR; IOW; Guernsey	IOM; IOW; Jersey; Jersey	Åland; Faroe Islands; Iceland; Iceland				
1997	VII	Jersey	Backstroke; Breaststroke; Butterfly; Freestyle	Jersey NGR; IOW NGR; IOM NGR; Guernsey NGR	Jersey; IOM; Jersey; IOM	IOM; Jersey; Guernsey; Jersey				
1999	VIII	Gotland	Backstroke; Breaststroke; Butterfly; Freestyle	IOM; IOW; IOM; Guernsey	Jersey; IOW; IOW; IOM	IOW; IOM; Guernsey; Guernsey				
2001	IX	Isle of Man	Backstroke; Breaststroke; Butterfly; Freestyle	Cayman Islands; Jersey; Jersey NGR; Jersey NGR	Jersey; Faroe Islands; IOM (Anglesey) Ynys Môn	IOM; IOW; IOW; Faroe Islands				
2003	X	Guernsey	Backstroke; Breaststroke; Butterfly; Freestyle	Cayman Islands; Jersey; Jersey (Anglesey) Ynys Môn	Guernsey; Bermuda; Cayman Islands; Bermuda	Jersey; Faroe Islands; Bermuda; Jersey				
2005	XI	Shetland	Backstroke; Breaststroke; Butterfly; Freestyle; Medley	Guernsey NGR; Jersey; Jersey NGR; Jersey NGR; Guernsey NGR	Guernsey; Jersey; Guernsey; Guernsey; Guernsey	Jersey; Guernsey; Guernsey; Guernsey; Jersey				
2007	XII	Rhodes	Backstroke; Breaststroke; Butterfly; Freestyle; Medley	Cayman Islands; Jersey; Jersey; Guernsey; Guernsey	Faroe Islands; Jersey; Prince Edward Island; Gotland; Guernsey	Jersey; IOM; Guernsey; Faroe Islands; Gotland				
2009	XIII	Åland	Backstroke; Breaststroke; Butterfly; Freestyle; Medley	IOM NGR; Jersey; Guernsey; Faroe Islands NGR; Guernsey NGR	Faroe Islands; IOW; IOM; Guernsey; Faroe Islands	Guernsey; Faroe Islands; Guernsey; Gotland; Jersey				
2011	XIV	Isle of Wight	Backstroke; Breaststroke; Butterfly; Freestyle; Medley	Guernsey NGR; IOW NGR; Guernsey NGR; Faroe Islands; Guernsey NGR	Faroe Islands; Guernsey; Guernsey; Jersey; Faroe Islands	Guernsey; Faroe Islands; Faroe Islands; Guernsey; Guernsey				
2013	XV	Bermuda	Backstroke; Breaststroke; Butterfly; Freestyle; Medley	IOM; Jersey NGR; Cayman Islands NGR; Cayman Islands NGR; IOM NGR	Jersey; Jersey; Cayman Islands; Cayman Islands; Jersey	Guernsey; Guernsey; IOM; Guernsey; Saaremaa				
2015	XVI	Jersey	Backstroke; Breaststroke; Butterfly; Freestyle; Medley	Guernsey NGR; Jersey NGR; Cayman Islands; Cayman Islands; Cayman Islands NGR	Jersey; Faroe Islands; Cayman Islands; Cayman Islands; Guernsey	Jersey; IOM; Guernsey; Guernsey; Jersey				
2017	XVII	Gotland	Backstroke; Breaststroke; Butterfly; Freestyle; Medley	Guernsey; IOM; Guernsey; Guernsey; Saaremaa	Saaremaa; Faroe Islands; IOM; IOM; Guernsey	Guernsey; Faroe Islands; Åland; Guernsey; Faroe Islands				
2019	XVIII	Gibraltar	Backstroke; Breaststroke; Butterfly; Freestyle; Medley	Jersey NGR; Faroe Islands; Jersey; Cayman Islands; IOM	Guernsey; Guernsey; Guernsey; IOM; IOM	Cayman Islands; Jersey; Shetland; IOM; Jersey				
2023	XIX	Guernsey	Backstroke; Breaststroke; Butterfly; Freestyle; Medley	Jersey; Guernsey; IOM; IOM; Jersey	Guernsey; Guernsey; Jersey; Jersey; Guernsey	Cayman Islands; Faroe Islands; Cayman Islands; Faroe Islands; Guernsey				

=== Men's 200m ===
Top Medalists

	Gold Medals		Total Medals	
	No:	Team	No:	Team
Men's 200m	26; 17; 14	Jersey; Guernsey; Faroe Islands	71; 57; 44	Jersey; Guernsey; Faroe Islands

Results

Year	Games	Host	Event	Gold	Silver	Bronze				
Year	Games	Host	Event	1985	I	Isle of Man	Freestyle; Medley	IOM; Jersey	IOW; IOM	IOM; IOW
1987	II	Guernsey	Freestyle; Medley	Guernsey; IOM	IOW; IOM	Faroe Islands; IOW				
1989	III	Faroe Islands	Backstroke; Breaststroke; Butterfly; Freestyle; Medley	Iceland; Faroe Islands; IOM; IOM; Faroe Islands	Iceland; IOM; Iceland; Guernsey; Jersey	Guernsey; Iceland; IOW; Faroe Islands; Jersey				
1991	IV	Åland	Backstroke; Breaststroke; Butterfly; Freestyle; Medley	Iceland; Faroe Islands; Gibraltar; IOM; Jersey	Orkney Islands; Gibraltar; IOW; IOW; Faroe Islands	Jersey; IOW; Faroe Islands; Iceland; Jersey				
1993	V	IOW	Backstroke; Breaststroke; Butterfly; Freestyle; Medley	Jersey; Faroe Islands NGR; IOW 'NGR; IOW; IOW NGR	Jersey; Jersey; IOW; IOM; IOW	IOM; Faroe Islands; Jersey; Orkney Islands; Jersey				
1995	VI	Gibraltar	Backstroke; Breaststroke; Butterfly; Freestyle; Medley	Jersey NGR; Faroe Islands; Jersey; Guernsey; Jersey	Jersey; Faroe Islands; Guernsey; Iceland; Jersey	IOM; IOW; IOW; Jersey; Åland				
1997	VII	Jersey	Backstroke; Breaststroke; Butterfly; Freestyle; Medley	Jersey NGR; IOW NGR; Jersey; IOM NGR; Jersey	IOM; Faroe Islands; IOW; Guernsey; Jersey	Faroe Islands; IOW; Guernsey; Guernsey; Faroe Islands				
1999	VIII	Gotland	Backstroke; Breaststroke; Butterfly; Freestyle; Medley	IOM; IOW; Guernsey; Guernsey; IOW	Cayman Islands; Faroe Islands; IOW; Jersey; Faroe Islands	Jersey; Guernsey; Guernsey; IOM; Guernsey				
2001	IX	Isle of Man	Backstroke; Breaststroke; Butterfly; Freestyle; Medley	Cayman Islands NGR; Jersey; IOW (Anglesey) Ynys Môn; Jersey	IOM; Jersey; Guernsey; Jersey; IOM	Guernsey; Guernsey; IOM; Jersey; IOW				
2003	X	Guernsey	Backstroke; Breaststroke; Butterfly; Freestyle; Medley	Guernsey; Jersey; Cayman Islands; Bermuda; Guernsey	Cayman Islands; Jersey; Jersey; Guernsey; Cayman Islands	Cayman Islands; Bermuda; Guernsey; Jersey; Jersey				
2005	XI	Shetland	Backstroke; Breaststroke; Butterfly; Freestyle; Medley	Guernsey NGR; Jersey; Jersey NGR; Guernsey NGR; Guernsey NGR	Guernsey; IOM; Guernsey; Guernsey; Jersey	Jersey; Gibraltar; Guernsey; Jersey; Guernsey				
2007	XII	Rhodes	Backstroke; Breaststroke; Butterfly; Freestyle; Medley	Cayman Islands; Jersey; Jersey; Faroe Islands NGR; Guernsey	Guernsey; Jersey; Guernsey; Jersey; Jersey	Jersey; IOM; Guernsey; Guernsey; Jersey				
2009	XIII	Åland	Backstroke; Breaststroke; Butterfly; Freestyle; Medley	IOM NGR; Faroe Islands NGR; Guernsey; Faroe Islands NGR; Jersey NGR	Guernsey; Jersey; Guernsey; Guernsey; Faroe Islands	Jersey; Gotland; Faroe Islands; Guernsey; Guernsey				
2011	XIV	Isle of Wight	Backstroke; Breaststroke; Butterfly; Freestyle; Medley	Guernsey NGR; Faroe Islands; Guernsey; Faroe Islands; Guernsey NGR	Faroe Islands; Guernsey; Guernsey; Guernsey; Faroe Islands	Jersey; Menorca; Cayman Islands; Jersey; Cayman Islands				
2013	XV	Bermuda	Backstroke; Breaststroke; Butterfly; Freestyle; Medley	IOM; Jersey; Shetland; Jersey; Jersey	Jersey; IOM; Menorca; Guernsey; Shetland	Guernsey; Gibraltar; Guernsey; Shetland; Guernsey				
2015	XVI	Jersey	Backstroke; Breaststroke; Butterfly; Freestyle; Medley	Jersey; Faroe Islands NGR; Shetland; Faroe Islands; Cayman Islands	Cayman Islands; IOM; Guernsey; Jersey; Faroe Islands	Jersey; Jersey; Faroe Islands; Faroe Islands; Faroe Islands				
2017	XVII	Gotland	Backstroke; Breaststroke; Butterfly; Freestyle; Medley	Guernsey; IOM; Faroe Islands; Faroe Islands; Shetland	Faroe Islands; Faroe Islands; Shetland; IOM; Faroe Islands	Jersey; Faroe Islands; Guernsey; IOM; IOM				
2019	XVIII	Gibraltar	Backstroke; Breaststroke; Butterfly; Freestyle; Medley	Jersey NGR; Guernsey; Jersey; IOM NGR; Jersey NGR	Jersey; Jersey; Faroe Islands; Faroe Islands; Jersey	Guernsey; Jersey; Shetland; Faroe Islands; Faroe Islands				
2023	XIX	Guernsey	Backstroke; Breaststroke; Butterfly; Freestyle; Medley	Cayman Islands; Guernsey; Jersey; IOM; Jersey	Guernsey; Gotland; IOM; Faroe Islands; Jersey	Jersey; Faroe Islands; Faroe Islands; Jersey; Guernsey				

=== Men's 400m ===
Top Medalists

	Gold Medals		Total Medals	
	No:	Team	No:	Team
Men's 400m	11; 10	Jersey; Faroe Islands	32; 19; 16	Jersey; Faroe Islands; Guernsey

Results

Year	Games	Host	Event	Gold	Silver	Bronze				
Year	Games	Host	Event	1989	III	Faroe Islands	Freestyle	Faroe Islands	Iceland	Guernsey
1991	IV	Åland	Freestyle	IOM	Orkney Islands	Jersey				
1993	V	IOW	Freestyle; Medley	IOW; IOW	Orkney Islands; IOW	Jersey; Jersey				
1995	VI	Gibraltar	Freestyle; Medley	Jersey NGR; Jersey NGR	Guernsey; Jersey	Iceland; Guernsey				
1997	VII	Jersey	Freestyle; Medley	Jersey NGR; Jersey	Guernsey; Jersey	Guernsey; Faroe Islands				
1999	VIII	Gotland	Freestyle; Medley	Guernsey; IOW	IOM; Faroe Islands	Guernsey; Guernsey				
2001	IX	Isle of Man	Freestyle; Medley	Jersey; Jersey	Jersey; Jersey	Guernsey; Guernsey				
2003	X	Guernsey	Freestyle; Medley	Cayman Islands; Cayman Islands	Jersey; Cayman Islands	Guernsey; Jersey				
2005	XI	Shetland	Freestyle; Medley	Guernsey; Jersey NGR	Faroe Islands; Guernsey	Jersey; Gibraltar				
2007	XII	Rhodes	Freestyle; Medley	Faroe Islands NGR; Jersey	Guernsey; Jersey	Jersey; Gibraltar				
2009	XIII	Åland	Freestyle; Medley	Faroe Islands NGR; Jersey NGR	Jersey; Faroe Islands	Guernsey; Gibraltar				
2011	XIV	Isle of Wight	Freestyle; Medley	Faroe Islands; Faroe Islands NGR	Jersey; Jersey	Shetland; Cayman Islands				
2013	XV	Bermuda	Freestyle; Medley	Cayman Islands; Shetland	Shetland; Gibraltar	Jersey; Jersey				
2015	XVI	Jersey	Freestyle; Medley	Faroe Islands; Faroe Islands NGR	Faroe Islands; Faroe Islands	Shetland; Jersey				
2017	XVII	Gotland	Freestyle; Medley	Faroe Islands; Faroe Islands	Shetland; Shetland	Faroe Islands; Cayman Islands				
2019	XVIII	Gibraltar	Freestyle; Medley	IOM; Faroe Islands NGR	Faroe Islands; Jersey	Shetland; Guernsey				
2023	XIX	Guernsey	Freestyle; Medley	Jersey; Jersey	Jersey; Jersey	Faroe Islands; Cayman Islands				

=== Men's 1500m ===
Top Medalists

	Gold Medals		Total Medals	
	No:	Team	No:	Team
Men's 1500m	7; 4	Faroe Islands; Jersey	14; 13	Jersey; Faroe Islands

Results

Year	Games	Host	Event	Gold	Silver	Bronze				
Year	Games	Host	Event	1997	VII	Jersey	Freestyle	Jersey NGR	Guernsey	Faroe Islands
1999	VIII	Gotland	Freestyle	Jersey	Jersey	Faroe Islands				
2001	IX	Isle of Man	Freestyle	Jersey NGR	Jersey	Guernsey				
2003	X	Guernsey	Freestyle	Cayman Islands	Jersey	Guernsey				
2005	XI	Shetland	Freestyle	Guernsey	Faroe Islands	Jersey				
2007	XII	Rhodes	Freestyle	Faroe Islands NGR	Guernsey	Jersey				
2009	XIII	Åland Islands	Freestyle	Faroe Islands	Jersey	Guernsey				
2011	XIV	Isle of Wight	Freestyle	Faroe Islands NGR	Jersey	Guernsey				
2013	XV	Bermuda	Freestyle	Jersey	Cayman Islands	Guernsey				
2015	XVI	Jersey	Freestyle	Faroe Islands NGR	Faroe Islands	Jersey				
2017	XVII	Gotland	Freestyle	Faroe Islands	Faroe Islands	Cayman Islands				
2019	XVIII	Gibraltar	Freestyle	Faroe Islands	Jersey	Jersey				
2023	XIX	Guernsey	Freestyle	Faroe Islands	Faroe Islands	Cayman Islands				

=== Men's Relay Team ===
Top Medalists

	Gold Medals		Total Medals	
	No:	Team	No:	Team
Men's Relay Team	19; 17; 14	Jersey; Guernsey; IOM	53; 44; 41	Jersey; Guernsey; Faroe Islands

Results

Year	Games	Host	Event	Gold	Silver	Bronze				
Year	Games	Host	Event	1985	I	Isle of Man	4x33 Freestyle; 4x33 Medley	IOW; IOW	IOM; IOM	IOM; Guernsey
1987	II	Guernsey	4x50 Freestyle; 4x50 Medley	IOM; IOM	Faroe Islands; Gibraltar	IOW; Jersey				
1989	III	Faroe Islands	4x50 Freestyle; 4x50 Medley	Faroe Islands; Iceland	Iceland; IOM	Guernsey; Orkney Islands				
1991	IV	Åland	4x50 Freestyle; 4x50 Medley; 4x100 Freestyle	Orkney Islands; Faroe Islands; IOM	Faroe Islands; Orkney Islands; Orkney Islands	IOM; Jersey; IOW				
1993	V	IOW	4x50 Freestyle; 4x50 Medley; 4x100 Freestyle; 4x100 Medley	IOM; Faroe Islands; Jersey; IOW	Jersey; IOW; IOW; Jersey	Faroe Islands; Jersey; IOM; Faroe Islands				
1995	VI	Gibraltar	4x50 Freestyle; 4x50 Medley; 4x100 Freestyle; 4x100 Medley	Orkney Islands NGR; Faroe Islands NGR; Guernsey NGR; Jersey NGR	Guernsey; Orkney Islands; Orkney Islands; Faroe Islands	Jersey; Jersey; Jersey; IOW				
1997	VII	Jersey	4x50 Freestyle; 4x50 Medley; 4x100 Freestyle; 4x100 Medley	Jersey NGR; Jersey NGR; Jersey NGR; Jersey NGR	Faroe Islands; IOW; Guernsey; IOW	Guernsey; IOM; Faroe Islands; Guernsey				
1999	VIII	Gotland	4x50 Freestyle; 4x50 Medley; 4x100 Freestyle; 4x100 Medley	Guernsey NGR; Faroe Islands; Guernsey; IOM	Jersey; IOM; Faroe Islands; IOW	IOM; IOW; Jersey; Faroe Islands				
2001	IX	Isle of Man	4x50 Freestyle; 4x50 Medley; 4x100 Freestyle; 4x100 Medley	IOM NGR; IOM NGR; Jersey; IOM	Faroe Islands; Faroe Islands; IOM; Jersey	Jersey; Jersey; Faroe Islands; IOW				
2003	X	Guernsey	4x50 Freestyle; 4x50 Medley; 4x100 Freestyle; 4x100 Medley	Bermuda; Bermuda; Jersey; Jersey	Jersey; Faroe Islands; Bermuda; Bermuda	Faroe Islands; Jersey; Guernsey; IOM				
2005	XI	Shetland	4x50 Freestyle; 4x50 Medley; 4x100 Freestyle; 4x100 Medley	Jersey NGR; Jersey NGR; Jersey NGR; Jersey	Guernsey; Guernsey; Guernsey; Guernsey	Faroe Islands; IOM; Faroe Islands; IOM				
2007	XII	Rhodes	4x50 Freestyle; 4x50 Medley; 4x100 Freestyle; 4x100 Medley	Faroe Islands; Faroe Islands; Guernsey; Jersey NGR	Guernsey; Jersey; Faroe Islands; Guernsey	Jersey; Guernsey; Jersey; Faroe Islands				
2009	XIII	Åland	4x50 Freestyle; 4x50 Medley; 4x100 Freestyle; 4x100 Medley	Guernsey NGR; Faroe Islands NGR; Guernsey NGR; Guernsey NGR	Jersey; Jersey; Faroe Islands; Faroe Islands	IOM; IOM; Jersey; IOM				
2011	XIV	Isle of Wight	4x50 Freestyle; 4x50 Medley; 4x100 Freestyle; 4x100 Medley	Faroe Islands; Guernsey NGR; Faroe Islands NGR; Guernsey NGR	Guernsey; Faroe Islands; Guernsey; Faroe Islands	Jersey; Jersey; Jersey; IOW				
2013	XV	Bermuda	4x50 Freestyle; 4x50 Medley; 4x100 Freestyle; 4x100 Medley	Guernsey NGR; Guernsey NGR; Cayman Islands; Guernsey	Cayman Islands; Jersey; Guernsey; Cayman Islands	Jersey; Cayman Islands; Jersey; Jersey				
2015	XVI	Jersey	4x50 Freestyle; 4x50 Medley; 4x100 Freestyle; 4x100 Medley	Guernsey; Jersey NGR; Guernsey; Jersey NGR	Jersey; Guernsey; Jersey; Guernsey	Cayman Islands; Faroe Islands; Faroe Islands; Faroe Islands				
2017	XVII	Gotland	4x50 Freestyle; 4x50 Medley; 4x100 Freestyle; 4x100 Medley	Guernsey; Guernsey; Guernsey; IOM	IOM; IOM; IOM; Guernsey	Faroe Islands; Faroe Islands; Faroe Islands; Faroe Islands				
2019	XVIII	Gibraltar	4x50 Freestyle; 4x50 Medley; 4x100 Freestyle; 4x100 Medley	IOM; IOM; IOM; Jersey	Guernsey; Guernsey; Faroe Islands; IOM	Jersey; Jersey; Guernsey; Guernsey				
2023	XIX	Guernsey	4x50 Freestyle; 4x50 Medley; 4x100 Freestyle; 4x100 Medley	Jersey; IOM; IOM; Jersey	IOM; Jersey; Jersey; Guernsey	Guernsey; Guernsey; Faroe Islands; IOM				

== Mixed Relay Team Results ==
Top Medalists

	Gold Medals		Total Medals	
	No:	Team	No:	Team
Mixed Relay	5; 4	Jersey; Guernsey	14; 9	Guernsey; Jersey

Results

Year	Games	Host	Event	Gold	Silver	Bronze				
Year	Games	Host	Event	1991	IV	Åland	8x50 Freestyle	Iceland	Faroe Islands	Jersey
1995	VI	Gibraltar	8x50 Freestyle	Jersey NGR	Guernsey	IOW				
1997	VII	Jersey	8x50 Freestyle	Jersey NGR	Guernsey	Faroe Islands				
1999	VIII	Gotland	8x50 Freestyle	Guernsey	Jersey	Gotland				
2001	IX	Isle of Man	8x50 Freestyle	Jersey	Guernsey	IOW				
2003	X	Guernsey	8x50 Freestyle	Jersey	Guernsey	IOM				
2005	XI	Shetland	8x50 Freestyle	Guernsey NGR	Faroe Islands	IOM				
2007	XII	Rhodes	8x50 Freestyle	Faroe Islands NGR	Guernsey	IOM				
2009	XIII	Åland	8x50 Freestyle	Faroe Islands NGR	Jersey	Guernsey				
2011	XIV	Isle of Wight	8x50 Freestyle	Faroe Islands NGR	Jersey	Guernsey				
2013	XV	Bermuda	8x50 Freestyle	Guernsey	Bermuda	IOM				
2015	XVI	Jersey	8x50 Freestyle	IOM	Faroe Islands	Guernsey				
2017	XVII	Gotland	4x50 Freestyle	Guernsey NGR	IOM	Cayman Islands				
2019	XVIII	Gibraltar	4x50 Freestyle	IOM NGR	Cayman Islands	Guernsey				
2023	XIX	Guernsey	4x50 Freestyle	Jersey	Guernsey	Cayman Islands				

== Women's Results ==
=== Women's 50m ===
Top Medalists

	Gold Medals		Total Medals	
	No:	Team	No:	Team
Women's 50m	19; 11; 9	Jersey; Guernsey; Faroe Islands	48; 37; 25	Jersey; Guernsey; Faroe Islands

Results

Year	Games	Host	Event	Gold	Silver	Bronze				
Year	Games	Host	Event	1985	I	Isle of Man	66m Freestyle	Guernsey	Jersey	Jersey
1987	II	Guernsey	Freestyle	Jersey	IOM	Jersey				
1989	III	Faroe Islands	Backstroke; Breaststroke; Butterfly; Freestyle	Guernsey; IOM; Iceland; Jersey NGR	Shetland; Jersey; Shetland; Shetland	Iceland; Jersey; IOM; Guernsey				
1991	IV	Åland	Freestyle	IOM	Guernsey	Iceland				
1993	V	IOW	Backstroke; Breaststroke; Butterfly; Freestyle	Jersey; Guernsey; IOW; Jersey	Guernsey; Guernsey; Jersey; IOW	Jersey; Jersey; Jersey; Iceland				
1995	VI	Gibraltar	Backstroke; Breaststroke; Butterfly; Freestyle	Jersey NGR; Guernsey NGR; Jersey NGR; Jersey	Guernsey; Gotland; Faroe Islands; IOM	Guernsey; Iceland; Gotland; Guernsey				
1997	VII	Jersey	Backstroke; Breaststroke; Butterfly; Freestyle	Jersey; Guernsey NGR; Jersey NGR; Jersey NGR	Jersey; IOM; Jersey; IOM	Guernsey; IOW; Gotland; Guernsey				
1999	VIII	Gotland	Backstroke; Breaststroke; Butterfly; Freestyle	Cayman Islands; Guernsey NGR; Jersey; Guernsey NGR	IOM; Jersey; Gibraltar; IOM	Guernsey; IOW; Jersey; Guernsey				
2001	IX	Isle of Man	Backstroke; Breaststroke; Butterfly; Freestyle	Cayman Islands; Jersey; IOW; Jersey NGR	Jersey; Guernsey; Jersey; Guernsey	IOW; Gotland; Jersey (Anglesey) Ynys Môn				
2003	X	Guernsey	Backstroke; Breaststroke; Butterfly; Freestyle	Bermuda; Jersey; Jersey; Bermuda	Jersey; Jersey; Bermuda; Jersey	Guernsey; Guernsey (Anglesey) Ynys Môn; Bermuda				
2005	XI	Shetland	Backstroke; Breaststroke; Butterfly; Freestyle	Jersey; Guernsey (Anglesey) Ynys Môn; Guernsey	Faroe Islands; Jersey; Åland (Anglesey) Ynys Môn	Gibraltar; IOW; IOW; Faroe Islands				
2007	XII	Rhodes	Backstroke; Breaststroke; Butterfly; Freestyle	Faroe Islands NGR; Shetland; Bermuda; Faroe Islands	Gotland; Bermuda; Cayman Islands; Faroe Islands	Jersey; Jersey; Faroe Islands; Bermuda				
2009	XIII	Åland	Backstroke; Breaststroke; Butterfly; Freestyle	Faroe Islands; Faroe Islands; Faroe Islands Jersey; Faroe Islands	Faroe Islands; Åland Jersey	Bermuda; Shetland; Faroe Islands; Jersey				
2011	XIV	Isle of Wight	Backstroke; Breaststroke; Butterfly; Freestyle	Faroe Islands NGR; Shetland NGR; Guernsey NGR; Shetland	Faroe Islands; IOM; Jersey; Jersey	Jersey; IOM; Faroe Islands; Faroe Islands				
2013	XV	Bermuda	Backstroke; Breaststroke; Butterfly; Freestyle	IOM; Shetland NGR; IOM NGR; Bermuda NGR	Cayman Islands; IOM; Bermuda; Shetland	Bermuda; Bermuda; Bermuda; Guernsey				
2015	XVI	Jersey	Backstroke; Breaststroke; Butterfly; Freestyle	Western Isles NGR; Shetland; IOM; IOM	Guernsey; Western Isles; Faroe Islands; Shetland	IOW; IOM; Jersey; IOM				
2017	XVII	Gotland	Backstroke; Breaststroke; Butterfly; Freestyle	Western Isles NGR; Western Isles; IOM; Western Isles NGR	Faroe Islands; IOM; Faroe Islands; Cayman Islands	Guernsey; IOM; Faroe Islands; Åland				
2019	XVIII	Gibraltar	Backstroke; Breaststroke; Butterfly; Freestyle	Jersey; Faroe Islands; Jersey; IOM	Guernsey; Guernsey; IOM; Guernsey	Cayman Islands; Guernsey; Faroe Islands; Cayman Islands				
2023	XIX	Guernsey	Backstroke; Breaststroke; Butterfly; Freestyle	Faroe Islands NGR; IOM; Guernsey; Cayman Islands	Guernsey; Guernsey; Guernsey; Guernsey	Jersey; Shetland; Åland; Faroe Islands				

=== Women's 100m ===
Top Medalists

	Gold Medals		Total Medals	
	No:	Team	No:	Team
Women's 100m	19; 17; 12	Jersey; Faroe Islands; Guernsey	56; 54; 38	Guernsey; Jersey; IOM

Results

Year	Games	Host	Event	Gold	Silver	Bronze				
Year	Games	Host	Event	1985	I	Isle of Man	Backstroke; Breaststroke; Butterfly; Freestyle	Guernsey; Jersey; Guernsey; Guernsey NGR	IOM; IOW; Jersey; Jersey	Shetland; IOM; IOM; IOM
1987	II	Guernsey	Backstroke; Breaststroke; Butterfly; Freestyle	Shetland; IOM; Jersey; Jersey	Guernsey; IOM; Guernsey; IOM	IOW; Jersey; Guernsey; IOM				
1989	III	Faroe Islands	Backstroke; Breaststroke; Butterfly; Freestyle	Guernsey; IOM; Iceland; Jersey	Iceland; Jersey; Guernsey; IOM	Faroe Islands; Guernsey; IOM; Guernsey				
1991	IV	Åland	Backstroke; Breaststroke; Butterfly; Freestyle	Guernsey; Guernsey NGR; Jersey; Iceland	Jersey; IOM; Guernsey; IOM	Faroe Islands; Iceland; Jersey; Guernsey				
1993	V	IOW	Backstroke; Breaststroke; Butterfly; Freestyle	Jersey; Guernsey; IOW NGR; Jersey	Guernsey; IOM; Jersey; Iceland	Jersey; Guernsey; Guernsey; Guernsey				
1995	VI	Gibraltar	Backstroke; Breaststroke; Butterfly; Freestyle	Jersey NGR; Guernsey; Faroe Islands; Jersey	Jersey; Gotland; Guernsey; Guernsey	Guernsey; Iceland; Guernsey; IOM				
1997	VII	Jersey	Backstroke; Breaststroke; Butterfly; Freestyle	Jersey NGR; Guernsey NGR; Jersey; IOM	Guernsey; IOM; Jersey; Jersey	Guernsey; Jersey; Guernsey (Anglesey) Ynys Môn				
1999	VIII	Gotland	Backstroke; Breaststroke; Butterfly; Freestyle	Cayman Islands NGR; Guernsey NGR; Guernsey; Guernsey	Guernsey; Jersey; Gibraltar; Jersey	Guernsey; Guernsey; Jersey; IOM				
2001	IX	Isle of Man	Backstroke; Breaststroke; Butterfly; Freestyle	Cayman Islands NGR; Jersey; Jersey; Jersey NGR	IOW; Guernsey; IOW; IOW	Guernsey; Gotland; Jersey; Guernsey				
2003	X	Guernsey	Backstroke; Breaststroke; Butterfly; Freestyle	Bermuda; Guernsey; Cayman Islands; Guernsey	Jersey; Bermuda; Guernsey; Jersey	Guernsey; Jersey; IOW; Bermuda				
2005	XI	Shetland	Backstroke; Breaststroke; Butterfly; Freestyle; Medley	Gotland; Guernsey; Cayman Islands NGR; Gibraltar; Gotland NGR	IOM; Jersey; Åland; Guernsey; Guernsey	Faroe Islands; Åland (Anglesey) Ynys Môn; IOM; Cayman Islands				
2007	XII	Rhodes	Backstroke; Breaststroke; Butterfly; Freestyle; Medley	Faroe Islands NGR; Jersey; Cayman Islands; Faroe Islands; Gotland NGR	Gotland; Shetland; Guernsey; IOM; Jersey	IOM; Jersey; Bermuda; Faroe Islands; Bermuda				
2009	XIII	Åland	Backstroke; Breaststroke; Butterfly; Freestyle; Medley	IOM Faroe Islands; Faroe Islands; Guernsey NGR; Faroe Islands; Jersey	Jersey; Faroe Islands; IOM; Faroe Islands	Faroe Islands; Faroe Islands; Faroe Islands; Shetland; IOW				
2011	XIV	Isle of Wight	Backstroke; Breaststroke; Butterfly; Freestyle; Medley	Faroe Islands NGR; Shetland NGR; Guernsey NGR; Jersey NGR; Shetland NGR	Faroe Islands; Jersey; Cayman Islands; Shetland; Cayman Islands	Jersey; IOM; Jersey; Guernsey; Faroe Islands				
2013	XV	Bermuda	Backstroke; Breaststroke; Butterfly; Freestyle; Medley	Cayman Islands; Shetland NGR; Gotland NGR; Jersey; Gotland NGR	Bermuda; IOM; IOM; Bermuda; Shetland	Bermuda; Gotland; Cayman Islands; Guernsey; Bermuda				
2015	XVI	Jersey	Backstroke; Breaststroke; Butterfly; Freestyle; Medley	Guernsey; Shetland NGR; IOM NGR; IOM; Shetland	IOW; Western Isles; Jersey; Guernsey; Western Isles	Cayman Islands; IOM; Faroe Islands; Faroe Islands; IOM				
2017	XVII	Gotland	Backstroke; Breaststroke; Butterfly; Freestyle; Medley	Faroe Islands NGR; IOM; Faroe Islands; Jersey; Faroe Islands	Jersey; IOM (Anglesey) Ynys Môn; Åland Islands; Jersey	Western Isles; Shetland; Guernsey; Guernsey; IOW				
2019	XVIII	Gibraltar	Backstroke; Breaststroke; Butterfly; Freestyle; Medley	Faroe Islands NGR; Western Isles NGR; IOM; Åland NGR; Western Isles	Jersey; IOM; Guernsey; Faroe Islands; IOW	IOM; Shetland; Åland; Cayman Islands; Jersey				
2023	XIX	Guernsey	Backstroke; Breaststroke; Butterfly; Freestyle; Medley	Faroe Islands NGR; IOM; Guernsey; Jersey; IOW	Jersey; Shetland; Jersey; Cayman Islands; IOM	Guernsey; Gibraltar; Jersey; Faroe Islands; Guernsey				

=== Women's 200m ===
Top Medalists

	Gold Medals		Total Medals	
	No:	Team	No:	Team
Women's 200m	24; 19; 11	Jersey; Guernsey; IOM Faroe Islands	72; 71; 31	Guernsey; Jersey; IOM

Results

Year	Games	Host	Event	Gold	Silver	Bronze				
Year	Games	Host	Event	1985	I	Isle of Man	Freestyle; Medley	Guernsey NGR; Guernsey	Jersey; Jersey	Guernsey; Jersey
1987	II	Guernsey	Freestyle; Medley	IOM; IOM	Jersey; Guernsey	Guernsey; Jersey				
1989	III	Faroe Islands	Backstroke; Breaststroke; Butterfly; Freestyle; Medley	Faroe Islands; IOM; Iceland; Guernsey; Iceland	Guernsey; Jersey; Guernsey; IOM; IOM	Orkney Islands; IOM; Guernsey; Iceland; Jersey				
1991	IV	Åland	Backstroke; Breaststroke; Butterfly; Freestyle; Medley	Faroe Islands; Guernsey; Jersey; Iceland; Guernsey	Jersey; Guernsey; Guernsey; Guernsey; Jersey	Guernsey; Iceland; Jersey; IOM; Guernsey				
1993	V	IOW	Backstroke; Breaststroke; Butterfly; Freestyle; Medley	Jersey; IOM; Jersey NGR; Guernsey; Guernsey	Guernsey; Guernsey; Guernsey; Jersey; Jersey	Jersey; Guernsey; IOW; Iceland; Faroe Islands				
1995	VI	Gibraltar	Backstroke; Breaststroke; Butterfly; Freestyle; Medley	Jersey NGR; Guernsey NGR; Guernsey; Jersey; Jersey NGR	Jersey; Gotland; Jersey; Guernsey; Guernsey	Guernsey; Jersey; Guernsey; Guernsey; Jersey				
1997	VII	Jersey	Backstroke; Breaststroke; Butterfly; Freestyle; Medley	Jersey NGR; Guernsey; Guernsey; Jersey; Jersey	Guernsey; Jersey; Guernsey (Anglesey) Ynys Môn; Guernsey	Guernsey; IOW; Jersey; Guernsey; Jersey				
1999	VIII	Gotland	Backstroke; Breaststroke; Butterfly; Freestyle; Medley	Cayman Islands; Guernsey NGR; Gibraltar; Jersey; Jersey NGR	IOW; Jersey; Guernsey; IOW; Guernsey	Guernsey Guernsey; IOW; Cayman Islands; Gotland; Jersey				
2001	IX	Isle of Man	Backstroke; Breaststroke; Butterfly; Freestyle; Medley	Jersey NGR; Jersey NGR; Cayman Islands NGR; Jersey NGR; Jersey NGR	Cayman Islands; Guernsey; Guernsey; IOW; Guernsey	Guernsey; Jersey; Jersey; Guernsey; Gotland				
2003	X	Guernsey	Backstroke; Breaststroke; Butterfly; Freestyle; Medley	Jersey; Guernsey; Cayman Islands; Guernsey; Jersey	Bermuda; Jersey; Guernsey; Cayman Islands; Guernsey	Jersey; Guernsey; Cayman Islands; Gibraltar; Cayman Islands				
2005	XI	Shetland	Backstroke; Breaststroke; Butterfly; Freestyle; Medley	Gotland; Guernsey; Cayman Islands; Gibraltar; Gotland	IOM; Jersey; Jersey; Cayman Islands; Guernsey	Jersey; Guernsey; IOM; IOM; IOM				
2007	XII	Rhodes	Backstroke; Breaststroke; Butterfly; Freestyle; Medley	Faroe Islands; Jersey; Gotland; Gotland; Gotland	IOM; Faroe Islands; Guernsey; Faroe Islands; Jersey	Gotland; Guernsey; Cayman Islands; IOM; IOM				
2009	XIII	Åland	Backstroke; Breaststroke; Butterfly; Freestyle; Medley	IOM; Faroe Islands; IOM; IOM; Jersey	Jersey; Jersey; Jersey; Jersey; IOM	Faroe Islands; Faroe Islands; Guernsey; Faroe Islands; Guernsey				
2011	XIV	Isle of Wight	Backstroke; Breaststroke; Butterfly; Freestyle; Medley	IOM; Faroe Islands; Guernsey NGR; Guernsey NGR; Shetland	Guernsey; IOM; IOM; Shetland; Guernsey	Jersey; Guernsey; Cayman Islands; Jersey; IOM				
2013	XV	Bermuda	Backstroke; Breaststroke; Butterfly; Freestyle; Medley	Bermuda; IOM NGR; Cayman Islands; Jersey NGR; Gotland NGR	Cayman Islands; Jersey; IOM; Guernsey; Shetland	Jersey; Bermuda; Jersey; Jersey; Cayman Islands				
2015	XVI	Jersey	Backstroke; Breaststroke; Butterfly; Freestyle; Medley	Guernsey; Western Isles NGR; IOM NGR; Faroe Islands; IOM	Cayman Islands; IOM; Cayman Islands; Jersey; Shetland	Faroe Islands; Faroe Islands; Faroe Islands; Guernsey; Faroe Islands				
2017	XVII	Gotland	Backstroke; Breaststroke; Butterfly; Freestyle; Medley	Faroe Islands NGR; Western Isles; Faroe Islands; Jersey; Western Isles	Jersey; IOM; Guernsey; Cayman Islands; Faroe Islands	Cayman Islands; IOM (Anglesey) Ynys Môn; Faroe Islands; Guernsey				
2019	XVIII	Gibraltar	Backstroke; Breaststroke; Butterfly; Freestyle; Medley	Faroe Islands; Western Isles (Anglesey) Ynys Môn; Faroe Islands; Jersey	Jersey; IOM; Jersey; Jersey; Western Isles	Guernsey; Shetland; Shetland; Åland; IOW				
2023	XIX	Guernsey	Backstroke; Breaststroke; Butterfly; Freestyle; Medley	Faroe Islands; Gibraltar; Guernsey; Jersey; Jersey	Jersey; Faroe Islands; Faroe Islands; Faroe Islands; IOW	Guernsey; IOW; Jersey; Cayman Islands; Guernsey				

=== Women's 400m ===
Top Medalists

	Gold Medals		Total Medals	
	No:	Team	No:	Team
Women's 400m	8; 7	Jersey; Faroe Islands Guernsey	25; 22	Guernsey; Jersey

Results

Year	Games	Host	Event	Gold	Silver	Bronze				
Year	Games	Host	Event	1989	III	Faroe Islands	Freestyle	Guernsey	Iceland	IOM
1991	IV	Åland	Freestyle	Guernsey	Guernsey	IOM				
1993	V	IOW	Freestyle; Medley	Guernsey; Guernsey	IOW; Jersey	Iceland; Guernsey				
1995	VI	Gibraltar	Freestyle; Medley	Jersey NGR; Jersey NGR	Guernsey; Guernsey	Guernsey; Jersey				
1997	VII	Jersey	Freestyle; Medley	Jersey; Jersey	Guernsey; Jersey	(Anglesey) Ynys Môn; Guernsey				
1999	VIII	Gotland	Freestyle; Medley	Cayman Islands; Jersey NGR	Guernsey; Guernsey	Gotland; Cayman Islands				
2001	IX	Isle of Man	Freestyle; Medley	IOW NGR; Jersey NGR	Cayman Islands; Guernsey	Jersey; Cayman Islands				
2003	X	Guernsey	Freestyle; Medley	Cayman Islands NGR; Guernsey	Cayman Islands; Cayman Islands	Guernsey; Jersey				
2005	XI	Shetland	Freestyle; Medley	Cayman Islands; Gotland	IOM; Guernsey	Cayman Islands; IOM				
2007	XII	Rhodes	Freestyle; Medley	Gotland NGR; Gotland	Faroe Islands; IOM	IOM; Jersey				
2009	XIII	Åland	Freestyle; Medley	Faroe Islands NGR; Jersey NGR	Jersey; IOM	Guernsey; Guernsey				
2011	XIV	Isle of Wight	Freestyle; Medley	Guernsey NGR; IOM NGR	Jersey; Guernsey	Shetland; Jersey				
2013	XV	Bermuda	Freestyle; Medley	Jersey; Cayman Islands	IOM; Jersey	Guernsey; Bermuda				
2015	XVI	Jersey	Freestyle; Medley	Faroe Islands; Faroe Islands	Jersey; Cayman Islands	Faroe Islands; Faroe Islands				
2017	XVII	Gotland	Freestyle; Medley	Faroe Islands; Faroe Islands	Jersey; Guernsey	IOW; IOW				
2019	XVIII	Gibraltar	Freestyle; Medley	Faroe Islands; Faroe Islands	Jersey; IOW	Western Isles; Faroe Islands				
2023	XIX	Guernsey	Freestyle; Medley	Cayman Islands NGR; Guernsey	Faroe Islands; Jersey	Guernsey; Faroe Islands				

=== Women's 800m ===
Top Medalists

	Gold Medals		Total Medals	
	No:	Team	No:	Team
Women's 800m	5; 4	Faroe Islands; Cayman Islands	10; 9	Cayman Islands; Faroe Islands

Results

Year	Games	Host	Event	Gold	Silver	Bronze				
Year	Games	Host	Event	1997	VII	Jersey	Freestyle	Guernsey NGR	Jersey	Jersey
1999	VIII	Gotland	Freestyle	Cayman Islands NGR	Guernsey	Gotland				
2001	IX	Isle of Man	Freestyle	Jersey NGR	Cayman Islands	Cayman Islands				
2003	X	Guernsey	Freestyle	Cayman Islands NGR	Cayman Islands	Jersey				
2005	XI	Shetland	Freestyle	Cayman Islands	Cayman Islands	Faroe Islands				
2007	XII	Rhodes	Freestyle	Faroe Islands	Cayman Islands	Faroe Islands				
2009	XIII	Åland	Freestyle	Faroe Islands	Jersey	Jersey				
2011	XIV	Isle of Wight	Freestyle	Guernsey NGR	IOM	Shetland				
2013	XV	Bermuda	Freestyle	Jersey	Jersey	Guernsey				
2015	XVI	Jersey	Freestyle	Faroe Islands	Faroe Islands	Guernsey				
2017	XVII	Gotland	Freestyle	Faroe Islands	IOW	Guernsey				
2019	XVIII	Gibraltar	Freestyle	Faroe Islands	Cayman Islands	Guernsey				
2023	XIX	Guernsey	Freestyle	Cayman Islands NGR	Faroe Islands	Jersey				

=== Women's Relay Team ===
Top Medalists

	Gold Medals		Total Medals	
	No:	Team	No:	Team
Women's Relay Team	24; 18; 13	Jersey; Guernsey; Faroe Islands	56; 54; 31	Guernsey; Jersey; Faroe Islands

Results

Year	Games	Host	Event	Gold	Silver	Bronze				
Year	Games	Host	Event	1985	I	Isle of Man	4x33 Freestyle; 4x33 Medley	Guernsey; Guernsey	Jersey; Jersey	IOM; IOM
1987	II	Guernsey	4x50 Freestyle; 4x50 Medley	IOM; Jersey	Jersey; IOM	IOW; IOW				
1989	III	Faroe Islands	4x50 Freestyle; 4x50 Medley	IOM; Jersey	Jersey; Guernsey	Iceland; IOM				
1991	IV	Åland	4x50 Freestyle; 4x50 Medley; 4x100 Freestyle	Iceland; Guernsey; Guernsey	Guernsey; Iceland; Iceland	Faroe Islands; Jersey; Faroe Islands				
1993	V	IOW	4x50 Freestyle; 4x50 Medley; 4x100 Freestyle; 4x100 Medley	Jersey; Jersey; Jersey; Jersey NGR	IOM; Guernsey; Guernsey; Guernsey	Guernsey; IOM; IOW; IOM				
1995	VI	Gibraltar	4x50 Freestyle; 4x50 Medley; 4x100 Freestyle; 4x100 Medley	Jersey NGR; Guernsey NGR; Guernsey NGR; Guernsey	Guernsey; Gotland; Jersey; Jersey	Gotland; IOM; IOW; Iceland				
1997	VII	Jersey	4x50 Freestyle; 4x50 Medley; 4x100 Freestyle; 4x100 Medley	Jersey NGR; Guernsey NGR; Jersey NGR; Guernsey NGR	Gotland; Jersey; Guernsey; Jersey	Guernsey; Faroe Islands; Gotland; Faroe Islands				
1999	VIII	Gotland	4x50 Freestyle; 4x50 Medley; 4x100 Freestyle; 4x100 Medley	Jersey; Guernsey; Guernsey NGR; Guernsey NGR	Guernsey; IOW; Jersey; Jersey	Gotland; Jersey; Gotland; IOW				
2001	IX	Isle of Man	4x50 Freestyle; 4x50 Medley; 4x100 Freestyle; 4x100 Medley	Jersey NGR; Jersey NGR; Jersey NGR; Jersey NGR	Guernsey; Guernsey; Guernsey; Guernsey	IOW; IOW; IOW; IOW				
2003	X	Guernsey	4x50 Freestyle; 4x50 Medley; 4x100 Freestyle; 4x100 Medley	Jersey; Jersey; Guernsey NGR; Jersey	Guernsey; Guernsey; Jersey; Guernsey	IOW; IOW; IOW; IOW				
2005	XI	Shetland	4x50 Freestyle; 4x50 Medley; 4x100 Freestyle; 4x100 Medley	Faroe Islands; IOW; Guernsey; Jersey	IOW; Jersey; Jersey; Guernsey	Guernsey; Faroe Islands; Cayman Islands; Faroe Islands				
2007	XII	Rhodes	4x50 Freestyle; 4x50 Medley; 4x100 Freestyle; 4x100 Medley	Faroe Islands NGR; Faroe Islands NGR; Faroe Islands NGR; Faroe Islands NGR	Bermuda; Bermuda; Bermuda; Guernsey	IOM; Jersey; Jersey; Jersey				
2009	XIII	Åland	4x50 Freestyle; 4x50 Medley; 4x100 Freestyle; 4x100 Medley	Faroe Islands NGR; Faroe Islands NGR; Jersey NGR; Faroe Islands NGR	Jersey; Jersey; IOM; Jersey	Bermuda; Guernsey; Bermuda; Guernsey				
2011	XIV	Isle of Wight	4x50 Freestyle; 4x50 Medley; 4x100 Freestyle; 4x100 Medley	Faroe Islands NGR; Faroe Islands; Jersey NGR; Jersey NGR	Jersey; Jersey; Faroe Islands; Faroe Islands	Guernsey; Guernsey; Guernsey; Guernsey				
2013	XV	Bermuda	4x50 Freestyle; 4x50 Medley; 4x100 Freestyle; 4x100 Medley	Bermuda NGR; Bermuda NGR; Jersey NGR; Bermuda	Jersey; IOM; Bermuda; Jersey	Guernsey; Jersey; Guernsey; IOM				
2015	XVI	Jersey	4x50 Freestyle; 4x50 Medley; 4x100 Freestyle; 4x100 Medley	IOM; Faroe Islands NGR; Jersey; IOM NGR	Faroe Islands; IOM; IOM; Faroe Islands	Guernsey; Jersey; Faroe Islands; Guernsey				
2017	XVII	Gotland	4x50 Freestyle; 4x50 Medley; 4x100 Freestyle; 4x100 Medley	Guernsey NGR; IOM NGR; Faroe Islands; Faroe Islands	IOM; Faroe Islands; IOM; IOM	Faroe Islands; Guernsey; Guernsey; Guernsey				
2019	XVIII	Gibraltar	4x50 Freestyle; 4x50 Medley; 4x100 Freestyle; 4x100 Medley	IOM; IOM NGR; Cayman Islands; IOM	Guernsey; Guernsey; Guernsey; Guernsey	Faroe Islands; Faroe Islands; Faroe Islands; IOW				
2023	XIX	Guernsey	4x50 Freestyle; 4x50 Medley; 4x100 Freestyle; 4x100 Medley	Guernsey NGR; Guernsey NGR; Jersey; Guernsey NGR	Cayman Islands; Faroe Islands; Cayman Islands; Faroe Islands	Jersey; Jersey; Guernsey; Jersey				
