= Lee Merrien =

British runner

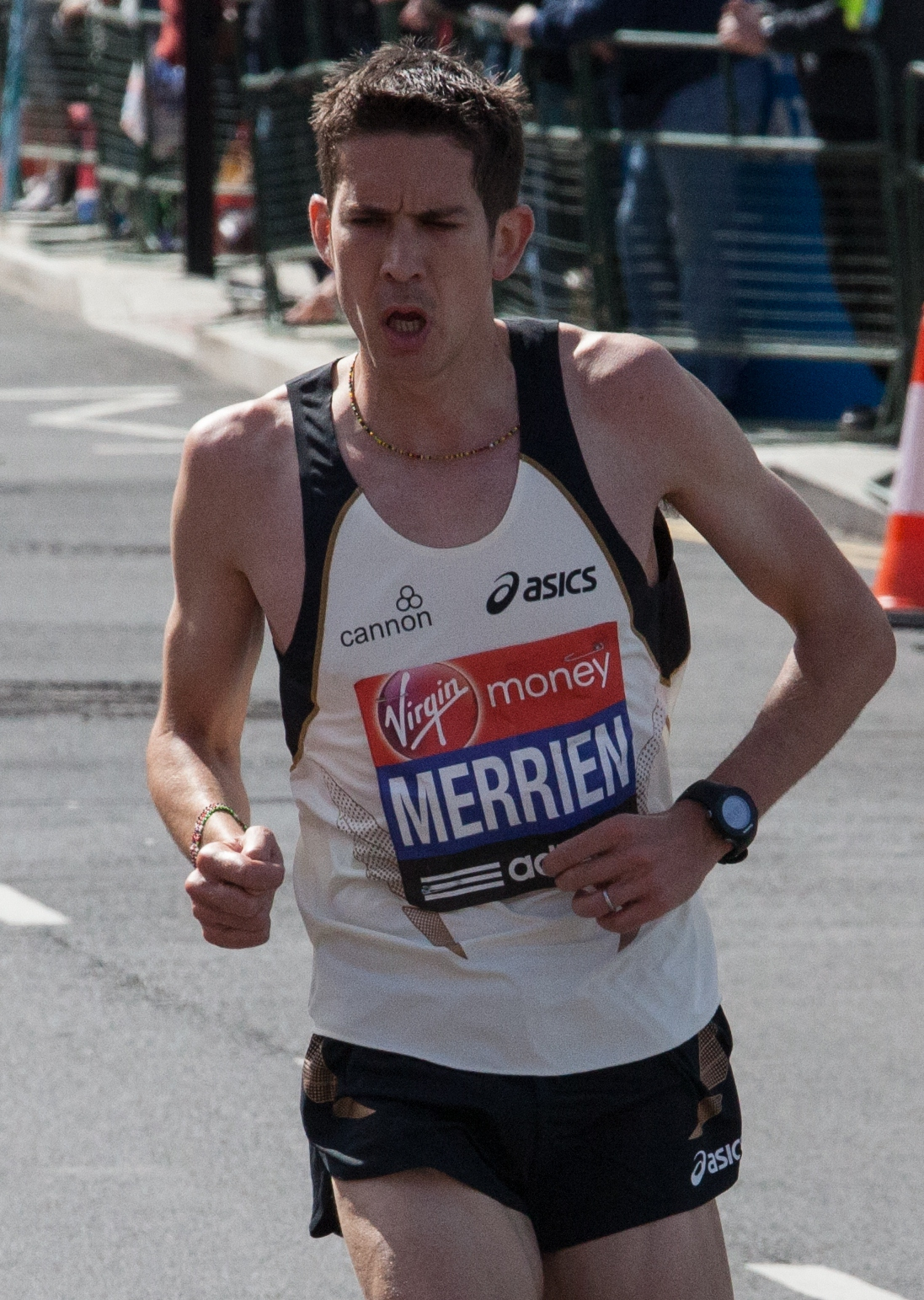
- Lee Merrien at the 2012 London Marathon

Personal information
- Nationality: British (Guernsey)
- Born: 26 April 1979 (age 47) Guernsey
- Height: 1.82 m (6 ft 0 in)
- Weight: 61 kg (134 lb)

Sport
- Country: Great Britain; Guernsey
- Sport: Athletics
- Event(s): 800 m, 1,500 m, 5,000 m, Marathon
- Club: Lee Merrien Running
- Coached by: John Nuttall

Achievements and titles
- World finals: 2002 Commonwealth Games – 1,500 m – 15th 2006 Commonwealth Games – 1,500 m – 15th 2006 Commonwealth Games – 10,000 m – 14th 2010 Commonwealth Games – 5,000 m – 15th 2010 Commonwealth Games – 10,000 m – 14th 2018 Commonwealth Games - Marathon - 8th
- Regional finals: 2010 European Championships – 8th
Medal record
Island Games
Gold medal – first place	2003 Guernsey	1,500 m
Gold medal – first place	2005 Shetland	1,500 m
Gold medal – first place	2005 Shetland	5,000 m
Gold medal – first place	2005 Shetland	4x400 m relay
Gold medal – first place	2007 Rhodes	1,500 m
Gold medal – first place	2007 Rhodes	5,000 m
Gold medal – first place	2009 Åland	1,500 m
Gold medal – first place	2009 Åland	5,000 m
Gold medal – first place	2011 Isle of Wight	Half marathon
Gold medal – first place	2017 Gotland	Half marathon
Silver medal – second place	2001 Isle of Man	1,500 m
Silver medal – second place	2003 Guernsey	800 m
Silver medal – second place	2015 Jersey	Half marathon
Silver medal – second place	2017 Gotland	10,000m
Bronze medal – third place	2001 Isle of Man	800 m

Lee Merrien (born 26 April 1979) is a British middle distance and long-distance runner. He was named to the British team for the 2012 Summer Olympics following a Facebook campaign after he was initially not selected to the team. He has won multiple events at the Island Games for his home of Guernsey.

== Career ==
Merrien competed at his first Island Games in Gotland in 1999, however he did finish in a medal position that year. Representing his home of Guernsey, he went on to win nine gold medals over the next several years at the Island Games in the half marathon, 1,500 m, 5,000 m and 4 × 400 m relay, and also won two silver medals and one bronze. At the 2009 Island Games on the Isle of Wight he set Island Games records in both the 1,500 m and the 5,000 m events.

In the 2011 London Marathon, he set a new personal best of 2 h 14 min 27 s, which was within the "B" qualifying time for the 2012 Summer Olympics and was the fastest British competitor in the race. He admitted afterwards that he had mixed feelings regarding his time, as although it was a new personal best, it wasn't within the "A" qualifying time for the Games. His only previous attempt at the London Marathon was in 2010 when he finished in 12th place.

He finished 17th in the 2012 London Marathon, which was once again the highest placed British competitor in the race. He finished in a time of 2 h 13 min 41 s, a new personal best, just outside the Olympic qualifying time set by UK Athletics at 2 h 12 min. Due to this, he was not chosen for the British team at the 2012 Olympics, with Scott Overall and Dave Webb being chosen for the team, and with the third spot left deliberately empty. His time was inside the "A" time of 2 h 15 min as set by the International Association of Athletics Federations.

This resulted in an online campaign on Facebook to select Merrien for the British team, run by fan Cara Saul. The campaign resulted in 3,000 followers. Merrien appealed against the decision not to select him; his appeal was thrown out by UK Athletics. However, on 27 April, it was announced that the selectors had reversed their decision and added Merrien to the British team for the Olympics. Merrien's response was described as "ecstatic".

In his final race prior to the 2012 Games, he won a half Marathon on Guernsey in June, eight and a half minutes ahead of the second placed athlete. Prior to the games, he completed altitude training in the Pyrenees mountains in Europe, having previous attended camps in Iten, Kenya. At the Olympics he finished 30th in the field, the highest place Brit.

== Personal life ==
Merrien attended the University of Bath, graduating with a degree in Coach Education and Sports Performance. He currently manages a running club. He is the spokesman for charity Male Uprising in Guernsey which aims to raise awareness of prostate, testicular and bowel cancer.
