= Michael Letterlough =

Caymanian hammer thrower

Personal information
- Born: 26 September 1984 (age 41)

Sport
- Sport: Track and field
Medal record
Athletics
Representing Cayman Islands
Island Games
Silver medal – second place	2005 Shetland	Discus throw
Silver medal – second place	2007 Rhodes	Discus throw
Silver medal – second place	2009 Gotland	Discus throw
Silver medal – second place	2011 Isle of Wight	Discus throw
CAC Junior Championships (U17)
Bronze medal – third place	2000 San Juan	Discus throw
CARIFTA Games Junior (U20)
Bronze medal – third place	2002 Nassau	Discus throw
CARIFTA Games Youth (U17)
Silver medal – second place	2000 St. George's	Discus throw
Bronze medal – third place	1999 Fort-de-France	Discus throw

Michael Letterlough (born 26 September 1984) is a Caymanian track and field athlete competing in the hammer throw. After graduating from John Gray High School on Grand Cayman, Letterlough attended Florida International University in Miami and currently trains under the guidance of Anatoliy Bondarchuk in Kamloops, British Columbia.

During the course of his athletic career at Florida International, Letterlough won the 2006 Sun Belt Conference championship, set school records in the hammer throw and weight throw and was named Sun Belt Conference athlete of the week. During this time, he also set Cayman national records in the hammer throw, discus throw, and weight throw and served as the captain for the Cayman Islands team at the 2005 Island Games.

Letterlough graduated from Florida International with a finance degree in 2006, but remained in Florida to continue training and improved his national record in the hammer throw to 58.10 meters in 2007. Later that season, he also represented the Cayman Islands at the Pan American Games. Letterlough then moved north at the end of 2007 to join Bondarchuk's training group in Canada. Since the move, he has steadily increased his national record. He most recently improved the record of 62.54m on 5 June 2011 in Kamloops, British Columbia, Canada. Letterlough also continues to represent the Cayman Islands in international championships and won his fourth Island Games silver medal in 2011.

== Major Competition Results ==
- 2011 Island Games - silver medal
- 2010 Commonwealth Games - thirteenth place
- 2010 Central American and Caribbean Games - eight place
- 2009 Island Games - silver medal
- 2009 Central American and Caribbean Championships - tenth place
- 2008 Central American and Caribbean Championships - sixth place
- 2007 Island Games - silver medal
- 2007 NACAC Championships - fourth place
- 2007 Pan American Games - thirteenth place
- 2006 Central American and Caribbean Games - ninth place
- 2006 Commonwealth Games - thirteenth place
- 2005 Island Games - silver medal
