= Elena Johnson =

Guernsey badminton player

Personal information
- Full name: Elena Clare Johnson
- Born: 2 November 1985 (age 41) Guernsey
- Height: 166 cm (5 ft 5 in)
- Weight: 63 kg (139 lb)

Sport
- Country: Guernsey
- Sport: Badminton
Medal record
Badminton
Representing Guernsey
Island Games
| Gold medal – first place | 2001 Isle of Man | Team event |
| Gold medal – first place | 2003 Guernsey | Women's singles |
| Gold medal – first place | 2003 Guernsey | Team event |
| Gold medal – first place | 2005 Shetland | Team event |
| Gold medal – first place | 2013 Bermuda | Women's singles |
| Gold medal – first place | 2013 Bermuda | Team event |
| Gold medal – first place | 2017 Gotland | Mixed doubles |
| Gold medal – first place | 2017 Gotland | Team event |
| Silver medal – second place | 2001 Isle of Man | Women's singles |
| Silver medal – second place | 2001 Isle of Man | Women's doubles |
| Silver medal – second place | 2003 Guernsey | Women's doubles |
| Silver medal – second place | 2005 Shetland | Women's singles |
| Silver medal – second place | 2005 Shetland | Women's doubles |
| Silver medal – second place | 2019 Gibraltar | Women's doubles |
| Silver medal – second place | 2019 Gibraltar | Mixed team event |
| Bronze medal – third place | 2005 Shetland | Mixed doubles |
| Bronze medal – third place | 2013 Bermuda | Women's doubles |
| Bronze medal – third place | 2017 Gotland | Women's doubles |
| Bronze medal – third place | 2019 Gibraltar | Mixed doubles |
| Bronze medal – third place | 2023 Guernsey | Team event |
| Bronze medal – third place | 2023 Guernsey | Women's doubles |

Elena Clare Johnson (born 2 November 1985) is a badminton player from Guernsey who competed in the Island Games since 1999 and the Commonwealth Games six times. She was the flagbearer for Guernsey at the Birmingham 2022 Commonwealth Games.

== Career ==
In 2010, Johnson attempted to find a doubles partner for the 2011 Island Games in Gayle Lloyd. As Lloyd was deemed just short of the permanent residence status required to compete for Guernsey in the games, Johnson did not compete in women's doubles at the 2011 games.

For the 2021 Island Games in Guernsey, Johnson will be serving as player-manager for the Guernsey Badminton Association.

== Major results ==
- 2001: Island Games (Isle of Man)
  - Badminton, women's singles - 2nd place
  - Badminton, women's doubles - 2nd place
  - Badminton, team event - 1st place
- 2003: English National Championships - Badminton, women's singles - eliminated in opening round
- 2003: Island Games (Guernsey)
  - Badminton, women's singles - 1st place
  - Badminton, team event - 1st place
  - Badminton, women's doubles - 2nd place
- 2005: Island Games (Shetland)
  - Badminton, women's singles - 2nd place
  - Badminton, women's doubles - 2nd place
  - Badminton, mixed doubles - 3rd place
  - Badminton, team event - 1st place
- 2012: Norfolk Open Championship
  - Badminton, women's singles - 1st place
  - Badminton, women's doubles - 1st place - with Kelly Holdway
- 2013: Island Games (Bermuda)
  - Badminton, women's singles - 1st place
  - Badminton, women's doubles - 3rd place
  - Badminton, team event - 1st place
- 2014: Commonwealth Games (Glasgow)
  - Badminton, women's singles - eliminated round of 32
  - Badminton, women's doubles - eliminated round of 32 - with Gayle Lloyd
  - Badminton, mixed doubles - eliminated in first round - with Daniel Penney
- 2017: Island Games (Gotland)
  - Badminton, women's doubles - 3rd place
  - Badminton, mixed doubles - 1st place
  - Badminton, team event - 1st place
- 2018: Commonwealth Games - Badminton, women's doubles - eliminated in round of 16 - with Chloe Le Tissier
- 2019: Island Games (Gibraltar)
  - Badminton, women's doubles - 2nd place - with Chloe Le Tissier
  - Badminton, mixed doubles - 3rd place - with Ove Svejstrup
