= Beach volleyball at the 2019 Island Games =

- Venue: Nuffield Pool (Open Area)
- Dates: 7–12 July

Beach volleyball for the 2019 Island Games, was held at the Nuffield Pool (Open Area), Gibraltar.

== Medal table ==
Rank	Nation	Gold	Silver	Bronze	Total
1	Gotland	1	1	0	2
2	Åland	1	0	0	1
3	Menorca	0	1	0	1
4	Cayman Islands	0	0	1	1
4	Saaremaa	0	0	1	1
Totals (5 entries)		2	2	2	6

== Results ==
Event	Gold	Silver	Bronze
Men	Åland Islands; Aldis Jaundzeikars; Verneri Vetriö	Gotland; Finn Aiden-Joyce; Hannes Brinkborg	Saaremaa; Helar Jalg; Siim Põlluäär
Women	Gotland; Sofia Uddin; Sofia Wahlén	Menorca; Vanesa Bravo; Magda Severa	Cayman Islands; Stefania Gandolfi; Jessica Wolfenden
