= Badminton at the 2023 Island Games =

- Venue: Beau Sejour Leisure Centre and St Sampson’s High
- Dates: 9–14 July
- Nations: 18

Badminton, for the 2023 Island Games, held at Beau Sejour Leisure Centre and St Sampson’s High School, Guernsey in July 2023.

== Medal table ==
* Host nation (Guernsey)

Rank	Nation	Gold	Silver	Bronze	Total
1	Faroe Islands	3	2	4	9
2	Greenland	2	1	0	3
3	Isle of Man	1	1	1	3
4	Guernsey*	0	1	5	6
5	Menorca	0	1	0	1
6	Jersey	0	0	1	1
Totals (6 entries)		6	6	11	23

== Participating islands ==
- Åland Islands
- Bermuda
- Cayman Islands
- Falkland Islands
- Faroe Islands
- Frøya
- Gibraltar
- Gotland
- Greenland
- Guernsey (Host)
- Isle of Man
- Isle of Wight
- Jersey
- Menorca
- Orkney
- Shetland Islands
- Western Isles
- (Anglesey) Ynys Môn

== Results ==
Event	Gold	Silver	Bronze
Men's singles	Jens-Frederik Nielsen; Greenland	Jordan Trebert; Guernsey	Magnus Dal-Christiansen; Faroe Islands
Men's singles	Jens-Frederik Nielsen; Greenland	Jordan Trebert; Guernsey	Jónas Djurhuus; Faroe Islands
Women's singles	Sara Jacobsen; Greenland	Jessica Li; Isle of Man	Emily Trebert; Guernsey
Women's singles	Sara Jacobsen; Greenland	Jessica Li; Isle of Man	Miriam í Grótinum; Faroe Islands
Men's doubles	Faroe Islands; Magnus Dal-Christiansen; Fai Yin Wong	Menorca; Albert Navarro Comes; Eric Navarro Comes	Guernsey; Stuart Hardy; Jordan Trebert
Men's doubles	Faroe Islands; Magnus Dal-Christiansen; Fai Yin Wong	Menorca; Albert Navarro Comes; Eric Navarro Comes	Jersey; Matthew Bignell; Alexander Hutchings
Women's doubles	Isle of Man; Kimberley Clague; Jessica Li	Faroe Islands; Bjarnhild í Buð Justinussen; Sanna Thorkildshøj	Faroe Islands; Miriam í Grótinum; Mia Thorkildshøj
Women's doubles	Isle of Man; Kimberley Clague; Jessica Li	Faroe Islands; Bjarnhild í Buð Justinussen; Sanna Thorkildshøj	Guernsey; Elena Johnson; Chloe Le Tissier
Mixed doubles	Faroe Islands; Mia Thorkildshøj; Fai Yin Wong	Faroe Islands; Magnus Dal-Christiansen; Miriam í Grótinum	Isle of Man; Jessica Li; Matthew Nicholson
Mixed doubles	Faroe Islands; Mia Thorkildshøj; Fai Yin Wong	Faroe Islands; Magnus Dal-Christiansen; Miriam í Grótinum	Guernsey; Stuart Hardy; Chloe Le Tissier
Team	Faroe Islands; Árant Á Mýrini; Magnus Dal-Christiansen; Jónas Djurhuus; Miriam í Grótinum; Ranja Joensen; Bjarnhild í Buð Justinussen; Asbjørn Heide Olsen; Mia Thorkildshøj; Sanna Thorkildshøj; Fai Yin Wong	Greenland; Julian Arleth; Sebastian Bendtsen; Maluk Christoffersen; Nick Jacobsen; Sara Jacobsen; Cecilia Josefsen; Jens-Frederik Nielsen; Thrune Rafaelsen; Tina Rafaelsen; Emilie Sørensen	Guernsey; Carys Batiste; Grace Edwards; Stuart Hardy; Elena Johnson; Chloe Le Tissier; Daniel Penney; Alex Tapp; David Trebert; Emily Trebert; Jordan Trebert
