= Ten-pin bowling at the 2019 Island Games =

Bowling competition in Gibraltar

- Venue: Kings Bastion Leisure Centre
- Dates: 7–12 July

Ten-pin bowling, for the 2019 Island Games, held at Kings Bastion Leisure Centre, Gibraltar in July 2019.

== Medal table ==
Rank	Nation	Gold	Silver	Bronze	Total
1	Gotland	5	0	4	9
2	Åland	4	5	2	11
3	Bermuda	0	4	3	7
Totals (3 entries)		9	9	9	27

== Results ==
=== Men ===
Event	Gold		Silver		Bronze	
Singles	Robert Gustafsson; Gotland	1203	Lamar Richardson; Bermuda	1127	Oskar Welin; Åland	1126
Doubles	Åland Islands; Sebastian Cronholm; Michael Jakobsson	2153	Åland Islands; Jonas Andersson; Oskar Welin	2145	Bermuda; Damien Matthews; David Maycock	2144
Team	Åland Islands; Jonas Andersson; Sebastian Cronholm; Michael Jakobsson; Oskar Welin	5057	Bermuda; Damien Matthews; David Maycock; Blake Raynor; Lamar Richardson	4943	Gotland; Robert Gustafsson; Anders Jacobsson; Claes Johansson; Kevin Stenegärd	4903
Masters	Oskar Welin; Åland		Damien Matthews; Bermuda		Lamar Richardson; Bermuda	

=== Women ===
Event	Gold		Silver		Bronze	
Singles	Sara Pettersson; Gotland	1008	Katarina Sundberg; Åland	963	Camila Olofsson; Gotland	919
Doubles	Gotland; Sara Pettersson; Maria Eklöf	1968	Åland Islands; Katarina Sundberg; Ann Kvarnström	1925	Gotland; Camilla Olofsson; Tina Senitz	1791
Team	Gotland; Maria Eklöf; Camilla Olofsson; Sara Pettersson; Tina Senitz	4677	Åland Islands; Caroline Blomqvist; Ann Kvarnström; Ida Sandström; Katarina Sundberg	4382	Bermuda; Gloria Dill; Florence Simons; Jennifer Stovell; Patrice Tucker	4112
Masters	Camilla Olofsson; Gotland		Ann Kvarnström; Åland		Sara Pettersson; Gotland	

=== Mixed ===
Event	Gold		Silver		Bronze	
Doubles	Åland Islands; Sebastian Cronholm; Ida Sandström	2142	Bermuda; Gloria Dill; David Maycock	2044	Åland Islands; Katarina Sundberg; Oskar Welin	2031
