= Sailboarding at the 2015 Island Games =

Sailboarding, also known as windsurfing, at the 2015 Island Games was held at St Aubin's Bay, Jersey from 28 June to 2 July.

== Medal table ==
* Host nation (Gibraltar)

Rank	Nation	Gold	Silver	Bronze	Total
1	Jersey*	1	1	0	2
2	Guernsey	1	0	1	2
3	Bermuda	0	1	0	1
4	Menorca	0	0	1	1
Totals (4 entries)		2	2	2	6

== Results ==
Event	Gold		Silver		Bronze	
Individual	Stephen Pertegas Melia; Jersey	31	David Kendell; Bermuda	32	Jo Robinson; Guernsey	35
Team	Guernsey; Tim Laine; Sebastian Lovell; Simon Lovell; Jo Robinson	208	Jersey; Andrew Hart; Henry Horton; Michel Millar; Stephen Pertegas Melia	217	Menorca; Miquel Allés Coll; Dámaso De la Cruz Coll; Enric Pons Mir; Marc Riera Pallás	308
