= Athletics at the 2009 Island Games =

Athletics events were held at the 2009 Island Games in Åland, Finland, from June 27–July 4, 2009. For the 13th edition of the Games, 25 teams competed in 15 different sports.

== Men's events ==
Event	Gold		Silver		Bronze	
100 m Wind = +0.8	Wallace Little; Cayman Islands	10.73	Mats Boman; Åland	10.82	Steven Reid; Cayman Islands	10.84
200 m	Robert Ibeh; Cayman Islands	21.60	Jeneko Lottimore Place; Bermuda	21.65	Mats Boman; Åland	21.71
400 m	Tom Druce; Guernsey	47.00	Donald Macleod; Western Isles	48.82	Mihalis Markopoulos; Rhodes	49.81
800 m	Tom Druce; Guernsey	1.52.04	Joseph Wade; Isle of Wight	1.52.52	Andre Kahlström; Gotland	1.54.84
1500 m	Lee Merrien; Guernsey	3.49.58	Joseph Wade; Isle of Wight	3.53.42	Lee Garland; Guernsey	4.02.91
5000 m	Lee Merrien; Guernsey	14.21.35	Janne Holmén; Åland	14.33.10	Thomas Wade; Isle of Wight	15.27.93
10,000 m	Janne Holmén; Åland	30.03.64	Stephen Dawes; Guernsey	32.25.12	Daniel Halksworth; Jersey	32.57.74
110 m hurdles wind -1.5	Glenn Etherington; Guernsey	15.12	Peter Irving; Jersey	15.51	Madis Kallas; Saaremaa	15.52
400 m hurdles	Junior Hines; Cayman Islands	52.67	Peter Irving; Jersey	53.81	Mihalis Seitis; Rhodes	53.83
3000 m steeplechase	Thomas Wade; Isle of Wight	9.35.81	Lee Garland; Guernsey	9.44.21	Darren Gray; Isle of Man	9.47.07
4 × 100 m relay	Cayman Islands; Maxwell Hyman; Wallace Little; Steven Reid; Joseph Suberan	42.12	Isle of Man; Ben Brand; Michael Haslett; Peter Richardson; Thomas Riley	42.77	Isle of Wright; Steven Carter; James Forman; Leon Phillips; Samuel Ratcliffe	43.37
4 × 400 m relay	Guernsey; Matthew Bailey; Tom Druce; Dale Garland; Hywel Robinson	3.12.38	Isle of Man; Ben Brand; Michael Haslett; Peter Richardson; Thomas Riley	3.19.85	Gibraltar; Mohammed Ahammad; Dominic Carroll; Lee Taylor; Daryl Vassallo	3.24.03
Half Marathon	Janne Holmén; Åland	1:06.34	Stephen Dawes; Guernsey	1:14.03	Paul Cameron; Isle of Wight	1:14.39
High jump	Perry Anglin; Cayman Islands	2.07	Omar Wright; Cayman Islands	2.05	Jason Fox; Jersey	2.03
Long jump	Madis Kallas; Saaremaa	+0.2 7.05	Erik Larsson; Gotland	-0.1 6.96	Georgios Kontos; Rhodes	+0.1 6.86
Triple jump	Matthew Barton; Isle of Wight	+1.5 14.99	Raigo Saar; Saaremaa	+0.2 14.49	Stephen de la Haye; Jersey	+1.8 13.86
Shot put	Genro Paas; Saaremaa	16.01	Erik Larsson; Gotland	14.86	Zane Duquemin; Jersey	14.60
Javelin throw	Sander Suurhans; Saaremaa	67.65	Georgios Troumbas; Rhodes	61.88	Jako Lindrop; Saaremaa	57.20
Discus throw	Zane Duquemin; Jersey	50.21	Madis Kallas; Saaremaa	45.66	Erik Larsson; Gotland	43.48
Hammer throw	Andrew Frost; Isle of Wight	68.75	Michael Letterlough; Cayman Islands	57.78	Genro Paas; Saaremaa	53.77
Half Marathon Team	Gotland; Andreas Grönström; Daniel Hejdström; Olof Thunegard	12	Saaremaa; Tõnis Juulik; Kalev Õisnurm; Ando Õitspuu	12	Guernsey; Stephen Dawes; Mark Mercier; Ronan Shally	15

== Women’s events ==
Event	Gold		Silver		Bronze	
100 m	Hanna Wiss; Åland	12.38	Kylie Robilliard; Guernsey	12.66	Faith Norster; Isle of Wight	12.80
200 m wind +1.7	Gemma Dawkins; Jersey	25.08	Harriet Pryke; Isle of Man	25.20	Mags MacRae; Orkney	25.46
400 m	Gemma Dawkins; Jersey	55.72	Harriet Pryke; Isle of Man	56.46	Sarah Dowling; Isle of Man	57.34
800 m	Emma Leask; Shetland Islands	2.15.39	Eilidh C Mackenzie; Western Isles	2.15.45	Kim Baglietto; Gibraltar	2.15.56
1500 m	Eilidh C Mackenzie; Western Isles	4.34.83	Rachael Franklin; Isle of Man	4.36.99	Felicity Johnson - Deeley; Jersey	4.39.17
5000 m	Louise Perrio; Guernsey	17.37.15	Martine Scholes; Guernsey	17.37.81	Gemma Astin; Isle of Man	17.51.23
10,000 m	Louise Perrio; Guernsey	37.53.45	Súsanna Skylv Sørensen; Faroe Islands	37.59.33	Alison Mary Campbell; Western Isles	38.02.30
100 m hurdles wind -0.9	Kylie Robilliard; Guernsey	14.48	Julia Källgren; Åland	16.07	Angela Lopez; Menorca	16.25
400 m hurdles	Sophie Twinam; Jersey	1.03.29	Angela Lopez; Menorca	1.03.43	Hazel Le Cornu; Jersey	1.05.02
3000m Steeplechase – not held
4 × 100 m relay	Isle of Man; Sarah Dowling; Ciara McDonnell; Harriet Pryke; Danielle Ross	48.56	Jersey; Gemma Dawkins; Hazel Le Cornu; Jenna Murphy; Sophie Twinam	49.54	Isle of Wright; Helen Davis; Faith Norster; Brogan Percy; Emily Young	50.08
4 × 400 m relay	Jersey; Gemma Dawkins; Hazel Le Cornu; Katie Silva; Sophie Twinam	3:54.97	Isle of Wight; Sarah Dowling; Rachael Franklin; Ciara McDonnell; Harriet Pryke	3:56.69	Shetland Islands; Allie Elphinstone; Emma Leask; Megan Smith; Inga Woods	4:07.48
Half Marathon	Martine Scholes; Guernsey	1.23.29	Turi Malme; Hitra	1.23.52	Louise Perrio; Guernsey	1.25.06
High jump	Ashleigh Nalty; Cayman Islands	1.71	Jenna Murphy; Jersey	1.65	Ellinor Sundstrand; Gotland	1.59
High jump	Ashleigh Nalty; Cayman Islands	1.71	Jenna Murphy; Jersey	1.65	Hollie Bass; Isle of Man	1.59
Long jump	Hanna Wiss; Åland	+0.9 5.59	Ellinor Sundstrand; Gotland	+1.0 5.39	Emily Young; Isle of Wight	+0.5 5.21
Triple jump	Hanna Wiss; Åland	+1.8 11.33	Ellinor Sundstrand; Gotland	+0.9 11.28	Nathalie Jansson; Åland	+1.0 10.97
Shot put	Kathryn Rothwell; Jersey	11.15	Claire Wilson; Orkney	11.04	Pille-Riin Toomsalu; Saaremaa	10.89
Javelin throw	Helen Davis; Isle of Wight	35.67	Pille-Riin Toomsalu; Saaremaa	30.55	Teresia Snäckerström; Gotland	29.86
Discus throw	Kathryn Rothwell; Jersey	39.53	Alexandra Terry; Cayman Islands	39.33	Anu Vares; Saaremaa	35.56
Hammer throw	Marit Zahkna; Isle of Man	48.89	Amy Church; Isle of Wight	46.21	Annie Henriksson; Gotland	41.30
Half Marathon Team	Guernsey; Louise Perrio; Martine Scholes	4	Åland; Karina Danielsson; Åsa Karlsson; Carita Södergård	19	Western Isles; Alison Mary Campbell; Mairi MacCormick	22
