= Beach volleyball at the 2017 Island Games =

- Dates: June 24 – 30
- Host city: Gotland, Sweden
- Venue: Visborg Sportscenter, Visby
- Level: Senior

Beach volleyball, for the 2017 Island Games, held at the ICA Maxi Arena, Visby, Gotland, Sweden in June 2017.

== Medal table ==
* Host nation (Gotland)

Rank	Nation	Gold	Silver	Bronze	Total
1	Saare County	1	1	0	2
2	Gotland*	1	0	1	2
3	Menorca	0	1	0	1
4	Jersey	0	0	1	1
Totals (4 entries)		2	2	2	6

== Results ==
Event	Gold	Silver	Bronze
Men	Gotland; Hannes Brinkborg; Viktor Jonsson	Saare County; Jalg Helar; Siim Põlluäär	Jersey; Berislav Bobus; Ruben Viera
Women	Saare County; Gerli Gull; Liisel Nelis	Menorca; Magda Krakilova; Vanesa Ruiz Bravo	Gotland; Sofia Udin; Sofia Wahlén
