= Triathlon at the 2015 Island Games =

Triathlon at the 2015 Island Games was held on 28 June at Les Jardins de la Mer, Jersey.

== Medal table ==
* Host nation (Gibraltar)

Rank	Nation	Gold	Silver	Bronze	Total
1	Jersey*	3	1	2	6
2	Faroe Islands	1	0	0	1
3	Guernsey	0	2	0	2
4	Isle of Man	0	1	0	1
5	Gibraltar	0	0	1	1
5	Shetland	0	0	1	1
Totals (6 entries)		4	4	4	12

== Results ==
Event	Gold		Silver		Bronze	
Men's	Daniel Halksworth (JEY)	1:57:09.84	James Travers (GGY)	2:02:22.49	Tom Perchard (JEY)	2:04:43.69
Men's Team	Jersey; Michael Charlton; Daniel Halksworth; Demri Mitchell; Tom Perchard; Nathan Woodland	6:09:05	Guernsey; Ben Creasey; Matthew Dorian; James Gower; Bob Guilbert; Sean Murphy; Alan Rowe; Max Thornton; James Travers	6:18:32	Gibraltar; Mark Chichon; Andrew Gordon; Edgar Harper; Keith Laguea; Robert Matto; Tobie Muir; Sean Randall; Christopher Redondo; Akhill Viz; Christopher Walker	6:23:55
Women's	Kariana Ottosen (FRO)	2:16:48.10	Joanne Gorrod (JEY)	2:19:34.60	Samantha Lee (JEY)	2:19:47.95
Women's Team	Jersey; Joanne Gorrod; Samantha Lee; Arlene Lewis; Jennifer O'Brien; Della Roderick; Philippa Worth	4:39:23	Isle of Man; Lynsey Elliott; Hannah Howitt; Karen Shimmin	4:52:51	Shetland; Sanna Aitken; Wendy Hatrick; Lynsey Henderson; Frances Hutchison; Louise Parr	4:57:42
