= Judo at the 2019 Island Games =

- Venue: Devils Tower Camp – Gym
- Dates: 8–11 July

Judo, for the 2019 Island Games, held at the Devils Tower Camp - Gym, Gibraltar in July 2019.

== Medal table ==
* Host nation (Gibraltar)

Rank	Nation	Gold	Silver	Bronze	Total
1	Faroe Islands	5	2	7	14
2	Isle of Wight	3	0	1	4
3	Menorca	2	5	5	12
4	Åland	2	1	5	8
5	Gotland	2	0	0	2
6	Saaremaa	0	3	0	3
7	Guernsey	0	1	2	3
8	Gibraltar*	0	1	0	1
9	Jersey	0	0	3	3
Totals (9 entries)		14	13	23	50

== Results ==
=== Men ===
Event	Gold	Silver	Bronze
60 kg	Aso Hosseini; Åland	Damià Marí; Menorca	Pau Aguado; Menorca
60 kg	Aso Hosseini; Åland	Damià Marí; Menorca	Aiden Ward; Jersey
66 kg	Bárður Hentze Lenvig; Faroe Islands	Taavi Eigo; Saaremaa	Linus Höglund; Åland
66 kg	Bárður Hentze Lenvig; Faroe Islands	Taavi Eigo; Saaremaa	Dánjal á Krákusteini; Faroe Islands
73 kg	Oscar Olives; Menorca	Jógvan Páll Kristiansen; Faroe Islands	Gunnar Magnussen; Faroe Islands
73 kg	Oscar Olives; Menorca	Jógvan Páll Kristiansen; Faroe Islands	Lewis Bourgaize; Guernsey
81 kg	Búgvi Poulsen; Faroe Islands	Scott Ashley; Menorca	Jose Luís Arnau; Menorca
81 kg	Búgvi Poulsen; Faroe Islands	Scott Ashley; Menorca	William Baker; Jersey
81 kg	Búgvi Poulsen; Faroe Islands	Scott Ashley; Menorca	Louis Plevin; Guernsey
90 kg	Soni Sorgetz; Menorca	Anders Berndtsson; Åland	Oiol Masso; Menorca
90 kg	Soni Sorgetz; Menorca	Anders Berndtsson; Åland	Sigmundur Johansen; Faroe Islands
100 kg	Petur Sigurð Johannesen; Faroe Islands	Madis Laid; Saaremaa	Charles Tromans; Jersey
100 kg	Petur Sigurð Johannesen; Faroe Islands	Madis Laid; Saaremaa	Benjamin Maher; Isle of Wight
+100 kg	Edvard Sigurdson Johannesen; Faroe Islands	Ethaniel Jeffries-mor; Gibraltar	not awarded
Open	Daniel Blinkhorn; Isle of Wight	Louis Plevin; Guernsey	Petur Sigurð Johannesen; Faroe Islands
Open	Daniel Blinkhorn; Isle of Wight	Louis Plevin; Guernsey	Edvard Sigurdson Johannesen; Faroe Islands
Team	Faroe Islands; Hans Glerfoss; Petur Sigurð Johannesen; Sigmundur Johansen; Jógvan Páll Kristiansen; Bárður Hentze Lenvig; Gunnar Magnussen; Búgvi Poulsen; Nicolaj Skoubo	Saaremaa; Taavi Eigo; Marko Kesküla; Madis Laid; Marek Mägi; Robert Tomingas; Mario Väin	Åland Islands; Anders Berndtsson; Linus Höglund; Aso Hosseini; Konstantin Karpov; Jonas Lindqvist; Leonard Mattsson; Valter Woivalin
Team	Faroe Islands; Hans Glerfoss; Petur Sigurð Johannesen; Sigmundur Johansen; Jógvan Páll Kristiansen; Bárður Hentze Lenvig; Gunnar Magnussen; Búgvi Poulsen; Nicolaj Skoubo	Saaremaa; Taavi Eigo; Marko Kesküla; Madis Laid; Marek Mägi; Robert Tomingas; Mario Väin	Menorca; Pau Aguado; Jose Luís Arnau; Scott Ashley; Damià Marí; Oriol Masso; Oscr Olives; Soni Sorgetz

=== Women ===
Event	Gold	Silver	Bronze
52 kg	Hannah Niven; Isle of Wight	Mónica Torres; Menorca	Maiken Eivinnsdóttir Bringsberg; Faroe Islands
52 kg	Hannah Niven; Isle of Wight	Mónica Torres; Menorca	Maud Wickström; Åland
63 kg	Emily Niven; Isle of Wight	Tania Andreu; Menorca	Sanna Willford; Åland
63 kg	Emily Niven; Isle of Wight	Tania Andreu; Menorca	Sija Johannsen; Faroe Islands
70 kg	Emma Pasanen; Åland	not awarded	not awarded
78 kg	Sija Johannsen; Gotland	Sanna Nolsøe Djurhuus; Faroe Islands	not awarded
Open	Ilse Vuijsters Hammarström; Gotland	Tania Andreu; Menorca	Llucia Vinent; Menorca
Open	Ilse Vuijsters Hammarström; Gotland	Tania Andreu; Menorca	Emma Pasanen; Åland
