= Table tennis at the 2019 Island Games =

- Venue: St Joseph's Middle School (Sports Hall)
- Dates: 7–12 July

Table tennis, for the 2019 Island Games, held at the St Joseph's Middle School (Sports Hall), Gibraltar in July 2019.

== Medal table ==
Rank	Nation	Gold	Silver	Bronze	Total
1	Åland	2	0	0	2
2	Guernsey	1	2	3	6
3	Greenland	1	2	1	4
4	Jersey	1	1	1	3
5	Gotland	1	0	2	3
6	Isle of Wight	0	1	2	3
7	Isle of Man	0	0	2	2
8	Faroe Islands	0	0	1	1
Totals (8 entries)		6	6	12	24

== Results ==
Event	Gold	Silver	Bronze
Men's singles	Ivik Nielsen; Greenland	Garry Dodd; Guernsey	George Downing; Isle of Wight
Men's singles	Ivik Nielsen; Greenland	Garry Dodd; Guernsey	Jordan Luke Wykes; Jersey
Women's singles	Marina Donner; Åland Islands	Karlinannguaq Lundblad; Greenland	Katerine Vinas; Isle of Man
Women's singles	Marina Donner; Åland Islands	Karlinannguaq Lundblad; Greenland	Dawn Morgan; Guernsey
Men's doubles	Jersey; Luc Miller; Jordan Luke Wykes	Greenland; Aqqalu Nielsen; Ivik Nielsen	Isle of Wight; Daniel Burns; George Downing
Men's doubles	Jersey; Luc Miller; Jordan Luke Wykes	Greenland; Aqqalu Nielsen; Ivik Nielsen	Guernsey; Garry Dodd; Benjamin Foss
Women's doubles	Gotland; Evelina Carlsson; Elin Schwartz	Guernsey; Paula Le Ber; Dawn Morgan	Faroe Islands; Anna Mikkjalsdóttir; Rakul Mikkjalsdóttir
Women's doubles	Gotland; Evelina Carlsson; Elin Schwartz	Guernsey; Paula Le Ber; Dawn Morgan	Isle of Man; Kerenza Baker; Katherine Vinas
Mixed doubles	Åland Islands; Marina Donner; Johan Pettersson	Isle of Wight; George Downing; Temeesha Hobbs	Gotland; Evelina Carlsson; Max Hedbom
Mixed doubles	Åland Islands; Marina Donner; Johan Pettersson	Isle of Wight; George Downing; Temeesha Hobbs	Guernsey; Garry Dodd; Dawn Morgan
Team	Guernsey; Garry Dodd; Benjamin Foss; Daisy Kershaw; Samantha Kershaw; Paula Le Ber; Dawn Morgan; Joshua Stacey; Lawrence Stacey	Jersey; Irene Chloe Bree; Tyler Peter Gosselin; Karen Lynn Lefebvre; Luc Miler; Jack Matthew Mills; Jordan Lyke Wykes	Gotland; Evelina Carlsson; Ola Granlund; Max Hedbom; Marcus Jarfjord; Lars Oxenwaldt; Elin Schwartz
Team	Guernsey; Garry Dodd; Benjamin Foss; Daisy Kershaw; Samantha Kershaw; Paula Le Ber; Dawn Morgan; Joshua Stacey; Lawrence Stacey	Jersey; Irene Chloe Bree; Tyler Peter Gosselin; Karen Lynn Lefebvre; Luc Miler; Jack Matthew Mills; Jordan Lyke Wykes	Greenland; Karlinannguaq Lundblad; Aqqalu Nielsen; Ivik Nielsen; Poul Jørgen Petersen; Aviana Mariane Rødgaard; Pipaluk Serubabelsen
