= Beach volleyball at the 2015 Island Games =

Beach Volleyball at the 2015 Island Games was held at Saint Helier Weighbridge from 29 June to 2 July.

== Medal table ==
* Host nation (Gibraltar)

Rank	Nation	Gold	Silver	Bronze	Total
1	Cayman Islands	1	0	0	1
1	Gotland	1	0	0	1
3	Saare County	0	2	0	2
4	Jersey*	0	0	1	1
4	Menorca	0	0	1	1
Totals (5 entries)		2	2	2	6

== Results ==
Event	Gold	Silver	Bronze
Men	Gotland; Hannes Brinkborg; Viktor Johnsson	Saare County; Helar Jalg; Siim Põlluäär	Jersey; Berislav Bobus; Ruben Vieira
Women	Cayman Islands; Stefania Gandolfi; Jessica Wolfenden	Saare County; Kadi Mägi; Kaia Mägi	Menorca; Maria Bonafont Vidal; Vanesa Ruiz Bravo
