= 2003 Island Games =

International multi-sport event

- Host: Guernsey
- Teams: 23 islands
- Athletes: 2129
- Events: 16
- Opening: 28 June 2003
- Closing: 4 July 2003
- Opened by: Charles, Prince of Wales
- Main venue: Footes Lane

The 2003 Island Games were the tenth edition of the Island Games, and were held in Guernsey, from 28 June to July 4, 2003.

== Medal table ==
* Host nation (Guernsey)

Rank	Nation	Gold	Silver	Bronze	Total
1	Guernsey*	55	35	38	128
2	Jersey	37	43	35	115
3	Isle of Man	29	28	31	88
4	Bermuda	15	14	8	37
5	Gotland	11	12	9	32
6	Cayman Islands	11	10	8	29
7	Isle of Wight	10	10	19	39
8	Faroe Islands	6	10	12	28
9	Åland	4	13	4	21
10	Saaremaa	4	7	9	20
11	Gibraltar	4	6	8	18
12	Shetland	4	3	9	16
13	(Wales) Ynys Môn/Anglesey	3	0	3	6
14	Rhodes	2	3	4	9
15	Greenland	2	1	5	8
16	Sark	0	2	0	2
17	Falkland Islands	0	1	2	3
18	Orkney Islands	0	0	1	1
19	Alderney	0	0	0	0
19	Frøya	0	0	0	0
19	Hitra	0	0	0	0
19	Prince Edward Island	0	0	0	0
19	Saint Helena	0	0	0	0
Totals (23 entries)		197	198	205	600

== Sports ==
The sports chosen for the games were:

- Archery - see results
- Athletics - see results
- Badminton - see results
- Basketball - see results
- Cycling - see results
- Football (2)
- Golf - see results
- Gymnastics - see results
- Sailboarding - see results
- Sailing - see results
- Shooting - see results
- Swimming - see results
- Table tennis - see results
- Tennis - see results
- Triathlon - see results
- Volleyball - see results
