= 2005 Island Games =

International multi-sport event

- Host: Shetland, Scotland
- Teams: 24 islands
- Athletes: ~ 2400
- Events: 14
- Opening: July 9, 2005
- Closing: July 15, 2005
- Opened by: Elizabeth II

The 2005 Island Games were the 11th edition of the Island Games, and were held in Shetland, Scotland, from July 9 to 15, 2005.

== Medal table ==
* Host nation (Shetland)

Rank	Nation	Gold	Silver	Bronze	Total
1	Guernsey	40	38	29	107
2	Isle of Man	34	35	23	92
3	Jersey	33	28	32	93
4	Bermuda	16	16	14	46
5	Faroe Islands	14	11	20	45
6	Gotland	12	6	12	30
7	Shetland*	10	14	22	46
8	Cayman Islands	7	6	5	18
9	Gibraltar	7	5	4	16
10	Isle of Wight	4	6	14	24
11	(Wales) Ynys Môn/Anglesey	4	2	2	8
12	Åland	3	8	6	17
13	Saaremaa	3	3	1	7
14	Rhodes	3	2	2	7
15	Orkney	2	3	5	10
16	Sark	1	3	1	5
17	Greenland	1	2	3	6
18	Western Isles	0	1	5	6
19	Alderney	0	1	2	3
20	Falkland Islands	0	0	0	0
20	Frøya	0	0	0	0
20	Hitra Municipality	0	0	0	0
20	Prince Edward Island	0	0	0	0
20	Saint Helena	0	0	0	0
Totals (24 entries)		194	190	202	586

== Sports ==
The sports chosen for the games were:

- Archery - see results
- Athletics - see results
- Badminton - see results
- Cycling - see results
- Football (2)
- Golf - see results
- Gymnastics - see results
- Indoor bowls - see results
- Sailboarding - see results
- Sailing - see results
- Shooting - see results
- Squash - see results
- Swimming - see results
- Table tennis - see results
- Volleyball - see results
