= 2009 Island Games =

International multi-sport event

- Host: Åland
- Teams: 25 islands
- Events: 14
- Opening: June 27, 2009
- Closing: July 4, 2009
- Opened by: Tarja Halonen
- Main venue: Wiklöf Holding Arena

The XIII Island Games were held in Åland, Finland, June 27-July 4, 2009. For the 13th edition of the Games, 25 teams competed in 14 different sports.

== Participating Countries ==
24 islands competed in the 2009 Island Games. They were:

- Åland Islands
- Alderney
- Bermuda
- Cayman Islands
- Falkland Islands
- Faroe Islands
- Frøya
- Gibraltar
- Gotland
- Greenland
- Guernsey
- Hitra
- Isle of Man
- Isle of Wight
- Jersey
- Menorca
- Orkney
- ~~Prince Edward Island~~
- Rhodes
- Saaremaa
- Sark
- Shetland
- Saint Helena
- Western Isles
- (Anglesey) Ynys Môn

Prince Edward Island was set to participate, but a lack of funding from their government caused their withdrawal from the event, and subsequent resignation from the International Island Games Association.

== Medal table ==
* Host nation (Åland)

Rank	Nation	Gold	Silver	Bronze	Total
1	Faroe Islands	34	23	24	81
2	Isle of Man	29	30	29	88
3	Jersey	24	37	19	80
4	Guernsey	21	12	27	60
5	Gotland	21	11	23	55
6	Åland*	16	19	18	53
7	Bermuda	14	6	12	32
8	Menorca	9	7	11	27
9	Cayman Islands	7	4	3	14
10	Saare County	6	9	10	25
11	Isle of Wight	4	6	8	18
12	Gibraltar	4	3	8	15
13	Rhodes	3	8	7	18
14	Shetland	2	1	7	10
15	Greenland	1	4	3	8
16	Orkney	1	2	3	6
17	Western Isles	1	2	2	5
17	(Wales) Ynys Môn/Anglesey	1	2	2	5
19	Hitra Municipality	0	2	0	2
19	Sark	0	2	0	2
21	Alderney	0	0	0	0
21	Falkland Islands	0	0	0	0
21	Frøya	0	0	0	0
21	Prince Edward Island	0	0	0	0
21	Saint Helena	0	0	0	0
Totals (25 entries)		198	190	216	604

== Sports ==
The sports chosen for the games were:

- Archery – see results
- Athletics – see results
- Badminton – see results
- Basketball – see results
- Football (men's, women's)
- Golf – see results
- Gymnastics – see results
- Judo – see results
- Sailing – see results
- Shooting – see results
- Swimming – see results
- Table tennis – see results
- Tennis – see results
- Volleyball – see results
