= 2017 Island Games =

International multi-sport event

- Host: Gotland
- Teams: 23 islands
- Athletes: ~2,500
- Events: 14 sports
- Opening: 24 June 2017
- Closing: 30 June 2017
- Opened by: Carl XVI Gustaf of Sweden
- Main venue: Gutavallen; ICA Maxi Arena

The XVII Island Games (also known as the 2017 NatWest Island Games for sponsorship reasons) were held in Gotland, Sweden, from 24 to 30 June 2017. This was the second time that the island hosted the Games, the first being in 1999.

== Participating islands ==
23 island entities of the IIGA, from Europe, South Atlantic and the Caribbean area, competed in these Games. Rhodes originally planned to take part, but later withdrew on 31 May 2017 due to the financial situation in Greece.

- Åland Islands
- Alderney
- Bermuda
- Cayman Islands
- Falkland Islands
- Faroe Islands
- Frøya
- Gibraltar
- Gotland (Host)
- Greenland
- Guernsey
- Hitra
- Isle of Man
- Isle of Wight
- Jersey
- Menorca
- Orkney
- Saaremaa
- Sark
- Shetland Islands
- (Saint Helena) St. Helena
- Western Isles
- (Anglesey) Ynys Môn

== Sports ==
Numbers in parentheses indicate the number of medal events contested in each sport.

- Archery (14)
- Athletics (41)
- Badminton (6)
- Basketball (2)
- Cycling (20)
  - Mountain biking (8)
  - Road (4)
  - Time trial (4)
  - Town centre criterium (4)
- Football (2)
- Golf (4)
- Gymnastics (24)
- Shooting (41)
- Swimming (43)
- Table tennis (6)
- Tennis (7)
- Triathlon (4)
- Volleyball
  - Beach volleyball (2)
  - Indoor volleyball (2)

== Medal table ==
Updated at 30 June 2017

* Host nation (Gotland)

Rank	Nation	Gold	Silver	Bronze	Total
1	Isle of Man	39	36	26	101
2	Faroe Islands	30	27	30	87
3	Jersey	29	21	35	85
4	Guernsey	27	35	32	94
5	Gotland*	23	19	20	62
6	Saare County	17	8	7	32
7	Western Isles	10	3	1	14
8	Åland	9	4	14	27
9	Isle of Wight	7	12	7	26
10	Cayman Islands	7	10	8	25
11	Gibraltar	6	8	12	26
12	Menorca	6	6	8	20
13	Shetland	4	5	5	14
14	Bermuda	2	13	7	22
15	(Saint Helena) St. Helena	2	1	2	5
16	Orkney	2	0	5	7
17	Greenland	1	5	0	6
18	(Anglesey) Ynys Môn	1	4	4	9
19	Hitra Municipality	1	1	2	4
20	Falkland Islands	0	0	1	1
20	Sark	0	0	1	1
22	Alderney	0	0	0	0
22	Frøya	0	0	0	0
Totals (23 entries)		223	218	227	668
