= 2015 Island Games =

International multi-sport event

- Host: Jersey
- Teams: 24 islands
- Athletes: 3,000
- Events: 14 sports
- Opening: 27 June 2015
- Closing: 3 July 2015
- Opened by: William Bailhache
- Main venue: FB Fields

The XVI Island Games (also known as the 2015 NatWest Island Games for sponsorship reasons) were held in Jersey, Channel Islands, from 27 June to 3 July 2015. This was the second time the island hosted the games, the first being in 1997.

The week-long event saw around 3,000 competitors from 24 islands take part in 14 sports. The official mascot of the games was a real-life infant silverback gorilla named Indigo who lives at Durrell Wildlife Park in Trinity, Jersey.

== Participating islands ==
24 island entities of the IIGA, from Europe, South Atlantic and the Caribbean area, competed in these Games.

- Åland Islands
- Alderney
- Bermuda
- Cayman Islands
- Falkland Islands
- Faroe Islands
- Frøya
- Gibraltar
- Gotland
- Greenland
- Guernsey
- Hitra
- Isle of Man
- Isle of Wight
- Jersey (Host)
- Menorca
- Orkney
- Rhodes
- Saaremaa
- Sark
- Shetland Islands
- (Saint Helena) St. Helena
- Western Isles
- (Anglesey) Ynys Môn

== Sports ==
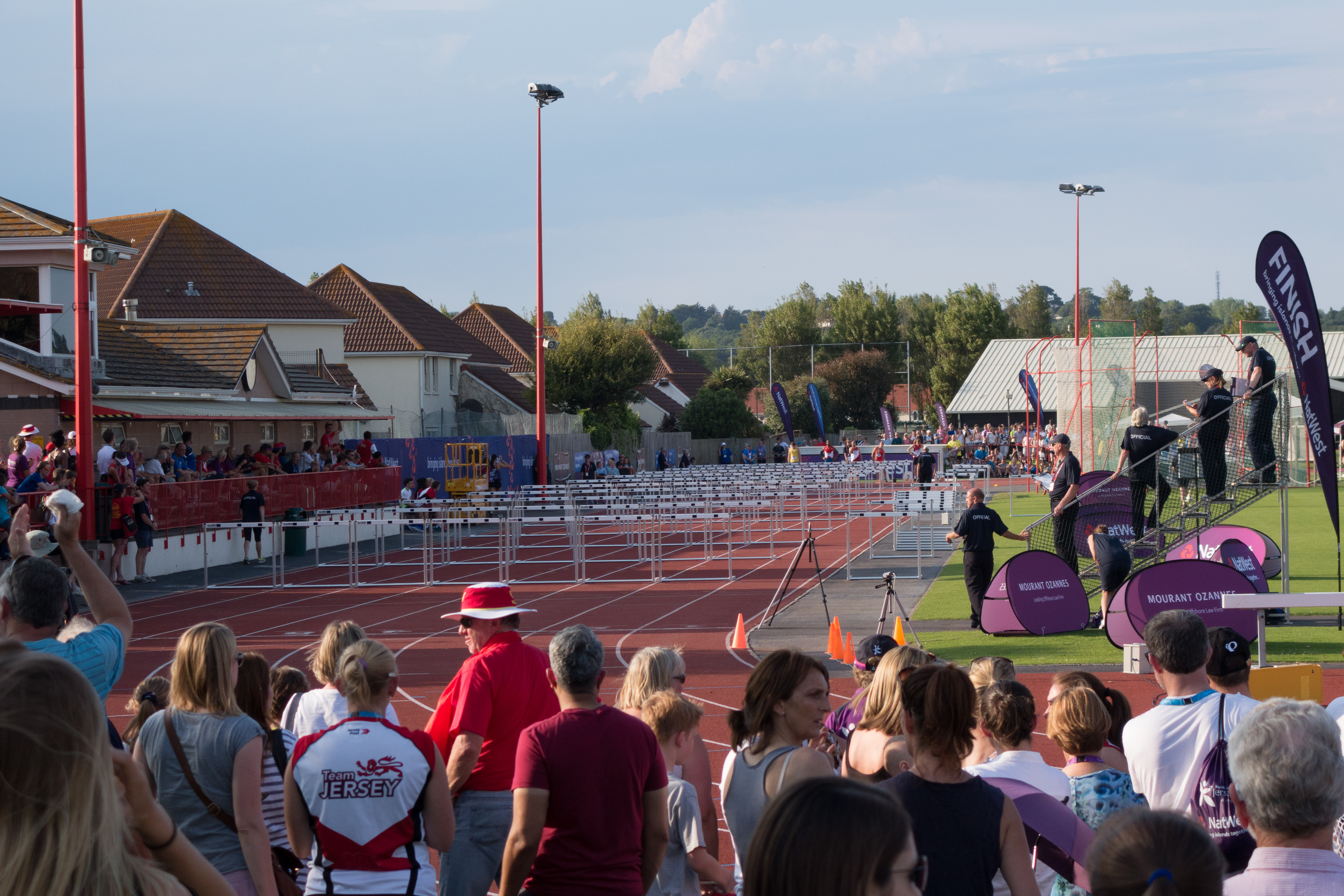
110m hurdles men finals at FB Fields on 30 June 2015.

Numbers in parentheses indicate the number of medal events contested in each sport.

- Archery (12)
- Athletics (42)
- Badminton (6)
- Basketball (2)
- Cycling (20)
  - Mountain biking (8)
  - Road (4)
  - Time trial (4)
  - Town centre criterium (4)
- Football (2)
- Golf (4)
- Sailboarding (2)
- Sailing (3)
- Shooting (62)
- Swimming (42)
- Table tennis (6)
- Tennis (7)
- Triathlon (4)
- Volleyball
  - Beach volleyball (2)
  - Indoor volleyball (2)
- Note: Archery and table tennis make their return to the Island Games. However, gymnastics and squash were dropped from these Games.

== Medal table ==
* Host nation (Jersey)

Final medal table
Rank	Nation	Gold	Silver	Bronze	Total
1	Jersey*	50	53	30	133
2	Isle of Man	34	27	29	90
3	Guernsey	28	25	42	95
4	Faroe Islands	18	18	24	60
5	Gotland	17	8	16	41
6	Cayman Islands	14	11	8	33
7	Isle of Wight	10	13	12	35
8	Saare County	7	10	3	20
9	Western Isles	7	6	6	19
10	Shetland	6	8	9	23
11	Gibraltar	6	5	6	17
12	Bermuda	5	7	4	16
13	(Anglesey) Ynys Môn	5	0	3	8
14	Åland	3	9	12	24
15	Menorca	3	6	6	15
16	Hitra Municipality	2	3	4	9
17	Sark	1	1	2	4
18	Rhodes	1	1	0	2
19	Greenland	1	0	0	1
20	Orkney	0	2	3	5
21	Falkland Islands	0	2	0	2
22	Saint Helena	0	0	1	1
23	Alderney	0	0	0	0
23	Frøya	0	0	0	0
Totals (24 entries)		218	215	220	653
