= 2019 Island Games =

International multi-sport event

- Host: Gibraltar
- Teams: 24 islands
- Athletes: ≈2,000
- Events: 14 sports
- Opening: 6 July 2019
- Closing: 12 July 2019
- Opened by: Ed Davis

The XVIII Island Games (officially the 2019 NatWest Island Games) were held in the British Overseas Territory of Gibraltar between 6 and 12 July 2019. This was the second time the territory hosted the Games, the first being in 1995.

The 2019 Games did not include archery, cycling, football, or volleyball, which had been part of all previous games since 1985, due to the lack of venues. They were replaced by tenpin bowling, judo, and squash. Gibraltar's sports facilities were greatly redeveloped throughout 2018. Cycling was subsequently included in the list of events on the Games official website, while the 2019 Inter Games Football Tournament was announced as a substitute for the lack of football.

== Host ==
The Faroe Islands were initially scheduled to stage the 2019 games, with the 2021 games taking place in Menorca, but in 2014 the hosts were swapped following issues with the Faroese facilities being ready in time. Menorca then withdrew from hosting the 2019 games in July 2015 following a change in government. After the Isle of Man and 2015 hosts Jersey confirmed that they would not apply as replacements, Gibraltar announced in August their intention to host the games, and were officially announced as hosts in April 2016.

On 2 May 2018 it was announced that Ynys Môn would hold an unofficial football tournament to replace the absence of football in the Island Games. Islands that are regulars to the Games were expected to attend.

== Participating islands ==
22 island entities of the IIGA, from Europe, South Atlantic and the Caribbean area, competed in these Games. Both Rhodes and Frøya did not participate in this edition.

- Åland Islands
- Alderney
- Bermuda
- Cayman Islands
- Falkland Islands
- Faroe Islands
- Gibraltar (Host)
- Gotland
- Greenland
- Guernsey
- Hitra
- Isle of Man
- Isle of Wight
- Jersey
- Menorca
- Orkney
- Saaremaa
- Saint Helena
- Sark
- Shetland Islands
- Western Isles
- Ynys Môn

== Sports ==
Numbers in parentheses indicate the number of medal events contested in each sport.

- Athletics (38)
- Badminton (6)
- Basketball (2)
- Cycling (12)
- Judo (14)
- Sailing (3)
- Shooting (39)
- Squash (6)
- Swimming (45)
- Table tennis (6)
- Ten-pin bowling (9)
- Tennis (7)
- Triathlon (4)
- Beach volleyball (2)

== Venues ==
Sport	Venue
Shooting	Rifle Shooting Range, IPSC Shooting Range
Basketball & Tennis	Tercentenary Hall & Bayside Sports Complex
Judo	Devils Tower Camp Gym
Triathlon	Eastern Beach
Ten Pin Bowling	Kings Bastion Leisure Centre
Sailing	Royal Gibraltar Yacht Club
Tennis	Sandpits Lawn Tennis Club
Table Tennis	St Joseph's Middle School
Shooting	Clay Shooting Range
Athletics, Shooting & Swimming	Lathbury Sports Complex
Beach Volleyball	Camp Bay
Badminton & Squash	Europa Point Sports Complex

== Medal table ==
* Host nation (Gibraltar)

Rank	Nation	Gold	Silver	Bronze	Total
1	Jersey	33	31	29	93
2	Isle of Man	29	22	17	68
3	Faroe Islands	22	11	27	60
4	Guernsey	19	37	31	87
5	Saaremaa	16	12	6	34
6	Gotland	13	14	16	43
7	Åland	12	7	16	35
8	Cayman Islands	11	10	9	30
9	Isle of Wight	11	8	15	34
10	Gibraltar*	8	12	9	29
11	Menorca	8	10	13	31
12	Western Isles	4	2	2	8
13	Greenland	2	2	4	8
14	Shetland	2	1	11	14
15	Ynys Môn	2	1	3	6
16	Orkney	1	3	2	6
17	Bermuda	0	6	8	14
18	Hitra	0	2	1	3
19	Sark	0	1	0	1
20	Alderney	0	0	0	0
20	Falkland Islands	0	0	0	0
20	Saint Helena	0	0	0	0
Totals (22 entries)		193	192	219	604
