= Gozo at the Island Games =

- IOC code: GOZ
- National federation: Gozo Island Games Association
- Website: Facebook
- Medals: Gold 1 Silver 4 Bronze 2 Total 7

Gozo has competed once at the Island Games, making their debut in the 2023 Island Games. Gozo was the second island to represent Malta, given that previously Malta had participated twice at the Island Games, namely in the 1985 and 1987 editions.

On 12 August 2024, it was announced that Gozo will also be participating in the 2025 Island Games.

== Gozo Island Games Association ==
The Gozo Island Games Association joined the International Island Games Association in July 2022.

== Medals ==
See also all time medals

Games	Location	Gold	Silver	Bronze	Total
2023	Guernsey	1	2	1	4
2025	Orkney	-	2	1	3
Total		1	4	2	7

== Medalists ==
Medal	Year	Name	Sport	Event	Refs
Gold	2023	Marlon Attard	Shooting	Open Olympic Skeet	
Silver	2023	David Borg	Athletics	Men's 5,000m	
Silver	2023	Lara Calleja	Shooting	Women's Sport Trap	
Silver	2025	Charlton Debono	Athletics	Men's Half Marathon	
Silver	2025	Charlton Debono; Isaac Attard; Matthew Xuereb	Athletics	Men's Half Marathon Team	
Bronze	2023	Lara Calleja	Shooting	Women's English Sporting	
Bronze	2025	Charlton Debono	Athletics	Athletics 10,000m Men	

Medals by sport
Sport	Gold medal	Silver medal	Bronze medal	Total
Shooting	1	1	1	3
Athletics	0	3	1	2
Total	1	4	2	7

== 2023 Island Games ==
Gozo at the 2023 Island Games

in Guernsey 8 July 2023 – 14 July 2023
- Competitors: 39 (36 men and 3 women) in 7 sports and 24 events
- Medals Ranked 16th: Gold 1 Silver 2 Bronze 1 Total 4

=== Competitors ===
The following is the list of number of competitors participating at the Games per sport/discipline.

Sport	Men	Women	Total
Athletics	4	0	4
Cycling	5	1	6
Football	20	0	20
Shooting	2	1	3
Swimming	3	1	4
Table Tennis	1	0	1
Triathlon	1	0	1
Total	36	3	39

=== Events ===
The following is the list of events that Gozo competed in.

Sport	Event	Competitors		
Sport	Event	Men	Women	Total
Athletics	Men's 5,000m	2	0	2
Athletics	Men's 10,000m	2	0	2
Athletics	Men's Half Marathon	3	0	3
Athletics	Men's Half Marathon Team	3	0	3
Cycling	Men's Individual Mountain Bike Cross Country	5	0	5
Cycling	Women's Individual Mountain Bike Cross Country	0	1	1
Cycling	Men's Mountain Bike Cross Country Team	5	0	5
Cycling	Men's Individual Mountain Bike Criterium	5	0	5
Cycling	Women's Individual Mountain Bike Criterium	0	1	1
Cycling	Men's Mountain Bike Criterium Team	5	0	5
Football	Men's Football	20	0	20
Shooting	Open's Olympic Skeet Individual	1	0	1
Shooting	Men's Olympic Skeet Team	1	0	1
Shooting	Men's English Sporting Individual	1	0	1
Shooting	Women's English Sporting Individual	0	1	1
Shooting	Women's Sport Trap Individual	0	1	1
Swimming	Men's 400m Freestyle	2	0	2
Swimming	Men's 800m Freestyle	2	0	2
Swimming	Men's 1500m Freestyle	2	0	2
Swimming	Women's 200m Freestyle	0	1	1
Swimming	Women's 400m Freestyle	0	1	1
Swimming	Women's 800m Freestyle	0	1	1
Table Tennis	Men's Singles	1	0	1
Triathlon	Men's Individuals	1	0	1
Total		17	7	24

=== Medalists' Results ===
The following is the results of the medalists at the Games per sport/discipline.

Sport	Event	Competitor	Position	Result
Athletics	Men's 5,000	David Borg	2	14:59.41
Shooting	Open Olympic Skeet	Marlon Attard	1	52
Shooting	Women's English Sporting	Lara Calleja	3	67
Shooting	Women's Sport Trap	Lara Calleja	2	67

== 2025 Island Games ==
Gozo at the 2025 Island Games

in Orkney 12 July 2025 – 18 July 2025
- Competitors: 51 (31 men and 20 women) in 6 sports and 18 events
- Medals: Gold 0 Silver 2 Bronze 1 Total 3

=== Competitors ===
The following is the list of number of competitors participating at the Games per sport/discipline.

Sport	Men	Women	Total
Athletics	4	1	5
Cycling	2	0	2
Football	20	19	39
Golf	1	0	1
Swimming	1	0	1
Triathlon	3	0	3
Total	31	20	51

=== Events ===
The following is the list of events that Gozo competed in.

Sport	Event	Competitors		
Sport	Event	Men	Women	Total
Athletics	Men's 5,000m	1	0	1
Athletics	Men's 10,000m	2	0	2
Athletics	Women's 10,000m	0	1	1
Athletics	Men's Half Marathon	3	0	3
Athletics	Women's Half Marathon	0	1	1
Athletics	Men's Half Marathon Team	3	0	3
Cycling	Men's Individual Mountain Bike Cross Country	2	0	2
Cycling	Men's Mountain Bike Cross Country Team	2	0	2
Cycling	Men's Individual Mountain Bike Criterium	2	0	2
Cycling	Men's Mountain Bike Criterium Team	2	0	2
Football	Men's Football	20	0	20
Football	Women's Football	0	19	19
Golf	Men's Individual	1	0	1
Swimming	Men's 50m Backstroke	1	0	1
Swimming	Men's 50m Butterfly	1	0	1
Swimming	Men's 50m Freestyle	1	0	1
Triathlon	Men's Individuals	3	0	3
Triathlon	Men's Team	3	0	3
Total		15	3	18

=== Medalists' Results ===
The following is the results of the medalists at the Games per sport/discipline.

Sport	Event	Competitor	Position	Result
Athletics	Men's 10,000	Charlton Debono	3	32:05.30
Athletics	Men's Half Marathon	Charlton Debono	2	1:11:24.00
Athletics	Men's Half Marathon Team	Charlton Debono; Isaac Attard; Matthew Xuereb	2	10
