= Libby Hart (sport shooter) =

British sport shooter (born 2007)

Elizabeth (Libby) Hart
Personal information
- Born: 13 May 2007 (age 19) Jersey
- Education: Jersey College for Girls; University of Surrey

Sport
- Country: Jersey; United Kingdom
- Sport: Shooting
- Events: 10 metre air rifle; 50 metre rifle three positions; 50 metre rifle prone; Fullbore target rifle
- Club: Western Miniature Rifle Club; Jersey Rifle Association
Medal record
Women's shooting
Representing Jersey
Island Games
Gold medal – first place	2023 Island Games	10m Air Rifle
Silver medal – second place	2023 Island Games	10m Air Rifle Team

Elizabeth 'Libby' Hart (born 13 May 2007) is a British sports shooter. In 2023 she became the youngest ever winner of the Channel Islands Championship Crown for Fullbore rifle. In 2023 she also won the 10M Air Rifle event at the 2023 Island Games, her first international competition.

== Education ==
Hart was educated at Jersey College for Girls. As of 2026, she studies mechanical engineering at the University of Surrey.

== Shooting career ==
Hart started shooting in 2019 with her father at Western Miniature Rifle Club, later joining the Combined Cadet Force at Victoria College.

In June 2023, she became the youngest person and first female to win the Channel Islands Championship Crown - a Fullbore target rifle event.

In August 2023, she won the 10 m Air Rifle event at the 2023 Island Games, a discipline she had only started in October 2022.

Hart was named Sportsperson of the Year 2023 at the Jersey Sports Council Awards.

Hart made her international debut for Great Britain at the 2024 Nordic Championships, finishing 17th in the 10m air rifle.

She was selected for the 2025 GB Drew team and earned promotion to X Class at the National Smallbore Rifle Championships, where she was Top Junior and top A-Class female. In November 2025, she was named as a beneficiary of the Jersey Sport Performance Sports Programme.

In January 2026, Hart was selected to the British Shooting Olympic Potential Programme, targeting the 2032 Summer Olympics in Brisbane.
