= Triathlon at the Island Games =

Multi-sports event

Triathlon is an event at the Island Games, the biennial multi-sports event for island nations, territories and dependencies. Men's and Women's triathlons were included in the Games for the first time in the Isle of Man, in 2001. Not every Games has included a triathlon competition. The 2027 games will hold a pool swim sprint distance triathlon due to being unable to hold a sea swim event due to the sea temperature in Faroe it will also be the first time that the bike leg of the island games individual triathlon will be draft legal on road bikes.

Distances
	Swimming	Cycling	Running
Standard (individual)	1500 m	40 km (Non Drafting)	10 km
Relay (each team member)	400 m	6 km (Draft Legal)	1.5 km
Sprint (Faroe 2027)	750m	20 km (Draft Legal)	5 km

== Events ==
Event	IX 2001	X 2003	XI	XII 2007	XIII 2009	XIV 2011	XV 2013	XVI 2015	XVII 2017	XVIII 2019	XIX 2023	XX 2025
Men's	X	X		X	X	X	X	X	X	X	X	X
Women's	X	X		X	X	X	X	X	X	X	X	X
Men's team	X	X		X	X	X	X	X	X	X	X	X
Women's team	X	X		X	X	X	X	X	X	X	X	X
Team Relay											X	

== Top medalists ==
	Gold Medals		Total Medals	
	No:	Team	No:	Team
Men's individual	5	Jersey	12	Jersey
Women's individual	3	Jersey	9	Jersey
Team events	12	Jersey	14	Jersey
Team Relay	1	Jersey	1	Jersey

Men's
Name	Individual Medals			Team Medals			
	Gold	Silver	Bronze	Gold	Silver	Bronze	Total
Paul Clements Jersey	3	0	1	3	0	0	7
Daniel Halksworth Jersey	2	1	0	3	0	0	6
Joshua Lewis Guernsey	2	0	0	0	2	0	4

Women's
Name	Individual Medals			Team Medals			
	Gold	Silver	Bronze	Gold	Silver	Bronze	Total
Melissa Messervy Jersey	2	0	0	2	0	0	4
Joanne Gorrod Jersey	1	1	0	2	0	0	4
Megan Chapple Guernsey	1	1	0	1	1	0	4

== Men's individual ==
Games	Year	Host						
Games	Year	Host	Gold	Time	Silver	Time	Bronze	Time
IX	2001	Isle of Man	Jersey; Paul Clements	2:00:25	Jersey; James Amy	2:01:25	(Isle of Wight) IOW; Chris Volley	2:03:59
X	2003	Guernsey	(Isle of Wight) IOW; Chris Volley	1:57:36	Gibraltar; Christopher Walker	2:00:19	Jersey; Paul Clements	2:01:37
XII	2007	Rhodes	Jersey; Paul Clements	2:01:08	Jersey; Daniel Halksworth	2:03:11	Jersey; Scott Pitcher	2:04:34
XV	2013	Bermuda	Orkney Islands; Bobby Oag	2:00:04	Faroe Islands; Gudmundur Joensen	2:01:17	Shetland Islands; Peter Fenwick	2:01:31
XVI	2015	Jersey	Daniel Halksworth Jersey	1:57:09.84	James Travers Guernsey	2:02:22.49	Tom Perchard Jersey	2:04:43.69
XVII	2017	Gotland	Daniel Haksworth; Jersey	1:45:00.2	Nil Riudavets Victory; Menorca	1:46:46.9	Bobby Oag; Orkney	1:46:59.9
XVIII	2019	Gibraltar	Joshua Lewis; Guernsey	2:03:51	Will Draper; Isle of Man	2:05:22	Oliver Turner; Jersey	2:06:00
XIX	2023	Guernsey	Joshua Lewis; Guernsey	1:52:42	Oliver Turner; Jersey	1:55:08	Will Draper; Isle of Man	1:55:19
XX	2025	Orkney	Thomas Atkinson; Jersey	1:52:47	Albert Askengren Gotland	1:59:20	Bobby Oag; Orkney	2:01:52

== Women's individual ==
Games	Year	Host						
Games	Year	Host	Gold	Time	Silver	Time	Bronze	Time
IX	2001	(Isle of Man) IOM	Jersey; Melissa Messervy	2:18:37	Jersey; Natasha Abels	2:25:38	Jersey; Samantha Kemp	2:27:27
X	2003	Guernsey	Jersey; Melissa Messervy	2:10:49	Guernsey; Gail Merrien	2:16:41	Cayman Islands; Andrea Kilam	2:20:44
XII	2007	Rhodes	Guernsey; Sam Herridge	2:16:04	Guernsey; Gail Merrien	2:19:28	Faroe Islands; Anna Karina Ottosen	2:21:02
XV	2013	Bermuda	(Outer Hebrides) Western Isles; Kerry MacPhee	2:10:52	Shetland Islands; Lynsey Henderson	2:18:57	Bermuda; Laurie Orchard	2:19:39
XVI	2015	Jersey	Faroe Islands; Karina Ottosen	2:16:48.10	Jersey; Joanne Gorrod	2:19:34.60	Jersey; Samantha Lee	2:19:47.95
XVII	2017	Gotland	Jersey; Joanne Gorrod	1:59:43.3	Faroe Islands; Karina Ottosen	2:02:14.5	Jersey; Melissa Messervy-Gross	2:02:35.2
XVIII	2019	Gibraltar	Súsanna Skylv Sørensen; Faroe Islands	2:31:27	Megan Chapple; Guernsey	2:32:56	Lynsey Elliott; Isle of Man	2:36:59
XIX	2023	Guernsey	Megan Chapple; Guernsey	2:15:24	Kimberley Garrett; Jersey	2:19:44	Amy Critchlow; Guernsey	2:22:59
XX	2025	Orkney	Claire Rendall Orkney	2:20:08	Hannah Kennedy Guernsey	2:22:45	Clara Isaac Isle of Man	2:25:43

== Men's team ==
Games	Year	Host						
Games	Year	Host	Gold	Time	Silver	Time	Bronze	Time
IX	2001	Isle of Man	Jersey	6:12:30	Isle of Man	6:32:39	Cayman Islands	6:34:14
X	2003	Guernsey	Jersey	6:14:53	Guernsey	6:26:24	Isle of Man	6:27:25
XII	2007	Rhodes	Jersey	6:08:53	Guernsey	6:23:41	Orkney Islands	6:38:54
XV	2013	Bermuda	Gibraltar	6:20:55	Orkney Islands	6:22:26	Isle of Man	6:29:24
XVI	2015	Jersey	Jersey	6:09:05	Guernsey	6:18:32	Gibraltar	6:23:55
XVII	2017	Gotland	Jersey	5:26:03.10	Guernsey	5:29:04.70	Gibraltar	5:34:35.30
XVIII	2019	Gibraltar	Jersey	6:29:48	Guernsey	6:33:16	Isle of Man	6:42:21
XIX	2023	Guernsey	Jersey	6:02:05	Guernsey	6:04:59	Isle of Man	6:07:02
XX	2025	Orkney	Jersey	6:12:48	Gibraltar	6:30:24	Guernsey	6:40:45

== Women's team ==
Games	Year	Host						
Games	Year	Host	Gold	Time	Silver	Time	Bronze	Time
IX	2001	Isle of Man	Jersey	4:44:15	Cayman Islands	5:02:51		
X	2003	Guernsey	Jersey	4:36:30	Guernsey	4:39:32	Cayman Islands	4:52:23
XII	2007	Rhodes	Guernsey	4:35:32	Faroe Islands	4:42:24	Isle of Man	4:51:38
XV	2013	Bermuda	(Outer Hebrides) Western Isles	4:34:17	Bermuda	4:43:55	Guernsey	4:44:43
XVI	2015	Jersey	Jersey	4:39:23	Isle of Man	4:52:51	Shetland Islands	4:57:42
XVII	2017	Gotland	Jersey	6:12:13.20	Guernsey	6:29:22.60	Shetland	6:54:09.30
XVIII	2019	Gibraltar	Guernsey	7:57:24	Jersey	8:00:19	Shetland	8:30:26
XIX	2023	Guernsey	Guernsey	7:03:47	Jersey	7:29:08	Shetland	7:34:53
XX	2025	Orkney	Guernsey	7:22:25	Shetland	7:35:07		

== Team relay ==
Games	Year	Host						
Games	Year	Host	Gold	Time	Silver	Time	Bronze	Time
XIX	2023	Guernsey	Jersey	01:06:16	Guernsey	01:09:05	Isle of Man	01:09:39
