= Triathlon at the 2023 Island Games =

- Venue: Rocquaine Bay and St Peter Port
- Dates: 9 & 14 July
- Nations: 15

Triathlon, for the 2023 Island Games, was held at Rocquaine Bay, Guernsey on 9 July and St Peter Port, Guernsey on 14 July 2023.

== Medal table ==
* Host nation (Guernsey)

Triathlon Medals
Rank	Nation	Gold	Silver	Bronze	Total
1	Guernsey (GUE)	3	2	1	6
2	Jersey (JEY)	2	3	0	5
3	Isle of Man (IOM)	0	0	3	3
4	Shetland (SHE)	0	0	1	1
Totals (4 entries)		5	5	5	15

== Participating islands ==
- Åland Islands
- Bermuda
- Cayman Islands
- Faroe Islands
- Gibraltar
- Gozo
- Greenland
- Guernsey (Host)
- Isle of Man
- Isle of Wight
- Jersey
- Menorca
- Orkney
- Shetland Islands
- (Anglesey) Ynys Môn

== Results ==
=== Men ===
Swim 1500m, Bike 41km, Run 10km

Event	Gold		Silver		Bronze	
Individual	Joshua Lewis; Guernsey	1:52:42	Oliver Turner; Jersey	1:55:08	Will Draper; Isle of Man	1:55:19
Team	Jersey; Thomas Atkinson; David Holmes; Jack Kennedy; Richard Tanguy; Oliver Turner	6:02:05	Guernsey; Thierry Le Cheminant; Joshua Lewis; David Mosley; Chris Norman; Ove Svejstrup; James Travers	6:04:59	Isle of Man; John Barrett; Will Draper; Chris Hewson; Kristan King; Juan Kinley; Corrin Leeming; Matthew Looker; Charlie Swales	6:07:02

=== Women ===
Swim 1500m, Bike 41km, Run 10km

Event	Gold		Silver		Bronze	
Individual	Megan Chapple; Guernsey	2:15:24	Kimberley Garrett; Jersey	2:19:44	Amy Critchlow; Guernsey	2:22:59
Team	Guernsey; Megan Chapple; Amy Critchlow; Emily Squire; Chloe Truffitt	7:03:47	Jersey; Claire Forbes; Kimberley Garrett; Sam Lee	7:29:08	Shetland; Wendy Hatrick; Lynsey Henderson; Emma Leask; Louise Parr	7:34:53

=== Team relay ===
Each team member - Swim 400m, Bike 6km, Run 1,500m.

Event	Gold		Silver		Bronze	
Team	Jersey 1 Luke Holmes; Siena Stephens; Oliver Turner	01:06:16	Guernsey 1 Megan Chapple; Thierry Le Cheminant; Joshua Lewis	01:09:05	Isle of Man 1 Will Draper; Corrin Leeming; Kiera Prentice	01:09:39
