= Cameron Chalmers =

British sprinter (born 1997)

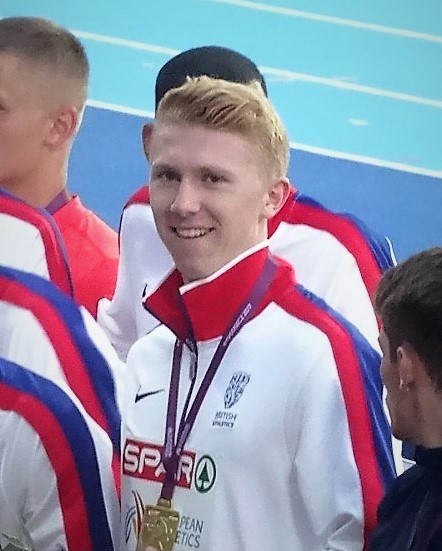
- Chalmers in 2017

Personal information
- Nationality: British
- Born: 6 February 1997 (age 29) Guernsey
- Height: 1.89 m (6 ft 2 in)
- Weight: 80 kg (176 lb)

Sport
- Sport: Track and field
- Event: Sprints
- College team: Bath
- Club: Guernsey
- Coached by: Matthew Elias

Achievements and titles
- Personal bests: 100 m: 10.77 (2018); 400 m: 45.64(2017)
Medal record
Men's athletics
Representing Great Britain
European Championships
Silver medal – second place	2018 Berlin	4 × 400 m relay
European U23 Championships
Gold medal – first place	2017 Bydgoszcz	4 × 400 m relay
Silver medal – second place	2019 Gävle	400 m
Silver medal – second place	2019 Gävle	4 × 400 m relay
British Championships
Silver medal – second place	2019 Birmingham	400 m
Silver medal – second place	2021 Manchester	400 m
Bronze medal – third place	2017 Birmingham	400 m
Bronze medal – third place	2018 Birmingham	400 m
British Indoor Championships
Gold medal – first place	2019 Birmingham	400 m
Silver medal – second place	2016 Sheffield	400 m
Silver medal – second place	2017 Sheffield	400 m
Representing Guernsey
Island Games
Gold medal – first place	2015 Jersey	400 m
Gold medal – first place	2015 Jersey	4 x 400 m relay
Gold medal – first place	2023 Guernsey	4 x 400 m relay
Silver medal – second place	2023 Guernsey	400 m

Cameron Christopher David Chalmers (born 6 February 1997) is a Guernsey born British track and field sprinter who specialises in the 400 metres. The Guernsey record-holder for the 400 metres, he currently competes for both Guernsey and Great Britain.

== Biography ==
=== Early life and career ===
Born in Guernsey, Chalmers was educated at Elizabeth College and began running with the local Guernsey Island Amateur Athletic Club in 2010. Chalmers competed in a variety of running events in 2013 before focusing on 400 m events from 2014 onwards. After leaving school, Chalmers secured a place at the University of Bath, where he would train under Dan Cossins. In 2015, Chalmers made his first junior appearance for Great Britain, competing in the under-20 4 × 400 m event at the Loughborough International. Chalmers won gold medals in both the 400 m and 4 × 400 m events while representing Guernsey at the 2015 Island Games.

In 2016, Chalmers competed at the U20 World Championships in Bydgoszcz, where he set a then personal best of 46.51 seconds in the semifinals; he narrowly missed out on the finals, eventually finishing in 9th. Representing Bath in the 400 m final at the 2017 BUCS Championships, Chalmers won his fourth consecutive BUCS 400 m title. His winning time of 45.71 broke the seventeen-year-old championship record, and set a new Guernsey record. In June later that year, Chalmers improved his own Guernsey record time, setting a new personal best of 45.64 as he won the 400 m final at the U23 England Athletics Championships in Bedford.

=== Senior career ===
Ahead of the 2017 Island Games, Chalmers announced he was pulling out in order to focus on making selection for Great Britain at the 2017 World Championships. In July that year, Chalmers was named in the Great Britain relay squad, representing the team at the 2017 European Team Championships held in Lille, before being called up for the relay squad at the 2017 World Championships. On 10 February 2019, Chalmers won gold at the 2019 British Indoor Athletics Championships to take his first senior British 400 m title. The time was a personal indoor best of 46.26 and saw him qualify for the 2019 European Athletics Indoor Championships. On 27 December 2019, Athletics Weekly ranked Chalmers as the third best 400 m runner in their UK men's merit rankings for 2019.

== Statistics ==
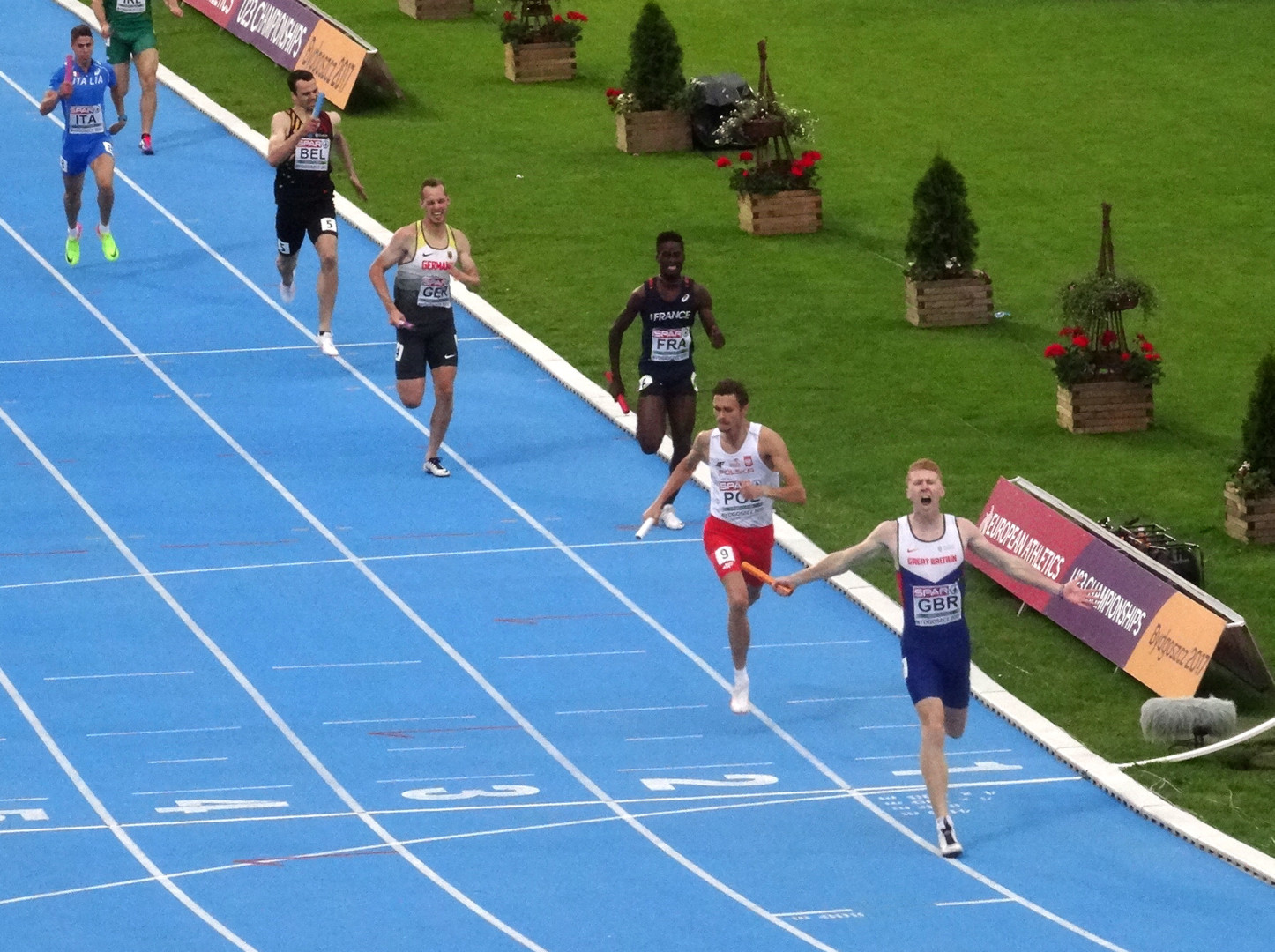
Chalmers celebrating after crossing the line at the 2017 European Athletics U23 Championships.

=== Personal bests ===
Event	Time (seconds)	Event	Venue	Date	Notes
100 metres	10.77	Guernsey Intertrust Challenge Open	Saint Peter Port, Guernsey	31 July 2016	
400 metres	45.64	England Athletics U23 Championships	Beford, England	18 June 2017	NR

=== Seasonal bests ===
Year	100 metres	400 metres
2013	11.87	50.29
2014	—	50.77
2015	—	48.03
2016	10.77	46.51
2017	—	45.64
2018	10.77	45.75
2019	—	45.84

=== International competitions ===
Year	Competition	Venue	Position	Event	Notes
Representing Guernsey
2015	Island Games	St Clement, Jersey	1st	400 m	48.03
2015	Island Games	St Clement, Jersey	1st	4 × 400 m relay	3:16.39
2018	Commonwealth Games	Gold Coast, Australia	13th (sf)	400 m	46.34
Representing Great Britain
2016	World U20 Championships	Bydgoszcz, Poland	9th (sf)	400 m	46.51
2017	European U23 Championships	Bydgoszcz, Poland	4th	400 m	46.29
2017	European U23 Championships	Bydgoszcz, Poland	1st	4 × 400 m relay	3:03.65
2018	European Championships	Berlin, Germany	2nd	4 × 400 m relay	3:01.62 (Note: Did not run the final; time from the heats.)
2019	World Relays	Yokohama, Japan	5th	4 × 400 m relay	3:04.96
2019	European U23 Championships	Gävle, Sweden	2nd	400 m	45.92
2019	European U23 Championships	Gävle, Sweden	2nd	4 × 400 m relay	3:04.59
2019	World Championships	Doha, Qatar	8th (h)	4 × 400 m relay	3:01.96 (Note: Did not finish in the final)
2021	Olympic Games	Tokyo, Japan	14th (h)	4 × 400 m relay	3:03.29

=== National titles ===
- British Indoor Athletics Championships
  - 400 metres: 2019

== Personal life ==
Chalmers' younger brother Alastair Chalmers is also a track and field athlete, specialising in the 400 metres hurdles. Their father Chris works with the Guernsey Athletics Club.
