= Athletics at the 2025 Island Games =

- Dates: 12-18 July 2025
- Host city: Kirkwall, Orkney, Scotland
- Venue: The Pickaquoy Centre
- Level: Senior
- Events: 36

Athletics at the 2025 Island Games took place from 12 to 18 July at The Pickaquoy Centre in Kirkwall, Orkney.

== Medal table ==
* Host nation (Orkney)

Rank	Nation	Gold	Silver	Bronze	Total
1	Jersey	6	6	1	13
2	Isle of Man	6	4	5	15
3	Orkney*	5	4	2	11
4	Guernsey	5	3	7	15
5	Faroe Islands	4	3	5	12
6	Saaremaa	3	1	3	7
7	Menorca	3	1	2	6
8	Ynys Môn	2	2	0	4
9	Western Isles	2	1	2	5
10	Shetland	0	5	3	8
11	Gozo	0	2	1	3
11	Isle of Wight	0	2	1	3
13	Bermuda	0	1	0	1
14	Gotland	0	0	1	1
Totals (14 entries)		36	35	33	104

== Results ==
=== Men ===
Event	Gold		Silver		Bronze	
100 m	Sebastià Pons Triay; Menorca	10.68	Jamie Oldham; Jersey	10.88	Steven Mackay; Jersey	10.94
200 m	Sebastià Pons Triay; Menorca	21.52	Jamie Oldham; Jersey	21.71	Jónas Gunnleivsson Isaksen; Faroe Islands	21.75
400 m	Jónas Gunnleivsson Isaksen; Faroe Islands	48.79	Bobby Laurenson; Shetland	48.91	Dánjal Dahl Ljósheim; Faroe Islands	49.06
800 m	Ted Chamberlain; Jersey	1:51.65	Samuel Perry; Isle of Man	1:51.98	Gian-Luca Robilliard; Guernsey	1:52.73
1,500 m	Ted Chamberlain; Jersey	3:55.53	Christopher Bain; Guernsey	3:56.63	Samuel Perry; Isle of Man	3:57.60
5,000 m	Christopher Bain; Guernsey	15:13.55	Jake Brislane; Bermuda	15:15.38	Julian Gregersen; Faroe Islands	15:15.69
10,000 m	Corrin Leeming; Isle of Man	29:56.11 GR	George Rice; Jersey	32:03.56	Charlton Debono; Gozo	32:05.30
110 m hurdles	Johannes Treiel; Saaremaa	14.84	Evan Campbell; Jersey	15.17	not awarded	
400 m hurdles	Nicolas Ackermann; Guernsey	56.96	not awarded		not awarded	
4 × 100 m relay	Jersey; Evan Campbell; Jamie Oldham; Tyler Johnson; Steven Mackay	41.63	Ynys Môn; Cai Jones; Zachary Price; Ewan Jones; Cameron Jones	42.26	Isle of Man; Sebastien Sgouraditis; Ben Sinclair; Regan Corrin; Daniel Stewart-Clague	42.60
4 × 400 m relay	Jersey; Steven Mackay; Ted Chamberlain; Jamie Oldham; Tyler Johnson	3:17.35	Faroe Islands; Tummas Petur Sjóvará; Andreas Bjarnastein Antoft; Dánjal Dahl Ljósheim; Jónas Gunnleivsson Isaksen	3:22.83	Isle of Man; Regan Corrin; Ryan Corrin; Samuel Perry; Ben Sinclair	3:22.86
Half marathon	Corrin Leeming; Isle of Man	1:07:44	Charlton Debono; Gozo	1:11:24	Julian Gregersen; Faroe Islands	1:12:02
Half marathon team	Faroe Islands; Julian Gregersen; Neli Heldarskarð; Rógvi Kárason	8	Gozo; Isaac Attard; Charlton Debono; Matthew Xuereb	10	Guernsey; Sammy Galpin; James Priest; Ethan Woodhead	14
High jump	Regan Corrin; Isle of Man	1.97	Nicolas Vila Iglesias; Menorca	1.94	Uku Rüütel; Saaremaa	1.94
Long jump	Tórur Mortensen; Faroe Islands	7.40	Regan Corrin; Isle of Man	7.29	Nicolas Vila Iglesias; Menorca	6.77
Triple jump	Nicolas Vila Iglesias; Menorca	14.94	Regan Corrie; Isle of Man	13.75	not awarded	
Shot put	Evan Campbell; Jersey	14.29	Calum Elder; Orkney	14.00	Rauno Liitmäe; Saaremaa	12.87
Javelin throw	Rauno Liitmäe; Saaremaa	60.49	Daniel Dubras; Jersey	57.97	Koit Simso; Saaremaa	50.91

=== Women ===
Event	Gold		Silver		Bronze	
100 m	Taylah Paterson; Orkney	11.90	Katie Dinwoodie; Shetland	12.13	Abi Galpin; Guernsey	12.18
200 m	Taylah Paterson; Orkney	24.22	Ffion Roberts; Ynys Môn	24.66	Katie Dinwoodie; Shetland	24.87
400 m	Ffion Roberts; Ynys Môn	54.12	Emily McArthur; Orkney	56.84	Amelia Hart; Guernsey	57.41
800 m	Darcy Hodgson; Guernsey	2:12.89	Emily McArthur; Orkney	2:13.23	Abbie Stewart; Western Isles	2:14.11
1,500 m	Beca Bown; Ynys Môn	4:34.85	Abbie Stewart; Western Isles	4:35.77	Anna Tait; Orkney	4:36.19
5,000 m	Christa Cain; Isle of Man	16:43.02	Anna Tait; Orkney	16:51.77	Layla Todd; Shetland	17:30.02
10,000 m	Christa Cain; Isle of Man	35:16.83	Amy Kelland; Isle of Wight	37:35.82	Marina Bagur Olives; Menorca	37:36.02
100 m hurdles	Rhiannon Dowinton; Guernsey	14.53	Sophie Hogton; Isle of Wight	15.04	Victoria Hancock; Guernsey	15.56
400 m hurdles	Maria Biskopstø; Faroe Islands	1:01.87	Darcy Hodgson; Guernsey	1:03.27	Aimee Christian; Isle of Man	1:03.89
4 × 100 m relay	Orkney; Sian Smith; Taylah Paterson; Charlotte Hume; Abi Coltherd	47.17	Shetland; Lauren Grains; Katie Dinwoodie; Sophie Grant; Eva Thompson	47.97	Guernsey; Amelia Hart; Matilda Beddow; Rhiannon Dowinton; Emily Pike	48.69
4 × 400 m relay	Orkney; Charlotte Hume; Taylah Paterson; Abi Coltherd; Emily McArthur	3:50.97	Guernsey; Amelia Hart; Darcey Hodgson; Emily Pike; Abi Galpin	3:53.05	Faroe Islands; Elisabet Holm Simonsen; Oddvør Josephsen; Maria Biskopstø; Margit Weihe Fríðmundsdóttir	3:53.59
Half marathon	Christa Cain; Isle of Man	1:17:24	Jessica Troy; Jersey	1:23:37	Mhairi Hall; Western Isles	1:23:58
Half marathon team	Western Isles; Mhairi Hall; Ailyn Mackay; Muriel Macleod	11	Shetland; Mary Rutherford; Michelle Sandison; Diana Tulloch	13	Isle of Man; Dawn Atherton; Christa Cain; Emily Mylchreest	15
High jump	Amy Davis; Orkney	1.61	Teresa Fríðriksdóttir Bláhamar; Faroe Islands	1.61	Hilda Östergren; Gotland	1.56
Long jump	Victoria Hancock; Guernsey	5.35	Abbie Taylor; Shetland	5.32	Eva Thompson; Shetland	5.19
Triple jump	Zara Asante; Jersey	11.61	Georgia Price; Isle of Man	11.53	Victoria Hancock; Guernsey	11.47
Shot put	Linda Kivistik; Saaremaa	10.73	Emma Saar; Saaremaa	10.02	Skyler Brown; Isle of Wight	9.74
Javelin throw	Amie Ringstead; Western Isles	40.46	Sunniva Bogadóttir; Faroe Islands	38.92	Thora Cant; Orkney	37.88
