= Regan Corrin =

British high jumper

- Corrin at the 2026 Commonwealth Games

Personal information
- Born: 16 February 2007 (age 19)

Sport
- Sport: Athletics
- Event: High jump

Achievements and titles
- Personal bests: High jump: 2.19m (Birmingham, 2026); Long jump: 7.57m (Sheffield, 2026)
Medal record
Representing Isle of Man
Island Games
Gold medal – first place	2023 Guernsey	High jump
Gold medal – first place	2025 Orkney	High jump
Silver medal – second place	2025 Orkney	Long jump

Regan Corrin (born 16 February 2007) is a British high jumper and long jumper from the Isle of Man.

== Biography ==
From Port Soderick, and a member of Manx Harriers, Corrin won the gold medal in the high jump at the 2023 Island Games in Guernsey, when he was only 16 years-old, clearing a height of 1.95 metres. Corrin began to train in Loughborough in 2023, making an improvement in his personal best for the high jump.

Corrin set personal best of 2.05 metres for the high jump at the Baker Tilly Isle of Man Championships as a 17 year-old in 2024. Competing in the long jump, he became the first Manx jumper to jump over 7 metres in June 2024. That year, he placed fourth in the high jump at the 2024 European Athletics U18 Championships in Slovakia, cleared a height of 2.05 m to equal his personal best. In September 2024, he broke the Manx under-20 high jump record at the Southport Waterloo Open, clearing 2.13 metres.

The following February, he jumped a new Manx record 7.28 metres at the England Athletics Indoor Track & Field Championships in Sheffield to win the Men's U20 Long Jump event. He retained the high jump title at the 2025 Island Games in Orkney. He also won the silver medal at the Games in the long jump, jumping 7.29 metres, just shy of the person best he set in June 2025, when he jumped 7.31 metres in the long jump at the University of Birmingham Track & Field Festival.

In London on 31 January 2026, Corrin set a new Isle of Man indoor record as he finished second in the under-20 men's long jump at the South of England Indoor Championships with a jump of 7.31m. The following day, he competed in the high jump at the championships, winning with a height of 2.08m. Corrin cleared a personal best height of 2.15 metres to win the England Athletics U20 Indoor Championships in Sheffield in February 2026 to set a new Isle of Man under-20 record. The following day, he increased his Isle of Man long jump record to 7.57 metres. On 15 February, he was runner-up on count-back to Joel Clarke-Khan in the high jump at the 2026 British Indoor Athletics Championships in Birmingham, clearing a new personal best 2.19 metres, on the day before his nineteenth birthday. In May, he placed second to Archie Yeo in the long jump in the National Athletics League opener in Derby, with a jump of 7.54 metres. In June, he placed third in the long jump at the 2026 British Championships with 7.76 metres.

He was named in the Isle of Man squad for the 2026 Commonwealth Games in both the long jump and the high jump. On 27 July, he qualified for the final of the long jump from the heats, with a wind-assisted jump of 7.84 metres, prior to placing tenth overall. He also placed tenth in the high jump at the Games in Glasgow, Scotland.
