= Triathlon at the 2019 Island Games =

- Venue: Eastern Beach
- Dates: 7 July

Triathlon, for the 2019 Island Games, was held at Eastern Beach, Gibraltar on 7 July 2019.

== Medal table ==
Rank	Nation	Gold	Silver	Bronze	Total
1	Guernsey	2	2	0	4
2	Jersey	1	1	1	3
3	Faroe Islands	1	0	0	1
4	Isle of Man	0	1	2	3
5	Shetland	0	0	1	1
Totals (5 entries)		4	4	4	12

== Results ==
=== Men ===
Event	Gold		Silver		Bronze	
Individual	Joshua Lewis; Guernsey	2:03:51	Will Draper; Isle of Man	2:05:22	Oliver Turner; Jersey	2:06:00
Team	Jersey; James Allan; Michael Steens; Richard Tanguy; Nic Thorne; Oliver Turner	6:29:48	Guernsey; Daniel Galpin; Aivis Kergalvis; Joshua Lewis; David Mosley; Josh Thornton; James Travers	6:33:16	Isle of Man; Ryan Downey; Will Draper; Christopher Hewson; Juan Kinley; Andrew Nash; Jonathon Piggin; Nigel Quaye; James Wright	6:42:21

=== Women ===
Event	Gold		Silver		Bronze	
Individual	Súsanna Skylv Sørensen; Faroe Islands	2:31:27	Megan Chapple; Guernsey	2:32:56	Lynsey Elliott; Isle of Man	2:36:59
Team	Guernsey; Meghan Chapple; Amy Cirtchlow; Chantal Green; Emily Squire	7:57:24	Jersey; Louise Bracken-Smith; Kirstie Clutton; Clare Forbes; Joanne Gorrod; Mel Messervy-Gross; Katie Silva	8:00:19	Shetland; Shelley Humphray; Louise Parr; Miriam Veenhuizen	8:30:26
