= Archery at the 2023 Island Games =

- Venue: Port Soif, Guernsey
- Dates: 10–13 July
- Nations: 15

Archery, for the 2023 Island Games, held at the Rovers football club, Port Soif, Guernsey in July 2023.

== Medal table ==
* Host nation (Guernsey)

Rank	Nation	Gold	Silver	Bronze	Total
1	Jersey	5	2	4	11
2	Faroe Islands	4	1	2	7
3	Gotland	3	0	0	3
4	Falkland Islands	1	1	0	2
5	Åland	1	0	1	2
6	Guernsey*	0	4	4	8
7	Isle of Man	0	4	2	6
8	Bermuda	0	1	1	2
9	Orkney	0	1	0	1
Totals (9 entries)		14	14	14	42

== Participating islands ==
- Åland Islands
- Alderney
- Bermuda
- Falkland Islands
- Faroe Islands
- Gotland
- Guernsey (Host)
- Isle of Man
- Isle of Wight
- Jersey
- Menorca
- Orkney
- Sark
- Shetland Islands
- Western Isles

== Results ==
=== Individual recurve ===
Event	Gold		Silver		Bronze	
Men's single WA 1440	Hans Petur Højgaard; Faroe Islands	1202	Bernard Wade III; Bermuda	1193	Daniele Rolfi; Åland	1172
Women's single WA 1440	Rebekka Gannholm; Gotland	1176	Lisa Gray; Guernsey	1145	Mollie Perrett; Jersey	1141
Men's head-to-head knockout	Daniele Rolfi; Åland		William Chater; Falkland Islands		Bernard Wade III; Bermuda	
Women's head-to-head knockout	Rebekka Gannholm; Gotland		Mollie Perrett; Jersey		Chantelle Bearder; Guernsey	

=== Team recurve ===
Event	Gold		Silver		Bronze	
Single WA 1440	Faroe Islands; Hans Bogi Ellefsen; Absalon Hansen; Sólgerð Henriksen; Hans Petur Højgaard; Bárður Magnusson	3361	Guernsey; Chantelle Bearder; Jason Clarke; Jess Clarke; Jon Davey; Lisa Gray; Jason Le Page; Morgan Taylor; Paul Taylor	3242	Jersey; Frederick Crosby; Peter Gavey; Summer Glendewar; Ian Hamon; Paula Hindley; Mollie Perrett; Tony Vardon	3193
Head-to-head knockout	Falkland Islands; William Chater; Kirsty Lewis; Mark Lewis		Guernsey; Chantelle Bearder; Lisa Gray; Jason Le Page		Faroe Islands; Hans Bogi Ellefsen; Sólgerð Henriksen; Hans Petur Højgaard	
Mixed head-to-head knockout	Gotland; Jan-Åke Andersson; Rebekka Gannholm		Faroe Islands; Hans Bogi Ellefsen; Absalon Hansen; Sólgerð Henriksen; Hans Petur Højgaard; Bárður Magnusson		Jersey; Frederick Crosby; Peter Gavey; Summer Glendewar; Ian Hamon; Paula Hindley; Mollie Perrett; Tony Vardon	

=== Individual compound ===
Event	Gold		Silver		Bronze	
Men's single WA 1440	Jóannes Poulsen; Faroe Islands	1339	Stewart Stanger; Orkney	1330	Rhys Moore; Isle of Man	1325
Women's single WA 1440	Lucy O'Sullivan; Jersey	1329	Aalin George; Isle of Man	1286	Zoe Gray; Guernsey	1257
Men's head-to-head knockout	Nikkel Petersen; Faroe Islands		Rhys Moore; Isle of Man		Francisco Rocha; Jersey	
Women's head-to-head knockout	Lucy O'Sullivan; Jersey		Angela Perrett; Jersey		Zoe Gray; Guernsey	

=== Team compound ===
Event	Gold		Silver		Bronze	
Single WA 1440	Jersey; Hannah Bridle; David Davies; Lloyd Glendewar; Lucy O'Sullivan; Angela Perrett; Heath Perrett; Francisco Rocha	3954	Isle of Man; Aalin George; Joy Gough; David Moore; Ethan Moore; Rhys Moore	3867	Guernsey; Ellen Bonner; Mike Burrows; Oliver Coupe; Zoe Gray; Kieran Kelly; Mike Marquand; Demelza Newsom; Gen Witham	3838
Head-to-head knockout	Jersey; Lloyd Glendewar; Lucy O'Sullivan; Francisco Rocha		Isle of Man; Aalin George; David Moore; Rhys Moore		Faroe Islands; Nikkel Petersen; Jóannes Poulsen; Helena Við Misá	
Mixed head-to-head knockout	Jersey; Hannah Bridle; David Davies; Lloyd Glendewar; Lucy O'Sullivan; Angela Perrett; Heath Perrett; Francisco Rocha		Guernsey; Ellen Bonner; Mike Burrows; Oliver Coupe; Zoe Gray; Kieran Kelly; Mike Marquand; Demelza Newsom; Gen Witham		Isle of Man; Aalin George; Joy Gough; David Moore; Ethan Moore; Rhys Moore	
