= Swimming at the 2023 Island Games =

International athletics championship event

- Venue: Beau Sejour
- Dates: 10–13 July
- Nations: 18

Swimming, for the 2023 Island Games, held at Beau Sejour, Guernsey in July 2023. The events were held in a short course (25 m) pool.

== Medal table ==
* Host nation (Guernsey)

Rank	Nation	Gold	Silver	Bronze	Total
1	Jersey (JEY)	15	12	12	39
2	Guernsey (GUE)	10	12	10	32
3	Isle of Man (IOM)	9	4	2	15
4	Cayman Islands (CAY)	5	3	6	14
5	Faroe Islands (FRO)	4	11	11	26
6	Isle of Wight (IOW)	1	1	1	3
7	Gibraltar (GIB)	1	0	1	2
8	Shetland (SHE)	0	1	1	2
9	Gotland	0	1	0	1
10	Åland (ALA)	0	0	1	1
Totals (10 entries)		45	45	45	135

== Results ==
=== Men ===
Event	Gold		Silver		Bronze	
50 m freestyle	Joel Watterson; Isle of Man	22.93	George Storey; Jersey	23.30	Oliver Brehaut; Jersey	23.60
100 m freestyle	Joel Watterson; Isle of Man	50.01	Oliver Brehaut; Jersey	50.45	Bartal Erlingsson Eidesgaard; Faroe Islands	51.09
200 m freestyle	Peter Allen; Isle of Man	1:51.89	Bartal Erlingsson Eidesgaard; Faroe Islands	1:52.52	Matthew Deffains; Jersey	1:53.32
400 m freestyle	Isaac Dodds; Jersey	3:57.01	Matthew Deffains; Jersey	3:59.78	Líggjas Joensen; Faroe Islands	4:00.24
800 m freestyle	Isaac Dodds; Jersey	8:13.03	Líggjas Joensen; Faroe Islands	8:17.63	Heini Mohr Askham; Faroe Islands	8:21.19
1500 m freestyle	Líggjas Joensen; Faroe Islands	15:54.63	Heini Mohr Askham; Faroe Islands	15:57.45	Will Sellars; Cayman Islands	16:11.60
50 m backstroke	Robert Jones; Jersey	26.26	Thomas Hollingsworth; Guernsey	26.29	Joel Watterson; Isle of Man	26.34
100 m backstroke	Robert Jones; Jersey	55.87	Thomas Hollingsworth; Guernsey	56.81	Will Sellars; Cayman Islands	57.69
200 m backstroke	Will Sellars; Cayman Islands	2:03.92	Thomas Hollingsworth; Guernsey	2:05.51	Luke Fleming; Jersey	2:09.22
50 m breaststroke	Charlie-Joe Hallett; Guernsey	28.11	Ronny Hallett; Guernsey	28.17	Róland Toftum; Faroe Islands	29.05
100 m breaststroke	Ronny Hallett; Guernsey	1:01.70	Charlie-Joe Hallett; Guernsey	1:02.29	Bartal Erlingsson Eidesgaard; Faroe Islands	1:03.78
200 m breaststroke	Ronny Hallett; Guernsey	2:17.89	Elias Lyth; Gotland	2:18.27	Bartal Erlingsson Eidesgaard; Faroe Islands	2:19.49
50 m butterfly	Joel Watterson; Isle of Man	24.39	Peter Allen; Isle of Man	24.93	Robert Jones; Jersey	25.39
100 m butterfly	Peter Allen; Isle of Man	55.09	Robert Jones; Jersey	55.40	Jake Bailey; Cayman Islands	56.49
200 m butterfly	Isaac Dodds; Jersey	1:59.94	Peter Allen; Isle of Man	2:01.94	Isak Dag Brisenfeldt; Faroe Islands	2:03.70
100 m individual medley	Robert Jones; Jersey	56.59	Charlie-Joe Hallett; Guernsey	57.46	Ronny Hallett; Guernsey	57.66
200 m individual medley	Isaac Dodds; Jersey	2:02.04	Robert Jones; Jersey	2:02.88	Charlie-Joe Hallett; Guernsey	2:07.94
400 m individual medley	Isaac Dodds; Jersey	4:20.07	Thomas Deffains; Jersey	4:28.04	Will Sellars; Cayman Islands	4:33.40
4 × 50 m freestyle relay	Jersey; Oliver Brehaut; Isaac Dodds; Robert Jones; George Storey; Matthew Deffains ^{[a]} Thomas Deffains ^{[a]}	1:32.96	Isle of Man; Peter Allen; Benjamin Kebbell; Carrick Thompson; Joel Watterson; Alexander Turnbull ^{[a]}	1:33.09	Guernsey; Jonathan Beck; Owain Edwards; Charlie-Joe Hallett; Ronny Hallett; Joshua Dunning ^{[a]} Samuel Lowe ^{[a]}	1:35.20
4 × 100 m freestyle relay	Isle of Man; Peter Allen; Benjamin Kebbell; Carrick Thompson; Joel Watterson; Magnus Kelly ^{[a]} Alexander Turnbull ^{[a]}	3:24.19	Jersey; Oliver Brehaut; Matthew Deffains; Isaac Dodds; Robert Jones; Thomas Deffains ^{[a]} Joseph Swart ^{[a]}	3:25.24	Faroe Islands; Heini Mohr Askham; Isak Dag Brisenfeldt; Bartal Erlingsson Eidesgaard; Líggjas Joensen	3:27.28
4 × 50 m medley relay	Isle of Man; Peter Allen; Benjamin Kebbell; Alexander Turnbull; Joel Watterson; Carrick Thompson ^{[a]}	1:42.82	Jersey; Oliver Brehaut; Isaac Dodds; Robert Jones; George Storey; Matthew Deffains ^{[a]} Thomas Deffains ^{[a]}	1:43.08	Guernsey; Jonathan Beck; Charlie-Joe Hallett; Ronny Hallett; Thomas Hollingsworth; Owain Edwards ^{[a]} Samuel Lowe ^{[a]}	1:43.80
4 × 100 m medley relay	Jersey; Oliver Brehaut; Thomas Deffains; Isaac Dodds; Robert Jones; Matthew Deffains ^{[a]} Joseph Swart ^{[a]}	3:45.30	Guernsey; Jonathan Beck; Charlie-Joe Hallett; Ronny Hallett; Thomas Hollingsworth; Owain Edwards ^{[a]} Samuel Lowe ^{[a]}	3:46.91	Isle of Man; Peter Allen; Benjamin Kebbell; Alexander Turnbull; Joel Watterson; Carrick Thompson ^{[a]}	3:47.29

=== Women ===
Event	Gold		Silver		Bronze	
50 m freestyle	Alison Jackson; Cayman Islands	26.07	Hannah Jones; Guernsey	26.69	Alisa Bech Vestergård; Faroe Islands	26.70
100 m freestyle	Gemma Atherley; Jersey	57.35	Alison Jackson; Cayman Islands	57.51	Alisa Bech Vestergård; Faroe Islands	57.83
200 m freestyle	Gemma Atherley; Jersey	2:02.79	Alisa Bech Vestergård; Faroe Islands	2:04.29	Alison Jackson; Cayman Islands	2:05.46
400 m freestyle	Kyra Rabess; Cayman Islands	4:15.78 GR	Eyðrið Mortensen; Faroe Islands	4:20.41	Orla Rabey; Guernsey	4:21.86
800 m freestyle	Kyra Rabess; Cayman Islands	8:46.33 GR	Eyðrið Mortensen; Faroe Islands	9:00.04	Clara Ginnis; Jersey	9:05.84
1500 m freestyle	Kyra Rabess; Cayman Islands	17:01.45	Eyðrið Mortensen; Faroe Islands	17:18.94	Clara Ginnis; Jersey	17:25.31
50 m backstroke	Elisabeth Erlendsdóttir; Faroe Islands	28.49 GR, NR	Tatiana Tostevin; Guernsey	28.83	Gemma Atherley; Jersey	29.07
100 m backstroke	Elisabeth Erlendsdóttir; Faroe Islands	1:01.07 GR	Gemma Atherley; Jersey	1:01.65	Tatiana Tostevin; Guernsey	1:02.39
200 m backstroke	Elisabeth Erlendsdóttir; Faroe Islands	2:12.38	Gemma Atherley; Jersey	2:13.98	Tatiana Tostevin; Guernsey	2:15.08
50 m breaststroke	Laura Kinley; Isle of Man	32.13	Laura Le Cras; Guernsey	32.22	Jasmin Smith; Shetland	32.74
100 m breaststroke	Laura Kinley; Isle of Man	1:09.50	Jasmin Smith; Shetland	1:12.04	Asia Kent; Gibraltar	1:12.48
200 m breaststroke	Asia Kent; Gibraltar	2:34.30	Lea Osberg Højsted; Faroe Islands	2:37.24	Grace Poynter; Isle of Wight	2:37.72
50 m butterfly	Orla Rabey; Guernsey	28.00	Molly Staples; Guernsey	28.86	Ellen Woivalin; Åland	28.91
100 m butterfly	Orla Rabey; Guernsey	1:01.16	Gemma Atherley; Jersey	1:02.72	Siena Stephens; Jersey	1:04.07
200 m butterfly	Orla Rabey; Guernsey	2:16.26	Jóhanna Ólavsdóttir; Faroe Islands	2:22.09	Clara Ginnis; Jersey	2:23.71
100 m individual medley	Abigail Lacey; Isle of Wight	1:05.09	Laura Kinley; Isle of Man	1:05.41	Laura Le Cras; Guernsey	1:05.74
200 m individual medley	Megan Hansford; Jersey	2:20.98	Abigail Lacey; Isle of Wight	2:21.29	Oriana Wheeler; Guernsey	2:21.97
400 m individual medley	Oriana Wheeler; Guernsey	4:54.94	Clara Ginnis; Jersey	4:58.55	Eyðrið Mortensen; Faroe Islands	5:00.96
4 × 50 m freestyle relay	Guernsey; Hannah Jones; Laura Le Cras; Orla Rabey; Tatiana Tostevin; Ailish Rabey ^{[a]} Molly Staples ^{[a]}	1:44.92 GR	Cayman Islands; Veronika Fankina; Alison Jackson; Sarah Jackson; Kyra Rabess	1:47.07	Jersey; Gemma Atherley; Megan Hansford; Elizabeth Powell; Siena Stephens; Alana Woodhall ^{[a]}	1:47.31
4 × 100 m freestyle relay	Jersey; Gemma Atherley; Megan Hansford; Siena Stephens; Alana Woodhall; Clara Ginnis ^{[a]} Elizabeth Powell ^{[a]}	3:51.19	Cayman Islands; Veronika Fankina; Alison Jackson; Sarah Jackson; Kyra Rabess	3:52.20	Guernsey; Laura Le Cras; Ailish Rabey; Orla Rabey; Tatiana Tostevin; Hannah Jones ^{[a]} Molly Staples ^{[a]}	3:52.64
4 × 50 m medley relay	Guernsey; Hannah Jones; Laura Le Cras; Orla Rabey; Tatiana Tostevin; Ailish Rabey ^{[a]} Molly Staples ^{[a]}	1:54.11 GR	Faroe Islands; Elisabeth Erlendsdóttir; Lea Osberg Højsted; Jóhanna Ólavsdóttir; Alisa Bech Vestergård; Eyðrið Mortensen ^{[a]}	1:58.34	Jersey; Gemma Atherley; Erin Goodbody; Megan Hansford; Siena Stephens; Alana Woodhall ^{[a]}	1:59.16
4 × 100 m medley relay	Guernsey; Laura Le Cras; Ailish Rabey; Orla Rabey; Tatiana Tostevin; Molly Staples ^{[a]} Oriana Wheeler ^{[a]}	4:14.30	Faroe Islands; Elisabeth Erlendsdóttir; Lea Osberg Højsted; Jóhanna Ólavsdóttir; Alisa Bech Vestergård; Eyðrið Mortensen ^{[a]}	4:18.71	Jersey; Gemma Atherley; Erin Goodbody; Megan Hansford; Alana Woodhall; Clara Ginnis ^{[a]}	4:18.76

=== Mixed ===
Event	Gold		Silver		Bronze	
4 × 50 m freestyle relay	Jersey; Gemma Atherley; Megan Hansford; Robert Jones; George Storey; Oliver Brehaut ^{[a]} Elizabeth Powell ^{[a]}	1:38.30	Guernsey; Charlie-Joe Hallett; Ronny Hallett; Hannah Jones; Orla Rabey; Jonathan Beck ^{[a]} Tatiana Tostevin ^{[a]}	1:38.47	Cayman Islands; Jake Bailey; Thomas Ferguson; Alison Jackson; Kyra Rabess	1:38.67

^{a} Swimmers who participated only in the heats and received medals.
