= Table tennis at the 2023 Island Games =

- Venue: Guernsey Table Tennis Centre
- Dates: 9–14 July
- Competitors: 49 men and 38 women from 15 nations

Table tennis, for the 2023 Island Games, held at the Guernsey Table Tennis Centre, Guernsey in July 2023.

== Medal table ==
* Host nation (Guernsey)

| Rank | Nation | Gold | Silver | Bronze | Total |
|---|---|---|---|---|---|
| 1 | Jersey | 3 | 2 | 2 | 7 |
| 2 | Guernsey* | 2 | 1 | 2 | 5 |
| 3 | Gotland | 1 | 2 | 2 | 5 |
| 4 | Åland | 0 | 1 | 1 | 2 |
| 5 | Greenland | 0 | 0 | 3 | 3 |
| 6 | Isle of Man | 0 | 0 | 1 | 1 |
| 6 | Isle of Wight | 0 | 0 | 1 | 1 |
| Totals (7 entries) | | 6 | 6 | 12 | 24 |

== Participating islands ==
- Åland Islands
- Alderney
- Cayman Islands
- Falkland Islands
- Faroe Islands
- Gibraltar
- Gotland
- Gozo
- Greenland
- Guernsey (Host)
- Isle of Man
- Isle of Wight
- Jersey
- Menorca
- Shetland Islands

== Results ==
| Event | Gold | Silver | Bronze |
|---|---|---|---|
| Men's singles | Max Hedbom; Gotland | Jordan Wykes; Jersey | Luc Miller; Jersey |
| Men's singles | Max Hedbom; Gotland | Jordan Wykes; Jersey | Ivik Nielsen; Greenland |
| Women's singles | Hannah Silcock; Jersey | Marina Donner; Åland | Alice Edwards; Guernsey |
| Women's singles | Hannah Silcock; Jersey | Marina Donner; Åland | Katherine Vinas; Isle of Man |
| Men's doubles | Jersey; Luc Miller; Jordan Wykes | Gotland; Jonas Berglund; Max Hedbom | Greenland; Aqqalu Nielsen; Ivik Nielsen |
| Men's doubles | Jersey; Luc Miller; Jordan Wykes | Gotland; Jonas Berglund; Max Hedbom | Guernsey; Garry Dodd; Benjamin Foss |
| Women's doubles | Guernsey; Alice Edwards; Dawn Morgan | Jersey; Hannah Silcock; Kathryn Silcock | Gotland; Evelina Carlsson; Elin Schwartz |
| Women's doubles | Guernsey; Alice Edwards; Dawn Morgan | Jersey; Hannah Silcock; Kathryn Silcock | Greenland; Karlinannguaq Lundblad; Juliane Schmidt |
| Mixed doubles | Guernsey; Garry Dodd; Alice Edwards | Gotland; Evelina Carlsson; Max Hedbom | Åland Islands; Marina Donner; Johan Pettersson |
| Mixed doubles | Guernsey; Garry Dodd; Alice Edwards | Gotland; Evelina Carlsson; Max Hedbom | Jersey; Hannah Silcock; Jordan Wykes |
| Team | Jersey; Luc Miller; Leon Pierre; Hannah Silcock; Kathryn Silcock; Alfie Sutherland; Jordan Wykes | Guernsey; Charlotte Casey; Garry Dodd; Alice Edwards; Benjamin Foss; Dawn Morgan; Joshua Stacey; Lawrence Stacey; Shelby Timms | Gotland; Jonas Berglund; Evelina Carlsson; Betty Engström; Max Hedbom; Stefan Paulsson; Elin Schwartz |
| Team | Jersey; Luc Miller; Leon Pierre; Hannah Silcock; Kathryn Silcock; Alfie Sutherland; Jordan Wykes | Guernsey; Charlotte Casey; Garry Dodd; Alice Edwards; Benjamin Foss; Dawn Morgan; Joshua Stacey; Lawrence Stacey; Shelby Timms | Isle of Wight; Daniel Burns; George Downing; Temeesha Hobbs; Hugh Idle; Anna Joyce; Scott Lawson; Elaine Mills; Patricia Thorley |
