= Athletics at the 2023 Island Games =

- Dates: 9–14 July
- Venue: Footes Lane
- Level: Senior
- Events: 41
- Participation: 20 nations

This is a list of athletics results at the 2023 Island Games, held at Footes Lane, Guernsey in July 2023.

== Medal table ==
* Host nation (Guernsey)

| Rank | Nation | Gold | Silver | Bronze | Total |
|---|---|---|---|---|---|
| 1 | Guernsey* | 8 | 8 | 6 | 22 |
| 2 | Saaremaa | 7 | 6 | 3 | 16 |
| 3 | Isle of Man | 7 | 3 | 5 | 15 |
| 4 | Jersey | 5 | 6 | 7 | 18 |
| 5 | Ynys Môn | 5 | 4 | 2 | 11 |
| 6 | Faroe Islands | 4 | 5 | 6 | 15 |
| 7 | Isle of Wight | 3 | 3 | 0 | 6 |
| 8 | Menorca | 1 | 2 | 2 | 5 |
| 9 | Åland | 1 | 0 | 0 | 1 |
| 10 | Shetland | 0 | 2 | 2 | 4 |
| 11 | Western Isles | 0 | 1 | 1 | 2 |
| 12 | Gozo | 0 | 1 | 0 | 1 |
| 13 | Gibraltar | 0 | 0 | 3 | 3 |
| 14 | Cayman Islands | 0 | 0 | 1 | 1 |
| 14 | Gotland | 0 | 0 | 1 | 1 |
| 14 | Orkney | 0 | 0 | 1 | 1 |
| Totals (16 entries) | | 41 | 41 | 40 | 122 |

== Results ==
=== Men ===
| Event | Gold | | Silver | | Bronze | |
|---|---|---|---|---|---|---|
| 100 m | Eiri Jógvansson Glerfoss; Faroe Islands | 10.58 | Joe Chadwick; Guernsey | 10.70 | Zachary Price; Ynys Môn | 10.75 |
| 200 m | Jónas Gunnleivsson Isaksen; Faroe Islands | NA | Jamie Oldham; Jersey | NA | Jessy Franco; Gibraltar | NA |
| 400 m | Jónas Gunnleivsson Isaksen; Faroe Islands | 46.02 GR | Cameron Chalmers; Guernsey | 46.33 | Peter Curtis; Guernsey | 47.82 |
| 800 m | Iolo Hughes; Ynys Môn | 1:52.15 | Seumas MacKay; Shetland | 1:54.27 | Xavi Cubas Torras; Menorca | 1:55.07 |
| 1500 m | Iolo Hughes; Ynys Môn | 3:52.25 | Seumas MacKay; Shetland | 3:53.79 | Samuel Maher; Jersey | 3:55.33 |
| 5000 m | Osian Perrin; Ynys Môn | 14:11.85 GR | David Borg; Gozo | 14:59.41 | Samuel Maher; Jersey | 14:59.61 |
| 10000 m | Kaur Kivistik; Saaremaa | 31:10.50 | Corrin Leeming; Isle of Man | 31:10.79 | Alan Corlett; Isle of Man | 31:12.31 |
| 110 m hurdles | Evan Campbell; Jersey | 15.09 | Johannes Treiel; Saaremaa | 15.21 | Peter Curtis; Guernsey | 15.40 |
| 400 m hurdles | Alastair Chalmers; Guernsey | 49.83 GR | Peter Curtis; Guernsey | 51.70 | Will Brown; Jersey | 56.64 |
| 3000 m steeplechase | Kaur Kivistik; Saaremaa | 9:48.83 | Daniel Eckersley; Isle of Wight | 9:49.10 | Ben Sergeant; Ynys Môn | 10:11.48 |
| 4 × 100 m relay | Jersey; Tyler Johnson; Aidan Loane; Steven Mackay; Jamie Oldham | 41.94 | Ynys Môn; Cai Jones; Cameron Jones; Ewan Jones; Zachary Price | 42.69 | Isle of Man; Daniel Clague; Regan Corrin; Ben Sinclair; Nathan Teece | 43.22 |
| 4 × 400 m relay | Guernsey; Alastair Chalmers; Cameron Chalmers; Peter Curtis; Josh Duke | 3:11.95 GR | Faroe Islands; Jónas Gunnleivsson Isaksen; Leon Johannesen; Dánjal Dahl Ljósheim; Tummas Petur Sjóvará | 3:18.31 | Jersey; Matthew Brown; Tyler Johnson; Jamie Oldham; Will Brown | 3:19.78 |
| Half-marathon | Corrin Leeming; Isle of Man | 1:08:16 | Lewis MacAlpine; Western Isles | 1:08:57 | George Rice; Jersey | 1:09:00 |
| Half-marathon team | Isle of Man; Alan Corlett; Samuel Jones; Corrin Leeming | 5 | Guernsey; Stephen Dawes; Sammy Galpin; James Priest | 12 | Gibraltar; Harvey Dixon; Benjamin Reeves; Arnold Rogers | 15 |
| High jump | Regan Corrin; Isle of Man | 1.95 m | James Margrave; Isle of Man | 1.90 m | Rauno Liitmäe; Saaremaa | 1.90 m |
| Long jump | Eiri Jógvansson Glerfoss; Faroe Islands | 7.12 m | Nicolas Vila Iglesias; Menorca | 6.87 m | Johannes Treiel; Saaremaa | 6.71 m |
| Triple jump | Nicolas Vila Iglesias; Menorca | 14.55 m | Miso Buha; Faroe Islands | 13.43 m | Tórur Mortensen; Faroe Islands | 13.40 m |
| Shot put | Genro Paas; Saaremaa | 14.82 m | Patrick Harris; Ynys Môn | 14.75 m | Evan Campbell; Jersey | 14.02 m |
| Discus throw | Nicholas Percy; Isle of Wight | 58.33 m GR | Zane Duquemin; Jersey | 56.23 m | Gevin Paas; Saaremaa | 49.75 m |
| Hammer throw | Andy Frost; Isle of Wight | 55.12 m | Genro Paas; Saaremaa | 53.93 m | not awarded | |
| Javelin throw | Joe Harris; Isle of Man | 68.95 m | Rauno Liitmäe; Saaremaa | 60.37 m | James Bougourd; Guernsey | 53.79 m |

=== Women ===
| Event | Gold | | Silver | | Bronze | |
|---|---|---|---|---|---|---|
| 100 m | Sara Wiss; Åland | 11.86 GR | Abi Galpin; Guernsey | 11.89 | Katie Dinwoodie; Shetland | 12.16 |
| 200 m | Abi Galpin; Guernsey | 24.02 | Ffion Roberts; Ynys Môn | 24.54 | Katie Dinwoodie; Shetland | 24.74 |
| 400 m | Ffion Roberts; Ynys Môn | 55.20 | Sophie Porter; Guernsey | 56.43 | Rebecca Toll; Guernsey | 57.19 |
| 800 m | Cari Hughes; Ynys Môn | 2:15.74 | Darcey Hodgson; Guernsey | 2:16.23 | Rebekka Fuglø Poulsen; Faroe Islands | 2:17.73 |
| 1500 m | Rachael Franklin; Isle of Man | 4:20.42 GR | Cari Hughes; Ynys Môn | 4:21.28 | Marina Bagur Olives; Menorca | 4:33.37 |
| 5000 m | Rachael Franklin; Isle of Man | 16:05.80 GR | Marina Bagur Olives; Menorca | 16:38.49 | Nicole Petit; Guernsey | 18:11.04 |
| 10000 m | Sarah Roe; Guernsey | 36:56.01 | Amy Kelland; Isle of Wight | 37:13.77 | Aly Kemp; Orkney | 37:26.13 |
| 100 m hurdles | Rhiannon Dowinton; Guernsey | 15.11 | Lucy Woodward; Jersey | 15.82 | Victoria Hancock; Guernsey | 16.06 |
| 400 m hurdles | Olivia Allbut; Jersey | 1:01.40 | Maria Biskopstø; Faroe Islands | 1:03.39 | Aimee Christian; Isle of Man | 1:09.41 |
| 4 × 100 m relay | Guernsey; Tilly Beddow; Abi Galpin; Emily Pike; Rebecca Toll | 48.60 | Jersey; Olivia Allbut; Lucy Cohu; Danielle Wilkinson; Lucy Woodward | 48.67 | Isle of Man; Andrea Ecolango; Lydia Morris; Meghan Pilley; Carla Teece | 49.10 |
| 4 × 400 m relay | Guernsey; Abi Galpin; Hannah Lesbirel; Sophie Porter; Rebecca Toll | 3:49.66 GR | Jersey; Olivia Allbut; Lucci Baker; Yasmin Lookess; Lucy Woodward | 3:52.76 | Faroe Islands; Maria Biskopstø; Margit Weihe Fríðmundsdóttir; Oddvør Josephsen; Rebekka Fuglø Poulsen | 3:53.64 |
| Half-marathon | Rachael Franklin; Isle of Man | 1:22:15 | Charlie Metcalfe; Isle of Wight | 1:22:58 | Kim Baglietto; Gibraltar | 1:23:41 |
| Half-marathon team | Isle of Wight; Charlie Metcalfe; Holly Newton; Carly Scoble | 7 | Isle of Man; Rachael Franklin; Rebekah Pate | 16 | Western Isles; Mhairi Hall; Muriel Macleod | 18 |
| High jump | Linda Kivistik; Saaremaa | 1.68 m | Teele Treiel; Saaremaa | 1.68 m | Teresa Fríðriksdóttir Bláhamar; Faroe Islands | 1.60 m |
| Long jump | Victoria Hancock; Guernsey | 5.39 m | Katie Le Rougetel; Jersey | 5.38 m | Ashantae Graham; Cayman Islands | 5.36 m |
| Triple jump | Lucy Woodward; Jersey | 11.01 m | Bára Jógvansdóttir Glerfoss; Faroe Islands | 10.97 m | Hilda Östergren; Gotland | 10.91 m |
| Shot put | Linda Kivistik; Saaremaa | 12.55 m | Airike Kapp; Saaremaa | 11.75 m | Lýdia Poula Simonsen; Faroe Islands | 11.14 m |
| Discus throw | Shadine Duquemin; Jersey | 49.34 m | Airike Kapp; Saaremaa | 41.55 m | Tazmin Fayle; Isle of Man | 38.44 m |
| Hammer throw | Airike Kapp; Saaremaa | 44.96 m | Anastasia Banbury; Guernsey | 43.96 m | Guðrið Petersen; Faroe Islands | 42.03 m |
| Javelin throw | Linda Kivistik; Saaremaa | 45.46 m | Sunniva Bogadóttir; Faroe Islands | 35.97 m | Lucy Woodward; Jersey | 35.50 m |
