= Cycling at the 2023 Island Games =

- Venue: various, Guernsey
- Dates: 10–14 July
- Nations: 17

Cycling, for the 2023 Island Games, held in various locations around Guernsey in July 2023.

== Medal table ==
* Host nation (Guernsey)

Rank	Nation	Gold	Silver	Bronze	Total
1	Guernsey	8	8	2	18
2	Jersey	3	4	6	13
3	Saaremaa	2	2	0	4
4	Gibraltar	2	1	2	5
5	Isle of Wight	2	0	1	3
5	Menorca	2	0	1	3
7	Isle of Man	1	2	3	6
8	Western Isles	0	2	0	2
9	Ynys Môn	0	0	1	1
Totals (9 entries)		20	19	16	55

== Participating islands ==
- Åland Islands
- Cayman Islands
- Falkland Islands
- Faroe Islands
- Gibraltar
- Gotland
- Gozo
- Guernsey (Host)
- Isle of Man
- Isle of Wight
- Jersey
- Menorca
- Orkney
- Saaremaa
- Shetland Islands
- Western Isles
- (Anglesey) Ynys Môn

== Medalists ==
=== Mountain biking ===
Men

Event	Gold		Silver		Bronze	
Cross-country	Rhys Hidrio; Jersey	1:22:00	James Roe; Guernsey	1:22:39	Bradley Vaudin; Guernsey	1:24:32
Criterium	Rhys Hidrio; Jersey	42:15.72	James Roe; Guernsey	42:16.40	Bradley Vaudin; Guernsey	42:18.79
Team cross-country	Jersey; Liam Cadoret; James Dilks; Charles Hart; Rhys Hidrio; James Patterson	14	Guernsey; Andrew Colver; John Mapley; James Roe; Mike Serafin; Bradley Vaudin	14	Isle of Man; Elliot Baxter; Owen Collins; Eric Kelly; Alex Rockwell; Ross Thorley	32
Team criterium	Guernsey; Andrew Colver; John Mapley; James Roe; Mike Serafin; Bradley Vaudin	5	Jersey; Liam Cadoret; James Dilks; Charles Hart; Rhys Hidrio; James Patterson	9	Isle of Man; Elliot Baxter; Owen Collins; Eric Kelly; Alex Rockwell; Ross Thorley	16

Women

Event	Gold		Silver		Bronze	
Cross-country	Núria Bosch Picó; Menorca	1:09:20	Kerry MacPhee; Western Isles	1:09:54	Emily Bridson; Jersey	1:13:34
Criterium	Núria Bosch Picó; Menorca	34:00.35	Kerry MacPhee; Western Isles	34:40.81	Kirree Quayle; Isle of Man	34:53.38
Team cross-country	Guernsey; Megan Dowinton; Jade Packham; Johanna Petit; Kylie Vaudin; Chloe Woods	11	Isle of Man; Sacha Horsthuis; Kirree Quayle	12	not awarded	
Team criterium	Isle of Man; Sacha Horsthuis; Kirree Quayle	11	Guernsey; Megan Dowinton; Jade Packham; Johanna Petit; Kylie Vaudin; Chloe Woods	11	not awarded	

=== Road cycling ===
Men

Event	Gold		Silver		Bronze	
Time trial	Kevin Chant; Isle of Wight	36:34.11	Sam Culverwell; Guernsey	37:40.99	John Pallot; Jersey	37:59.64
Criterium	Sam Culverwell; Guernsey	48:02	Jörgen Matt; Saaremaa	48:42	John Pallot; Jersey	48:45
Road race	Sam Culverwell; Guernsey	2:38:38	Karl Patrick Lauk; Saaremaa	2:38:39	Roberto Ledesma Estevez; Menorca	2:38:39
Team time trial	Isle of Wight; Elvis Belton; Kevin Chant; Nicolas Hutchings; George Spooner; Joe Staunton	1:54:47.5	Guernsey; Marc Cox; Sam Culverwell; Matthew Osborn; Jack Reed; Alex Van Katwyk	1:54:48.7	Jersey; Ollie Cadin; Zack Hamon; John Pallot; Jack Rebours; Dean Robson	1:55:11.8
Team criterium	Saaremaa; Steven Kalf; Karl Patrick Lauk; Jörgen Matt; Mihkel Räim; Indrek Rannama	16	Isle of Man; Michael Faid; Jamie Fletcher; Mark Horsthuis; Niall Quiggin	22	Jersey; Ollie Cadin; Zack Hamon; John Pallot; Jack Rebours; Dean Robson	24
Team road race	Saaremaa; Steven Kalf; Karl Patrick Lauk; Jörgen Matt; Mihkel Räim; Indrek Rannama	15	Guernsey; Marc Cox; Sam Culverwell; Matthew Osborn; Jack Reed; Alex Van Katwyk	21	Isle of Wight; Elvis Belton; Kevin Chant; Nicolas Hutchings; George Spooner; Joe Staunton	24

Women

Event	Gold		Silver		Bronze	
Time trial	Hannah Brehaut; Guernsey	44:17.15	Flo Thomas; Jersey	44:50.89	Gwenno Hughes; Ynys Môn	45:06.59
Criterium	Olivia Lett; Gibraltar	45:40	Flo Thomas; Jersey	45:45	Elaine Pratts; Gibraltar	45:46
Road race	Jamie-Lee Wright; Guernsey	02:00:45	Hannah Brehaut; Guernsey	02:00:46	Flo Thomas; Jersey	02:00:47
Team time trial	Guernsey; Hannah Brehaut; Helena Duguid; Danielle Hanley; Karina Jackson; Jamie-Lee Wright	1:29:35	Gibraltar; Olivia Lett; Natalia Nunez; Elaine Pratts	1:31:53	not awarded	
Team criterium	Gibraltar; Olivia Lett; Natalia Nunez; Elaine Pratts	4	not awarded		not awarded	
Team road race	Guernsey; Hannah Brehaut; Helena Duguid; Danielle Hanley; Karina Jackson; Jamie-Lee Wright	3	Jersey; Katie Silva; Flo Thomas; Chloe Watson Hill	7	Gibraltar; Olivia Lett; Natalia Nunez; Elaine Pratts	13
