= 2027 Island Games =

International multi-sport event

- Logo
- Country: Faroe Islands
- Teams: 27 islands (confirmed)
- Events: 14 sports
- Opening: 3 July 2027
- Closing: 9 July 2027
- Opened by: Beinir Johannesen (announced)
- Ceremony venue: Tórsvøllur (football)
- Website: www.faroeislands2027.fo

The 2027 Island Games (Faroese: Oyggjaleikir 2027), known as the Betri Island Games (Betri Oyggjaleikir) for sponsorship purposes, are an upcoming edition of the Island Games to be hosted in the Faroe Islands. They are planned to take place from 3–9 July 2027, and 27 island teams are expected to participate.

== Host ==
The 2027 edition of the Island Games were initially planned to be hosted in Ynys Môn, but Ynis Môn backed out on account of financial pressure caused by the COVID-19 pandemic in the United Kingdom. In December 2023, it was announced that the Faroe Islands would replace Ynis Môn as the hosts. The 2027 Games will be the second time that the Faroe Islands have hosted the Island Games, the first time being in 1989.

== Sports ==
Fourteen sports are planned to be included in the 2027 Games. Judo, basketball, shooting, table tennis, tennis, volleyball, and beach volleyball are all returning to the Games after not being present at the 2025 Island Games in Orkney. Golf, sailing, bowls, and squash were dropped from the 2027 itinerary.

As of 11 December 2025, the planned sports and venues are as follows:

- Archery held at the football field in Miðvágur
- Athletics at the Tórsbreyt athletic stadium in Tórshavn
- Badminton at the Høllin á Hálsi sports hall
- Basketball at the Við Tjarnir sports arena
- Cycling in and around Tórshavn
- Football at the Tórsvøllur national football stadium in ceremonies, along with smaller fields and Trongisvágur, Vágur, Norðragøta, Tórshavn, Eiði, Fuglafjørður, Streymnes, Sandur, Skáli, Sørvágur and Toftir
- Gymnastics at the Bylgjan gymnastics centre
- Judo at the Við Tjarnir Multi Purpose Arena in judo venue in Tórshavn
- Shooting at the Sandvík shooting range
- Swimming at the Tórshavn swimming complex
- Table tennis at the Hoyvíkshøllin sports hall
- Tennis at the tennis courts in Gundadalur, along with arenas at Sandur, Kollafjørður and Skála
- Triathlon in Tórshavn. Due to low sea temperatures, the swimming portion will be held indoors at the Tórshavn Aquatics Centre
- Volleyball at two connected sports halls in Klaksvík
  - Beach volleyball at Sandavágur and Fuglafjørður

== Participants ==
24 islands are expected to participate:

- Åland
- Alderney
- Bermuda
- British Virgin Islands (Debut)
- Cayman Islands
- Falkland Islands
- Faroe Islands (Host)
- Frøya
- Gibraltar
- Gotland
- Gozo
- Greenland
- Guam (Debut)
- Guernsey
- Hitra
- Iceland (Returned)
- Isle of Man
- Isle of Wight
- Jersey
- Menorca
- Orkney
- Saaremaa
- Sark
- Shetland Islands
- Saint Helena
- Western Isles
- Ynys Môn
