= Charlton Debono =

Maltese long-distance runner

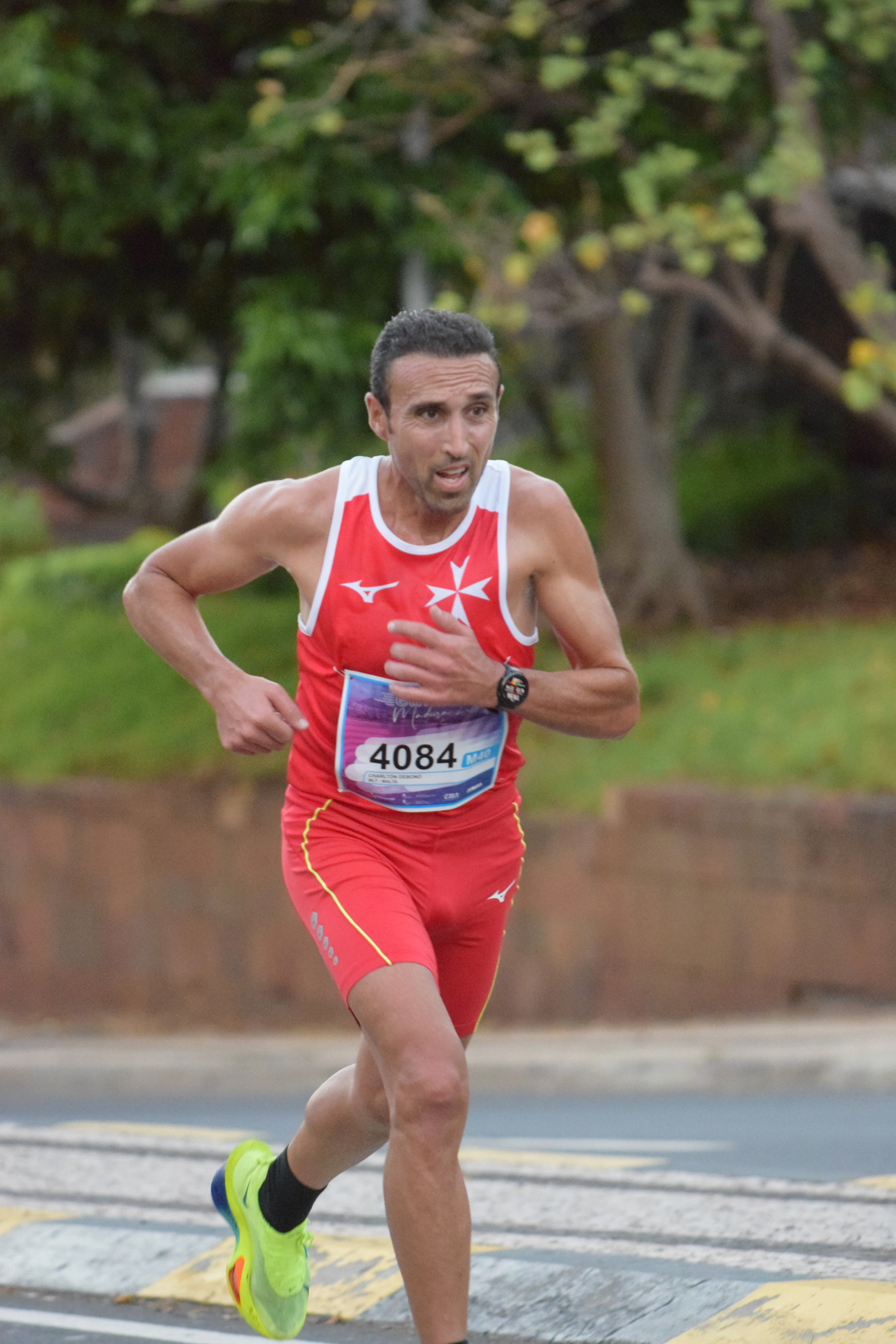
- Charlton Debono in 2025.

Personal information
- Born: 11 August 1984 (age 41)

Sport
- Country: Malta
- Sport: Long-distance running

Charlton Debono (born 11 August 1984) is a Maltese long-distance runner.

In 2018, he competed in the men's half marathon at the 2018 IAAF World Half Marathon Championships held in Valencia, Spain. He finished in 130th place. In 2020, he competed in the men's race at the 2020 World Athletics Half Marathon Championships held in Gdynia, Poland. In July 2025, Debono competed in the Island Games in Orkney, earning a bronze medal in the men's 10000 metres.
