= Shooting at the 2023 Island Games =

- Venue: Various
- Dates: 9–14 July
- Nations: 18

Shooting, for the 2023 Island Games, took place at 5 different venues in Guernsey in July 2023.

== Medal table ==
* Host nation (Guernsey)

Rank	Nation	Gold	Silver	Bronze	Total
1	Guernsey*	16	9	8	33
2	Isle of Wight	9	10	4	23
3	Gotland	7	1	2	10
4	Jersey	2	9	4	15
5	Faroe Islands	2	2	3	7
6	Menorca	1	2	1	4
7	Isle of Man	1	1	5	7
8	Gozo	1	1	1	3
8	Ynys Môn	1	1	1	3
8	Åland	1	1	1	3
11	Gibraltar	0	2	4	6
12	Hitra Municipality	0	1	5	6
13	Sark	0	1	0	1
14	Falkland Islands	0	0	1	1
Totals (14 entries)		41	41	40	122

== Results ==
=== ISSF (International Shooting Sport Federation) ===
==== Pistol ====
Event	Gold		Silver		Bronze	
Men's 10 m air pistol	Morgan Johansson Cropper; Gotland	237.6	Paul Guillou; Guernsey	226.6	Stellan Egeland; Åland	207.9
Women's 10 m air pistol	Shelley Sprack; Isle of Wight	222.5	Sarah Chalker; Jersey	219.9	Kathryn Holden; Isle of Man	197.6
Men's 25 m standard pistol	Pontus Nordgren; Gotland	552	Jonathan David Patron; Gibraltar	540	Bengt Hyytiäinen; Gotland	526
Women's 25 m standard pistol	Tara Leighton-Dyson; Guernsey	539	Shelley Sprack; Isle of Wight	522	Nikki Trebert; Guernsey	521
Women's 25 m sports pistol	Tara Leighton-Dyson; Guernsey	556	Imogen Reed; Isle of Wight	547	Sarah Chalker; Jersey	547
Men's 25 m centrefire	Fredrik Blomqvist; Åland	549	Eric de Saumarez; Guernsey	534	Peter Nordgren; Gotland	534
Open 50 m free pistol	Morgan Johansson Cropper; Gotland	554	Matthew Reed; Isle of Wight	540	Jonathan David Patron; Gibraltar	525
Men's 10 m air pistol team	Gotland; Morgan Johansson Cropper; Pontus Nordgren	1120	Guernsey; Paul Guillou; Jack Hanca	1092	Isle of Wight; Perron Phipps; Matthew Reed	1082
Women's 10 m air pistol team	Guernsey; Tara Leighton-Dyson; Nikki Trebert	1080	Isle of Wight; Imogen Reed; Shelley Sprack	1070	Isle of Man; Kathryn Holden; Blae Richardson	1062
Men's 25 m standard pistol team	Gotland; Bengt Hyytiäinen; Pontus Nordgren	1078	Gibraltar; Louis Philip Baglietto; Jonathan David Patron	1051	Hitra; Roy Aune; Jørgen Olsen	1024
Women's 25 m standard pistol team	Guernsey; Tara Leighton-Dyson; Nikki Trebert	1060	Isle of Wight; Imogen Reed; Shelley Sprack	1033	Gibraltar; Anita Chaperon; Bettina Manner	931
Men's 25 m centrefire team	Guernsey; Eric de Saumarez; Jack Hanca	1062	Gotland; Thomas Larsson; Peter Nordgren	1057	Isle of Wight; Perron Phipps; Matthew Reed	
Women's 25 m sport pistol team	Guernsey; Tara Leighton-Dyson; Nikki Trebert	1094	Isle of Wight; Imogen Reed; Shelley Sprack	1079	Gibraltar; Anita Chaperon; Bettina Manner	1049
Open 50 m free pistol team	Gotland; Bengt Hyytiäinen; Morgan Johansson Cropper	1056	Isle of Wight; Perron Phipps; Matthew Reed	1044	Guernsey; Paul Guillou; Tara Leighton-Dyson	1026

==== Rifle ====
Event	Gold		Silver		Bronze	
Men's 10 m air rifle	Luke Malčić; Guernsey	240.1	Paul Guillou; Guernsey	238.2	Guy Moss; Isle of Wight	213.9
Women's 10 m air rifle	Elizabeth Hart; Jersey	235.3	Andrea Guillou; Guernsey	234.2	Paige Fryer; Jersey	212.3
Open 10 m air rifle team	Guernsey; Paul Guillou; Luke Malčić	1191.8	Jersey; Paige Fryer; Elizabeth Hart	1174.4	Guernsey; Andrea Guillou; Amy Woodland	1167.9

=== Automatic Ball Trap ===
Event	Gold		Silver		Bronze	
Men's Automatic Ball Trap	Alex Johannesen; Faroe Islands	127	Juan Manuel Bagur Bosch; Menorca	126	Robert Watterson; Isle of Man	116
Men's Automatic Ball Trap team	Faroe Islands; Per Simunarson Hansen; Alex Johannesen	148	Menorca; Juan Manuel Bagur Bosch; Sebastian Bosch Moll	145	Guernsey; Darren Burtenshaw; Alex Williams	145

=== English Skeet ===
Event	Gold		Silver		Bronze	
Open English Skeet	David Tavernor; Ynys Môn	140	Nicholas Mihailovits; Isle of Man	140	Mark Andrews; Jersey	136
Open English Skeet team	Guernsey; Matthew Spruce; John Wild	186	Jersey; Mark Andrews; Alex Bailey	181	Ynys Môn; Frederick Roberts; David Tavernor	177

=== English Sporting ===
Event	Gold		Silver		Bronze	
Men's English Sporting	Daniel Bishop; Isle of Wight	89	Lee Pitman; Isle of Wight	85	Mark Downer; Isle of Wight	82
Women's English Sporting	Jennie Cartwright; Isle of Wight	78	Katie Bishop; Isle of Wight	67	Lara Calleja; Gozo	67
Men's English Sporting team	Isle of Wight; Daniel Bishop; Mark Downer; Lee Pitman	180	Guernsey; Ross Angus; James Ashplant; Clifford Eborall	163	Isle of Man; Michael Cross; Stan Cross; Alan Kinrade	158
Women's English Sporting team	Isle of Wight; Katie Bishop; Jennie Cartwright; Sarah Franklin	142	Guernsey; Alison Damarell; Lucy Slimm; Janet Vining	126	not awarded	

=== Fullbore Kings ===
Event	Gold		Silver		Bronze	
Open Fullbore Kings	Robert Waters; Guernsey	391-46v	Matt Neal; Jersey	389-40v	Mark Dodd; Falkland Islands	382-34v
Open Fullbore Kings pairs	Guernsey; Ollie Hudson; Nicholas Kerins	588-70v	Jersey; Michael Cotillard; Matt Neal	571-54v	not awarded	

=== NPA (Natural Point of Aim) ===
Event	Gold		Silver		Bronze	
Open NPA Police Pistol 1	Andrew Torode; Guernsey	295	Jai Nolan; Isle of Wight	294	Jørgen Olsen; Hitra	292
Open NPA Service Pistol B	Andrew Torode; Guernsey	106	Ben Videgrain; Jersey	103	Jørgen Olsen; Hitra	102
Open NPA Police Pistol 1 team	Guernsey; James Straughan; Andrew Torode	584	Jersey; Benjamin Videgrain; Keith Videgrain	578	Hitra Municipality; Roy Aune; Jørgen Olsen	568
Open NPA Service Pistol B team	Jersey; Spencer Barr; Ben Videgrain	203	Hitra Municipality; Roy Aune; Jørgen Olsen	201	Guernsey; James Straughan; Andrew Torode	189

=== Olympic ===
Event	Gold		Silver		Bronze	
Open Olympic Skeet	Marlon Attard; Gozo	52	Torur Flott; Faroe Islands	46	Johann Flott; Faroe Islands	38
Men's Olympic Trap	Juan Manuel Bagur Bosch; Menorca		Finn Ludvig; Faroe Islands		Kevin Cowles; Gibraltar	
Men's Olympic Skeet team	Gotland; Jonny Lindstedt; Fredrik Melin	171	Åland Islands; Bengt-Olof Lindgren; Marcus Påvals	166	Faroe Islands; Jóhann Fløtt; Tórur Fløtt	156
Men's Olympic Trap team	Isle of Man; Mark Riley; Robert Watterson	164	Sark; Nicholas Dewe; Stefan Roberts	163	Faroe Islands; Jón Hjørleifson Jacobsen; Finn Ludvig	162
Men's Olympic Trap team	Isle of Man; Mark Riley; Robert Watterson	164	Sark; Nicholas Dewe; Stefan Roberts	163	Guernsey; Darren Burtenshaw; Alex Williams	162
Men's Olympic Trap team	Isle of Man; Mark Riley; Robert Watterson	164	Sark; Nicholas Dewe; Stefan Roberts	163	Menorca; Juan Manuel Bagur Bosch; Sebastian Bosch Moll	162

=== Sport Trap ===
Event	Gold		Silver		Bronze	
Men's Sport Trap	Daniel Bishop; Isle of Wight	85	John Wild; Guernsey	85	Martin Kneen; Isle of Man	81
Women's Sport Trap	Jennie Cartwright; Isle of Wight	80	Lara Calleja; Gozo	67	Janet Vining; Guernsey	64
Men's Sport Trap team	Isle of Wight; Daniel Bishop; Mark Downer; Lee Pitman	170	Guernsey; Ross Angus; Clifford Eborall; John Wild	164	Jersey; Iain Barette; David Le Rendu; Greg Sanderson	157
Women's Sport Trap team	Isle of Wight; Katie Bishop; Jennie Cartwright; Sarah Franklin	143	Ynys Môn; Bonny Cunliffe; Catriona Duffy; Nia Rogers	117	not awarded	

=== WA (World Association) ===
Event	Gold		Silver		Bronze	
Open Revolver WA 1500 48 shot-max 6" barrel	Andrew Torode; Guernsey	474	Ben Videgrain; Jersey	471	James Straughan; Guernsey	469
Open Revolver WA 1500 48 shot-max 6" barrel team	Guernsey; James Straughan; Andrew Torode	943	Jersey; Spencer Barr; Ben Videgrain	935	Hitra; Roy Aune; Jørgen Olsen	925

== Venues ==
- Guernsey Clay Range - Portinfer
- Mont Herault, Saint Pierre du Bois
- Aztech Centre, Hougue du Pommier
- Fort Le Marchant, L'Ancresse, Vale
- Chouet, Vale
