= Will Draper =

British triathlete (born 2000)

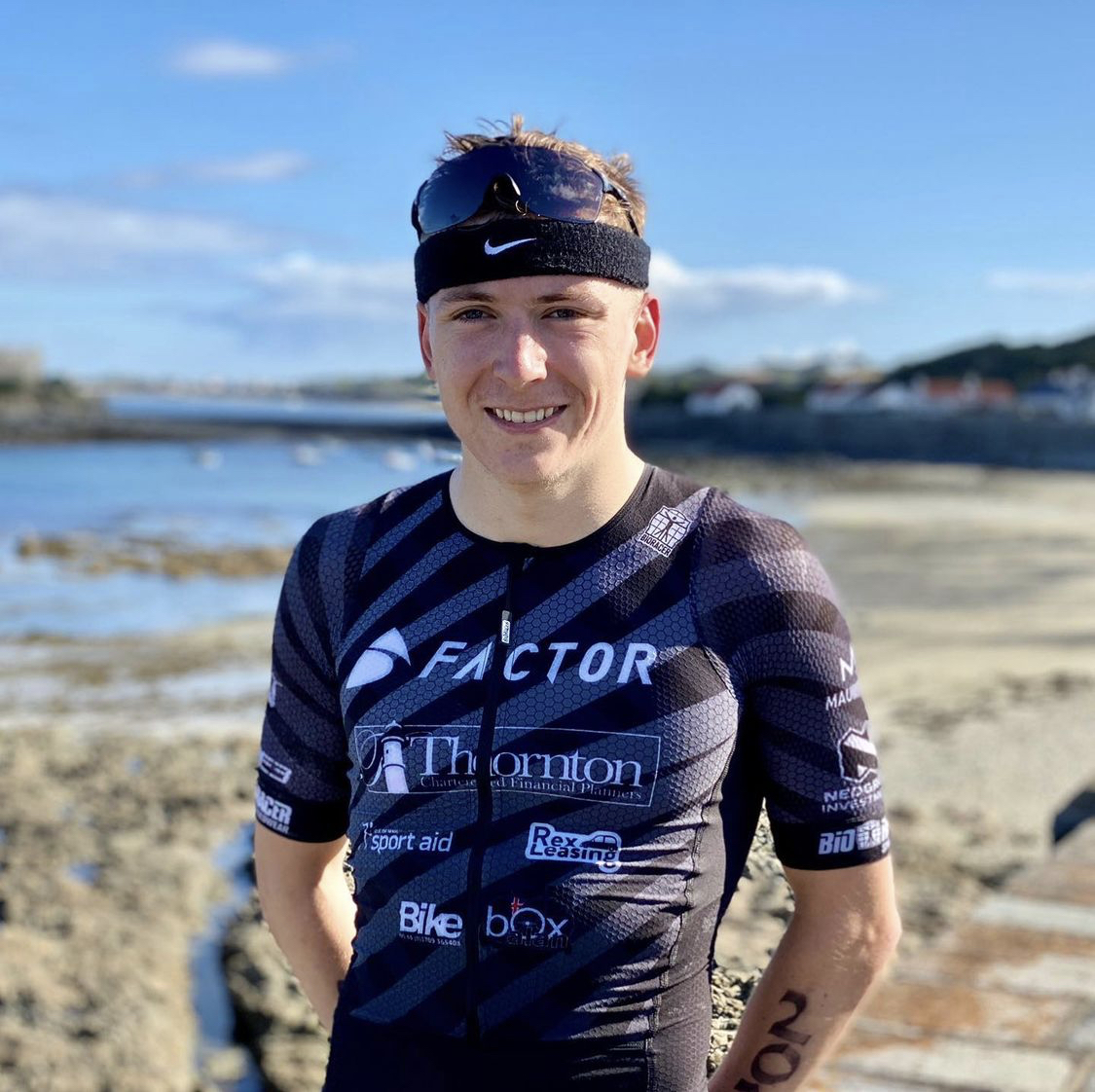

Personal information
- Nationality: Manx
- Born: William Draper; 14 January 2000 (age 26) Isle of Man
- Occupation: Professional triathlete

Sport
- Turned pro: 2021
Medal record
Men's triathlon
Representing Isle of Man
Island Games
Silver medal – second place	2019 Gibraltar	Individual
Bronze medal – third place	2019 Gibraltar	Team

Will Draper (born 14 January 2000) is a professional British triathlete from the Isle of Man. Before starting a career in triathlon, Draper competed as a cyclist where he represented the Isle of Man at the 2017 Commonwealth Youth Games in the Bahamas for cycling. Draper won the English Triathlon Championships in 2019 before making his triathlon professional debut in 2021.

== Early sporting career ==
Will started his sporting career as a cyclist where he won the National Youth Circuit Race Championships at 12 years old at the Cyclopark in Kent, London. Will finished 2nd in the 2012 British Cycling National Youth Series (U12); 4th in the 2014 British Cycling National Youth Series (U14) and 3rd in the 2016 British Cycling National Youth Series (U16). He later went on to win the Madison event at the British Youth and Junior Track National Championships in 2016. In 2017 (age 17) Will signed for professional junior racing team HMT with JLT Condor Cycling Team (HMT). Whilst racing for team HMT Will finished 16th overall at the UCI Junior 2.1 stage race Ronde des Vallées 5th at the Grand Prix de Cherves as well as 14th overall at the Junior Tour of Wales which was won by his elder brother Nathan Draper in 2015. During 2017 Will also represented the Isle of Man at the Commonwealth Youth Games where he finished 5th in the road race with teammate Jimmy Bostock taking the victory.

== Triathlon career ==
During his first year of triathlon Will won the English Triathlon Championships in 2019 and later went on to represent the Isle of Man at the 2019 Island Games for triathlon where he won individual silver and team bronze and also competed in the 5 km run on the track where he finished 4th. During 2020 Will competed away from home twice. Firstly in the Rocquaine Olympic distance triathlon in Gurnsey where he won by over 8 minutes and secondly at the Outlaw X middle-distance triathlon where he finished 7th and this (according to his own social media) is where he earned his professional license. With the return of more races in 2021 Will began his professional debut season by competing in the PTO supported Eton Dorney triathlon. Several weeks later he competed at the again PTO supported Outlaw Half Holkham where he finished 4th. Will made his first international appearance as a professional triathlete at the Challenge Davos event in Switzerland where he finished 5th. Will has also competed in off-road triathlon events having won the Isle of Man Granite Mann on several occasions and holding the current course record. Will is currently sponsored by international bike manufacturing company Factor Bikes and says the partnership has allowed him to focus more on swimming and running.
