= Island Games =

International multi-sports event

- Genre: Multi-sports event
- Frequency: Biennial
- Location: Various
- Inaugurated: 1985; 41 years ago
- Most recent: 2025 Island Games
- Next event: 2027 Island Games
- Participants: ~ 2,000
- Organiser: IIGA
- Sponsor: Orkney Builders, Shiela Fleet, Loganair and others
- Website: Official IIGA website

The Island Games are biennial international multi-sports events organised by the International Island Games Association (IIGA). Competitor teams each represent different island communities (with one team from the peninsula of Gibraltar) which are IIGA members. Currently, all competitor teams represent non-sovereign territories of European nations—some within European waters and some further overseas.

The games are being hosted by the Faroe Islands in 2027. The previous edition was the 2025, which took place in Orkney with around 2,200 competitors from 24 islands or island groups participating in 14 sports.

== History ==
The Island Games began in 1985 as the Inter-Island Games, as part of the Isle of Man International Year of Sport, and were intended to be a one-off sporting celebration only. Geoffrey Corlett, who became the first Games Director, not only contacted the islands surrounding the United Kingdom, but also encouraged the countries of Iceland and Malta, the territories of Faroe Islands, Greenland, Saint Helena, the Channel Islands and others to participate.

Initially, fifteen islands with 600 competitors and officials took part in seven sports, with the total cost of staging the Games being put at £70,000. The track and field events were held on an eight-lane grass track, a far cry from the current games, which now use synthetic tracks in stadiums capable of holding thousands of spectators. The Games of 1985 were so successful that organisers decided to hold a similar event two years later. The Games have grown from strength to strength, with limits now in place for the number of teams, and the number of sports at each Games, currently 12 to 14. Sark could be considered the most successful island, their population of 600 having acquired 20 medals by 2015, one for every 30 people.

NatWest International has been the main sponsor of the Games since 1999. In April 2018, they signed a deal extending their sponsorship until at least 2021. In 2020, Natwest International confirmed the Guernsey games, originally scheduled for 2021, but delayed to 2023, due to the COVID-19 pandemic would be the last tournament they would be sponsoring. At the time the replacement sponsor had not been confirmed.

A traditional symbol of the games was started in 1991 when Åland asked all teams to bring some water from their islands, which was then mixed in a fountain. In all subsequent games, water from the previous fountain has added samples of water from each island competing in the new games, creating a symbol of "mixing together".

== Editions ==
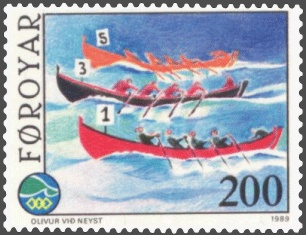
Faroese stamp to the 1989 Island Games: Rowing

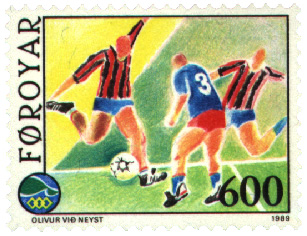
Football

Guernsey put in a bid for the 2021 Games following the Faroe Islands' withdrawal from hosting. The bid was approved in July 2016. Due to the COVID-19 pandemic, the 2021 Games were cancelled and rescheduled for 2023 with Guernsey still as hosts, with future hosts pushed out by two years as well.

Orkney hosted the 2025 Games. They were awarded the right to host on 7 July 2018 at the AGM in Gibraltar.

The Isle of Man made an official bid to host the Island Games in 2029 in July 2023. They were awarded the right to host on 16 July 2024 at the AGM in Orkney. Gotland was confirmed as the preferred bidder for the 2031 Island Games.

In August 2018 it was reported that the Falkland Islands are considering hosting the Games in 2033.

In December 2023 it was announced that the Faroe Islands would replace Ynys Môn as the hosts of the 2027 games due to funding having been directed to the COVID-19 pandemic. The Faroe Islands, who had submitted a bid for the 2031 games, expressed a desire to host the games early, having previously guaranteed funding towards the games in 2018, and they were selected as a replacement for Ynys Môn.

Year	Games	Host island	Numbers of participants	Athletes	Sports
1985	I	Isle of Man	15	700	7
1987	II	Guernsey	18	1,049	9
1989	III	Faroe Islands	15	800	11
1991	IV	Åland	17	1,500	13
1993	V	Isle of Wight	19	1,448	14
1995	VI	Gibraltar	18	1,214	13
1997	VII	Jersey	20	~2,000	13
1999	VIII	Gotland	22	1,858	14
2001	IX	Isle of Man	22	2,020	15
2003	X	Guernsey	23	2,129	15
2005	XI	Shetland	24	1,658	14
2007	XII	Rhodes	25	2,343	14
2009	XIII	Åland	24	2,286	14
2011	XIV	Isle of Wight	24	2,311	14
2013	XV	Bermuda	22	1,296	14
2015	XVI	Jersey	24	2,430	14
2017	XVII	Gotland	23	2,333	14
2019	XVIII	Gibraltar	22	1,700	14
2021	Postponed due to the COVID-19 pandemic				
2023	XIX	Guernsey	24	2,194	14
2025	XX	Orkney	24	1,630	12
2027	XXI	Faroe Islands	27		14
2029	XXII	Isle of Man			14
2031	XXIII	Gotland			

== Participation ==
A total of 28 islands, island groups or territories have participated in the Island Games; eleven of these have participated in every Island Games.

Locations of Island Games teams
Locations of Island Games teams in Europe

=== Medals ===
Every island has won at least 4 medals with Alderney the only island awaiting their first Gold.

Island Games participants and total medals won (to 2023)
Island(s)	Country (and status)	Population	Years	Gold	Silver	Bronze	Total
Åland	Finland (autonomous region)	28,666	1985–	191	200	190.5	581.5
Alderney	United Kingdom (Note: British Overseas Territories and Crown Dependencies are not part of the United Kingdom.) (Bailiwick of Guernsey)	2,167	1987, 1993–	0	2	3	5
Bermuda	United Kingdom (overseas territory)	63,680	2003–	107	115	119	341
Cayman Islands	United Kingdom (overseas territory)	90,577	1999–	133	107	91	331
Falkland Islands	United Kingdom (overseas territory)	3,662	1993–	2	11	13	26
Faroe Islands	Denmark (autonomous territory)	56,210	1985–	269	255	301	825
Frøya	Norway (island municipality) (Note: Connected to their main countries by road.)	5,453	1985–	1	1	2	4
Gibraltar	United Kingdom (overseas territory)	37,936	1987–	77.5	86.5	119	283
Gotland	Sweden (county)	61,029	1985–	336.5	245.5	252	834
Gozo	Malta (island)	39,300	2023–	1	2	1	4
Greenland	Denmark (autonomous territory)	56,831	1989–	24	31	38.5	93.5
Guam	United States (unincorporated territory)		2027–				
Guernsey	United Kingdom (crown dependency)	64,781	1985–	536	549	534	1619
Hitra	Norway (island municipality)	5,323	1985–1989, 1997–	4	10	15	28
Isle of Man	United Kingdom (crown dependency)	84,975	1985–	530	495	460.5	1485.5
Isle of Wight	United Kingdom (English county)	141,660	1985–	203	208	220	621
Jersey	United Kingdom (crown dependency)	104,490	1985–	634	625	560.3	1819.3
Menorca	Spain (island)	102,477	2007–	57	57	71	185
Orkney	United Kingdom (Scottish council area)	21,920	1985–	23	41	44	108
Saaremaa	Estonia (county)	31,000	1991–	126	129	101.5	356.5
Saint Helena	United Kingdom (overseas territory)	3,980	1985–1987, 1997–	3	3	5	11
Sark	United Kingdom (Bailiwick of Guernsey)	562	1987–2011, 2015–	3	17	7	27
Shetland	United Kingdom (Scottish council area)	22,710	1985–	62	83	113	258
Western Isles	United Kingdom (Scottish council area)	25,770	2005–	28	26	27	81
(Anglesey) Ynys Môn	United Kingdom (Welsh principal area)	68,607	1985–	43	42	57	142
Iceland		394,324	1985–1997	50	45	40.7	135.7
Malta		588,254	1985–1987	6	2	2	10
Prince Edward Island	Canada (province)	182,989	1991–2007	6	6	9	21
Rhodes	Greece (island; Regional Unit (Περιφερειακή ενότητα))	127,613	1999–2011, 2015	53	52	45	150

Islands marked in grey are no longer members of the IIGA and so cannot compete at the Island Games.

=== Participation in other games ===
Of the 24 current IIGA members, two (Bermuda and the Cayman Islands) have competed in their own right at the Olympic Games.

Bermuda, the Cayman Islands, the Falkland Islands, Gibraltar, Guernsey, the Isle of Man, Jersey and St. Helena have each sent teams to the Commonwealth Games.

=== Olympic athletes ===
Islanders who have gone on to participate in Olympic Games events include:

- Sir Mark Cavendish (Isle of Man) — cycling (Olympic silver medal winner)
- Alastair Chalmers (Guernsey) - 400m hurdles - Paris 2024
- Cameron Chalmers (Guernsey) - 4 × 400m - Tokyo 2020
- Dale Garland (Guernsey) - 4 × 400m - Beijing 2008
- Rebecca Heyliger (Bermuda) - swimming
- Pál Joensen (Faroe Islands) — swimming (World Championship bronze medal winner)
- Lee Merrien (Guernsey) - Marathon - London 2012
- Cydonie Mothersille (Cayman Islands) — 200m (World Championship bronze medal winner)
- Kelly Sotherton (Isle of Wight) — heptathlon and 400m (Olympic bronze medal winner)
- Mattias Sunneborn (Gotland) — long jump and 200m (World Indoor Championship silver medal winner)
- Albert Torres (Menorca) — cycling (World Championship gold medal winner)
- Andres Lauk (Saaremaa) − cycling − Atlanta 1996

== Sports ==
The host island chooses between 12 and 14 different sports for their games from this list:

Sport	I	II	III	IV	V	VI	VII	VIII	IX	X	XI	XII	XIII	XIV	XV	XVI	XVII	XVIII	XIX	Total	XX	XXI
Archery		✓	✓	✓	✓	✓	✓	✓	✓	✓	✓	✓	✓	✓		✓	✓		✓	16	✓	
Athletics	✓	✓	✓	✓	✓	✓	✓	✓	✓	✓	✓	✓	✓	✓	✓	✓	✓	✓	✓	19	✓	
Badminton	✓	✓	✓	✓	✓	✓	✓	✓	✓	✓	✓		✓	✓	✓	✓	✓	✓	✓	18	✓	
Basketball								✓	✓	✓		✓	✓	✓	✓	✓	✓	✓	✓	11		
Bowls (Indoor‡, Lawn∞, or Ten Pin*)		✓ ‡						✓ *			✓ ‡							✓ *	✓ ‡	5	✓ ∞	
Cycling	✓	✓	✓	✓	✓	✓	✓	✓	✓	✓	✓	✓		✓	✓	✓	✓	✓	✓	18	✓	
Football	✓		✓	✓	✓	✓	✓	✓	✓	✓	✓	✓	✓	✓	✓	✓	✓		✓	17	✓	
Golf				✓	✓		✓	✓	✓	✓	✓	✓	✓	✓	✓	✓	✓		✓	14	✓	
Gymnastics			✓	✓	✓	✓	✓		✓	✓	✓		✓		✓		✓	✓		12	✓	
Judo			✓	✓	✓	✓						✓	✓					✓		7		
Sailing (may include Sailboarding*)					✓ *	✓ *	✓ *	✓	✓	✓ *	✓ *	✓ *	✓ *	✓ *	✓ *	✓ *		✓	✓	14	✓	
Shooting	✓	✓	✓	✓	✓	✓	✓	✓	✓	✓	✓	✓	✓	✓	✓	✓	✓	✓	✓	19	✓	
Squash											✓			✓	✓			✓		4	✓	
Swimming	✓	✓	✓	✓	✓	✓	✓	✓	✓	✓	✓	✓	✓	✓	✓	✓	✓	✓	✓	19	✓	
Table Tennis		✓	✓	✓	✓	✓	✓	✓	✓	✓	✓	✓	✓	✓		✓	✓	✓	✓	17		
Tennis				✓	✓	✓	✓	✓	✓	✓		✓	✓	✓	✓	✓	✓	✓	✓	15		
Triathlon									✓	✓		✓			✓	✓	✓	✓	✓	8	✓	
Volleyball (may include Beach Volleyball*)	✓	✓	✓	✓	✓	✓	✓	✓	✓	✓	✓	✓ *	✓	✓	✓ *	✓ *	✓	✓ *		18		
Total sports	7	9	11	13	14	13	13	14	15	15	14	14	14	14	14	14	14	14	14		13	

The Island Games' football tournament is an established tournament of non-FIFA international football.

== See also ==
- Indian Ocean Island Games
