= International Island Games Association =

Organizer of the Island Games

- Formation: 1985
- Headquarters: Douglas, Isle of Man
- Members: 24 islands
- Website: https://www.iiga.org/

The International Island Games Association (IIGA) is the organising body for the Island Games, a friendly biennial multi-sport competition between teams from several European islands and other small territories (24 members from 8 nations). The IIGA liaises with the member island associations and with sponsors of the games. It investigates whether islands wanting to join fit the membership criteria.

== Members ==
The IIGA was founded in the Isle of Man in 1985. Constituents come from islands in, or associated with, eight sovereign states (Denmark, Estonia, Finland, Malta, Norway, Spain, Sweden, and the United Kingdom). The 24 current members of the IIGA are:

- Åland
- Alderney
- Bermuda
- Cayman Islands
- Falkland Islands
- Faroe Islands
- Frøya
- Gibraltar
- Gotland
- Gozo
- Greenland
- Guernsey
- Hitra
- Isle of Man
- Isle of Wight
- Jersey
- Menorca
- Orkney
- Saaremaa
- Saint Helena
- Sark
- Shetland
- Western Isles
- Ynys Môn

Gibraltar is the only member of the IIGA that is not an island or group of islands, as it is a peninsula of Iberia, sharing a land border with Spain. Ynys Môn (Anglesey), Frøya and Hitra have bridge or tunnel connections to their mainlands. Greenland is by far the largest island, and is magnitudes bigger than all the rest combined, but is very sparsely populated. Former members of the IIGA include the countries Iceland and Malta, Canada's island province Prince Edward Island, and the Rhodes island of Greece.

=== By country ===
1. Denmark (2):Faroe Islands - Greenland
2. Estonia (1):Saare County
3. Finland (1):Åland
4. Malta (1):Gozo
5. Norway (2):Frøya - Hitra
6. Spain (1):Menorca
7. Sweden (1):Gotland
8. United Kingdom (10):Bermuda - Cayman Islands - Falkland Islands - Gibraltar - Isle of Wight - Orkney - Saint Helena - Shetland - Western Isles - Ynys Môn
9. Guernsey (3) Guernsey - Alderney - Sark
10. Isle of Man (1) Isle of Man
11. Jersey (1) Jersey

=== Membership criteria ===
The IIGA constitution lists the criteria which apply to new applicants. These limit applications to island territories with populations less than 125,000. There must be a local association of governing bodies of at least two sports in the IIGA program at which the island can "adequately" compete. Membership is limited to 25.
