= 2025 Island Games =

International multi-sport event

- Host city: Kirkwall/Stromness
- Country: Orkney
- Teams: 24 islands
- Athletes: 2,000–2,500
- Events: 12 sports
- Opening: 12 July 2025
- Closing: 18 July 2025
- Main venue: The Pickaquoy Centre
- Website: www.orkney2025.com

The 2025 Island Games, also known as the XX Island Games, was a sports event held from 12 to 18 July 2025 in Orkney. The event returned to its traditional 2-year cycle, following the 2021 Island Games in Guernsey which were delayed to 2023 due to the COVID-19 pandemic.

== Host ==
The Orkney Islands hosted the Island Games for the first time. It was estimated that around 2,000 to 2,500 visitors and participants would attend the games, making it the biggest event ever hosted by the Orkney Islands. Orkney is one of the smallest island groups in terms of population to have ever hosted the Games. Due to the limited accommodation there, many athletes raised concerns about the travel costs and accommodation standards, which ultimately lead to the football teams from Guernsey being unable to participate. A wide range of forms of accommodation were used, including school classrooms and gym halls converted into dormitories and temporary flatpack hotels.

The Orkney Islands Council has commissioned Gabrielle Barnby to be the Scrivener for the event. Barnby has begun collecting writing submissions from island groups participating in the games, which will be compiled and showcased by the Orkney Museums. The writing project is aimed at capturing the diversity of cultures and writing within the various island communities.

The Games were formally opened by Princess Anne on 12 July 2025. The mascot of the Games was an anthropomorphic orca character named Ola, designed by a 12-year-old Orcadian girl named Sarah Sutcliffe who won a competition among 880 local children.

== Participating islands ==
24 island entities of the IIGA, from Europe, the South Atlantic and the Caribbean area, competed in the Games:

- Åland Islands
- Alderney
- Bermuda
- Cayman Islands
- Falkland Islands
- Faroe Islands
- Frøya
- Gibraltar
- Gotland
- Gozo
- Greenland
- Guernsey
- Hitra
- Isle of Man
- Isle of Wight
- Jersey
- Menorca
- Orkney (host)
- Saaremaa
- Saint Helena
- Sark
- Shetland Islands
- (Outer Hebrides) Western Isles
- (Anglesey) Ynys Môn

== Sports ==
The sports featured included:

- Archery
- Athletics
- Badminton
- Bowls
- Cycling
- Football
- Golf
- Gymnastics
- Sailing
- Squash
- Swimming
- Triathlon

== Medal table ==
* Host nation (Orkney)

2025 Island Games medals
Rank	Nation	Gold	Silver	Bronze	Total
1	Faroe Islands (FRO)	41	31	23	95
2	Jersey (JEY)	30	25	20	75
3	Guernsey (GUE)	20	19	20	59
4	Isle of Man (IOM)	19	27	34	80
5	Cayman Islands (CAY)	16	7	14	37
6	Orkney*	11	11	9	31
7	Isle of Wight (IOW)	6	3	7	16
8	Western Isles	6	1	4	11
9	Menorca	5	4	5	14
10	Saaremaa	3	1	3	7
11	Åland (ALA)	2	7	6	15
12	Ynys Môn	2	5	1	8
13	Gibraltar (GIB)	2	3	4	9
14	Bermuda (BER)	2	2	1	5
15	Shetland (SHE)	1	9	7	17
16	Falkland Islands (FLK)	1	2	2	5
16	Greenland (GRL)	1	2	2	5
18	Gotland	0	2	1	3
18	Gozo	0	2	1	3
Totals (19 entries)		168	163	164	495

== Medalists ==
=== Archery ===
Recurve

Event	Gold	Silver	Bronze
Men's score ranking	Hans Petur Højgaard; Faroe Islands	William Chater; Falkland Islands	Billy Finnie; Shetland
Men's matchplay	William Chater; Falkland Islands	Hans Petur Højgaard; Faroe Islands	Daniele Rolfi; Åland
Women's score ranking	Mollie Perrett; Jersey	Louise Clarke; Falkland Islands	Monika Komla; Guernsey
Women's matchplay	Mollie Perrett; Jersey	Monika Komla; Guernsey	Duna Anne Rocha Martos; Menorca
Mixed team score ranking	Faroe Islands; Hans Petur Højgaard; Pernille Krogh; Barbara Krossteig; Bárður Magnusson; Tóra Dinna Reynskor	Jersey; Frederick Crosby; Darren Jones; Mollie Perrett; Tony Vardon	Falkland Islands; Steve Cartwright; William Chater; Louise Clarke; Javier Lazo; Kirsty Lewis; Mark Lewis
Mixed pair matchplay	Jersey; Frederick Crosby; Mollie Perrett	Shetland; Billy Finnie; Katie MacFarlane	Guernsey; Lisa Gray; Jason Le Page
Mixed team matchplay	Faroe Islands; Hans Petur Højgaard; Bárður Magnusson; Tóra Dinna Reynskor	Guernsey; Lisa Gray; Monika Komla; Jason Le Page	Jersey; Frederick Crosby; Mollie Perrett; Tony Vardon

Compound

Event	Gold	Silver	Bronze
Men's score ranking	Nikkel Petersen; Faroe Islands	Jóannes Poulsen; Faroe Islands	Ethan Moore; Isle of Man
Men's matchplay	Nikkel Petersen; Faroe Islands	Jóannes Poulsen; Faroe Islands	Ethan Moore; Isle of Man
Women's score ranking	Anja Eydnudóttir; Faroe Islands	Zoe Gray; Guernsey	Angela Perrett; Jersey
Women's matchplay	Zoe Gray; Guernsey	Anja Eydnudóttir; Faroe Islands	Hannah Bridle; Jersey
Mixed team score ranking	Faroe Islands; Bogi Andreasen; Anja Eydnudóttir; Jógvan Niclasen; Nikkel Petersen; Jóannes Poulsen; Helena Skoraastein við Misá	Isle of Man; Aalin George; David Moore; Ethan Moore; Rhys Moore; Andrew Westmorland	Jersey; Hannah Bridle; Angela Perrett; Heath Perrett; Francisco Rocha
Mixed pair matchplay	Faroe Islands; Anja Eydnudóttir; Jóannes Poulsen	Jersey; Hannah Bridle; Francisco Rocha	Isle of Man; Aalin George; Ethan Moore
Mixed team matchplay	Faroe Islands; Anja Eydnudóttir; Nikkel Petersen; Jóannes Poulsen	Jersey; Hannah Bridle; Heath Perrett; Francisco Rocha	Isle of Man; Aalin George; Ethan Moore; Rhys Moore

=== Badminton ===
Event	Gold	Silver	Bronze
Men's singles	Rúni Øster; Faroe Islands	Toke Driefter; Greenland	Carlos Riudavets Sintes; Menorca
Men's singles	Rúni Øster; Faroe Islands	Toke Driefter; Greenland	Alexander Buck; Isle of Man
Women's singles	Miriam í Grótinum; Faroe Islands	Sara Jacobsen; Greenland	Anna Showan; Isle of Wight
Women's singles	Miriam í Grótinum; Faroe Islands	Sara Jacobsen; Greenland	Jessica Li; Isle of Man
Men's doubles	Faroe Islands; Magnus Dal-Christiansen; Rúni Øster	Guernsey; Alex Tapp; David Trebert	Greenland; Toke Driefter; Maluk Christoffersen
Men's doubles	Faroe Islands; Magnus Dal-Christiansen; Rúni Øster	Guernsey; Alex Tapp; David Trebert	Menorca; Albert Navarro Comes; Carlos Riudavets Sintes
Women's doubles	Faroe Islands; Bjarnhild í Buð Justinussen; Miriam í Grótinum	Isle of Man; Kimberley Clague; Jessica Li	Faroe Islands; Mia Thorkildshøj; Sanna Thorkildshøj
Women's doubles	Faroe Islands; Bjarnhild í Buð Justinussen; Miriam í Grótinum	Isle of Man; Kimberley Clague; Jessica Li	Orkney; Jody Groundwater; Rebecca Reid
Mixed doubles	Faroe Islands; Miriam í Grótinum; Rúni Øster	Faroe Islands; Magnus Dal-Christiansen; Sanna Thorkildshøj	Isle of Man; Jessica Li; Matthew Nicholson
Mixed doubles	Faroe Islands; Miriam í Grótinum; Rúni Øster	Faroe Islands; Magnus Dal-Christiansen; Sanna Thorkildshøj	Greenland; Maluk Christoffersen; Tina Rafaelsen
Mixed team	Greenland; Anna Lucia Arleth; Julian Arleth; Sebastian Bendtsen; Maluk Christoffersen; Toke Driefter; Malinnguaq Egede; Sara Jacobsen; Cecilia Josefsen; Tina Rafaelsen; Emilie Sørensen	Faroe Islands; Magnus Dal-Christiansen; Jónas Djurhuus; Miriam í Grótinum; Ranja Joensen; Bjarnhild í Buð Justinussen; Asbjørn Heide Olsen; Rúni Øster; Christian Berg Petersen; Mia Thorkildshøj; Sanna Thorkildshøj	Isle of Man; Alexander Buck; Tommy Cheng; Kimberley Clague; Ben Kneale; Jessica Li; Philippa Li; Annelise Mellor; Matthew Nicholson; Charlotte Watson; Baillie Watterson

=== Cycling ===
Mountain biking

Event	Gold	Silver	Bronze
Men's individual cross-country	Grant Ferguson; Shetland	Jacob Mauger; Jersey	James Dilks; Jersey
Men's team cross-country	Jersey; Liam Cadoret; Jay Cracknell; James Dilks; Jacob Mauger; Ben Richards	Isle of Man; Owen Collins; Mark Horsthuis; Eric Kelly; Callum Salisbury; Ross Thorley	Guernsey; Seth Davey; Mark Ferbrache; Mark Le Page; Peter Sargent; Charlie Tourtel
Men's individual criterium	Jaume Bosch Picó; Menorca	Grant Ferguson; Shetland	James Dilks; Jersey
Men's team criterium	Jersey; Liam Cadoret; Jay Cracknell; James Dilks; Jacob Mauger; Ben Richards	Guernsey; Seth Davey; Mark Ferbrache; Mark Le Page; Peter Sargent; Charlie Tourtel	Isle of Man; Owen Collins; Mark Horsthuis; Eric Kelly; Ross Thorley

Road cycling

Event	Gold	Silver	Bronze
Men's individual time trial	Tyler Hannay; Isle of Man	Colin Tester; Gibraltar	Philip Touzeau; Guernsey
Men's team time trial	Isle of Man; Tyler Hannay; Mark Horsthuis; Niall Quiggin; Callum Salisbury; Ivan Sorby	Jersey; Ollie Cadin; Tom Huelin; Samuel Nisbet; Jack Rebours	Gibraltar; Derek Charles Barbara; Mark Lett; Samuel O'shea; Colin Tester; James Valarino
Men's individual criterium	Aaron Genestar Sánchez; Menorca	Tyler Hannay; Isle of Man	Jacob Mauger; Jersey
Men's team criterium	Jersey; Ollie Cadin; Tom Huelin; Jacob Mauger; Samuel Nisbet; Jack Rebours	Isle of Man; Tyler Hannay; Mark Horsthuis; Niall Quiggin; Callum Salisbury; Ivan Sorby	Isle of Wight; Devon Badman; Ewan Cook; George Spooner; Christopher Till; Eli Tucker
Men's individual road race	Tom Huelin; Jersey	Roberto Ledesma Estevez; Menorca	Tyler Hannay; Isle of Man
Men's team road race	Jersey; Ollie Cadin; Tom Huelin; Samuel Nisbet; Jack Rebours	Menorca; Aaron Genestar Sánchez; Roberto Ledesma Estevez; David Sintes Pons	Isle of Man; Tyler Hannay; Mark Horsthuis; Niall Quiggin; Callum Salisbury; Ivan Sorby
Women's individual time trial	Olivia Lett; Gibraltar	Súsanna Skylv Sørensen; Faroe Islands	Nicola Valarino; Gibraltar
Women's team time trial	Gibraltar; Olivia Lett; Nicola Macedo; Nicola Valarino	Guernsey; Pippa Inderwick; Hannah Kennedy; Andrea Nightingale; Chloe Truffitt	not awarded
Women's individual criterium	Súsanna Skylv Sørensen; Faroe Islands	Hannah Kennedy; Guernsey	Pippa Inderwick; Guernsey
Women's team criterium	Guernsey; Helena Duguid; Pippa Inderwick; Hannah Kennedy; Andrea Nightingale; Chloe Truffitt	not awarded	not awarded
Women's individual road race	Pippa Inderwick; Guernsey	Olivia Lett; Gibraltar	shared silver
Women's individual road race	Pippa Inderwick; Guernsey	Súsanna Skylv Sørensen; Faroe Islands	shared silver
Women's team road race	Guernsey; Helena Duguid; Pippa Inderwick; Hannah Kennedy; Andrea Nightingale; Chloe Truffitt	not awarded	not awarded

=== Football ===
Event	Gold	Silver	Bronze
Men	Bermuda; Andrew Armstrong; Mason Christian; Amir Dill; Hayden Dill; Jace Donawa; Jorj Dublin; Camajé Easton-Smith; Chance-Carmine Eve; Coleridge Fubler Jr. Jakeem Jennings; Joshua Joseph; Sebastian Madeiros; Caleb McDowall; Keyni Mills; Brighton Morrison; La Zai Outerbridge; Zico Saltus-Seymour; Khari Sharrieff; Nathaniel Swan; Adrian Trott	Ynys Môn; Alex Boss; Caio Evans; Casey Gregg; Cai Griffith; David Jones; Mitchell Jones; Osian Jones; Richard Jones; Samuel Jones; Liam Morris; Cian Owen; Cai Powell-Roberts; Cai Roberts; Gerwyn Roberts; Jack Smith; Dylan Summers-Jones; Joshua Williams	Isle of Man; Chris Bass; Joseph Bergquist; Harry Best; Mark Blair; Tomas Brown; James Callister; Jason Charmer; Connor Clark; Karl Clark; Sean Doyle; Lee Gale; Jay Gandy; Sam Gelling; Frank Jones; Joao Marques; Morgan Naylor; Daniel Pickering; Dan Simpson; Stewart Smith; Matthew Woods
Women	Bermuda; Khyla Brangman; K'shaela Burch-Waldron; Marli Butterfield; Emily Cabral; Victoria Davis; Keunna Dill; Ché Chulaé Dowling; Trinae Edwards; Taznae Fubler; Koa Goodchild; Symira Lowe-Darrell; Jaden Masters; Jya Ratteray-Smith; Janiya Sealey; Jahde Simmons; Jahni Simmons; Soany Trott; Za'Khari Turner; Danni Watson; Zemira Webb	Isle of Man; Cailtin Beaty; Rosabel Cardy; Rebecca Cole; Rebecca Corkish; Lisa Costain; Milly Dawson; Louise Gibbins; Kayleigh Greggor; Shannon Groves; Megan Kelly; Tia Lisy; Stevie Mallon; Sarah O'Reilly; Ruby Palmer; Anna Shaw; Lydia Shaw; Holly Stephen; Holly Sumner; Chloe Teare; Philippa Wallis	Western Isles; Krysta Bray; Natalie Campbell; Anne-Louise Mackenzie; Rosa Mackenzie; Katie Mackinnon; Kirsty Maclean; Beth Macleod; Hannah Macleod; Jessica Macleod; Sinead Macleod; Shana Macphail; Emma Macsween; Grace Martin; Lisa Mason; Kyla McMurdo; Amanda Nicolson; Catriona O'Carroll; Eleanor Smith; Maimie Zimmerman

=== Golf ===
Event	Gold	Silver	Bronze
Men's individual	Daryl Callister; Isle of Man	Robert Noon; Isle of Man	Nathaniel Riddett; Isle of Wight
Men's team	Isle of Man; Daryl Callister; Liam Cowin; Christopher Kneen; Robert Noon	Orkney; Lee Findlay; Steven Rendall; Michael Schinkel; Steven Walls	Isle of Wight; George Foreman; Christopher Hayward; Conner Knight; Nathaniel Riddett
Women's individual	Sophie Beardsall; Isle of Wight	Emma Lindman; Åland	Sienna Mosquera; Bermuda
Women's team	Isle of Wight; Sophie Beardsall; Lucy Burke; Caroline Johnson; Sammi Keen	Gotland; Lina Billing; Lina Svegsjö; Christella Winzell	Orkney; Michelle Clouston; Shona Croy; Shona Slater; Nicola Sutherland

=== Gymnastics ===
FIG

Event	Gold	Silver	Bronze
Men's individual all-around	Karthik Adapa; Cayman Islands	Harry Eyres; Isle of Man	Bjarki Johannesen; Faroe Islands
Men's individual all-around	Karthik Adapa; Cayman Islands	Harry Eyres; Isle of Man	Fraser McKenna; Isle of Man
Men's floor	Karthik Adapa; Cayman Islands	Torleivur Christiansen; Faroe Islands	Harry Eyres; Isle of Man
Men's horizontal bar	Karthik Adapa; Cayman Islands	Harry Eyres; Isle of Man	Bjarki Johannesen; Faroe Islands
Men's parallel bars	Karthik Adapa; Cayman Islands	Fraser McKenna; Isle of Man	Bjarti Skylv Hansen; Faroe Islands
Men's pommel horse	Rókur Sumberg Vestergaard; Faroe Islands	Justin Spencer; Cayman Islands	Bjarki Í Jákupstovu; Faroe Islands
Men's rings	Karthik Adapa; Cayman Islands	Torleivur Christiansen; Faroe Islands	shared silver
Men's rings	Karthik Adapa; Cayman Islands	Bjarki Johannesen; Faroe Islands	shared silver
Men's vault	Torleivur Christiansen; Faroe Islands	Bjarki Johannesen; Faroe Islands	Karthik Adapa; Cayman Islands
Women's individual all-around	Mia Højgaard; Faroe Islands	shared gold	Aine Matthews; Isle of Man
Women's individual all-around	Amara Brogan; Isle of Man	shared gold	Aine Matthews; Isle of Man
Women's balance beam	Amara Brogan; Isle of Man	Lacey Jackson; Isle of Man	Stina Ekstrand; Åland
Women's floor	Marin Danielsen; Faroe Islands	Mia Højgaard; Faroe Islands	Aine Matthews; Isle of Man
Women's uneven bars	Mia Højgaard; Faroe Islands	Edit Virta; Åland	Aine Matthews; Isle of Man
Women's vault	Edit Virta; Åland	shared gold	Elise Pease; Isle of Man
Women's vault	Mia Højgaard; Faroe Islands	shared gold	Elise Pease; Isle of Man

SET

Event	Gold	Silver	Bronze
Men's floor	Rókur Sumberg Vestergaard; Faroe Islands	Harry Eyres; Isle of Man	Karthik Adapa; Cayman Islands
Men's horizontal bar	Harry Eyres; Isle of Man	Bjarki Johannesen; Faroe Islands	Karthik Adapa; Cayman Islands
Men's parallel bars	Karthik Adapa; Cayman Islands	Rókur Sumberg Vestergaard; Faroe Islands	Leon Martin; Isle of Man
Men's pommel horse	Rókur Sumberg Vestergaard; Faroe Islands	Karthik Adapa; Cayman Islands	Justin Spencer; Cayman Islands
Men's rings	Torleivur Christiansen; Faroe Islands	Karthik Adapa; Cayman Islands	shared silver
Men's rings	Torleivur Christiansen; Faroe Islands	Ewan McIlraith; Isle of Man	shared silver
Men's vault	Ari Poulsen; Faroe Islands	Fraser McKenna; Isle of Man	Harry Eyres; Isle of Man
Women's balance beam	Mia Højgaard; Faroe Islands	Edit Virta; Åland	Calla Woodcock; Ynys Môn
Women's floor	Marin Danielsen; Faroe Islands	Oddvør Alberta Kimsdóttir; Faroe Islands	Mia Højgaard; Faroe Islands
Women's uneven bars	Stina Ekstrand; Åland	Edit Virta; Åland	Aine Matthews; Isle of Man
Women's uneven bars	Stina Ekstrand; Åland	Edit Virta; Åland	Elise Pease; Isle of Man
Women's vault	Mia Højgaard; Faroe Islands	Amara Brogan; Isle of Man	Edit Virta; Åland
Women's vault	Mia Højgaard; Faroe Islands	Amara Brogan; Isle of Man	Ronja Johannesen; Faroe Islands

Team

Event	Gold	Silver	Bronze
Men's 2-piece team	Faroe Islands; Torleivur Christiansen; Bjarti Skylv Hansen; Bjarki Í Jákupstovu; Bjarki Johannesen; Ari Poulsen; Rókur Sumberg Vestergaard	not awarded	not awarded
Women's 4-piece team	Faroe Islands; Marin Danielsen; Maite Lív Neves Ellendersen; Mia Højgaard; Anna Sofia Højsted; Ronja Johannesen; Oddvør Alberta Kimsdóttir	Isle of Man; Lily Bosendorfer; Amara Brogan; Phoebe Christian; Lacey Jackson; Aine Matthews; Elise Pease	Åland Islands; Stina Ekstrand; Nova Lundsten; Cornelia Scott; Kajsa Sjöström; Olivia Ståhlberg; Edit Virta

=== Lawn bowls ===
Event	Gold	Silver	Bronze
Men's singles	Michael Rive; Jersey	Neil Anderson; Orkney	Andy Walterson; Shetland
Men's pairs	Orkney; Mark Causer; George Rendall	Shetland; Alexander Elphinstone; Gilbert Pottinger	Jersey; Josh Band; Kevin Le Long
Men's triples	Orkney; Barry Bruce; Greg Rendall; Kevin Watters	Jersey; Josh Band; Kevin Le Long; Michael Rive	Shetland; Ian Leiper; Eric Muir; Thomas Terris
Women's singles	Rosemary Ogier; Guernsey	Isla Rendall; Orkney	Daphne Arthur-Almond; Falkland Islands
Women's pairs	Guernsey; Rosemary Ogier; Julie Williams	Orkney; Elizabeth McConnachie; Ruth Rendall	Shetland; Anne Barron; Caroline Smith

=== Squash ===
Event	Gold	Silver	Bronze
Men's singles	Finlay Scott; Orkney	Taylor Carrick; Bermuda	Ivan Flores Vela; Gibraltar
Women's singles	Jade Pitcairn; Cayman Islands	Emma Turnbull; Cayman Islands	Michaela Janse Van Rensburg; Cayman Islands
Men's doubles	Cayman Islands; Julian Jervis; Cameron Stafford	Jersey; Matthew Boote; Antony Harkin	Orkney; Adam Bews; Adam Stanger
Women's doubles	Cayman Islands; Jade Pitcairn; Emma Turnbull	Jersey; Beth Garton; Amelie Turpin	Orkney; Aimee Drever; Jane Thomson
Mixed doubles	Cayman Islands; Jade Pitcairn; Cameron Stafford	Orkney; Aimee Drever; Finlay Scott	Jersey; Amelie Turpin; William Turpin
Mixed team	Cayman Islands; Michaela Janse Van Rensburg; Jace Jervis; Julian Jervis; Jade Pitcairn; Cameron Stafford; Emma Turnbull	Orkney; Adam Bews; Aimee Drever; Andrew Moar; Dylan Scott; Finlay Scott; Adam Stanger; Betty Stanger; Jane Thomson; Amy Walker	Jersey; Matthew Boote; Beth Garton; Antony Harkin; Amelie Turpin; Susan Turpin; William Turpin

=== Triathlon ===
Event	Gold	Silver	Bronze
Men's individual	Thomas Atkinson; Jersey	Albert Askengren; Gotland	Bobby Oag; Orkney
Men's team	Jersey; Thomas Atkinson; Peter Holmes; Dale Quenault; Wayne Quenault; Dirk Swart; Mark Syvret	Gibraltar; Matthew Borg; Jason Galton; Andrew Gordon; Philip Macedo; Robert Matto; Nicolas Podesta; Julian Vinales; Charles Walker; Christopher Walker	Guernsey; Dan Armsden; David Fairbrother; David Mosley; Christopher Norman; Ove Svejstrup; Ethan Woodhead
Women's individual	Claire Rendall; Orkney	Hannah Kennedy; Guernsey	Clara Isaac; Isle of Man
Women's team	Guernsey; Amy Critchlow; Hannah Kennedy; Lindsay Sword; Chloe Truffitt	Shetland; Wendy Hatrick; Lynsey Henderson; Emma Leask; Louise Parr	Orkney; Jo Donaldson; Rebecca Learmonth; Alison Leitch; Caron Oag; Claire Rendall
