= 2023 Island Games =

International multi-sport event

- Host: Guernsey
- Teams: 24 islands
- Athletes: 2,194
- Events: 14 sports
- Opening: 8 July 2023
- Closing: 14 July 2023
- Main venue: Footes Lane
- Website: https://guernsey2023.gg/

The XIX Island Games (also known as the 2023 NatWest Island Games for sponsorship reasons) were to have been held in Guernsey in 2021; however, due to the COVID-19 pandemic, the Games were postponed. This occasion was the third time that the island hosted the Games, the others being in 1987, and 2003.

Rescheduled, the week-long event took place from 8 to 14 July 2023 and welcomed around 2,500 competitors and officials from 24 islands to take part in 14 sports.

== Host ==
The Faroe Islands were initially chosen to host the games but pulled out of doing so in early 2015. In July 2016 the Island Games AGM unanimously decided to award the games to Guernsey.

The Guernsey organising committee chair was Dame Mary Perkins, supported by Peter Vidamour as sports director and Ian Damarell as Finance Director. The International Island Games Association (IIGA) advisor was Eric Legg. The mascot of the Games was an anthropomorphic puffin character named Jet (short for Jethou), which was decided by a children-only vote.

== Opening of games ==
An opening ceremony was held on the seafront of St Peter Port on 8 July led by Gibraltar, where thousands turned out to greet the 24 teams taking part in the week's competitions. Each participating nation brought a sample of water from their own island to add to water from the previous games, in a fountain in a symbolic gesture, to announce the opening of the games, a tradition started at the Åland 1991 games.

== Volunteers ==
The games are only possible with the help of volunteers.

Over 1,200 Guernsey volunteers had been trained to provide assistance at the various games venues. In addition, the Isle of Man had lent seven Police officers and Gibraltar and Australia, St John Ambulance staff to supplement the Guernsey facilities, with additional medical vehicles borrowed from the UK for the week.

== Participating islands ==
24 island entities of the IIGA, from Europe, the South Atlantic, and the Caribbean competed in the Games.

- Åland Islands
- Alderney
- Bermuda
- Cayman Islands
- Falkland Islands
- Faroe Islands
- Frøya
- Gibraltar
- Gotland
- Gozo
- Greenland
- Guernsey (Host)
- Hitra
- Isle of Man
- Isle of Wight
- Jersey
- Menorca
- Orkney
- Saaremaa
- Saint Helena
- Sark
- Shetland Islands
- (Outer Hebrides) Western Isles
- (Anglesey) Ynys Môn

== Sports ==
The sports selection followed the same itinerary as the 2019 Island Games. However the included sports had changed.

Numbers in parentheses indicate the number of medal events contested in each sport.

- Archery (14)
- Athletics (42)
- Badminton (6)
- Basketball (2)
- Bowls (3)
- Cycling (20)
  - Mountain biking (8)
  - Road (12)
- Football (2)
- Golf (4)
- Sailing (3)
- Shooting (43)
- Swimming (45)
- Table tennis (6)
- Tennis (7)
- Triathlon (5)

== Medal table ==
* Host nation (Guernsey)

2023 Island Games Medals
Rank	Nation	Gold	Silver	Bronze	Total
1	Guernsey (GUE)*	54	49	42	145
2	Jersey (JEY)	41	41	44	126
3	Isle of Man (IOM)	20	16	27	63
4	Faroe Islands (FRO)	17	21	26	64
5	Isle of Wight (IOW)	15	15	8	38
6	Gotland	11	5	8	24
7	Saaremaa	10	8	3	21
8	Menorca	7	8	4	19
9	Ynys Môn	6	7	5	18
10	Cayman Islands (CAY)	5	4	9	18
11	Åland (ALA)	4	4	6	14
12	Gibraltar (GIB)	3	3	10	16
13	Bermuda (BER)	2	2	6	10
14	Greenland (GRL)	2	1	3	6
15	Falkland Islands (FLK)	1	2	1	4
15	Gozo	1	2	1	4
17	Western Isles	0	4	1	5
18	Shetland (SHE)	0	3	4	7
19	Hitra	0	1	5	6
20	Orkney	0	1	1	2
21	Sark	0	1	0	1
Totals (21 entries)		199	198	214	611

== Venues ==
Sport	Venue
Archery	Rovers AC - Port Soif, Vale
Athletics	Footes Lane, St Peter Port
Badminton	Badminton Hall, St Peter Port
Basketball	Beau Sejour, St Peter Port and St Sampson's High School, St Sampson's
Bowls	Indoor Bowls Stadium, Vale
Cycling	Styx Community Centre, Saint Pierre du Bois
Football	Corbet Field, Northfield and The Track, St Sampson's, Blanches Pierre Lane, St Martin's, College Field and Footes Lane, St Peter Port
Golf	L'Ancresse Golf Course, Vale
Sailing	Guernsey Yacht Club, St Peter Port
Shooting	Aztech Centre, Portinfer, Fort Le Marchant and Chouet, Vale and Mont Herault, Saint Pierre du Bois
Swimming	Beau Sejour, St Peter Port
Table Tennis	Guernsey Table Tennis Centre, Vale
Tennis	Guernsey Tennis Centre, St Sampson's
Triathlon	St Peter Port Seafront and Rocquaine, St Peter's
