= Gibraltar at the 2026 European Athletics Championships =

- Flag of Gibraltar
- WA code: GIB

in Birmingham, United Kingdom 10–16 August 2026
- Competitors: 1 (1 woman)
- Medals: Gold 0 Silver 0 Bronze 0 Total 0

European Athletics Championships appearances
- 1966; 1969; 1971; 1974; 1978; 1982; 1986; 1990–1994; 1998; 2002; 2006; 2010; 2012; 2014; 2016; 2018; 2022; 2024; 2026

Gibraltar competed at the 2026 European Athletics Championships in Birmingham, United Kingdom from 10–16 August 2026.

== Results ==
Gibraltar entered the following athletes.

Key

- Q = Qualified for the next round
- q = Qualified for the next round as a fastest loser or, in field events, by position without achieving the qualifying target
- NR = National record
- PB = Personal best
- SB = Season best
- N/A = Round not applicable for the event

Track and road events

Athlete	Event	Heat		Semifinal		Final	
Athlete	Event	Result	Rank	Result	Rank	Result	Rank
Charlotte Peat	Women's 100 m	12.71	23	Did not advance			
