= Gibraltar at the 2018 European Athletics Championships =

- WA code: GIB
- National federation: GAAA
- Website: www.gaaa.gi

in Berlin
- Competitors: 3

European Athletics Championships appearances
- 1966; 1969; 1971; 1974; 1978; 1982; 1986; 1990–1994; 1998; 2002; 2006; 2010; 2012; 2014; 2016; 2018; 2022; 2024

Gibraltar competed at the 2018 European Athletics Championships in Berlin, Germany, from 6–12 August 2018. The following three athletes were selected to compete by the Gibraltar Amateur Athletic Association:

Athletes	Event	Heats		Semifinal		Final	
Athletes	Event	Result	Rank	Result	Rank	Result	Rank
Jessy Franco	400 metres	48.12 (PB)	29	did not advance			
Harvey Dixon	1500 metres	3:54.70	32	did not advance			
Arnold Rogers	Marathon	—N/a				2:32:41 (PB)	57
