= Gibraltar at the 2016 European Athletics Championships =

- WA code: GIB
- National federation: GAAA
- Website: www.gaaa.gi

in Amsterdam
- Competitors: 2 (1 man and 1 woman) in 2 events
- Medals: Gold 0 Silver 0 Bronze 0 Total 0

European Athletics Championships appearances
- 1966; 1969; 1971; 1974; 1978; 1982; 1986; 1990–1994; 1998; 2002; 2006; 2010; 2012; 2014; 2016; 2018; 2022; 2024

Gibraltar competed at the 2016 European Athletics Championships in Amsterdam, Netherlands, between 6 and 10 July 2016.

== Results ==
Men

Track & road events

Athlete	Event	Heat		Semifinal		Final	
Athlete	Event	Result	Rank	Result	Rank	Result	Rank
Harvey Dixon	1500 m	3:51.82	35	—N/a		did not advance	

Women

Track & road events

Athlete	Event	Heat		Semifinal		Final	
Athlete	Event	Result	Rank	Result	Rank	Result	Rank
Zyanne Hook	200 m	26.78	28	did not advance			
