= List of Gibraltarian records in athletics =

The following are the national records in athletics in Gibraltar maintained by Gibraltar Athletics, formerly Gibraltar Amateur Athletics Association.

== Outdoor ==
Key to tables: Awaiting ratification Record not kept by GAAA Not ratified or later rescinded by GAAA

=== Men ===
Event	Record	Athlete	Date	Meet	Place	Ref.
100 m	10.89 (−0.5 m/s)	Jessy Franco	12 June 2019	GAAA Time Trial	Gibraltar	
100 m	10.6 h (+1.4 m/s)	Jerai Torres	23 July 2012	Gibraltarian Trials	Gibraltar	
200 m	21.31 (+0.9 m/s)	Jessy Franco	24 June 2019	GAAA Time Trials	Gibraltar	
200 m	21.20 A (+0.9 m/s)	Jessy Franco	13 February 2016		Pretoria, South Africa	
400 m	47.41	Jessy Franco	1 October 2019	World Championships	Doha, Qatar	
800 m	1:51.17	John Chappory	30 June 1984		Barcelona, Spain	
800 m	1:50.58 (Note: not ratified by GAAA but recognized by World Athletics)	Harvey Dixon	16 July 2024		Watford, United Kingdom	
1500 m	3:43.84	Harvey Dixon	14 April 2018	Commonwealth Games	Gold Coast, Australia	
Mile	4:08.54	Harvey Dixon	10 April 2015	Providence College Friar Invitational	Providence, United States	
3000 m	8:16.45	Harvey Dixon	7 July 2018	BMC Grand Prix	Eltham, United Kingdom	
5000 m	14:18.4 h (Note: by GAAA source, automatic timing by World Athletics source)	John Charvetto	31 August 1978	European Championships	Prague, Czechoslovakia	
5 km (road)	17:30+	Arnold Rogers	20 February 2022	Seville Marathon	Seville, Spain	
10,000 m	30:59.87	Michael Sánchez	10 July 2005	Island Games	Lerwick, United Kingdom	
10 km (road)	34:51+	Arnold Rogers	20 February 2022	Seville Marathon	Seville, Spain	
15 km (road)	52:10+	Arnold Rogers	20 February 2022	Seville Marathon	Seville, Spain	
20 km (road)	1:09:38+	Arnold Rogers	20 February 2022	Seville Marathon	Seville, Spain	
Half marathon	1:07:31	John Chappory	1 September 1982		Málaga, Spain	
25 km (road)	1:27:06+	Arnold Rogers	20 February 2022	Seville Marathon	Seville, Spain	
30 km (road)	1:44:24+	Arnold Rogers	20 February 2022	Seville Marathon	Seville, Spain	
Marathon	2:28:08	Arnold Rogers	20 February 2022	Seville Marathon	Seville, Spain	
110 m hurdles	17.65 (±0.0 m/s) (Note: record set during decathlon competition)	Benjamin Power	6 May 2023	Centennial Conference Championships	Collegeville, United States	
400 m hurdles	55.69	Oscar Heaney Brufal	14 April 2018		Bromley, United Kingdom	
3000 m steeplechase	9:27.79	Harvey Dixon	2 August 2019		Birmingham, United Kingdom	
High jump	1.82 m	Antonio Segovia	16 July 1983		Gibraltar	
Pole vault	3.13 m (Note: record set during decathlon competition)	Benjamin Power	7 May 2023		Collegeville, United States	
Long jump	6.59 m (+0.8 m/s)	Rhys Byrne	8 July 2025		Gibraltar	
Triple jump	12.91 m (−1.4 m/s)	Rhys Byrne	31 May 2025		Malaga, Spain	
Shot put	12.30 m	Stanley Olivero	21 June 1986		Gibraltar	
Discus throw	34.64 m	Stanley Olivero	19 August 1982		Gibraltar	
Discus throw	35.34 m (Note: not ratified by GAAA but recognized by World Athletics)	Stanley Olivero	1986			
Hammer throw						
Javelin throw	43.33 m	Benjamin Power	8 May 2022		Collegeville, United States	
Javelin throw	44.41 m	Benjamin Power	2 May 2021	Centennial Conference Championships	Allentown, United States	
Decathlon	4792 pts	Benjamin Power	6−7 May 2023	Centennial Conference Championships	Collegeville, United States	
Decathlon	100m / Long jump / Shot put / High jump / 400m / 110m H / Discus / Pole vault / Javelin / 1500m; 11.71 (+1.3 m/s) / 5.74 m (±0.0 m/s) / 10.96 m / 1.58 m / 56.77 / 17.65 (±0.0 m/s) / 29.95 m / 3.13 m / 38.02 m / 6:15.17					
20 km walk (road)						
50 km walk (road)						
4 × 100 m relay	42.04	Gibraltar; Joshua Montado; Craig Gill; Jerai Torres; Jessy Franco	12 July 2019		Gibraltar	
Swedish relay	2:02.53	Gibraltar; Sean Collado; Jessy Franco; Jerai Torres; Harvey Dixon	11 June 2016		Valletta, Malta	
4 × 400 m relay	3:20.29	Gibraltar; Lee Taylor; Dominic Carroll; Daryl Vassallo; Jonathon Lavers	3 July 2007	Island Games	Rhodes, Greece	

=== Women ===
Event	Record	Athlete	Date	Meet	Place	Ref.
100 m	12.55 (−0.8 m/s)	Sharon Mifsud	24 June 1991	Island Games	Mariehamn, Åland Islands	
100 m	12.10 NWI	Sharon Mifsud	20 July 1991		Gibraltar	
200 m	25.55 (−0.7 m/s)	Sharon Mifsud	27 June 1991	Island Games	Mariehamn, Åland Islands	
200 m	25.50 NWI	Sharon Mifsud	20 July 1991		Gibraltar	
400 m	57.40 (Note: not recognized by World Athletics)	Sharon Mifsud	16 July 1995	Island Games	Gibraltar	
400 m	57.66 (Note: recognized by World Athletics)	Sharon Mifsud	25 June 1991	Island Games	Mariehamn, Åland Islands	
800 m	2:15.56	Kim Baglietto	3 July 2009	Island Games	Mariehamn, Åland Islands	
1500 m	4:47.0 h	Kim Baglietto	3 October 2008	GAAA Time Trial	Gibraltar	
3000 m	10:18.7 h	Emma Montiel	21 June 2014		Walton, United Kingdom	
5000 m	18:03.98	Kim Baglietto	3 July 2015	Island Games	Saint Clement, Jersey	
5 km (road)	19:29+	Kim Baglietto	28 January 2024	Seville Half Marathon	Seville, Spain	
10,000 m	36:23.35	Kim Baglietto	2 July 2015	Island Games	Saint Clement, Jersey	
10 km (road)	38:03+	Kim Baglietto	28 January 2024	Seville Half Marathon	Seville, Spain	
15 km (road)	56:55+	Kim Baglietto	28 January 2024	Seville Half Marathon	Seville, Spain	
Half marathon	1:20:13 (Note: Gun time by official result source and World Athletics source; 1:19:43 chip time by Gibraltar Athletics source)	Kim Baglietto	28 January 2024	Seville Half Marathon	Seville, Spain	
25 km (road)	1:42:10+	Kim Baglietto	18 February 2024	Seville Marathon	Seville, Spain	
30 km (road)	2:04:31+	Kim Baglietto	18 February 2024	Seville Marathon	Seville, Spain	
Marathon	3:00:03 (Note: Gun time by official result source and World Athletics source; 2:59:50 chip time by Gibraltar Athletics source)	Kim Baglietto	18 February 2024	Seville Marathon	Seville, Spain	
100 m hurdles	19.68 NWI (Note: not ratified by GAAA but recognized by World Athletics)	Bernice Tighe	18 July 1995		Gibraltar	
400 m hurdles						
3000 m steeplechase						
High jump	1.42 m	Caroline Tante	20 July 1991		Gibraltar	
Pole vault						
Long jump	4.53 m NWI	Alison Cano	10 June 1992		Gibraltar	
Triple jump	9.81 m NWI (Note: not ratified by GAAA but recognized by World Athletics)	Kaia Kaemmerlen	10 June 2017		Reading, United Kingdom	
Shot put	8.50 m	Nicole Barker	17 July 1992		Gibraltar	
Discus throw	21.60 m	Nicole Barker	17 July 1992		Gibraltar	
Hammer throw						
Javelin throw						
Heptathlon						
Heptathlon	100m H / High jump / Shot put / 200m / Long jump / Javelin / 800m					
20 km walk (road)						
4 × 100 m relay	49.3 h (Note: by World Athletics source, 49.21 by federation source)	Gibraltar; Denise Russo; Gabriella Falero; Lizanne Zammitt; Sharron Celecia	20 July 1995	Island Games	Gibraltar	
4 × 400 m relay	4:14.55 (Note: by official result source; 4:14.50 by GAAA source)	Gibraltar; Luan White; Gina Morello; Suzanne Romero; Sharon Mifsud	27 June 1991	Island Games	Mariehamn, Åland Islands	
4 × 400 m relay	4:09.90 (Note: not ratified by GAAA but recognized by World Athletics)	Gibraltar	12 July 2019		Gibraltar	

== Indoor ==
=== Men ===
Event	Record	Athlete	Date	Meet	Place	Ref.
60 m	7.01	Jerai Torres	23 February 2020		Antequera, Spain	
200 m	22.19	Jerai Torres	11 February 2018	Catalan Club Championships	Sabadell, Spain	
300 m	35.17	Jerai Torres	10 December 2017		Sabadell, Spain	
400 m	49.97	Jerai Torres	21 January 2018	Time Trials	Sabadell, Spain	
500 m	1:07.56	Jerai Torres	17 December 2017	Control Absolut	Sabadell, Spain	
800 m	1:52.59	Harvey Dixon	10 February 2018	David Hemery Invitational	Boston, United States	
1500 m	3:49.89	Harvey Dixon	3 March 2018	World Championships	Birmingham, United Kingdom	
Mile	4:03.34	Harvey Dixon	25 February 2018	BU Last Chance Meet	Boston, United States	
3000 m	8:00.87	Harvey Dixon	26 January 2019	New Balance Indoor Grand Prix	Boston, United States	
60 m hurdles	9.49 (Note: record set during heptathlon competition)	Benjamin Power	26 February 2023	Centennial Conference Championships	Lancaster, United States	
High jump	1.61 m (Note: record set during heptathlon competition)	Benjamin Power	25 February 2023	Centennial Conference Championships	Lancaster, United States	
Pole vault	3.07 m	Benjamin Power	8 December 2023	Fast Times at Lehigh University	Bethlehem, United States	
Long jump	5.66 m	Rhys Byrne	11 February 2023		Antequera, Spain	
Triple jump						
Shot put	12.25 m (Note: record set during heptathlon competition)	Benjamin Power	25 February 2023	Centennial Conference Championships	Lancaster, United States	
Heptathlon	3490 pts	Benjamin Power	23–24 February 2024	Middle Atlantic Conference Championships	Reading, United States	
Heptathlon	60m / Long jump / Shot put / High jump / 60m H / Pole vault / 1000m; 7.60 / 5.26 m / 11.45 m / 1.56 m / 10.01 / 2.90 m / 3:18.17					
5000 m walk						
4 × 400 m relay						

=== Women ===
Event	Record	Athlete	Date	Meet	Place	Ref.
60 m	8.18	Norcady Reyes	14 January 2023		Antequera, Spain	
200 m	26.65	Norcady Reyes	11 February 2023		Antequera, Spain	
400 m	1:00.23	Norcady Reyes	30 December 2023		Antequera, Spain	
800 m	2:22.46 (Note: by World Athletics source; 2:22.50 by GAAA source)	Kim Baglietto	6 February 2013	Inter Varsity Meeting	Birmingham, United Kingdom	
1500 m	4:48.76	Katherine Rogers	24 February 2024	Andalusian U20 Club Championships	Antequera, Spain	
3000 m	11:13.69 (Note: not ratified by GAAA but recognized by World Athletics)	Emma Jane Montiel	18 March 2012		London, United Kingdom	
60 m hurdles						
High jump						
Pole vault						
Long jump						
Triple jump						
Shot put						
Pentathlon						
Pentathlon	60m H / High jump / Shot put / Long jump / 800m					
3000 m walk						
4 × 400 m relay						

== See also ==
- Sport in Gibraltar
