= Gibraltar at the 2018 European Championships =

- WA code: GIB

in (United Kingdom) Glasgow (Germany) Berlin 2 August 2018 – 12 August 2018
- Competitors: 3 in 1 sports
- Medals: Gold 0 Silver 0 Bronze 0 Total 0

European Championships appearances (overview)
- 2018; 2022

Gibraltar competed at the inaugural 7 sports 2018 European Championships from 2 to 12 August 2018.

== Competitors ==
Three competitors; Harvey Dixon, Jessy Franco and Arnold Rogers competed in athletics.

=== Athletics ===
Athletes	Event	Heats		Semifinal		Final	
Athletes	Event	Result	Rank	Result	Rank	Result	Rank
Jessy Franco	400 metres	48.12 (PB)	29	did not advance			
Harvey Dixon	1500 metres	3:54.70	32	did not advance			
Arnold Rogers	Marathon	—				2:32:41 (PB)	57
