= Gibraltar at the 2022 European Athletics Championships =

- WA code: GIB
- National federation: GAAA
- Website: www.gaaa.gi

in Munich
- Competitors: 2 (1 man and 1 woman) in 2 events
- Medals: Gold 0 Silver 0 Bronze 0 Total 0

European Athletics Championships appearances
- 1966; 1969; 1971; 1974; 1978; 1982; 1986; 1990–1994; 1998; 2002; 2006; 2010; 2012; 2014; 2016; 2018; 2022; 2024

Gibraltar competed at the 2022 European Athletics Championships in Munich, Germany, from 15–21 August 2022.

== Results ==
The following two athletes were selected to compete by the Gibraltar Amateur Athletic Association:

Athletes	Event	Heats		Semifinal		Final	
Athletes	Event	Result	Rank	Result	Rank	Result	Rank
Jerai Torres	Men's 200 metres	22.70	8	did not advance			
Norcady Reyes	Women's 400 metres	59.59	8	did not advance			

== See also ==
- Gibraltar at the 2022 European Championships
