= Gibraltar at the 2009 World Championships in Athletics =

- WA code: GIB
- National federation: Gibraltar Amateur Athletic Association
- Website: www.gaaa.gi

in Berlin
- Competitors: 1
- Medals: Gold 0 Silver 0 Bronze 0 Total 0

World Championships in Athletics appearances
- 1983; 1987; 1991; 1993; 1995; 1997; 1999; 2001; 2003; 2005; 2007; 2009; 2011; 2013; 2015; 2017; 2019; 2022; 2023; 2025

Gibraltar competed at the 2009 World Championships in Athletics from 15 to 23 August in Berlin.

The only participant, Dominic Carroll, suffered an injury to his thigh immediately after the start of his 100-metre heat; as such, he did not complete the race.

== Team selection ==
Track and road events

| Event | Athletes | |
| Event | Men | Women |
|---|---|---|
| 100 metres | Dominic Carroll | |

== Results ==
=== Men ===
Track and road events

| Event | Athletes | Heats | | Quarterfinal | | Semifinal | | Final | |
| Event | Athletes | Result | Rank | Result | Rank | Result | Rank | Result | Rank |
|---|---|---|---|---|---|---|---|---|---|
| 100 m | Dominic Carroll | DNF | | did not advance | | | | | |
