= Gibraltar at the 2022 World Athletics Championships =

Gibraltar at the 2022 World Championships in Athletics
- Flag of Gibraltar
- WA code: GIB

in Eugene, Oregon, United States July 15, 2022 – July 24, 2022
- Competitors: 1 (1 man and 0 women)

World Championships in Athletics appearances
- 1983; 1987; 1991; 1993; 1995; 1997; 1999; 2001; 2003; 2005; 2007; 2009; 2011; 2013; 2015; 2017; 2019; 2022; 2023; 2025

Gibraltar competed at the 2022 World Athletics Championships in Eugene, United States, from 15 to 24 July 2022.

== Results ==
Gibraltar entered 1 athlete.

=== Men ===
Track and road events

Athlete	Event	Preliminary		Heat		Semi-final		Final	
Athlete	Event	Result	Rank	Result	Rank	Result	Rank	Result	Rank
Craig Gill	100 metres	11.24 SB	15	Did not advance					
