= Athletics at the 2011 Island Games =

- Dates: 26 June – 1 July
- Host city: Sandown, Isle of Wight
- Venue: Fairway Sports Complex
- Level: Senior
- Events: 40
- Participation: 25 nations

Athletics competitions at the 2011 Island Games in the Isle of Wight was held from June 26 to July 1 at the Fairway Sports Complex. The half marathon event was held on a double-loop circuit through the surrounding area.

== Events ==
=== Medal table ===
Rank	Nation	Gold	Silver	Bronze	Total
1	Guernsey	9	4	0	13
2	Isle of Man	7	7	2	16
3	Isle of Wight	7	5	9	21
4	Jersey	6	3	3	12
5	Åland	4	3	3	10
6	Cayman Islands	4	3	2	9
7	Saare County	1	3	3	7
8	Western Isles	1	1	2	4
9	Menorca	1	0	1	2
9	Shetland	1	0	1	2
11	Gotland	0	4	7	11
12	Bermuda	0	3	5	8
13	Faroe Islands	0	2	3	5
14	Hitra Municipality	0	1	1	2
15	Anglesey	0	1	0	1
15	Rhodes	0	1	0	1
Totals (16 entries)		41	41	42	124

=== Men ===
Event	Gold		Silver		Bronze	
100 metres	Robert Ibeh (CAY)	10.80	Mats Boman (ALA)	10.82	Rhymiech Adolphus (CAY)	10.94
200 metres	Mats Boman (ALA)	21.60	Robert Ibeh (CAY)	21.83	Jaryd Robinson (Isle of Wight)	21.92
400 metres	Tom Druce (GGY)	46.71	Junior Hines (CAY)	49.20	Mattias Sunneborn (Gotland)	49.32
800 metres	Joseph Wade (Isle of Wight)	1:51.53	Donald Macleod (Western Isles)	1:52.60	Elliott Dorey (Jersey)	1:55.34
1500 metres	Keith Gerrard (IOM)	3:48.45	Joseph Wade (Isle of Wight)	3:53.54	Andre Kahlström (Gotland)	4:02.64
5000 metres	Keith Gerrard (IOM)	14:26.74	Thomas Wade (Isle of Wight)	15:11.98	Marnar Djurhuus (FRO)	15:56.88
10,000 metres	Thomas Wade (Isle of Wight)	30:53.59	Kevin Loundes (IOM)	31:21.54	Sean Trott (BER)	31:43.21
110 metres hurdles	Glenn Etherington (GGY)	14.96	Thomas Riley (IOM)	15.13	Raigo Saar (Saaremaa)	15.17
400 metres hurdles	James Forman (Isle of Wight)	50.41	Dale Garland (GGY)	51.16	Junior Hines (CAY)	51.99
3000 metres steeplechase	Thomas Wade (Isle of Wight)	9:17.67	Lee Garland (GGY)	9:39.18	William Newnham (Isle of Wight)	10:07.43
4×100 metres relay	Cayman Islands; Rhymiech Adolphus; Junior Hines; Robert Ibeh; Carl Morgan	41.79	Guernsey; Joshua Allaway; Tom Druce; Glenn Etherington; Dale Garland	41.80	Isle of Man; Ben Brand; Michael Haslett; Thomas Riley; Daniel Stewart-Clague	43.15
4×400 metres relay	Guernsey; Tom Druce; Dale Garland; Eben Marsh; Leo Rice	3:14.83	Isle of Man; Ben Brand; Ryan Fairclough; Michael Haslett; Thomas Riley	3:20.94	Western Isles; Stewart Chalmers; Murdo MacKenzie; Donald Macleod; Cameron Ross	3:22.53
Half-Marathon	Lee Merrien (GGY)	1:08:36	Kevin Loundes (IOM)	1:11:28	Sean Trott (BER)	1:12:22
Half-Marathon Team	Guernsey; Lee Merrien; Michael Wilesmith	6	Isle of Man; Ed Gumbley; Kevin Loundes	8	Bermuda; Stephen Allen; Sean Trott	14
High jump	Simon Phelan (Jersey)	2.10 m	Tarmo Saar (Saaremaa)	1.95 m	Øssur Debes Eiriksfoss (FRO); Erik Larsson (Gotland)	1.95 m
Long jump	Carl Morgan (CAY)	7.62 m	Dale Garland (GGY)	7.24 m	James Groocock (Isle of Wight)	7.20 m
Triple jump	Carl Morgan (CAY)	15.68 m	Mattias Sunneborn (Gotland)	14.75 m	Matthew Barton (Isle of Wight)	14.67 m
Shot put	Zane Duquemin (Jersey)	17.15 m	Genro Paas (Saaremaa)	15.35 m	Erik Larsson (Gotland)	14.39 m
Discus throw	Zane Duquemin (Jersey)	56.43 m	Erik Larsson (Gotland)	43.76 m	Genro Paas (Saaremaa)	43.59 m
Hammer throw	Andrew Frost (Isle of Wight)	70.61 m	Michael Letterlough (CAY)	60.14 m	Genro Paas (Saaremaa)	57.33 m
Javelin throw	Sander Suurhans (Saaremaa)	68.80 m	Jako Lindrop (Saaremaa)	55.59 m	Gustav Melen (Gotland)	55.32 m

=== Women ===
Event	Gold		Silver		Bronze	
100 metres	Kylie Robilliard (GGY)	11.94	Hanna Wiss (ALA)	12.21	Erica Nordqvist (ALA)	12.27
200 metres	Harriet Pryke (IOM)	24.76	Hanna Wiss (ALA)	25.12	Erica Nordqvist (ALA)	25.40
400 metres	Harriet Pryke (IOM)	55.60	Melissa Clarke (BER)	57.94	Camilla Olsson (Gotland)	58.74
800 metres	Emma Leask (Shetland Islands)	2:11.72	Claire Wilson (Jersey)	2:15.41	Claire Kiely (Isle of Wight)	2:16.46
1500 metres	Eilidh Mackenzie (Western Isles)	4:39.41	Claire Wilson (Jersey)	4:40.55	Claire Kiely (Isle of Wight)	4:41.22
5000 metre	Louise Perrio (GGY)	17:29.77	Bjørk Herup Olsen (FRO)	17:40.34	Rachael Franklin (IOM)	17:55.20
10,000 metres	Louise Perrio (GGY)	37:22.34	Bjørk Herup Olsen (FRO)	37:28.85	Turi Malme (Hitra)	37:30.72
100 metres hurdles	Hannah Riley (IOM)	14.68	Shianne Smith (BER)	15.14	Angela Lopez (Menorca)	15.41
400 metres hurdles	Angela Lopez (Menorca)	1:02.76	Shianne Smith (BER)	1:04.14	Sophie Twinam (Jersey)	1:04.58
4×100 metres relay	Guernsey; Emma Le Conte; Teresa Roberts; Kylie Robilliard; Caroline Kyle	48.25	Isle of Man; Sarah Halligan; Ciara McDonnell; Hannah Riley; Hannah Riley	48.82	Jersey; Helen Butler; Gemma Dawkins; Molly Jehan; Sophie Twinam	49.74
4×400 metres relay	Jersey; Gemma Dawkins; Hazel Le Cornu; Sophie Twinam; Claire Wilson	3:53.79	Isle of Man; Sarah Halligan; Ciara McDonnell; Harriet Pryke; Hannah Riley	3:54.79	Isle of Wight; Kim Murray; Holly Newton; Brogan Percy; Carla Plowden-Roberts	4:02.93
Half-Marathon	Johanna Kahlroth (ALA)	1:22:09	Turi Malme (Hitra)	1:22:52	Bjørk Herup Olsen (FRO)	1:24:35
Half-Marathon Team	Isle of Man; Gail Griffiths; Hannah Howard	11	Jersey; Jo Gorrod; Arlene Lewis	15	Isle of Wight; Laura Brackley; Mary Norman	23
High jump	Reagan Dee (IOM)	1.66 m	Anna Kleoniki Theodorou (Rhodes)	1.60 m	Suzanne Clifton (Isle of Wight)	1.60 m
Long jump	Hanna Wiss (ALA)	5.93 m	Kim Murray (Isle of Wight)	5.84 m	Shianne Smith (BER)	5.43 m
Triple jump	Hanna Wiss (ALA)	11.91 m	Ellinor Sundstrand (Gotland)	11.60 m	Erica Nordqvist (ALA)	10.95 m
Shot put	Shadine Duquemin (Jersey)	12.21 m	Lucy Rann (Isle of Wight)	11.58 m	Shianne Smith (BER)	11.00 m
Discus throw	Shadine Duquemin (Jersey)	45.39 m	Brea Leung (Anglesey)	32.71 m	Natalie Mumberson (Isle of Wight)	32.35 m
Hammer throw	Amy Church (Isle of Wight)	48.55 m	Annie Hansson (Gotland)	42.36 m	Cornelia Hansson (Gotland)	42.03 m
Javelin throw	Lucy Rann (Isle of Wight)	42.40 m	Helen Davis (Isle of Wight)	37.24 m	Inga Woods (Shetland Islands)	31.30 m
