= Claire Wilson =

Claire Wilson may refer to:

- Claire Wilson (athlete), Shetland athlete residing in Jersey
- Claire Wilson (politician), Washington State Senator
- Claire Wilson (University of Texas tower shooting), Texas shooting victim, wounded by Charles Whitman

== See also ==
- Clare Wilson (died 1917), English male footballer
