= Tyler Johnson =

Tyler Johnson may refer to:

- Tyler Johnson (baseball, born 1981), American baseball pitcher
- Tyler Johnson (baseball, born 1995), American baseball pitcher
- Tyler Johnson (basketball) (born 1992), American basketball player
- Tyler Johnson (ice hockey) (born 1990), American ice hockey player
- Tyler Johnson (musician) (active from 2012), American record producer and songwriter
- Tyler Johnson (American football) (born 1998), American football wide receiver
- Tyler Johnson (politician), member of the Indiana Senate
- Tyler Johnson (athlete), Nigerian athletic competitor
- Tyler Johnson, conspirator in the crimes of William Cottrell
- Tyler Johnson, protagonist of Shampoo Planet by Douglas Coupland

== See also ==
- Ty Johnson (disambiguation)
- Tyrone Johnson (disambiguation)
