= Athletics at the 2017 Island Games =

- Dates: June 24 – 30
- Host city: Gotland, Sweden
- Venue: Gutavallen, Visby
- Level: Senior

Athletics, for the 2017 Island Games, held at the Gutavallen, Visby, Gotland, Sweden in June 2017.

== Medal table ==
* Host nation (Gotland)

Rank	Nation	Gold	Silver	Bronze	Total
1	Isle of Man	7	5	8	20
2	Cayman Islands	6	4	2	12
3	Saare County	6	3	3	12
4	Guernsey	5	7	4	16
5	Gotland*	2	2	3	7
6	Isle of Wight	2	2	1	5
7	Gibraltar	2	1	4	7
7	Åland	2	1	4	7
9	Menorca	2	0	1	3
9	Orkney	2	0	1	3
11	Jersey	1	6	3	10
12	Faroe Islands	1	3	2	6
13	(Anglesey) Ynys Môn	1	2	3	6
14	Shetland	1	2	2	5
15	Western Isles	1	1	0	2
16	Bermuda	0	2	0	2
Totals (16 entries)		41	41	41	123

== Results ==
=== Men ===
Event	Gold		Silver		Bronze	
100 metres	Kemar Hyman (CAY)	10.25	Joshua Allaway (GGY)	10.55	Tyler Johnson (JEY)	10.60
200 metres	Jamal Walton (CAY)	21.55	Tyler Johnson (JEY)	22.02	Jerai Torres (GIB)	22.22
400 metres	Jamal Walton (CAY)	46.33	Sam Dawkins (JER)	48.62	Joseph Reid (IOM)	49.21
800 metres	Seumas Mackay (Shetland)	1:53.22	Tahj Lewis (CAY)	1:54.51	Cameron Payas (GIB)	1:54.60
1,500 metres	Harvey Dixon (GIB)	3:48.71	Samuel Maher (JEY)	3:55.78	Cameron Payas (GIB)	3:57.36
5,000 metres	Harvey Dixon (GIB)	14:46.47	Daniel Eckersley (IOW)	15:02.89	Rafel Quintana Villalonga (Minorca)	15:06.70
10,000 metres	Oliver Lockley (IOM)	30:37.46	Lee Merrien (GGY)	30:40.84	Daniel Antonsson (Gotland)	32:09.95
110 metres hurdles	Rauno Liitmäe (Saaremaa)	15.63	Peter Irving (JEY)	15.82	Gethin Hughes (Ynys Môn)	16.53
400 metres hurdles	Alastair Chalmers (GGY)	52.21	Sam Wallbridge (GGY)	52.28	Gethin Hughes (Ynys Môn)	54.97
3,000 metres Steeplechase	Daniel Eckersley (IOW)	9:28.05	Ed Mason (GGY)	9:43.53	Max Costley (IOM)	9:44.18
4×100 metres relay	Cayman Islands; Tyrell Cuffy; Kemar Hyman; Jeavhon Jackson; Tahj Lewis; Carl Morgan; Jamal Walton	41.46	Guernsey; Joshua Allaway; Harry Burns; Alastair Chalmers; Tom Druce; Teddy Gordon-le clerc Sam Wallbridge	42.22	Åland Islands; Victor Jansson; Samuel Nylund; Eric Sjölund; Emil Thölix; Joel Thölix	43.10
4×400 metres relay	Jersey; Sam Dawkins; Elliott Dorey; Peter Irving; Tyler Johnson; Stanley Livingston; Samuel Maher	3:23.29	Gibraltar; Abdullah Ahammad; Harvey Dixon; Jessy Franco; Craig Gill; Cameron Payas; Jerai Torres	3:29.47	Isle of Man; Brandon Atchison; Marcus Clague; Oliver Lockley; David Mullarkey; Rhys Owen; Joseph Reid	3:32.43
Half-Marathon	Lee Merrien (GGY)	1:06:45	Oliver Lockley (IOM)	1:07:48	Kevin Loundes (IOM)	1:10:59
Half-Marathon Team	Isle of Man; Andrew Barron; Oliver Lockley; Kevin Loundes	5	Saare County; Mairo Mändla; Kalev Õisnurm; Ando Õitspuu	11	Guernsey; David Emery; Carl Holden; Lee Merrien	14
High jump	Joshua Hewett (IOM)	2.01	Iwan Perry (Ynys Môn)	1.98	Jason Fox (JEY)	1.96
Long jump	Daniel Örevik (Gotland)	7.26	Carl Morgan (CAY)	7.11	Joel Thölix (ALA)	6.66
Triple jump	Carl Morgan (CAY)	14.69	Tórur Mortensen (FRO)	14.49	Andreas Henriksson (ALA)	13.87
Shot put	Genro Paas (Saaremaa)	15.48	Erik Larson (Gotland)	14.93	Connor Laverty (Ynys Môn)	12.59
Discus throw	Erik Larson (Gotland)	48.07	Connor Laverty (Ynys Môn)	45.17	Genro Paas (Saaremaa)	42.69
Javelin throw	Alexander Pascal (CAY)	73.39	Joe Harris (IOM)	68.57	Sander Suurhans (Saaremaa)	66.29
Hammer throw	Genro Paas (Saaremaa)	66.45	Andrew Frost (IOW)	65.39	Richard Bell (IOM)	49.52

=== Women ===
Event	Gold		Silver		Bronze	
100 metres	Hanna Wiss (ALA)	12.16	Taahira Butterfield (Bermuda)	12.58	Taylah Spence (Orkney)	12.68
200 metres	Hannah Lesbirel (GGY)	24.69	Taahira Butterfield (Bermuda)	24.92	Faye Cox (Shetland)	25.17
400 metres	Catherine Reid (IOM)	54.76	Shalysa Wray (CAY)	56.33	Eleanor Gallagher (GGY)	56.48
800 metres	Rebekka Fuglø (FRO)	2:14.40	Emma Leask (Shetland)	2:15.42	Gemma Dawkins (JEY)	2:16.25
1,500 metres	Anna Tait (Orkney)	4:24.15	Rachael Franklin (IOM)	4:25.45	Rebekka Fuglø (FRO)	4:30.20
5,000 metres	Anna Tait (Orkney)	16:45.06	Sarah Mercier (GGY)	16:58.93	Louise Perrio (GGY)	17:06.12
10,000 metres	Louise Perrio (GGY)	36:26.66	Marna Leila Vandsdal Egholm (FRO)	36:30.99	Hannah Howard (IOM)	36:52.79
100 metres hurdles	Angela Lopéz Marti (Minorca)	15.42	Amber Sibbarld (IOM)	15.44	Hannah Howard (IOM)	15.52
400 metres hurdles	Angela Lopéz Marti (Minorca)	1:03.50	Olivia Allbut (JEY)	1:04.42	Josefine Havdelin (Gotland)	1:06.39
4×100 metres relay	Isle of Man; Ashleigh Lachenicht; Bethan Pilley; Meghan Pilley; Hannah Riley; Amber Sibbald; Sara Watterson	48.72	Åland Islands; Lin Gustafsson; Eba Koskinen; Anni Nylund; Adina Renlund; Sofia Södergårdh; Hanna Wiss	49.34	Shetland; Faye Cox; Tamar Moncrieff; Molly Morgan; Mhia Mouat; Laura Newbold; Cara Steven	49.52
4×400 metres relay	Isle of Man; Rachel Franklin; Ashleigh Lachenicht; Meghan Pilley; Catherine Reid; Hannah Riley; Sara Watterson	3:54.51	Shetland; Faye Cox; Emma Leask; Tamar Moncrieff; Molly Morgan; Mhia Mouat; Cara Steven	3:55.85	Guernsey; Eleanor Gallagher; Amelia Elizabeth Lees; Hannah Lesbirel; Eliza Mason; Jasmine Norman; Rebecca Toll	3:56.54
Half-Marathon	Louise Perro (GGY)	1:19:06	Marna Leila Vandsdal Egholm (FRO)	1:19:18	Hannah Howard (IOM)	1:19:53
Half-Marathon Team	Isle of Man; Hannah Howard; Elissa Morris; Sarah Webster	8	Guernsey; Jenny James; Laura McCarthy; Louise Paerrio	11	Gibraltar; Kim Baglietto; Alison Edwards	20
High jump	Amelia-Jayne Jennings-McLaughlin (Ynys Môn)	1.70	Teele Treiel (Saaremaa)	1.70	Aijah Lewis (Saaremaa)	1.66
Long jump	Hanna Wiss (ALA)	5.92	Bethan Pilley (IOM)	5.56	Kärt Õunapuu (Saaremaa)	5.45
Triple jump	Heather Marie Mackinnon (Western Isles)	11.06	Kamela Monks (JEY)	11.02	Margit Weihe Fríðmundsdóttir (FRO)	10.83
Shot put	Linda Treiel (Saaremaa)	13.35	Eve Carrington (Western Isles)	10.99	Linn Gustafsson (ALA)	10.96
Discus throw	Linda Treiel (Saaremaa)	37.88	Airike Kapp (Saaremaa)	34.90	Brea Leung (Ynys Môn)	33.21
Javelin throw	Airike Kapp (Saaremaa)	41.70	Denaliz Thomas (CAY)	41.14	Aneta Seina (Gotland)	35.43
Hammer throw	Amy Clarke (IOW)	48.76	Annie Hansson (Gotland)	41.08	Wallis Henning (IOW)	40.47
