= Gibraltar at the 1983 World Championships in Athletics =

- Flag of Gibraltar
- WA code: GIB

in Helsinki, Finland August 7–14, 1983
- Competitors: 1 (1 man) in 2 events
- Medals: Gold 0 Silver 0 Bronze 0 Total 0

World Championships in Athletics appearances
- 1983; 1987; 1991; 1993; 1995; 1997; 1999; 2001; 2003; 2005; 2007; 2009; 2011; 2013; 2015; 2017; 2019; 2022; 2023; 2025

Gibraltar competed at the 1983 World Championships in Athletics in Helsinki, Finland, from August 7 to 14, 1983.

== Men ==
Track and road events

| Athlete | Event | Heat | | Semifinal | | Final | |
| Athlete | Event | Result | Rank | Result | Rank | Result | Rank |
|---|---|---|---|---|---|---|---|
| John Chappory | 800 metres | 1:52.30 | 49 | Did not advance | | | |
| John Chappory | 1500 metres | 3:56.92 | 46 | Did not advance | | | |
