= Gibraltar at the European Championships =

- IOC code: GIB
- NOC: Gibraltar Amateur Athletic Association
- Website: https://www.gibraltarathletics.com/
- Medals: Gold 0 Silver 0 Bronze 0 Total 0

European Championships appearances (overview)
- 2018; 2022

Gibraltar has competed in the European Championships since the inaugural event in 2018.

== Medal count ==
| Games | Athletes | Gold | Silver | Bronze | Total |
| (United Kingdom) / (Germany) 2018 Glasgow and Berlin (details) | 3 | 0 | 0 | 0 | 0 |
| (Germany) 2022 Munich (details) | 2 | 0 | 0 | 0 | 0 |
| Total | | 0 | 0 | 0 | 0 |

== See also ==
- Gibraltar at the Commonwealth Games
- Sport in Gibraltar
