= Craig Gill =

Craig Gill may refer to:

- Craig Gill (musician)
- Craig Gill (sprinter)
