= Gibraltar at the 2013 World Championships in Athletics =

- WA code: GIB

in Moscow
- Competitors: 1
- Medals: Gold 0 Silver 0 Bronze 0 Total 0

World Championships in Athletics appearances
- 1983; 1987; 1991; 1993; 1995; 1997; 1999; 2001; 2003; 2005; 2007; 2009; 2011; 2013; 2015; 2017; 2019; 2022; 2023; 2025

Gibraltar competed at the 2013 World Championships in Athletics in Moscow, Russia, from 10 to 18 August 2013. A team of one athlete represented the country in the event.

== Results ==
=== Men ===
Track and road events

Athlete	Event	Heat		Semifinal		Final	
Athlete	Event	Result	Rank	Result	Rank	Result	Rank
Jerai Torres	200 metres	22.98	55	Did not advance			
