= Zane Duquemin =

Jersey shot putter and discus thrower

Personal information
- Born: 23 September 1991 (age 34) Jersey, Channel Islands
- Height: 1.83 m (6 ft 0 in)
- Weight: 110 kg (243 lb)

Sport
- Sport: Athletics
- Event(s): Shot put, discus throw
- Club: Shaftesbury Barnet Harriers
- Coached by: John Hillie
Medal record
Representing Jersey
Island Games
Gold medal – first place	2011 Sandown	Shot put
Gold medal – first place	2011 Sandown	Discus throw
Gold medal – first place	2015 Jersey	Shot put
Gold medal – first place	2015 Jersey	Discus throw
Silver medal – second place	2023 Guernsey	Discus throw
British Championships
Gold medal – first place	2014 Birmingham	Discus throw
Silver medal – second place	2014 Birmingham	Shot put
Silver medal – second place	2015 Birmingham	Shot put
Silver medal – second place	2015 Birmingham	Discus throw
Silver medal – second place	2022 Manchester	Discus throw
Bronze medal – third place	2012 Birmingham	Shot put
Bronze medal – third place	2016 Birmingham	Discus throw
Bronze medal – third place	2025 Birmingham	Discus throw
British Indoor Championships
Gold medal – first place	2014 Sheffield	Shot put
Gold medal – first place	2015 Sheffield	Shot put
Silver medal – second place	2012 Sheffield	Shot put
Silver medal – second place	2013 Sheffield	Shot put

Zane Duquemin (born 23 September 1991) is a former athlete representing Jersey and Great Britain who specialised in the shot put and discus throw. He competed at three consecutive Commonwealth Games starting in 2010.

== Biography ==
Duquemin became British discus throw champion after winning the 2014 British Athletics Championships and posiumed five more times in 2015, 2016, 2017, 2022 and 2025.

Duquemin also podiumed three times in the shot put at the British Athletics Championships in 2012, 2014 and 2015.

His sister, Shadine Duquemin, competes in the same events as Zane.

== International competitions ==
Year	Competition	Venue	Position	Event	Notes
Representing Great Britain and Jersey
2008	Commonwealth Youth Games	Pune, India	9th	Shot put	14.96 m
2008	Commonwealth Youth Games	Pune, India	6th	Discus throw	46.29 m
2010	World Junior Championships	Moncton, Canada	18th (q)	Discus throw (1.75 kg)	54.62 m
2010	Commonwealth Games	Delhi, India	12th	Shot put	15.97 m
2010	Commonwealth Games	Delhi, India	10th	Discus throw	51.86 m
2011	Island Games	Sandown, Isle of Wight	1st	Shot put	17.15 m
2011	Island Games	Sandown, Isle of Wight	1st	Discus throw	56.43 m
2013	European U23 Championships	Tampere, Finland	4th	Shot put	19.19 m
2013	European U23 Championships	Tampere, Finland	11th	Discus throw	56.81 m
2014	Commonwealth Games	Glasgow, United Kingdom	9th	Shot put	18.16 m
2014	Commonwealth Games	Glasgow, United Kingdom	8th	Discus throw	59.39 m
2018	Commonwealth Games	Gold Coast, Australia	9th	Discus throw	55.64 m

== Personal bests ==
Outdoor

- Shot put – 19.42 (Hässleholm 2013)
- Discus throw – 63.76 (Manchester 2022)

Indoor

- Shot put – 18.86 (Växjö 2014)
