= Alastair Chalmers =

British athlete (born 2000)

Alastair Chalmers OLY
Personal information
- Nationality: British
- Born: 31 March 2000 (age 26) Guernsey

Sport
- Sport: Track and field
- Event: Hurdling
- College team: Bath
- Club: Guernsey
- Coached by: Matthew Elias

Achievements and titles
- Personal best: 400 mH: 48.30 (2025)
Medal record
Men's athletics
Representing Guernsey
Commonwealth Games
Bronze medal – third place	2022 Birmingham	400 metres hurdles
Commonwealth Youth Games
Gold medal – first place	2017 Bahamas	400 metres hurdles
Island Games
Gold medal – first place	2015 Jersey	4 × 100 m relay
Gold medal – first place	2015 Jersey	4 × 400 m relay
Gold medal – first place	2017 Gotland	400 metres hurdles
Gold medal – first place	2023 Guernsey	400 metres hurdles
Gold medal – first place	2023 Guernsey	4 × 400 m relay
Silver medal – second place	2017 Gotland	4 × 100 m relay
Representing Great Britain
European Indoor Championships
Bronze medal – third place	2025 Apeldoorn	Mixed 4 × 400 m relay
World U20 Championships
Bronze medal – third place	2018 Tampere	4 × 400 m

Alastair Chalmers OLY (born 31 March 2000) is a British track and field hurdler who specialises in the 400 metres hurdles. He won Guernsey's first-ever Commonwealth Games track and field medal when he took bronze at the 2022 edition and he is a six-time British 400 m hurdles champion.

== Athletics career ==
Chalmers was part of the gold medal-winning Guernsey 4 × 100 metres relay team at the 2015 Island Games in Jersey. He also received a gold for the 4 × 400 metres relay having run in the heats but missing out on selection for the final.

He won gold in the 400 metres hurdles at the 2017 Island Games in Gotland, before repeating the feat a month later at the 2017 Commonwealth Youth Games in the Bahamas.

Chalmers came sixth in the 400 metres hurdles and won a bronze medal as part of the Great Britain 4 × 400 metres relay team at the 2018 IAAF World U20 Championships in Tampere, Finland.

He won his first British 400 metres hurdles title at the 2020 national championships in a time of 49.66 secs.

Chalmers reached the semi-finals of the 2022 World Athletics Championships in Eugene, Oregon, USA.

On 6 August 2022, he won the first-ever track and field medal for Guernsey in the history of the Commonwealth Games when he claimed bronze at the 22nd edition of the event in Birmingham, England.

In July 2023, Chalmers took more than half a second off the championship record to win the 400 m hurdles at the Island Games held in Guernsey. He went on to win a second gold of the event in the 4 × 400 metres relay with the Guernsey team setting another Games record in the process.

At the 2024 European Athletics Championships in Rome, Italy, he set a new Guernsey 400 metres hurdles record of 48.76 seconds but went out in the semi-finals.

Chalmers won his fifth successive British 400 metres hurdles title at the 2024 British Athletics Championships on 30 June 2024, setting a new personal best, and championship record, of 48.54 seconds to put himself in line for a spot at the Paris Olympics. His place at the Games was confirmed on 5 July 2024, when Team GB announced their athletics team. Chalmers finished third in his heat to qualify for the semi-finals at the Games. In the semi-finals he hit a hurdle around 150 metres from the finish line and fell to the track, and although he got up to complete the race, he finished eighth and did not progress to the final.

He was named Outstanding Performer of the Year at the 2024 Guernsey Sports Commission Awards.

Chalmers won the bronze medal in the 400 metres at the 2025 British Indoor Athletics Championships, setting a new personal best of 46.84 secs in the semi-finals. He was subsequently selected for the Great Britain 4 × 400 metres relay squad to take part in the 2025 European Athletics Indoor Championships. Chalmers won a bronze medal as part of the British team in the mixed relay on the first day of the competition.

On 8 June 2025, Chalmers set a new 400 metres hurdles personal best, recording 48.30 secs to take first place at the Weltklasse Rehlingen in Germany.

At the 2025 World Athletics Championships in Tokyo, Japan, he reached the semi-finals, but came sixth in a time of 49.49 secs and subsequently failed to qualify for the final.

On 21 June 2026, Chalmers won his sixth British title at the national championships in Birmingham, running a time 49.05 seconds in the final.

Having won his heat in 48.92 seconds to qualify as fourth fastest, Chalmers ran a time of 50.24 seconds to finish sixth in the 400 metres hurdles final at the Commonwealth Games in Glasgow, Scotland, on 31 July 2026.

On 12 August 2026, Chalmers ran a time of 49.71 seconds to finish seventh in his semifinal at the European Championships in Birmingham and therefore miss out on qualification for the final.

== Personal life ==
Chalmers gained a degree in Sports Performance from the University of Bath. His brother Cameron is also an athlete who has represented Guernsey and Great Britain in international competition.
