= Taahira Butterfield =

Bermudan sprinter

Personal information
- Born: 5 October 1996 (age 29) Devonshire Parish, Bermuda
- Education: University at Albany, SUNY
- Height: 1.65 m (5 ft 5 in)
- Weight: 49 kg (108 lb)

Sport
- Country: Athletics
- Sport: 100 metres, 200 metres
- University team: Albany Great Danes
- League: NCAA Division I
Medal record
Women's athletics
Representing Bermuda
Island Games
| Gold medal – first place | 2015 Jersey | 100 m |
| Gold medal – first place | 2015 Jersey | 200 m |
| Silver medal – second place | 2017 Gotland | 100 m |
| Silver medal – second place | 2017 Gotland | 200 m |
- Updated on 2 November 2017

Taahira Naeema Butterfield is a Bermudan sprinter, who won two gold medals at the 2015 Island Games, and two silver medals at the 2017 Island Games. She has also competed at the CARIFTA Games, as well as the Central American and Caribbean Junior Championships in Athletics and the World Youth Championships in Athletics. She attends University at Albany, SUNY, where she competes as part of the Albany Great Danes.

== Athletics career ==
Taahira Butterfield was born on 5 October 2000, and raised in Devonshire Parish, Bermuda. She attended Cedarbridge Academy, and then moved to the United States to study at the University at Albany, SUNY in New York. Butterfield competed for Bermuda at the CARIFTA Games from 2011 onwards, and at the 2012 Central American and Caribbean Junior Championships in Athletics in San Salvador, El Salvador.

She travelled to Ukraine to compete at the 2013 World Youth Championships in Athletics. As a result of this, while at CedarBridge Academy, she was named senior girl's winner of the Denton Hurdle Award in Bermuda. Outside of Athletics, she has also competed in netball in the national under-18s team. She competes in athletics for Albany Great Danes, the University's sports team.

Butterfield competed for Bermuda at the 2015 Island Games in Jersey in the 100 and 200 meters, winning the gold medal in both events. At the 2017 Island Games in Gotland, Sweden, she competed in the same events again, this time finishing in second place each time winning two silver medals.
