= Carl Morgan (athlete) =

Caymanian long jumper

Personal information
- Born: 25 August 1986 (age 39) George Town, Cayman Islands

Sport
- Sport: Track and field
Medal record
Representing Cayman Islands
Island Games
Gold medal – first place	2011 Isle of Wight	4x100m relay
Gold medal – first place	2011 Isle of Wight	Long jump
Gold medal – first place	2011 Isle of Wight	Triple jump
Gold medal – first place	2017 Gotland	4x100m relay
Gold medal – first place	2017 Gotland	Triple jump
Silver medal – second place	2005 Shetland	200m
Silver medal – second place	2005 Shetland	Javelin throw
Silver medal – second place	2017 Gotland	Long jump
Bronze medal – third place	2005 Shetland	100m

Carl Morgan (born 25 August 1986) is a Caymanian long jumper.

As a junior he won medals at the CARIFTA Games, finished ninth at the 2006 NACAC Under-23 Championships and won the bronze medal at the 2008 NACAC Under-23 Championships. He won three medals at the 2005 Island Games, won three gold medals at the 2011 Island Games and three medals (two gold) at the 2017 Island Games.

Focusing on the long jump in larger competitions, he finished sixth at the 2008 Central American and Caribbean Championships (and also sixth in the triple jump), fifth at the 2009 Central American and Caribbean Championships (and also sixth in the triple jump), ninth at the 2010 Central American and Caribbean Games, ninth at the 2011 Pan American Games, fourth at the 2011 Central American and Caribbean Championships. He also competed at the 2010 Commonwealth Games, the 2013 Central American and Caribbean Championships (no mark), the 2014 Commonwealth Games and the 2018 Commonwealth Games (no mark) without reaching the final.

His personal best jump is 8.02 metres, achieved in March 2012 in Athens. He has 15.96 metres in the triple jump, achieved in May 2009 in Murfreesboro. The latter is the Caymanian record.

He is a twin brother of fellow athlete Carlos Morgan.
