= Ty Johnson =

Ty Johnson may refer to:

- Ty Johnson (American football), American football running back
- Ty Johnson (baseball), American baseball pitcher
- Ty Johnson (comics), Marvel Comics character in the superhero duo known as Cloak and Dagger
  - Ty Johnson (Marvel Cinematic Universe)

== See also ==
- Tyler Johnson (disambiguation)
- Tyrone Johnson (disambiguation)
