= Tyrone Johnson =

Tyrone Johnson may refer to:

- Tyrone Johnson (American football) (born 1971), American football player
- Tyrone Johnson (basketball) (born 1992), American basketball player
- Tyrone Johnson (Marvel Cinematic Universe), fictional character

== See also ==
- Tyler Johnson (disambiguation)
- Ty Johnson (disambiguation)
