= Gibraltar at the 2022 European Championships =

- Website: https://www.gibraltarathletics.com/

in (Germany) Munich 11 August 2018 – 21 August 2018
- Competitors: 2 in 1 sport
- Medals: Gold 0 Silver 0 Bronze 0 Total 0

European Championships appearances (overview)
- 2018; 2022

Gibraltar competed at the 2022 European Championships in Munich, Germany, from 11–21 August 2022.

== Competitors ==
The following is the list of number of competitors in the Championships:

Sport	Men	Women	Total
Athletics	1	1	2

== Athletics ==
The following two athletes were selected to compete by the Gibraltar Amateur Athletic Association:

Athletes	Event	Heats		Semifinal		Final	
Athletes	Event	Result	Rank	Result	Rank	Result	Rank
Jerai Torres	Men's 200 metres	22.70	8	did not advance			
Norcady Reyes	Women's 400 metres	59.59	8	did not advance			
