= Clare Wilson =

English footballer

Personal information
- Date of birth: c. 1 April 1886
- Place of birth: Boroughbridge, Yorkshire
- Date of death: 9 October 1917 (aged 31)
- Place of death: Western Front
- Position: Inside left

Senior career*
| Years | Team | Apps | (Gls) |
- Wallsend Park Villa
- Gateshead Town
| 1907–1908 | Bradford City | 2 | (0) |
- Glossop
- Oldham Athletic
- Gateshead
- * Club domestic league appearances and goals

Clare Wilson (c. 1 April 1886 – 9 October 1917) was an English professional footballer who played as an inside left.

== Career ==
Wilson spent his early career with Wallsend Park Villa and Gateshead Town. He signed for Bradford City from Gateshead in March 1907. He made 2 league appearances for the club, before joining Glossop in December 1908. He later played for Oldham Athletic and Gateshead.

== Death ==
Wilson joined the Durham Light Infantry in December 1915 and then transferred to the Manchester Regiment's 22nd Battalion. He was killed in action on the Western Front on 9 October 1917 and is buried at Tyne Cot Cemetery, Belgium.

== Sources ==
- Frost, Terry (1988). Bradford City A Complete Record 1903-1988. Breedon Books Sport. ISBN 0-907969-38-0.
