= Athletics at the 2015 Island Games =

- Dates: 27 June – 3 July
- Venue: FB Athletics Track
- Level: Senior
- Events: 42
- Records set: 6

Athletics, for the 2015 Island Games, was held at the FB Athletics Track

== Medal table ==
* Host nation (Jersey)

Final medal table
| Rank | Nation | Gold | Silver | Bronze | Total |
|---|---|---|---|---|---|
| 1 | Jersey* | 6 | 11 | 3 | 20 |
| 2 | Isle of Man | 6 | 4 | 7 | 17 |
| 3 | Cayman Islands | 6 | 1 | 3 | 10 |
| 4 | Guernsey | 5 | 5 | 7 | 17 |
| 5 | Bermuda | 4 | 3 | 0 | 7 |
| 6 | Gibraltar | 3 | 2 | 0 | 5 |
| 7 | Saare County | 2 | 5 | 3 | 10 |
| 8 | Shetland | 2 | 4 | 4 | 10 |
| 9 | Isle of Wight | 2 | 1 | 1 | 4 |
| 10 | (Anglesey) Ynys Môn | 2 | 0 | 3 | 5 |
| 11 | Western Isles | 1 | 1 | 5 | 7 |
| 12 | Gotland | 1 | 0 | 2 | 3 |
| 13 | Rhodes | 1 | 0 | 0 | 1 |
| 13 | Åland | 1 | 0 | 0 | 1 |
| 15 | Faroe Islands | 0 | 3 | 2 | 5 |
| 16 | Orkney | 0 | 1 | 1 | 2 |
| Totals (16 entries) | | 42 | 41 | 41 | 124 |

== Results ==
=== Men ===
| Event | Gold | | Silver | | Bronze | |
|---|---|---|---|---|---|---|
| 100 metres | Tyrell Cuffy (Cayman Islands) | 10.73 | Joshua Allaway (Guernsey) | 10.78 | Philip Williams (Jersey) | 10.95 |
| 200 metres | Tyrell Cuffy (Cayman Islands) | 21.24 | Joshua Allaway (Guernsey) | 21.65 | Karim Murray (Cayman Islands) | 22.37 |
| 400 metres | Cameron Chalmers (Guernsey) | 48.03 | Sam Dawkins (Jersey) | 48.81 | Donald Macleod (Western Isles) | 49.10 |
| 800 metres | Donald Maclead (Western Isles) | 1:53.89 | Harvey Dixon (Gibraltar) | 1:54.95 | Tahj Lewis (Cayman Islands) | 1:55.43 |
| 1,500 metres | Iolo Hughes (Ynys Môn) | 3:54.95 | Elliott Dorey (Jersey) | 3:55.35 | Connor Maclean (Western Isles) | 3:55.66 |
| 5,000 metres | Harvey Dixon (Gibraltar) | 14:29.47 | Christopher Estwanik (Bermuda) | 14:30.84 | Iolo Hughes (Ynys Môn) | 14:32.14 |
| 10,000 metres | Christopher Estwanik (Bermuda) | 30:04.66 | Kevin Loundes (Isle of Man) | 30:53.28 | Alan Corlett (Isle of Man) | 32:24.70 |
| 110 metres hurdles | Ronald Forbes (Cayman Islands) | 13.62 | Peter Irving (Jersey) | 15.38 | Thomas Riley (Isle of Man) | 15.70 |
| 400 metres hurdles | Stanley Livingston (Jersey) | 52.96 | Sam Wallbridge (Guernsey) | 53.51 | Michael Haslett (Isle of Man) | 54.28 |
| 3,000 metres Steeplechase | Daniel John Romeril (Jersey) | 09:44.01 | Ed Mason (Guernsey) | 09:50.47 | Alan Corlett (Isle of Man) | 09:51.64 |
| 4×100 metres relay | Guernsey; Joshua Allaway; Dale Garland; Sam Wallbridge; Alastair Chalmers; Hywel Robinson | 42.44 | Jersey; Sam Dawkins; Ross Jeffs; Bill Porter; Philip Williams | 42.72 | Orkney; Andrew Davis; James Flett; Fergus Macivor; Gordon Mowat; David Miller | 43.30 |
| 4×400 metres relay | Guernsey; Joshua Allaway; Cameron Chalmers; Dale Garland; Sam Wallbridge; Alastair Chalmers; Matthew Loveridge; Hywel Robinson | 3:16.39 | Jersey; Sam Dawkins; Elliott Dorey; Peter Irving; Stanley Livingston; Benjamin Silva; Aaron Turmel | 3:19.45 | Western Isles; Murdo Mackenzie; Connor Maclean; Donald Macleod; Michael William Macmillan; Paul Morrison | 3:24.39 |
| Half-Marathon | Christophe Estwanik (Bermuda) | 1:07:16 | Lee Merrien (Guernsey) | 1:07:51 | Kevin Loundes (Isle of Man) | 1:08:41 |
| Half-marathon team | Guernsey; Lee Merrien; Michael Wilesmith; David Emery | 7 | Shetland; Bobby Bristow; Matthew Cox; Leon Johnson | 16 | Isle of Man; Andrew Barron; Kevin Loundes | 17 |
| High jump | Jason Fox (Jersey) | 2.05 | Joshua Hewett (Isle of Man) | 2.00 | Herkki Leemet (Saaremaa) | 1.90 |
| Long jump | Daniel Örevik (Gotland) | 7.13 | James Groocock (Isle of Wight) | 7.09 | Ross Jeffs (Jersey) | 6.97 |
| Triple jump | Savvas Diakonikolas (Rhodes) | 14.42 | Ross Jeffs (Jersey) | 14.39 | Mattias Sunneborn (Gotland) | 14.05 |
| Shot put | Zane Duquemin (Jersey) | 18.10 | Genro Paas (Saaremaa) | 15.57 | Erik Larsson (Gotland) | 14.42 |
| Discus throw | Zane Duquemin (Jersey) | 57.23 | Hallur Simonsen (Faroe Islands) | 44.89 | Connor Laverty (Anglesey) | 43.33 |
| Javelin throw | Alexander Pascal (Cayman Islands) | 65.03 | Jako Lindrop (Saaremaa) | 63.20 | Sander Suurhans (Saaremaa) | 62.98 |
| Hammer throw | Andrew Frost (Isle of Wight) | 68.58 | Genro Paas (Saaremaa) | 57.94 | Maurice Williamson (Shetland) | 47.96 |

=== Women ===
| Event | Gold | | Silver | | Bronze | |
|---|---|---|---|---|---|---|
| 100 metres | Taahira Butterfield (Bermuda) | 12.24 | Natasha Trott (Bermuda) | 12.32 | Faye Cox (Shetland) | 12.39 |
| 200 metres | Taahira Butterfield (Bermuda) | 25.51 | Natasha Trott (Bermuda) | 25.62 | Faye Cox (Shetland) | 25.68 |
| 400 metres | Catherine Reid (Isle of Man) | 53.39 | Emma Leask (Shetland) | 57.67 | Mikaela Harrison (Anglesey) | 58.33 |
| 800 metres | Rachael Franklin (Isle of Man) | 2:12.71 | Rebekka Fuglø (Faroe Islands) | 2:12.77 | Natalie Whitty (Guernsey) | 2:13.13 |
| 1,500 metres | Rachael Franklin (Isle of Man) | 4:24.93 | Eilidh Mackenzie (Western Isles) | 4:25.00 | Sarah Mercier (Guernsey) | 4:27.17 |
| 3000 metres Steeplechase | Claire Wilson (Shetland) | 11:16.74 | No silver awarded | | No bronze awarded | |
| 5,000 metres | Sarah Mercier (Guernsey) | 17.03.75 | Katie Bristow (Shetland) | 17:17.56 | Marna Leila Vandsdal Egholm (Faroe Islands) | 17:44.45 |
| 10,000 metres | Kim Baglietto (Gibraltar) | 36:23.35 | Marna Leila Vandsdal Egholm (Faroe Islands) | 36:48.25 | Louise Perrio (Guernsey) | 37:21.72 |
| 100 metres hurdles | Hannah Riley (Isle of Man) | 14.89 | Claire Lidster (Jersey) | 15.05 | Pille-Riin Toomsalu (Saaremaa) | 15.34 |
| 400 metres hurdles | Mikaela Harrison (Ynys Môn) | 64.30 | Claire Lidster (Jersey) | 64.40 | Eve Carrington (Western Isles) | 64.72 |
| 4×100 metres relay | Shetland; Faye Cox; Kristi Grant; Sophie Moar; Tamar Moncrieff | 49.05 | Jersey; Helen Butler-Day; Claire Lidster; Katrina Lindsay; Ogubemi Popo | 49.40 | Guernsey; Hannah Barrett; Eleanor Gallagher; Victoria Mann; Sara Marley | 49.68 |
| 4×400 metres relay | Isle of Man; Harriet Pryke; Catherine Reid; Hannah Riley; Sara Watterson; Rachael Franklin | 3:56.17 | Jersey; Gemma Dawkins; Hazel Le Cornu; Gemma Gothard; Yasmin Lookess; Helen Butler-Day; Katie Silva | 3:59.12 | Guernsey; Eleanor Gallagher; Katie Rowe; Natalie Whitty; Rebecca Toll; Sarah Mercier | 4:00.05 |
| Half-Marathon | Kim Baglietto (Gibraltar) | 1:21:35 | Hannah Howard (Isle of Man) | 1:22:45 | Louise Perrio (Guernsey) | 1:23:21 |
| Half-marathon team | Isle of Man; Nikki Boyde; Hannah Howard; Rachael Tewkesbury | 9 | Gibraltar; Kim Baglietto; Allison Edwards | 13 | Faroe Islands; Marna Leila Vandsdal Egholm; Bjørk Herup Olsen | 14 |
| High jump | Teele Treiel (Saaremaa) | 1.70 | Mari-Helen Saarna (Saaremaa) | 1.65 | Ashley Nalty (Cayman Islands) | 1.60 |
| Long jump | Hanna Wiss (Åland Islands) | 5.78 | Bethan Pilley (Isle of Man) | 5.49 | Sophie Moar (Shetland) | 5.37 |
| Triple jump | Mari-Helen Saarna (Saaremaa) | 11.47 | Kamela Monks (Jersey) | 11.24 | Roseanna Hill (Jersey) | 11.02 |
| Shot put | Lacee Barnes (Cayman Islands) | 12.19 | Teele Treiel (Saaremaa) | 10.94 | Eve Carrington (Western Isles) | 10.52 |
| Discus throw | Shadine Duquemin (Jersey) | 48.58 | Lacee Barnes (Cayman Islands) | 41.52 | Andrea De Bruin (Isle of Man) | 34.72 |
| Javelin throw | Daneliz Thomas (Cayman Islands) | 38.54 | Thora Cant (Orkney) | 38.52 | Alexandra Higgins (Guernsey) | 35.16 |
| Hammer throw | Amy Church (Isle of Wight) | 46.90 | Elaine Park (Shetland) | 38.67 | Wallis Canning (Isle of Wight) | 38.19 |
