= Athletics at the 2019 Island Games =

- Dates: 7–12 July
- Host city: Gibraltar
- Venue: Lathbury Sports Complex
- Level: Senior

This is a list of athletics results at the 2019 Island Games, held at the Lathbury Sports Complex, Gibraltar in July 2019.

== Medal table ==
* Host nation (Gibraltar)

| Rank | Nation | Gold | Silver | Bronze | Total |
|---|---|---|---|---|---|
| 1 | Isle of Man | 9 | 4 | 3 | 16 |
| 2 | Guernsey | 6 | 5 | 4 | 15 |
| 3 | Saaremaa | 6 | 2 | 0 | 8 |
| 4 | Jersey | 4 | 6 | 5 | 15 |
| 5 | Isle of Wight | 3 | 1 | 3 | 7 |
| 6 | Cayman Islands | 2 | 6 | 3 | 11 |
| 7 | Shetland | 2 | 1 | 2 | 5 |
| 8 | Gibraltar* | 2 | 1 | 1 | 4 |
| 9 | Åland | 2 | 0 | 0 | 2 |
| 10 | Gotland | 1 | 4 | 3 | 8 |
| 11 | Menorca | 1 | 1 | 2 | 4 |
| 12 | Faroe Islands | 0 | 2 | 6 | 8 |
| 13 | Orkney | 0 | 2 | 1 | 3 |
| 14 | Ynys Môn | 0 | 1 | 3 | 4 |
| 15 | Western Isles | 0 | 1 | 1 | 2 |
| 16 | Bermuda | 0 | 1 | 0 | 1 |
| Totals (16 entries) | | 38 | 38 | 37 | 113 |

== Results ==
=== Men ===
| Event | Gold | | Silver | | Bronze | |
|---|---|---|---|---|---|---|
| 100 m | Joe Chadwick; Guernsey | 10.82 | Jeavhon Jackson; Cayman Islands | 10.94 | Tyler Johnson; Jersey | 11.01 |
| 200 m | Jessy Franco; Gibraltar | 22.47 | Joe Chadwick; Guernsey | 22.72 | Tyler Johnson; Jersey | 23.08 |
| 400 m | Jessy Franco; Gibraltar | 48.34 | Sherlock Brooks; Cayman Islands | 49.31 | Seumas Mackay; Shetland | 49.76 |
| 800 m | Seumas Mackay; Shetland | 1:53.18 | David Mullarkey; Isle of Man | 1:55.71 | Michael Smikle; Cayman Islands | 1:55.71 |
| 1500 m | David Mullarkey; Isle of Man | 3:55.13 | Elliott Dorey; Jersey | 3:55.24 | Iolo Hughes; Ynys Môn | 3:55.68 |
| 5000 m | Elliott Dorey; Jersey | 15:24.84 | Harvey Dixon; Gibraltar | 15:25.56 | Daniel Eckersley; Isle of Wight | 15:29.61 |
| 10000 m | Alan Corlett; Isle of Man | 32:06.26 | Daniel Antonsson; Gotland | 32:15.41 | Fred Grönwall; Gotland | 32:16.13 |
| 110 m hurdles | Peter Irving; Jersey | 16.08 | Toby Glass; Guernsey | 16.34 | not awarded | |
| 400 m hurdles | James Forman; Isle of Wight | 52.71 | Sam Wallbridge; Guernsey | 53.89 | Peter Curtis; Guernsey | 54.44 |
| 3000 m steeplechase | Daniel Eckersley; Isle of Wight | 9:29.12 | Max Costley; Isle of Man | 9:43.35 | Ed Mason; Guernsey | 9:59.64 |
| 4 × 100 m relay | Guernsey; Joe Chadwick; Peter Curtis; Tom Druce; Joshua Duke; Lucas Rive; Sam Wallbridge | 41.91 | Jersey; Peter Irving; Ross Jeffs; Tyler Johnson; Benjamin Le Rougetel; Charles Livingston; Robert Thomas | 41.99 | Cayman Islands; Sherlock Brooks; Louis Gordon; Jeavhon Jackson; Carl Morgan; Karim Murray; Michael Smikle | 42.03 |
| 4 × 400 m relay | Guernsey; Joe Chadwick; Peter Curtis; Tom Druce; Dale Garland; Sam Wallbridge; Joseph Yeaman | 3:13.51 | Cayman Islands; Sherlock Brooks; Louis Gordon; Jeavhon Jackson; Carl Morgan; Karim Murray; Michael Smikle | 3:13.77 | Jersey; William Brown; Sam Dawkins; Peter Irving; Tyler Johnson; Charles Livingston; Samuel Maher | 3:17.99 |
| Half-marathon | Oliver Lockley; Isle of Man | 1:06:54 | Alan Corlett; Isle of Man | 1:07:37 | Fred Grönwall; Gotland | 1:09:18 |
| Half-marathon team | Isle of Man; Alan Corlett; Max Costley; Oliver Lockley | 3 | Gotland; Daniel Antonsson; Fred Grönwall | 7 | Gibraltar; Harvey Dixon; Andrew Gordon; Arnold Rogers | 11 |
| High jump | Louis Gordon; Cayman Islands | 2.02 m | Benjamin Le Rougetel; Jersey | 1.99 m | James Margrave; Isle of Man | 1.99 m |
| Long jump | Ross Jeffs; Jersey | 7.23 m | Carl Morgan; Cayman Islands | 7.15 m | Louis Gordon; Cayman Islands | 6.93 m |
| Triple jump | Carl Morgan; Cayman Islands | 15.33 m | Ross Jeffs; Jersey | 14.32 m | Daniel Örevik; Gotland | 14.22 m |
| Shot put | Genro Paas; Saaremaa | 14.82 m | Erik Larsson; Gotland | 13.87 m | Patrick Harris; Ynys Môn | 12.58 m |
| Discus throw | Herkki Leemet; Saaremaa | 40.20 m | Nathan Thomas; Jersey | 40.02 m | Cameron Campbell; Jersey | 39.60 m |

=== Women ===
| Event | Gold | | Silver | | Bronze | |
|---|---|---|---|---|---|---|
| 100 m | Sara Wiss; Åland | 12.83 | Danika Lyn; Cayman Islands | 12.89 | Katie Dinwoodie; Shetland | 12.97 |
| 200 m | Katie Dinwoodie; Shetland | 24.64 | Taylah Spence; Orkney | 24.65 | Abigail Galpin; Guernsey | 24.99 |
| 400 m | Ashleigh Lachenicht; Isle of Man | 56.02 | Elanor Gallagher; Guernsey | 57.43 | Ffion Roberts; Ynys Môn | 58.53 |
| 800 m | Rachel Franklin; Isle of Man | 2:09.87 GR | Rebekka Fuglø; Faroe Islands | 2:13.53 | Katie Rowe; Guernsey | 2:15.31 |
| 1500 m | Rachel Franklin; Isle of Man | 4:31.06 | Rebekka Fuglø; Faroe Islands | 4:37.75 | Mabel Lewis; Isle of Wight | 4:52.56 |
| 5000 m | Sarah Mercier; Guernsey | 17:16.81 | Marina Olives; Menorca | 17:21.75 | Rebekka Fuglø; Faroe Islands | 18.30.97 |
| 10000 m | Sarah Mercier; Guernsey | 37:47.48 | Jenny James; Guernsey | 38:20.85 | Sarah Vallin; Faroe Islands | 40:57.87 |
| 100 m hurdles | Rhiannon Dowinton; Guernsey | 16.34 | Hannah Riley; Isle of Man | 16.76 | Angela Martí; Menorca | 17.48 |
| 400 m hurdles | Aimee Cringle; Isle of Man | 1:03.58 | Shianne Smith; Bermuda | 1:04.49 | Angela Martí; Menorca | 1:07.74 |
| 3000 m steeplechase | Marina Olives; Menorca | 10:58.28 GR | Ffion Jones; Ynys Môn | 12:56.71 | not awarded | |
| 4 × 100 m relay | Åland Islands; Linn Gustafsson; Anni Nylund; Adina Renlund; Ida-Maria Sjölund; Sara Wiss | 47.94 | Cayman Islands; Danielle Bailey; Tiffany Cole; Aijah Lewis; Danika Lyn; Pearl Morgan; Anissa Owen | 47.99 | Isle of Man; Bethany Carridge; Ashleigh Lachenicht; Lydia Morris; Bethan Pilley; Meghan Pilley; Hannah Riley | 48.37 |
| 4 × 400 m relay | Isle of Man; Phoebe Coates; Aimee Cringle; Rachael Franklin; Ashleigh Lachenicht; Lydia Morris; Hannah Riley | 3:54.01 | Orkney; Erika Marwick; Sian Smith; Taylah Spence; Tegan Spence; Alice Tait | 3:58.34 | Faroe Islands; Maria Biskopstø; Margit Weihe Fríðmundsdóttir; Rebekka Fuglø; Oddvør Josephsen; Alda Sigursdóttir Lamhauge; Elisabet Holm Simonsen | 4:02.60 |
| Half-marathon | Charlotte Metcalfe; Isle of Wight | 1:24:15 | Rebecca Thompson; Jersey | 1:24:38 | Jessica Troy; Jersey | 1:25:00 |
| Half-marathon team | Jersey; Rebecca Thompson; Jessica Troy | 5 | Isle of Wight; Laura Brackley; Charlotte Metcalfe; Rosanna Sexton | 5 | Faroe Islands; Rigmor Napoleonsdóttir Arge; Sarah Vallin | 14 |
| High jump | Teele Treiel; Saaremaa | 1.74 m | Lucy Holden; Shetland | 1.59 m | Teresa Fríðriksdóttir Bláhamar; Faroe Islands | 1.56 m |
| High jump | Teele Treiel; Saaremaa | 1.74 m | Lucy Holden; Shetland | 1.59 m | Amy Davis; Orkney | 1.56 m |
| Long jump | Kärt Õunapuu; Saaremaa | 6.19 m | Moa Örevik; Gotland | 5.90 m | Bethan Pilley; Isle of Man | 5.79 m |
| Triple jump | Moa Örevik; Gotland | 11.44 m | Mary Macleod; Western Isles | 11.14 m | Heather Marie MacKinnon; Western Isles | 11.10 m |
| Shot put | Linda Kivistik; Saaremaa | 13.84 m | Airike Kapp; Saaremaa | 11.92 m | Lydia Poula Simonsen; Faroe Islands | 11.18 m |
| Discus throw | Linda Kivistik; Saaremaa | 41.89 m | Airike Kapp; Saaremaa | 40.82 m | Bridget Fryer; Isle of Wight | 40.58 m |
