= Tyler Johnson (athlete) =

American track and field athlete

Personal information
- National team: Nigeria
- Born: February 11, 1998 (age 28)

Sport
- Sport: Track and field
- Event: Sprints

Achievements and titles
- Personal bests: 200 m: 20.60 s (Illinois 2021); 400 m: 44.95 s (Baton Rouge 2022)

Tyler Johnson is an American track and field athlete who completed his transfer of allegiance in March 2026, making him eligible to compete for Nigeria. He specializes in the 400m and, in 2026, competed at the Nigerian Athletics Championships, where he became the national champion.

== Early life ==
He began his athletic career in seventh grade at Dayton Boys Prep Academy, where he competed in both basketball and track and field.

== Career ==
While at Stivers High School, he set a Division III record of 46.57 seconds in 2016. At Ohio State University, he competed in the 2021 NCAA Championships, where he placed seventh with a time of 45.40 seconds. He also reached the final in 2022 before stepping away from track and field until 2026.

In 2026, he completed his switch to represent Nigeria, despite having previously represented the United States in the 4 × 400 m relay in 2018.
