= Bjørk Herup Olsen =

Faroese distance runner (born 1991)

Bjørk Herup Olsen (born 2 October 1991) is a Faroese athlete. She is until now (2012) the best female middle- and long-distance runner in the Faroe Islands. Herup Olsen has won several Danish Junior Championships and holds several Faroese records. She was the first Faroese woman, who ran 3000 m under 10 minutes. Bjørk is running for the Faroese club Bragdið and for the Danish club Helsingør Idrætsforening. She signed her letter of intent to run track at East Carolina University.

== Personal records ==
- 800 meter: 2:20.01 Gothenburg, Sweden 4 July 2010 (Faroese record)
- 1500 meter: 4:37.83 Gothenburg, Sweden 3 July 2010 (Faroese record)
- 3000 meter: 9:59,91 Pennsylvania, USA 28 January 2012 (Faroese record)
- 5000 meters: 17.12,75 in Ohio, USA February 2012 (Faroese record)
- 10,000 meters: 36:58,27 North Carolina 2012 (Faroese record)
- 1500 meter - Indoors: 4.38,04 Reykjavík International Games, Iceland 17 January 2010
- 1 mile - Indoors: 5:19,35 Reykjavík 20 January 2008
- 3000 meter - Indoors: 10.02,47 Skive, Denmark 6. marts 2010 (Faroese indoor record)
