= Claire Wilson (athlete) =

Claire Wilson (born 7 November 1985 in Shetland, Scotland) is an athlete residing in Jersey. She won running events for Shetland, including:

- Isle of Man 2001: 800m silver
- Guernsey 2003: 1,500m gold; 800m and 4 × 400 m bronze
- Shetland 2005: 800m and 1,500m gold
- Rhodes 2007: 800m and 1,500m gold.

She has won various running events representing Jersey, including Isle of Wight 2011: 4 × 400 m gold; 800m and 1,500m silver.women's 4×100 metres relay team.
