= Dominic Carroll =

Gibraltarian athlete (born 1983)

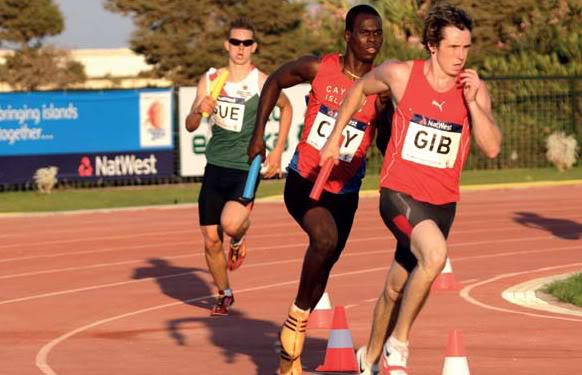

Personal information
- Nationality: British
- Born: Dominic Carroll; 15 November 1983 (age 42) Amsterdam
- Height: <1.79m>

Sport
- Country: Gibraltar
- Sport: Running
- Club: Gibraltar Amateur Athletics Association

Achievements and titles
- Personal best: 60m 6.72

Dominic Carroll (born 15 November 1983, Amsterdam) is a retired Gibraltarian track athlete.

Notable achievements include medals at the Youth Centennial Games (organised by the International Olympic Committee to celebrate its centenary), and four medals at three Island Games. He has also competed in a number of World and European championships. In 2010 prior to the European Athletics Championships he was hailed as the "True Spirit of Barcelona 2010" and picked out as one to watch during the competition; however, he was disqualified due to a false start and could not compete after falling victim to the IAAFs new one chance ruling when it came to false starts. During the years spanning 2005 to 2008 he was part of an elite training squad based in Cardiff which included Welsh athletes Dai Greene and Gareth Warburton, and English athlete Richard Hill, he was deemed to have the potential to match the performance levels of his fellow athletes but a series of injuries hampered his development.

== International championships attended ==
- IOC Youth Centennial Games, Aalborg, Denmark, 1996
- IOC World Youth Games, Moscow, Russia, 1998
- IAAF World Youth Athletics Championships, Bydgoszcz, Poland, 1999
- IIGA Island Games, Isle of Man, United Kingdom, 2001
- IAAF World Cross Country Championships, Vilamoura, Portugal 2000
- IAAF World Cross Country Championships, Oostende, Belgium 2001
- EAA European Athletics Championships, Munich, Germany, 2002
- IIGA Island Games, Guernsey, United Kingdom, 2003
- IAAF World Athletics Championships, Paris, France, 2003
- IIGA Island Games, Shetland Islands, United Kingdom, 2005
- EAA European Indoor Athletics Championships, Birmingham, United Kingdom, 2007
- IIGA Island Games, Rhodes, Greece, 2007
- EAA European Indoor Athletics Championships, Turin, Italy, 2009
- IIGA Island Games, Åland, Finland, 2009
- IAAF World Athletics Championships, Berlin, Germany, 2009
- EAA European Athletics Championships, Barcelona, Spain, 2010
- IIGA Island Games, Isle of Wight, United Kingdom, 2011
- IAAF World Indoor Athletics Championships, İstanbul, Turkey, 2012
- EAA European Indoor Athletics Championships, Gothenburg, Sweden, 2013
- IIGA Island Games, Bermuda, 2013
