= Arnold Rogers =

Gibraltarian long-distance runner

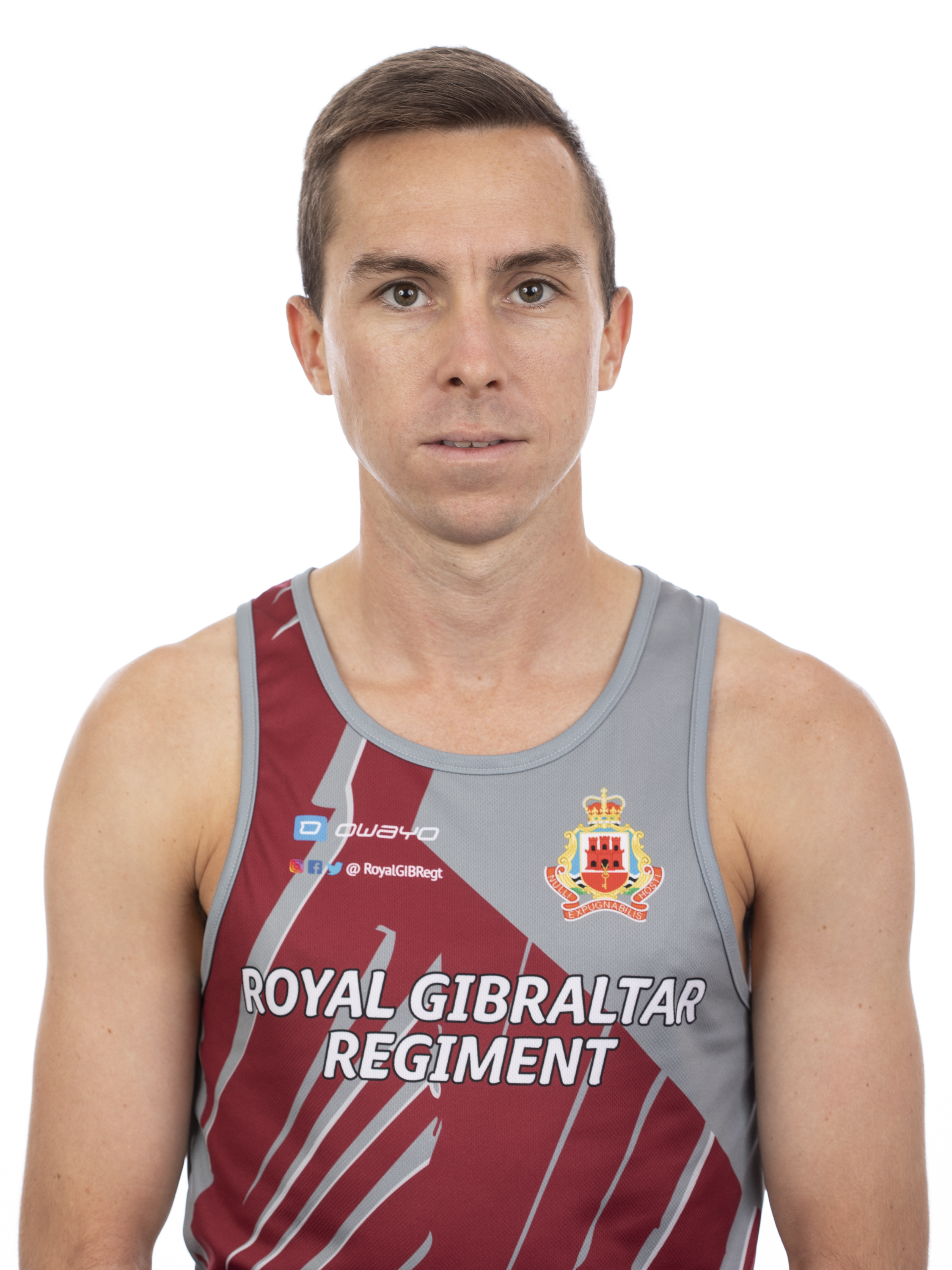

Personal information
- Born: 4 September 1990 (age 35) Portsmouth, United Kingdom
- Home town: La Línea de la Concepción
- Occupation(s): Royal Gibraltar Regiment, British Army

Sport
- Country: Gibraltar
- Sport: Long-distance running, Athletics
- Event(s): Half Marathon, Marathon, 5000m, 10000m, 5km, 10km
- Coached by: Joshua Schofield PGC1 Coaching
Medal record
Men's athletics
Representing Gibraltar
Island Games
| Bronze medal – third place | 2019 Gibraltar | Half marathon team |

Arnold Rogers (born 4 September 1990) is a Gibraltarian long-distance runner and the current national record holder for the marathon.

Currently serving as a soldier in the Royal Gibraltar Regiment, a regiment of the British Army, he is supported by the Army Elite Sports Program as a tier 3 athlete. The program is aimed at identification and development of the Army's most talented athletes and enables athletes to train alongside their regular jobs. He currently competes wearing the jersey of his unit athletics team.

In 2018, he competed in the men's half marathon at the 2018 IAAF World Half Marathon Championships held in Valencia, Spain. He finished in 138th place. In 2018, he also competed in the men's marathon at the 2018 European Athletics Championships held in Berlin, Germany. He finished in 57th place with a time of 2:32:41.

In 2019, he won the bronze medal in the men's half marathon team event at the 2019 Island Games held in Gibraltar.

In 2021, he competed for Gibraltar at the European Cross Country Championships in Dublin, Ireland finishing 78th.

In February 2022, Arnold ran the Seville Marathon finishing in 2:28:08 setting a new Gibraltar national record. He competed at the 2022 Commonwealth Games where he came 16th in the men's marathon event.
