= Jessy Franco =

Gibraltarian sprinter

Personal information
- Born: 7 December 1998 (age 27)

Sport
- Sport: Athletics
- Event: Sprinting
- Coached by: Fabian Franco
Medal record
Men's athletics
Representing Gibraltar
Island Games
Gold medal – first place	2019 Gibraltar	200 m
Gold medal – first place	2019 Gibraltar	400 m
Silver medal – second place	2017 Gotland	4 x 400 m relay
Bronze medal – third place	2023 Guernsey	200 m

Jessy Franco (born 7 December 1998) is a Gibraltarian sprinter. He represented his territory in the 400 metres at the 2019 World Championships in Doha without advancing from the first round but setting a new national record of 47.41.

He has a Gibraltarian father and Faroese mother who met when competing at the 1989 Island Games in athletics and gymnastics respectively. Jessy himself later competed at two editions of the Games. His older brother Julian was also a sprinter.

== International competitions ==
Year	Competition	Venue	Position	Event	Notes
Representing Gibraltar
2015	Island Games	Jersey	6th	100 m	11.22
2015	Island Games	Jersey	6th (h)	4 × 100 m relay	44.62
2015	Island Games	Jersey	5th	4 × 400 m relay	3:30.46
2015	European Junior Championships	Eskilstuna, Sweden	24th (h)	100 m	11.24
2015	Commonwealth Youth Games	Apia, Samoa	13th (sf)	200 m	22.57 (w)
2015	Commonwealth Youth Games	Apia, Samoa	9th (h)	400 m	50.62
2016	World U20 Championships	Bydgoszcz, Poland	32nd (h)	200 m	22.44
2017	Island Games	Gotland, Sweden	5th	4 x 100 m relay	44.20
2017	Island Games	Gotland, Sweden	2nd	4 × 400 m relay	3.29.47
2018	Commonwealth Games	Gold Coast, Australia	56th (h)	100 m	11.04
2018	Commonwealth Games	Gold Coast, Australia	35th (h)	400 m	48.40
2018	Championships of the Small States of Europe	Schaan, Liechtenstein	4th	400 m	49.69
2018	European Championships	Berlin, Germany	29th (h)	400 m	48.12
2019	Island Games	Gibraltar	1st	200 m	22.47
2019	Island Games	Gibraltar	1st	400 m	48.34
2019	World Championships	Doha, Qatar	35th (h)	400 m	47.41
2023	Island Games	Guernsey	3rd	200 m	
2023	Island Games	Guernsey	7th	400 m	49.37
2023	Island Games	Guernsey	4th	4 × 100 m relay	43.39
2023	World Championships	Budapest, Hungary	54th (h)	200 m	22.04

== Personal bests ==
Outdoor

- 100 metres – 10.90 (+0.4 m/s, Gibraltar 2018) NR
- 200 metres – 21.20 (+0.9 m/s, Pretoria 2016)
- 400 metres – 47.41 (Doha 2019) NR

Indoor

- 200 metres – 22.34 (Antequera 2018)
