= Craig Gill (sprinter) =

Gibraltan athlete (born 2002)

Personal information
- Nationality: Gibraltar
- Born: 27 January 2002 (age 24)

Sport
- Sport: Athletics
- Event: Sprint

Achievements and titles
- Personal best(s): 60m: 7.07 (Sheffield, 2023); 100m: 11.09 (Birmingham, 2022); 200m: 22.62 (Sheffield, 2023)

Craig Gill (born 27 January 2002) is a sprinter who competes internationally for Gibraltar.

== Career ==
In December 2021, he set a Gibraltar under-20 and under-23 national record for the 60 metres, running 7.16 seconds in Manchester. He lowered that mark again to 7.10 seconds whilst competing at the 2022 World Athletics Indoor Championships in Belgrade in 2022.

Gill ran a personal best time of 11.24 seconds in the 100m at the 2022 World Athletics Championships in Eugene to finish in fourth place in his preliminary heat. He competed at the 2022 Commonwealth Games in Birmingham where he achieved a personal best time for the 100 metres with a time of 11.09 seconds to finish in 64th place overall from the 80 sprinters competing. He also competed in the 200 metres at the Games, running 22.74 seconds without reaching the semi-final.

In January 2023, he set a new 60 metres personal best of 7.07 seconds at the Northern Athletics Championships in Sheffield. He competed at the 2023 European Athletics Indoor Championships in Istanbul. He missed the 2023 outdoor season due to injury.

Gill competed at the 2024 World Athletics Indoor Championships in Glasgow, running 7.17 seconds for the 60 metres. He was selected for the 2024 European Athletics Championships in Rome in June 2024. He ran a seasons best 11.24 seconds for the 100 metres but did not proceed from his qualifying heat.

== Personal life ==
Born and raised in Gibraltar, when he was 18 years-old he moved to Manchester, England where he earned a degree in fire engineering.
