= Gibraltar at the 2010 European Athletics Championships =

Sporting event delegation

Gibraltar was represented by 1 athlete at the 2010 European Athletics Championships held in Barcelona, Spain.

== Participants ==
Event	Men	Women
100 m	Dominic Carroll	

== Results ==
2010 Barcelona	Gold	Silver	Bronze	Total
Gibraltar (GIB)	0	0	0	0

=== Men ===
Track and road events

Event	Athletes	Heat Round 1		Heat Round 2		Semifinal		Final	
Event	Athletes	Result	Rank	Result	Rank	Result	Rank	Result	Rank
100 m	Dominic Carroll	-	DSQ						
