= Harvey Dixon =

Gibraltarian middle-distance runner

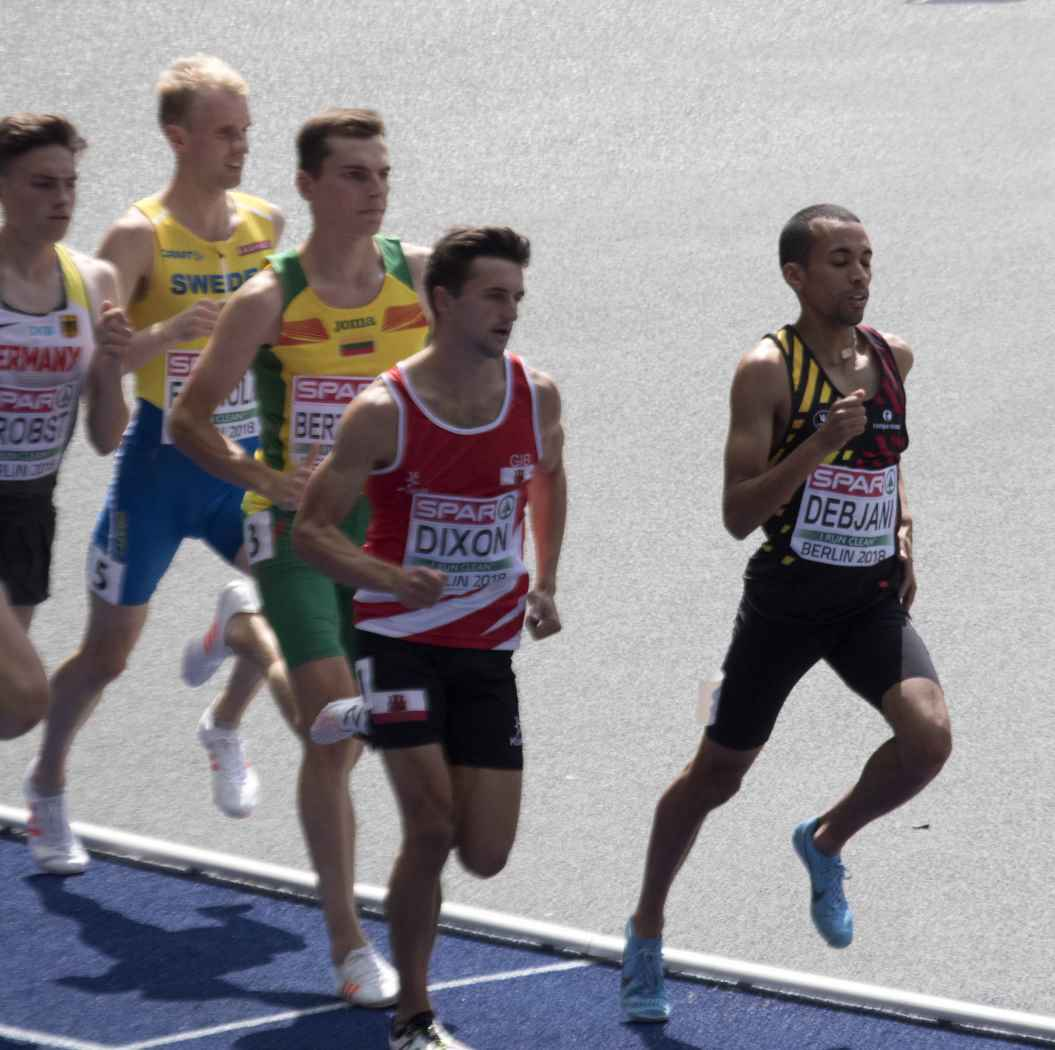
- Harvey Dixon in 2018

Personal information
- Born: 2 November 1993 (age 32) Nice, France
- Education: Providence College, Salesian College
- Height: 1.76 m (5 ft 9 in)
- Weight: 67 kg (148 lb)

Sport
- Sport: Athletics
- Event(s): 1500 metres, 5000 metres
- College team: Providence Friars
- Club: Aldershot, Farnham & District AC
- Coached by: Geoff Wightman
Medal record
Men's athletics
Representing Gibraltar
Island Games
Gold medal – first place	2015 Jersey	5000 m
Gold medal – first place	2017 Gotland	1500 m
Gold medal – first place	2017 Gotland	5000 m
Silver medal – second place	2015 Jersey	800 m
Silver medal – second place	2017 Gotland	4×400 metres relay
Silver medal – second place	2019 Gibraltar	5000 m
Bronze medal – third place	2019 Gibraltar	Half-marathon team
Bronze medal – third place	2023 Guernsey	Half-marathon team

Harvey Dixon (born 2 November 1993) is a British middle-distance runner who competes for Gibraltar primarily in the 1500 metres. He represented his country at the 2017 World Championships failing to qualify for the next round despite setting a new national record.

In April 2018, he became the first athlete from Gibraltar to reach a final at the Commonwealth Games, when he qualified for the men's 1500 metres at the Gold Coast games. He finished in eleventh place, setting a new national record in the process.

== International competitions ==
Year	Competition	Venue	Position	Event	Notes
Representing Gibraltar
2014	Commonwealth Games	Glasgow, United Kingdom	18th (h)	1500 m	3:44.67
2015	Island Games	Jersey	1st	1500 m	14:29.47
2015	Island Games	Jersey	2nd	800 m	1:54.95
2016	European Championships	Amsterdam, Netherlands	35th (h)	1500 m	3:51.82
2017	Island Games	Gotland, Sweden	1st	1500 m	3:48.71
2017	Island Games	Gotland, Sweden	1st	5000 m	14:46.47
2017	Island Games	Gotland, Sweden	2nd	4×400 metres relay	3:29.47
2017	World Championships	London, United Kingdom	23rd (h)	1500 m	3:44.03
2018	World Indoor Championships	Birmingham, United Kingdom	16th (h)	1500 m	3:49.89
2018	Commonwealth Games	Gold Coast, Australia	11th	1500 m	3:43.84
2018	Championships of the Small States of Europe	Schaan, Liechtenstein	4th	800 m	1:52.38
2018	European Championships	Berlin, Germany	32nd (h)	1500 m	3:54.70
2019	European Indoor Championships	Glasgow, United Kingdom	30th (h)	3000 m	8:14.86
2019	Island Games	Gibraltar	2nd	5000 m	15:25.56
2019	Island Games	Gibraltar	3rd	Half-marathon team	11 points

== Personal bests ==
Outdoor

- 800 metres – 1:50.58 (Watford 2014)
- 1500 metres – 3:44.03 (London 2017)
- One mile – 4:05.57 (Concord 2014)
- 3000 metres – 8:12.33 (Watford 2012)
- 5000 metres – 14:37.14 (Stretford 2013)
- 10 kilometres – 30:40 (London 2017)

Indoor

- 800 metres – 1:52.71 (Lee Valley 2017)
- 1000 metres – 2:23.70 (Boston 2015)
- 1500 metres – 3:49.89 (Birmingham 2018)
- One mile – 4:03.34 (Boston 2018)
- 3000 metres – 8:18.17 (Boston 2014)
