= Gibraltar at the 2012 European Athletics Championships =

Gibraltar competed at the 2012 European Athletics Championships held in Helsinki, Finland, between 27 June to 1 July 2012. 2 competitors, 2 men took part in 2 events.

== Results ==
=== Men ===
Track events

Event	Athletes	Heat		Semifinal		Final	
Event	Athletes	Result	Rank	Result	Rank	Result	Rank
200 m	Jerai Torres	22.31	29	did not advance			
400 m	Jonathan Lavers	50.23	30	did not advance			
