= Flag of Gibraltar =

British overseas territory flag

Gibraltar
- Flag of Gibraltar
- Use: Civil and state flag
- Proportion: 1:2
- Adopted: 8 November 1982
- Design: A white field with a red stripe at the bottom with a three-towered, two-tiered red castle in the white section. Each tower has a door and a window and from the door of the middle tower hangs a gold key which mainly overlaps the red stripe.
- Union Flag
- Use: Other
- Proportion: 1:2
- Design: Flag of the United Kingdom
- State ensign of Gibraltar
- Use: State ensign
- Proportion: 1:2
- Adopted: 1999 (1939)
- Design: Blue Ensign with the Union Flag in the canton and the badge of Gibraltar in the fly.
- Civil ensign of Gibraltar
- Use: Civil ensign
- Proportion: 1:2
- Adopted: 1996
- Design: Red Ensign with the Union Flag in the canton and the badge of Gibraltar in the fly.
- Flag of the governor of Gibraltar
- Use: Other
- Proportion: 1:2
- Adopted: 1999 (1982)
- Design: A Union Flag defaced with the coat of arms.

The flag of Gibraltar is an elongated banner of arms based on the coat of arms of Gibraltar, granted by Royal Warrant from Queen Isabella I of Castile on 10 July 1502. Gibraltar is unique as it is the only British Overseas Territory whose flag does not feature the Union Jack in any form, although the latter is widely flown as a standalone flag within the colony.

== Description ==
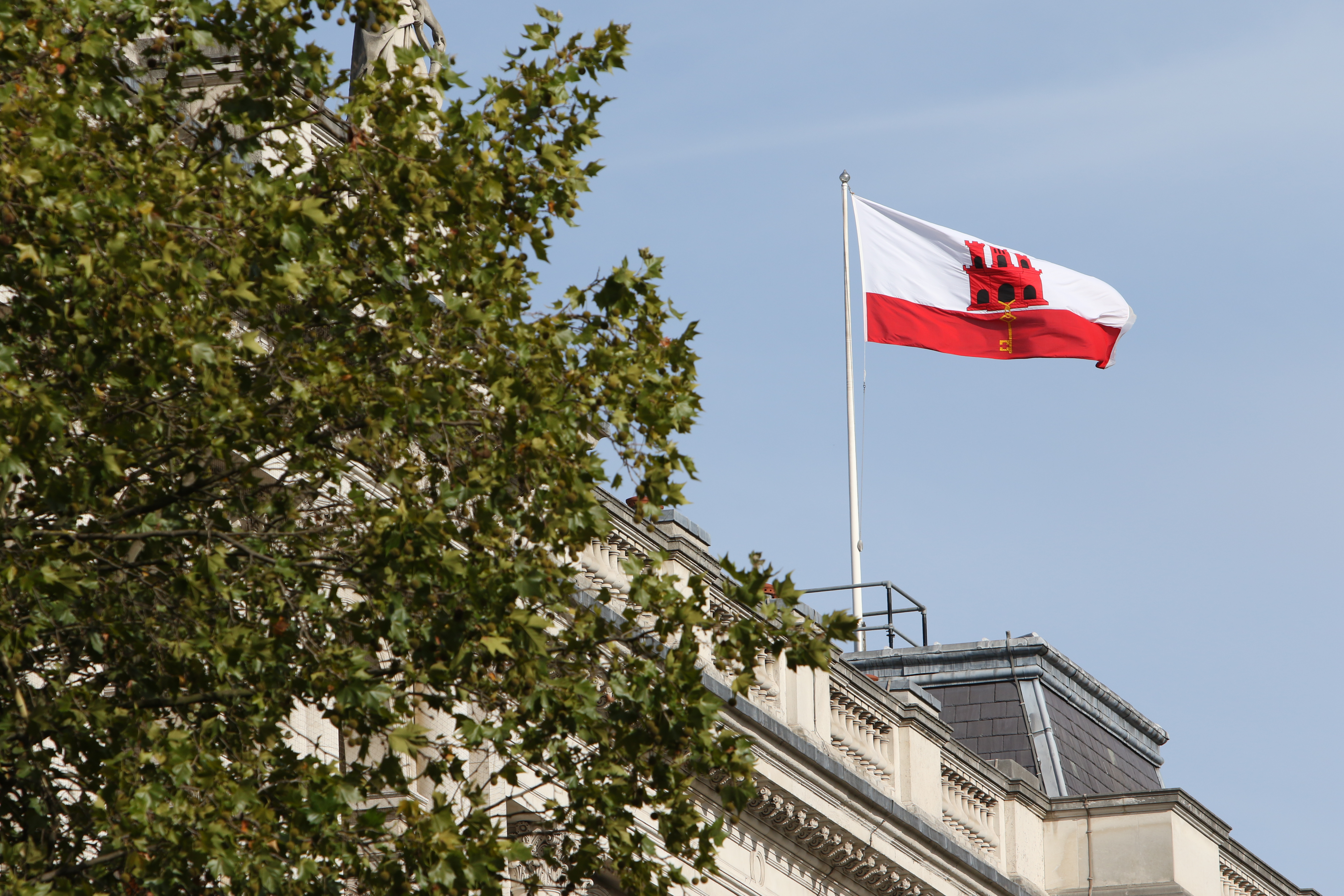
Flag of Gibraltar atop a building

"An escutcheon on which the upper two thirds shall be a white field and on the said field set a red castle, and below the said castle, on the other third of the escutcheon, which must be a red field in which there must be a white line between the castle and the said red field, there shall be a golden key which hangs by a chain from the said castle, as are here figured".

The flag was regularised in 1982 and is formed by two horizontal bands of white (top, double width) and red with a three-towered red castle in the centre of the white band; hanging from the castle gate is a gold key centred in the red band. The flag differs from that of other British overseas territories, in that it is not a British ensign nor does it feature the Union Jack in any form. The castle does not resemble any in Gibraltar but is supposed to represent the fortress of Gibraltar. The key is said to symbolise the fortress' significance as Gibraltar was seen to be the key to Spain by the Moors and Spanish and later as the key to the Mediterranean by the British.

== Use ==
The flag is flown throughout Gibraltar, sometimes officially alongside the Union Flag and the Commonwealth Flag. Prominent places which fly the flag include the frontier with Spain, at the top of The Rock and on the Parliament Building.

The flag is a symbol of Gibraltarian nationalism and is very popular among Gibraltarians. For the Gibraltar National Day (10 September), many Gibraltar homes and offices hang the flag from their windows and balconies, and some individuals even wear and dress their vehicles with the flag for national day celebrations. This was also seen during the 2004 celebrations of the tercentenary of British Gibraltar.

Gibraltarian students attending university abroad have been known to take Gibraltarian flags with them, putting them up in university accommodation rooms and hanging them from windows.

A Lego flag of Gibraltar 4 metres (13 ft) high and 8 metres (26 ft) long can be seen at the John Mackintosh Hall, which is a cultural centre housing the public library as well as exhibition rooms and a theatre. At the time of its construction, the Lego flag of Gibraltar was the largest flag ever to be made from Lego bricks with a total of 393,857 bricks being used.

== Historical flags ==
=== Government Ensigns ===
Government Ensign (1875–1921)

Government Ensign (1921–1939)

Government Ensign (1939–1999)

=== Governor's flags ===
Governor of Gibraltar (1875–1939)

Governor of Gibraltar (1939–1982)

Governor of Gibraltar (1982–1999)

== Other flags ==
Royal Gibraltar Yacht Club

Diocese of Gibraltar in Europe

== See also ==
- List of United Kingdom flags
- List of coats of arms of the United Kingdom and dependencies
