= Gibraltar Athletics =

Governing body for athletics in Gibraltar

Gibraltar Amateur Athletic Association
- Sport: Athletics
- Affiliation: World Athletics
- Regional affiliation: EAA and AASSE
- Headquarters: Gibraltar
- President: Frank Carreras

Official website
- gibraltarathletics.com
- (Gibraltar)

Gibraltar Athletics, also known as the Gibraltar Amateur Athletic Association, is the governing body for the sport of athletics in Gibraltar.

They have represented Gibraltar at several World Athletics global championships. They hosted the athletics competitions at the 2019 Island Games. They are planned to also host the Championships of the Small States of Europe in June 2024.

== Affiliations ==
- World Athletics
- European Athletic Association (EAA)
- British Olympic Association

== National records ==
The Gibraltar Amateur Athletic Association maintains the Gibraltar records in athletics.
