= Basketball at the 2007 Island Games =

Basketball was one of the 14 sports held at the 2007 Island Games.

Menorca won in both men's and women's competition.

== Men's basketball ==
=== Group A ===
Team	Pld	W	L	F	A	D	Pts
Menorca	5	5	0	427	283	+144	10
Bermuda	5	4	1	454	326	+128	9
Cayman Islands	5	3	2	427	370	+57	8
Gibraltar	5	2	3	392	363	+29	7
Guernsey	5	1	4	257	427	-170	6
Jersey	5	0	5	277	465	-188	5

=== Group B ===
Team	Pld	W	L	F	A	D	Pts
(Greece) Rhodes	4	4	0	401	230	+171	8
Saaremaa	4	3	1	343	277	+66	7
Gotland	4	2	3	330	270	+60	6
(Wales) Ynys Môn/Anglesey	4	1	3	270	347	-77	5
Isle of Man	4	0	4	172	392	-220	4

=== Medal Matches ===
Semi-finals
5 July – Ialyssos Indoor Hall
Menorca	73
Saaremaa	64
5 July - Venetoklio Indoor Hall
Bermuda	88
(Greece) Rhodes	80

Final
6 July – Venetoklio Indoor Hall
Menorca	75
Bermuda	72
Third place
6 July – Venetoklio Indoor Hall
Saaremaa	58
(Greece) Rhodes	73

2007 Island Games Winners
Menorca
First Title

== Women's basketball ==
=== Medal Matches ===
Semi-finals
5 July – Venetoklio Indoor Hall
Bermuda	47
Prince Edward Island	69
5 July - Ialyssos Indoor Hall
Guernsey	53
Menorca	76

Final
6 July – Ialyssos Indoor Hall
Prince Edward Island	58
Menorca	62
Third place
6 July – Ialyssos Indoor Hall
Bermuda	59
Guernsey	53

2007 Island Games Winners
Menorca
First Title

== Sources ==
- IslandGames.net: 2007 basketball results
